= 2015 European Shooting Championships =

- Dates: 19–31 July
- Host city: Maribor, Slovenia
- Level: Senior
- Events: 14 men + 7 women (individual); 14 men + 7 women (team)

The 2015 European Shooting Championships was held in Maribor, Slovenia from July 19 to 31, 2015.

== Men's events ==
=== 300 m rifle ===
Event	Gold	Silver	Bronze
Rifle 3 positions 300 m	Péter Sidi (HUN)	Gernot Rumpler (AUT)	Rajmond Debevec (SLO)
Rifle 3 positions 300 m teams	France; Josselin Henry; Cyril Graff; Valérian Sauveplane	Norway; Ole-Kristian Bryhn; Simon Claussen; Odd Arne Brekne	Switzerland; Claude-Alain Delley; Olivier Schaffter; Rafael Bereuter
Rifle prone 300 m	Valérian Sauveplane (FRA)	Rajmond Debevec (SLO)	Stefan Raser (AUT)
Rifle prone 300 m teams	Austria; Stefan Raser; Gernot Rumpler; Klaus Gstinig	France; Remi Moreno Flores; Valérian Sauveplane; Cyril Graff	Sweden; Per Sandberg; Johan Gustafsson; Stefan Ahlesved
Rifle standard 300 m	Valérian Sauveplane (FRA)	Josselin Henry (FRA)	Péter Sidi (HUN)
Rifle standard 300 m teams	France; Valérian Sauveplane; Josselin Henry; Cyril Graff	Norway; Ole-Kristian Bryhn; Odd Arne Brekne; Stian Bogar	Austria; Gernot Rumpler; Bernhard Pickl; Michael Podolak

=== Rifle ===
Event	Gold	Silver	Bronze
Rifle 3 positions 50 m	Sergey Kamenskiy (RUS)	Alexis Raynaud (FRA)	Daniel Brodmeier (GER)
Rifle 3 positions 50 m teams	Russia; Sergey Kamenskiy; Nazar Louginets; Fedor Vlasov	Germany; Daniel Brodmeier; Nicolas Schallenberger; Michael Janker	France; Alexis Raynaud; Cyril Graff; Valérian Sauveplane
Rifle prone 50 m	Sergei Kovalenko (RUS)	Sergey Kamenskiy (RUS)	Vitali Bubnovich (BLR)
Rifle prone 50 m teams	Russia; Fedor Vlasov; Sergey Kamenskiy; Sergei Kovalenko	Austria; Alexander Schmirl; Thomas Mathis; Stefan Raser	Norway; Ole-Kristian Bryhn; Stian Bogar; Odd Arne Brekne

=== Pistol ===
Event	Gold	Silver	Bronze
Pistol 50 m	João Costa (POR)	Francesco Bruno (ITA)	Sergey Chervyakovskiy (RUS)
Pistol 50 m teams	Russia; Sergey Chervyakovskiy; Denis Kulakov; Vladimir Gontcharov	Belarus; Yauheni Zaichyk; Kanstantsin Lukashyk; Andrei Kazak	Italy; Giuseppe Giordano; Francesco Bruno; Andrea Amore
Rapid fire pistol 25 m	Oliver Geis (GER)	Alexei Klimov (RUS)	Jorge Llames (ESP)
Rapid fire pistol 25 m teams	Germany; Christian Reitz; Oliver Geis; Philipp Wagenitz	Ukraine; Roman Bondaruk; Volodymyr Pasternak; Denys Kushnirov	France; Clément Bessaguet; Boris Artaud; Fabrice Daumal
Center fire pistol 25 m	Christian Reitz (GER)	Pål Hembre (NOR)	Leonid Yekimov (RUS)
Center fire pistol 25 m teams	Germany; Christian Reitz; Pierre Michel; Patrick Meyer	Turkey; Yusuf Dikeç; Fatih Kavruk; Murat Kılıç	Russia; Leonid Yekimov; Alexei Klimov; Vyacheslav Kalyuzhny
Standard pistol 25 m	Alexei Klimov (RUS)	Christian Reitz (GER)	Roman Bondaruk (UKR)
Standard pistol 25 m teams	Germany; Christian Reitz; Pierre Michel; Patrick Meyer	France; Clément Bessaguet; Fabrice Daumal; Boris Artaud	Russia; Alexei Klimov; Leonid Yekimov; Vyacheslav Kalyuzhny

=== Running target ===
Event	Gold	Silver	Bronze
Running target 50 m	Dmitry Romanov (RUS)	Mikhail Azarenko (RUS)	Maxim Stepanov (RUS)
Running target 50 m teams	Russia; Dmitry Romanov; Mikhail Azarenko; Maxim Stepanov	Sweden; Emil Martinsson; Niklas Bergström; Jesper Nyberg	Hungary; József Sike; Tamás Tasi; László Boros
Running target mixed 50 m	Maxim Stepanov (RUS)	Emil Martinsson (SWE)	Łukasz Czapla (POL)
Running target mixed 50 m teams	Russia; Maxim Stepanov; Mikhail Azarenko; Dmitry Romanov	Finland; Tomi-Pekka Heikkilä; Krister Holmberg; Heikki Lahdekorpi	Hungary; József Sike; Tamás Tasi; László Boros

=== Shotgun ===
Event	Gold	Silver	Bronze
Trap	Giovanni Pellielo (ITA)	Alberto Fernández (ESP)	Boštjan Maček (SLO)
Trap teams	Slovakia; Marián Kovačócy; Roman Čavara; Erik Varga	Turkey; Alp Kızılsu; Yavuz İlnam; Oğuzhan Tüzün	Spain; Alberto Fernández; Jesús Serrano; Joan García
Double trap	Daniele Di Spigno (ITA)	Håkan Dahlby (SWE)	Andreas Löw (GER)
Double trap teams	Great Britain; Tim Kneale; Steven Scott; Matthew Coward-Holley	Italy; Daniele Di Spigno; Marco Innocenti; Antonino Barillà	Russia; Vitaly Fokeev; Artem Nekrasov; Vasily Mosin
Skeet	Luigi Lodde (ITA)	Efthimios Mitas (GRE)	Jesper Hansen (DEN)
Skeet teams	Russia; Anton Astakhov; Aleksey Skorobogatov; Valeriy Shomin	Norway; Tom Beier Jensen; Tore Brovold; Ole Eilif Undseth	Italy; Luigi Lodde; Valerio Luchini; Riccardo Filippelli

== Women's events ==
=== 300 m rifle ===
Event	Gold	Silver	Bronze
Rifle 3 positions 300 m	Lisa Müller (GER)	Hannah Pugsley (GBR)	Lessia Leskiv (UKR)
Rifle 3 positions 300 m teams	Germany; Lisa Müller; Inken Plengemeyer; Sandra Georg	Switzerland; Andrea Brühlmann; Marina Schnider; Bettina Bucher	Estonia; Anzela Voronova; Valeria Škabara; Liudmila Kortshagina
Rifle prone 300 m	Lisa Müller (GER)	Hannah Pugsley (GBR)	Bettina Bucher (SUI)
Rifle prone 300 m teams	Switzerland; Bettina Bucher; Myriam Brühwiler; Marina Schnider	Germany; Lisa Müller; Sandra Georg; Inken Plengemeyer	Estonia; Valeria Škabara; Anzela Voronova; Liudmila Kortshagina

=== Rifle ===
Event	Gold	Silver	Bronze
Rifle 3 positions 50 m	Ivana Maksimović (SRB)	Petra Zublasing (ITA)	Barbara Engleder (GER)
Rifle 3 positions 50 m teams	Poland; Agnieszka Nagay; Karolina Kowalczyk; Sylwia Bogacka	Germany; Barbara Engleder; Jolyn Beer; Selina Gschwandtner	Czech Republic; Lucie Švecová; Adéla Sýkorová; Nikola Mazurová
Rifle prone 50 m	Adéla Sýkorová (CZE)	Snježana Pejčić (CRO)	Yulia Karimova (RUS)
Rifle prone 50 m teams	Germany; Barbara Engleder; Beate Gauß; Jolyn Beer	Czech Republic; Adéla Sýkorová; Nikola Mazurová; Lucie Švecová	Russia; Yulia Karimova; Alena Nizkoshapskaia; Maria Feklistova

=== Pistol ===
Event	Gold	Silver	Bronze
Pistol 25 m	Zsófia Csonka (HUN)	Viktoriya Chaika (BLR)	Olena Kostevych (UKR)
Pistol 25 m teams	Ukraine; Olena Kostevych; Kateryna Zelenska; Oksana Kaminska	Russia; Yuliya Alipova; Svetlana Medvedeva; Anna Mastyanina	Bulgaria; Antoaneta Boneva; Maria Grozdeva; Monika Kostova

=== Shotgun ===
Event	Gold	Silver	Bronze
Trap	Zuzana Štefečeková (SVK)	Ekaterina Rabaya (RUS)	Jessica Rossi (ITA)
Trap teams	Italy; Jessica Rossi; Federica Caporuscio; Deborah Gelisio	Slovakia; Jana Mezeiová; Zuzana Rehák-Štefečeková; Lucia Boorová	France; Delphine Réau; Carole Cormenier; Mélanie Couzy
Skeet	Christine Wenzel (GER)	Danka Barteková (SVK)	Andri Eleftheriou (CYP)
Skeet teams	Slovakia; Veronika Sýkorová; Danka Barteková; Andrea Stranovská	Cyprus; Andri Eleftheriou; Panayiota Andreou; Konstantia Nikolaou	Great Britain; Elena Allen; Amber Hill; Sian Bruce

== Medal table ==
Rank	Nation	Gold	Silver	Bronze	Total
1	Russia (RUS)	11	5	8	24
2	Germany (GER)	10	4	3	17
3	France (FRA)	4	4	3	11
4	Italy (ITA)	4	3	3	10
5	Slovakia (SVK)	3	2	0	5
6	Hungary (HUN)	2	0	3	5
7	Austria (AUT)	1	2	2	5
8	Great Britain (GBR)	1	2	1	4
9	Ukraine (UKR)	1	1	3	5
10	Switzerland (SUI)	1	1	2	4
11	Czech Republic (CZE)	1	1	1	3
12	Poland (POL)	1	0	1	2
13	Portugal (POR)	1	0	0	1
13	Serbia (SRB)	1	0	0	1
15	Norway (NOR)	0	4	1	5
16	Sweden (SWE)	0	3	1	4
17	Belarus (BLR)	0	2	1	3
18	Turkey (TUR)	0	2	0	2
19	Slovenia (SLO)	0	1	2	3
19	Spain (ESP)	0	1	2	3
21	Cyprus (CYP)	0	1	1	2
22	Croatia (CRO)	0	1	0	1
22	Finland (FIN)	0	1	0	1
22	Greece (GRE)	0	1	0	1
25	Estonia (EST)	0	0	2	2
26	Bulgaria (BUL)	0	0	1	1
26	Denmark (DEN)	0	0	1	1
Totals (27 entries)		42	42	42	126
