= 2009 European Shooting Championships =

Shooting event in Australia

- Host city: Osijek, Croatia
- Dates: July 12–26

The 2009 European Shooting Championships were the 27th European Shooting Championships and took place from 12 to 26 of July in Osijek, Croatia.

== Medal summary ==
=== Men ===
Event	Gold	Silver	Bronze
50 m rifle 3 positions	Péter Sidi; Hungary	Thomas Farnik; Austria	Julian Justus; Germany
50 m rifle 3 positions team	Slovenia; Rajmond Debevec; Željko Moičević; Robert Markoja	Austria; Thomas Farnik; Mario Knögler; Christian Planer	Serbia; Nemanja Mirosavljev; Stevan Pletikosić; Dragan Marković
50 m rifle prone	Christian Planer; Austria	Mario Knögler; Austria	Valérian Sauveplane; France
50 m rifle prone team	Serbia; Stevan Pletikosić; Milenko Sebić; Nemanja Mirosavljev	Denmark; Torben Grimmel; Kenneth Nielsen; Carsten Brandt	France; Valérian Sauveplane; Josselin Henry; Guillaume Bigot
300 m rifle 3 positions	Péter Sidi; Hungary	Marcel Bürge; Switzerland	Josselin Henry; France
300 m rifle 3 positions team	Switzerland; Marcel Bürge; Simon Beyeler; Marco Mueller	Norway; Ole-Kristian Bryhn; Vebjørn Berg; Thore Larsen	France; Josselin Henry; Valérian Sauveplane; Cyril Graff
300 m rifle prone	Richard Dietzsch; Germany	Odd Arne Brekne; Norway	Stefan Ahlesved; Sweden
300 m rifle prone team	Czech Republic; Tomáš Jeřábek; Luboš Opelka; Milan Mach	France; Josselin Henry; Valérian Sauveplane; Guillaume Bigot	Sweden; Stefan Ahlesved; Michael Larsson; Johan Gustafsson
300 m standard rifle	Vebjørn Berg; Norway	Robert Markoja; Slovenia	Rajmond Debevec; Slovenia
300 m standard rifle team	France; Josselin Henry; Valérian Sauveplane; Cyril Graff	Norway; Vebjørn Berg; Hans Bakken; Thore Larsen	Austria; Mario Knögler; Florian Kammerlander; Thomas Farnik
25 m rapid fire pistol	Jorge Llames; Spain	Mikhail Nestruyev; Russia	Riccardo Mazzetti; Italy
25 m rapid fire pistol team	Czech Republic; Martin Strnad; Martin Podhráský; Josef Fiala	Russia; Mikhail Nestruyev; Alexei Klimov; Dmitry Brayko	Ukraine; Oleksandr Petriv; Taras Magmet; Roman Bondaruk
25 m center fire pistol	Alexei Klimov; Russia	Franck Dumoulin; France	João Costa; Portugal
25 m center fire pistol team	Russia; Alexei Klimov; Mikhail Nestruyev; Alexander Parinov	Turkey; Yavuz Deveci; Yusuf Dikeç; Fatih Kavruk	France; Franck Dumoulin; Sébastien Blanchouin; Thierry Riedinger
25 m standard pistol	Denis Koulakov; Russia	Leonid Yekimov; Russia	Thibaut Sauvage; France
25 m standard pistol team	Russia; Denis Koulakov; Leonid Yekimov; Mikhail Nestruyev	France; Thibaut Sauvage; Franck Dumoulin; Fabrice Daumal	Ukraine; Oleksandr Petriv; Roman Bondaruk; Taras Magmet
50 m pistol	João Costa; Portugal	Hans-Jörg Meyer; Germany	Norayr Bakhtamyan; Armenia
50 m pistol team	Russia; Vladimir Isakov; Leonid Yekimov; Denis Koulakov	Italy; Francesco Bruno; Roberto Di Donna; Giuseppe Giordano	Portugal; João Costa; António Manuel Santos; José Marracho
Trap	Giovanni Pellielo; Italy	Andreas Scherhaufer; Austria	Mário Filipovič; Slovakia
Trap team	Italy; Giovanni Pellielo; Massimo Fabbrizi; Erminio Frasca	Croatia; Anton Glasnović; Giovanni Cernogoraz; Josip Glasnović	Slovenia; Boštjan Maček; Matej Žniderčič; Denis Vatovec
Double Trap	Francesco D'Aniello; Italy	Håkan Dahlby; Sweden	Roland Gerebics; Hungary
Double Trap team	Italy; Francesco D'Aniello; Daniele Di Spigno; Claudio Franzoni	Russia; Vasily Mosin; Vitaly Fokeev; Mikhail Leybo	Germany; Andreas Löw; Waldemar Schanz; Michael Goldbrunner
Skeet	Tore Brovold; Norway	Ennio Falco; Italy	Jan Sychra; Czech Republic
Skeet team	Czech Republic; Jan Sychra; Leoš Hlaváček; Aleš Hutar	Norway; Tore Brovold; Harald Jensen; Jonas Filtvedt	Italy; Ennio Falco; Valerio Luchini; Cristian Eleuteri
50 m running target	Miroslav Januš; Czech Republic	Niklas Bergström; Sweden	Dimitry Romanov; Russia
50 m running target team	Russia; Dimitry Romanov; Maxim Stepanov; Igor Kolesov	Sweden; Niklas Bergström; Emil Andersson; Mattias Bergman	Czech Republic; Miroslav Januš; Bedřich Jonáš; Josef Nikl
50 m running target mixed	Vladislav Prianishnikov; Ukraine	Krister Holmberg; Finland	Tamás Tasi; Hungary
50 m running target mixed team	Czech Republic; Josef Nikl; Bedřich Jonáš; Miroslav Januš	Ukraine; Vladislav Prianishnikov; Oleksandr Zinenko; Igor Matskevych	Russia; Maxim Stepanov; Igor Kolesov; Dimitry Romanov

=== Women ===
Event	Gold	Silver	Bronze
50 m rifle 3 positions	Tatiana Goldobina; Russia	Barbara Lechner; Germany	Sonja Pfeilschifter; Germany
50 m rifle 3 positions team	Germany; Barbara Lechner; Sonja Pfeilschifter; Amelie Kleinmanns	Russia; Tatiana Goldobina; Maria Feklistova; Lyubov Galkina	Ukraine; Natallia Kalnysh; Daria Shytko; Lessia Leskiv
50 m rifle prone	Marie Enqvist; Sweden	Hanna Etula; Finland	Viktoria Ivancheva; Bulgaria
50 m rifle prone team	Great Britain; Johanne Brekke; Michelle Smith; Sharon Lee	Finland; Hanna Etula; Tiia Törmälä; Marjo Yli-Kiikka	Germany; Sonja Pfeilschifter; Claudia Keck; Barbara Lechner
300 m rifle 3 positions	Charlotte Jakobsen; Denmark	May Elisabeth Nordahl; Norway	Berit Olsson; Sweden
300 m rifle prone	Charlotte Jakobsen; Denmark	Marie Enqvist; Sweden	Harriet Holzberger; Germany
300 m rifle prone team	Switzerland; Bettina Bucher; Annik Marguet; Sybille Strässle	Germany; Harriet Holzberger; Sandra Georg; Gudrun Wittmann	France; Solveig Bibard; Catherine Houlmont; Christine Chuard
25 m pistol	Maria Grozdeva; Bulgaria	Lenka Marušková; Czech Republic	Sławomira Szpek; Poland
25 m pistol team	Belarus; Katsiaryna Kruchanok; Zhanna Shapialevich; Viktoria Chaika	Germany; Monika Martin; Munkhbayar Dorjsuren; Antje Noeske	France; Corinne Serra Tosio; Céline Goberville; Laura Riedinger
Trap	Jessica Rossi; Italy	Daina Gudzinevičiūtė; Lithuania	Stéphanie Neau; France
Trap team	Italy; Deborah Gelisio; Giulia Iannotti; Jessica Rossi	San Marino; Alessandra Perilli; Daniela Del Din; Francesca Spadoni	Germany; Susanne Kiermayer; Christiane Göhring; Jana Beckmann
Skeet	Nathalie Larsson; Sweden	Katiuscia Spada; Italy	Christine Brinker; Germany
Skeet team	Russia; Nadezda Konovalova; Olga Panarina; Svetlana Demina	Italy; Katiuscia Spada; Chiara Cainero; Cristina Vitali	Cyprus; Bianca Lupan Kassianidou; Andri Eleftheriou; Louiza Theophanous

== Medal table ==
Rank	Nation	Gold	Silver	Bronze	Total
1	Russia	8	5	2	15
2	Italy	6	4	2	12
3	Czech Republic	5	1	2	8
4	Norway	2	5	0	7
5	Germany	2	4	7	13
6	Sweden	2	4	3	9
7	Denmark	2	1	0	3
7	Switzerland	2	1	0	3
9	Hungary	2	0	2	4
10	Austria	1	4	1	6
11	France	1	3	9	13
12	Ukraine	1	1	3	5
13	Slovenia	1	1	2	4
14	Portugal	1	0	2	3
15	Bulgaria	1	0	1	2
15	Serbia	1	0	1	2
17	Belarus	1	0	0	1
17	Great Britain	1	0	0	1
17	Spain	1	0	0	1
20	Finland	0	3	0	3
21	Croatia	0	1	0	1
21	Lithuania	0	1	0	1
21	San Marino	0	1	0	1
21	Turkey	0	1	0	1
25	Armenia	0	0	1	1
25	Cyprus	0	0	1	1
25	Poland	0	0	1	1
25	Slovakia	0	0	1	1
Totals (28 entries)		41	41	41	123
