= 2014 ISSF World Shooting Championships =

Sports shooting event in Granada, Spain

- Location: Granada, Spain
- Dates: 6–20 September

The 51st ISSF World Shooting Championships was held in Granada, Spain from September 6 to September 20, 2014.

== Medal table (senior and junior) ==
- 53 gold medals in individual events + 49 gold medals in team events

* Host nation (Spain)

Rank	Nation	Gold	Silver	Bronze	Total
1	China (CHN)	19	16	9	44
2	Germany (GER)	15	6	4	25
3	Russia (RUS)	9	13	18	40
4	Italy (ITA)	9	8	1	18
5	France (FRA)	7	8	6	21
6	United States (USA)	6	5	6	17
7	Finland (FIN)	6	4	1	11
8	South Korea (KOR)	4	5	5	14
9	Norway (NOR)	4	2	3	9
10	Poland (POL)	4	0	1	5
11	Sweden (SWE)	3	6	1	10
12	Switzerland (SUI)	2	6	3	11
13	Ukraine (UKR)	2	3	4	9
14	Turkey (TUR)	2	1	2	5
15	Hungary (HUN)	2	0	5	7
16	Great Britain (GBR)	1	3	3	7
17	Australia (AUS)	1	1	1	3
17	Slovakia (SVK)	1	1	1	3
19	Mongolia (MGL)	1	1	0	2
20	Serbia (SRB)	1	0	2	3
21	Latvia (LAT)	1	0	1	2
22	Denmark (DEN)	1	0	0	1
22	Ireland (IRL)	1	0	0	1
24	Czech Republic (CZE)	0	2	5	7
25	Armenia (ARM)	0	2	3	5
26	Belarus (BLR)	0	1	4	5
27	India (IND)	0	1	1	2
27	Spain (ESP)*	0	1	1	2
29	Croatia (CRO)	0	1	0	1
29	Cyprus (CYP)	0	1	0	1
29	Iran (IRI)	0	1	0	1
29	Kuwait (KUW)	0	1	0	1
29	Portugal (POR)	0	1	0	1
29	Qatar (QAT)	0	1	0	1
35	Estonia (EST)	0	0	2	2
35	North Korea (PRK)	0	0	2	2
37	Austria (AUT)	0	0	1	1
37	Brazil (BRA)	0	0	1	1
37	Bulgaria (BUL)	0	0	1	1
37	Chinese Taipei (TPE)	0	0	1	1
37	Egypt (EGY)	0	0	1	1
37	Greece (GRE)	0	0	1	1
37	South Africa (RSA)	0	0	1	1
Totals (43 entries)		102	102	102	306

== Senior ==
=== Men's individual ===
Event	Gold	Silver	Bronze
10 m air pistol	Jin Jong-oh; South Korea	Yusuf Dikeç; Turkey	Vladimir Gontcharov; Russia
25 m center fire pistol	Yusuf Dikeç; Turkey	Oleksandr Petriv; Ukraine	Tomáš Těhan; Czech Republic
25 m rapid fire pistol	Kim Jun-hong; South Korea	Oliver Geis; Germany	Li Yuehong; China
25 m standard pistol	Yusuf Dikeç; Turkey	João Costa; Portugal	Christian Reitz; Germany
10 m air rifle	Yang Haoran; China	Nazar Louginets; Russia	Vitali Bubnovich; Belarus
50 m pistol	Jin Jong-oh; South Korea	Jitu Rai; India	Pang Wei; China
50 m rifle prone	Warren Potent; Australia	Daniel Brodmeier; Germany	Yury Shcherbatsevich; Belarus
50 m rifle 3 positions	Zhu Qinan; China	Sergey Kamenskiy; Russia	Vitali Bubnovich; Belarus
10 m running target	Emil Martinsson; Sweden	Zhai Yujia; China	Dmitry Romanov; Russia
10 m running target mixed	Zhai Yujia; China	Emil Martinsson; Sweden	Dmitry Romanov; Russia
Skeet	Alexander Zemlin; Russia	Anthony Terras; France	Azmy Mehelba; Egypt
Trap	Erik Varga; Slovakia	Edward Ling; Great Britain	Giovanni Pellielo; Italy
Double trap	Joshua Richmond; United States	Antonino Barillà; Italy	Steven Scott; Great Britain

=== Men's team ===
Event	Gold	Silver	Bronze
10 m air pistol	China; Pang Wei; Pu Qifeng; Wang Zhiwei	South Korea; Jin Jong-oh; Kim Cheong-Yong; Lee Dae-myung	Russia; Vladimir Gontcharov; Vladimir Isakov; Sergey Chervyakovskiy
25 m center fire pistol	Ukraine; Oleksandr Petriv; Roman Bondaruk; Pavlo Korostylov	Russia; Leonid Ekimov; Alexei Klimov; Anton Gourianov	Brazil; Emerson Duarte; Júlio Almeida; José Carlos Batista
25 m rapid fire pistol	Germany; Christian Reitz; Oliver Geis; Aaron Sauter	Czech Republic; Martin Strnad; Martin Podhráský; Tomas Tehan	Russia; Alexander Alifirenko; Alexei Klimov; Leonid Ekimov
25 m standard pistol	Ukraine; Pavlo Korostylov; Roman Bondaruk; Oleksandr Petriv	China; Jin Yongde; Li Chuanlin; Ding Feng	Turkey; Yusuf Dikeç; Fatih Kavruk; Murat Kilinc
50 m pistol	China; Wang Zhiwei; Pang Wei; Pu Qifeng	South Korea; Lee Dae-myung; Jin Jong-oh; Choi Young-rae	North Korea; Kim Jong-su; Kim Song-Guk; Kwon Tong-hyok
10 m air rifle	China; Haoran Yang; Liu Tianyou; Cao Yifei	Russia; Sergei Kruglov; Nazar Louginets; Denis Sokolov	Belarus; Vitali Bubnovich; Illia Charheika; Yury Shcherbatsevich
50 m rifle prone	China; Lan Xing; Shengbo Zhao; Liu Gang	Belarus; Sergei Martynov; Yury Shcherbatsevich; Vitali Bubnovich	Serbia; Stevan Pletikosić; Milenko Sebić; Nemanja Mirosavljev
50 m rifle 3 positions	China; Cao Yifei; Zhu Qinan; Kang Hongwei	Norway; Ole Magnus Bakken; Are Hansen; Ole-Kristian Bryhn	Russia; Nazar Louginets; Sergey Kamenskiy; Fedor Vlasov
10 m running target	Russia; Dmitry Romanov; Maxim Stepanov; Alexander Ivanov	China; Yujia Zhai; Durun Xie; Zhang Jie	Hungary; László Boros; József Sike; Tamás Tasi
10 m running target mixed	Russia; Dmitry Romanov; Maxim Stepanov; Alexander Ivanov	China; Yujia Zhai; Zhang Jie; Durun Xie	Hungary; László Boros; József Sike; Tamás Tasi
Skeet	Italy; Luigi Lodde; Riccardo Filippelli; Tammaro Cassandro	United States; Vincent Hancock; Frank Thompson; Dustin David Perry	France; Anthony Terras; Éric Delaunay; Emmanuel Petit
Trap	Italy; Giovanni Pellielo; Valerio Grazini; Massimo Fabbrizi	Kuwait; Fehaid Al-Deehani; Talal Al-Rashidi; Abdulrahman Al Faihan	Czech Republic; Jiří Lipták; David Kostelecký; Robin Danek
Double trap	Italy; Antonino Barillà; Daniele Di Spigno; Davide Gasparini	United States; Joshua Richmond; Jeffrey Holguin; Walton Eller	China; Hu Binyuan; Junjie Mo; Li Jun

=== Women's individual ===
Event	Gold	Silver	Bronze
10 m air pistol	Jung Jeehae; South Korea	Olena Kostevych; Ukraine	Wu Chia-ying; Chinese Taipei
25 meter center-fire pistol	Jingjing Zhang; China	Kim Jang-mi; South Korea	Renáta Tobai-Sike; Hungary
10 m air rifle	Petra Zublasing; Italy	Yi Siling; China	Sonja Pfeilschifter; Germany
50 m rifle prone	Beate Gauß; Germany	Chen Dongqi; China	Esmari van Reenen; South Africa
50 m rifle 3 positions	Beate Gauß; Germany	Snježana Pejčić; Croatia	Malin Westerheim; Norway
10 m running target	Julia Eydenzon; Russia	Viktoriya Rybovalova; Ukraine	Olga Stepanova; Russia
10 m running target mixed	Li Su; China	Yang Zeng; China	Galina Avramenko; Ukraine
Skeet	Brandy Drozd; United States	Elena Allen; United Kingdom	Danka Barteková; Slovakia
Trap	Katrin Quooss; Germany	Fátima Gálvez; Spain	Catherine Skinner; Australia

=== Women's team ===
Event	Gold	Silver	Bronze
10 m air pistol	Serbia; Jasna Šekarić; Bobana Veličković; Zorana Arunović	China; Guo Wenjun; Zhang Mengyuan; Zhou Qingyuan	Hungary; Renáta Tobai-Sike; Zsófia Csonka; Adrienn Nemes
25 m center fire pistol	China; Jingjing Zhang; Chen Ying; Qian Wei	Mongolia; Munkzul Tsogbadrah; Otryadyn Gündegmaa; Bayartsetseg Tumurchudur	South Korea; Kim Jang-mi; Hye Jung Kwak; Lee Jung-eun
10 m air rifle	Germany; Barbara Engleder; Sonja Pfeilschifter; Lisa Mueller	China; Yi Siling; Bin Bin Zhang; Wu Liuxi	Serbia; Andrea Arsović; Ivana Maksimović; Katarina Biserčić
50 m rifle prone	Germany; Beate Gauß; Barbara Engleder; Isabella Straub	China; Dongqi Chen; Jing Chang; Yi Siling	Ukraine; Natallia Kalnysh; Lessia Leskiv; Olga Golubchenko
50 m rifle 3 positions	Germany; Beate Gauß; Barbara Engleder; Eva Rösken	China; Dongqi Chen; Huixin Zhao; Jing Chang	South Korea; Mira Jeong; Kim Seola; Seo Young Yoo
10 m running target	China; Li Xue Yan; Li Su; Yang Zeng	Russia; Julia Eydenzon; Olga Stepanova; Irina Izmalkova	Ukraine; Viktoriya Rybovalova; Galina Avramenko; Kateryna Samohina
10 m running target mixed	China; Li Su; Yang Zeng; Li Xue Yan	Russia; Olga Stepanova; Irina Izmalkova; Julia Eydenzon	Ukraine; Galina Avramenko; Viktoriya Rybovalova; Kateryna Samohina
Skeet	United Kingdom; Elena Allen; Amber Hill; Sarah Gray	Slovakia; Danka Barteková; Andrea Stranovska; Monika Stibrava	United States; Brandy Drozd; Kim Rhode; Haley Dunn
Trap	Germany; Katrin Quooss; Jana Beckmann; Christiane Goehring	Italy; Deborah Gelisio; Jessica Rossi; Silvana Stanco	Spain; Fátima Gálvez; Eva Maria Clemente; María Quintanal

== Junior ==
=== Rifle ===
Evento	Oro		Argento	
Evento	Atleta	Risultato	Atleta	Risultato
3 Position 50m	(Germany) Andre Link	1171+456,1	(France) Alexis Raynaud	1171+455,7
3 Position 50m Team	FranceAlexis Raynaud Emilien Chassat Brian Baudouin	3498	GermanyAndre Link Johannes Früh Maximilian Dalinger	3483
50m a terra	(Germany) Christoph Kaulich	629,3+207,6	(France) Alexis Raynaud	624,9+207,6
50m a terra a squadre	GermanyChristoph Kaulich Andre Link Mario Nittel	1856,6	FranceAlexis Raynaud Emilien Chassat Brian Baudouin	1855,8

Air Rifle

Evento	Oro		Argento	
Evento	Atleta	Risultato	Atleta	Risultato
10m Individual	(Russia) Vladimir Masliennikov	622,8+206,8	(Armenia) Hraczik Babajan	624,9+205,7
10m Team	FranceLorenzo BuffardAlexis RaynaudBrian Baudouin	1869,6	ChinaWang CeWu PengZhao Zhonghao	1867,2

Pistol

Evento	Oro		Argento		Bronzo	
Evento	Atleta	Risultato	Atleta	Risultato	Atleta	Risultato
25m	(United States) Alexander Chichkov	587	(Italy) Dario Di Martino	579	(North Korea) Jang Ji-won	578
25m a squadre	ChinaZhang TianshuaiWang XinyuCao Heyuan	1717	FranceVincent PoloJean QuiquampoixAntoine Adamus	1717	RussiaAndrey PoczepkoViaczeslav PierelyginAleksandr Marczev	1710
50m	(Russia) Andrey Poczepko	546+193,6	(Italy) Dario Di Martino	560+190,1	(China) Zhang Bowen	551+169,7
50m a squadre	ChinaWu JiayuZhang BowenZhang Hao	1631	RussiaAndrey PoczepkoAleksandr BassarievIevgienij Borovoy	1628	South KoreaChoi Su-yeolChoe Bo-ramKang Tae-young	1608

Air Pistol

Evento	Oro		Argento		Bronzo	
Evento	Atleta	Risultato	Atleta	Risultato	Atleta	Risultato
10m Individual	(Germany) Alexander Kindig	580+199,1	(South Korea) Choe Bo-ram	576+198,7	(Latvia) Lauris Strautmanis	577+177,8
10m Team	LatviaLauris StrautmanisEmils VasermanisKristaps Smilga	1718	ChinaQian FanghengZhang BowenWu Jiayu	1714	South KoreaChoe Bo-ramKang Tae-youngChoi Su-yeol	1710

Pistol Repeat Fire

Evento	Oro		Argento		Bronzo	
Evento	Atleta	Risultato	Atleta	Risultato	Atleta	Risultato
25m Individual	(France) Jean Quiquampoix	570+28	(Russia) Aleksandr Marczev	571+25	(South Korea) Park Jung-woo	570+21
25m Team	ChinaZhang TianshuaiWang XinyuCao Heyuan	1719	South KoreaPark Jung-wooKim Sei-junLee Kyung-won	1701	RussiaAleksandr MarczevVladislav CzudotvorovViaczeslav Pierelygin	1684

Pistol Standard

Evento	Oro		Argento		Bronzo	
Evento	Atleta	Risultato	Atleta	Risultato	Atleta	Risultato
25m Individual	(United States) Alexander Chichkov	563	(Italy) Dario Di Martino	561	(India) Pardeep Pardeep	561
25m Team	MongoliaGanbaatar BujanbaatarOjun TuguldurSzirgal Bujandzaja	1660	SwitzerlandAndreas RiedenerFrederik ZurschmiedeSimon Liesch	1651	ChinaZhang TianshuaiWang XinyuCao Heyuan	1650

Running Target

Evento	Oro		Argento		Bronzo	
Evento	Atleta	Risultato	Atleta	Risultato	Atleta	Risultato
10m Individual	(Finland) Jani Suoranta	568+7+6	(Finland) Mika Kinisjarvi	562+6+4	(Armenia) Razmik Minasian	555+0+6
10m Team	FinlandJani SuorantaMika KinisjarviHeikki Lahdekorpi	1678	RussiaArsieniy CzefonovJaroslav KliepikovDmitrij Szagalin	1633	ArmeniaRazmik MinasianSzant SarksjanHowhannes Chaczatrian	1619
MiX 10m	(Finland) Heikki Lahdekorpi	377	(Finland) Jani Suoranta	375	(Russia) Dmitrij Szagalin	373
Mix10m Team	FinlandJani SuorantaMika KinisjarviHeikki Lahdekorpi	1121	RussiaArsieniy CzefonovValerij DavydovDmitrij Szagalin	1071	ArmeniaRazmik MinasianSzant SarksjanHowhannes Chaczatrian	1062
