= 2013 European Shooting Championships =

- Dates: 21 July - 4 August
- Host city: Osijek, Croatia
- Level: Senior
- Events: 9 men + 5 women (individual); 9 men + 5 women (team)

The 2013 European Shooting Championships (25, 50, 300 m) were held in Osijek, Croatia from 21 July – 4 August 2013.

== Men's events ==
=== Pistol ===
Event	Gold	Silver	Bronze
25m Standard Pistol	Yusuf Dikeç; Turkey	Roman Bondaruk; Ukraine	Joao Costa; Portugal
25m Standard Pistol TEAM	Russia; Mikhail Nestruyev; Denis Kulakov; Leonid Yekimov	Turkey; Yusuf Dikeç; Murat Kılınç; Fatih Kavruk	Ukraine; Roman Bondaruk; Oleksandr Petriv; Ivan Bidnyak
25m Rapid Fire Pistol	Roman Bondaruk; Ukraine	Alexei Klimov; Russia	Christian Reitz; Germany
25m Rapid Fire Pistol TEAM	Germany; Christian Reitz; Aaron Sauter; Oliver Geis	Russia; Alexei Klimov; Alexander Alifirenko; Andrey Shchepetkov	Poland; Piotr Daniluk; Damian Klimek; Radosław Podgórski
25m Center Fire Pistol	Yusuf Dikeç; Turkey	Christian Reitz; Germany	Fatih Kavruk; Turkey
25m Center Fire Pistol TEAM	Turkey; Yusuf Dikeç; Fatih Kavruk; Murat Kılınç	Ukraine; Oleksandr Petriv; Roman Bondaruk; Ivan Bidnyak	Finland; Teemu Lahti; Petri Ylinen; Marko Räsänen
50m Pistol	Giuseppe Giordano; Italy	Joao Costa; Portugal	Denis Kulakov; Russia
50m Pistol TEAM	Italy; Andrea Amore; Giuseppe Giordano; Francesco Bruno	Turkey; Abdullah Ömer Alimoğlu; Yusuf Dikeç; İsmail Keleş	Russia; Denis Kulakov; Vladimir Gontcharov; Anton Gourianov

=== Rifle ===
Event	Gold	Silver	Bronze
50m Rifle Prone	Valérian Sauveplane; France	Henri Junghänel; Germany	Sergei Martynov; Belarus
50m Rifle Prone TEAM	France; Cyril Graff; Michael d'Halluin; Valérian Sauveplane	Belarus; Sergei Martynov; Vitali Bubnovich; Yury Shcherbatsevich	Denmark; Steffen Olsen; Kenneth Nielsen; Carsten Brandt
50m Rifle 3 Positions	Nazar Louginets; Russia	Valérian Sauveplane; France	Vitali Bubnovich; Belarus
50m Rifle 3 Positions TEAM	France; Cyril Graff; Michael d'Halluin; Valérian Sauveplane	Russia; Nazar Louginets; Fedor Vlasov; Denis Sokolov	Belarus; Illia Charheika; Yury Shcherbatsevich; Vitali Bubnovich

=== 300 m rifle ===
Event	Gold	Silver	Bronze
300m Standard Rifle	Michael Podolak; Austria	Marcel Bürge; Switzerland	Bernhard Pickl; Austria
300m Standard Rifle TEAM	Switzerland; Marcel Bürge; Rafael Bereuter; Olivier Schaffter	Norway; Stian Bogar; Kim Andre Lund; Ole-Kristian Bryhn	Austria; Michael Podolak; Bernhard Pickl; Martin Strempfl
300m Rifle Prone	Anders Brolund; Sweden	Marcel Bürge; Switzerland	Valérian Sauveplane; France
300m Rifle Prone TEAM	France; Valérian Sauveplane; Cyril Graff; Josselin Henry	Sweden; Stefan Ahlesved; Johan Gustafsson; Anders Brolund	Denmark; Carsten Brandt; Steffen Olsen; Rene Kristiansen
300m Rifle 3 Positions	Cyril Graff; France	Josselin Henry; France	Marcel Bürge; Switzerland
300m Rifle 3 Positions TEAM	France; Cyril Graff; Josselin Henry; Valérian Sauveplane	Switzerland; Marcel Bürge; Olivier Schaffter; Rafael Bereuter	Norway; Ole-Kristian Bryhn; Kim Andre Lund; Stian Bogar

== Women's events ==
=== Pistol ===
Event	Gold	Silver	Bronze
25m Pistol	Heidi Diethelm Gerber; Switzerland	Munkhbayar Dorjsuren; Germany	Monika Karsch; Germany
25m Pistol TEAM	Russia; Anna Mastyanina; Ekaterina Korshunova; Yuliya Alipova	Germany; Monika Karsch; Munkhbayar Dorjsuren; Antje Nöske	Serbia; Zorana Arunović; Jasna Šekarić; Danica Rašeta

=== Rifle ===
Event	Gold	Silver	Bronze
50m Rifle Prone	Natallia Kalnysh; Ukraine	Ramona Gößler; Germany	Kata Veres; Hungary
50m Rifle Prone TEAM	Ukraine; Natallia Kalnysh; Lessia Leskiv; Olga Golubchenko	Germany; Ramona Gößler; Amelie Kleinmanns; Constanze Rotzsch	Poland; Sylwia Bogacka; Paula Wrońska; Alicja Ziaja
50m Rifle 3 Positions	Amelie Kleinmanns; Germany	Snježana Pejčić; Croatia	Ivana Maksimović; Serbia
50m Rifle 3 Positions TEAM	Czech Republic; Nikola Mazurová; Adéla Sýkorová; Lucie Švecová	France; Émilie Évesque; Laurence Brize; Marie Fayolle	Poland; Paula Wrońska; Sylwia Bogacka; Agnieszka Nagay

=== 300 m rifle ===
Event	Gold	Silver	Bronze
300m Rifle Prone	Charlotte Jakobsen; Denmark	Olivia Goberville; France	Gudrun Wittmann; Germany
300m Rifle Prone TEAM	Germany; Gudrun Wittmann; Sandra Georg; Eva Friedel	Switzerland; Bettina Bucher; Marina Schnider; Myriam Brühwiler	Estonia; Liudmila Kortshagina; Anzela Voronova; Elena Potasheva
300m Rifle 3 Positions	Anzela Voronova; Estonia	Karolina Kowalczyk; Poland	Lessia Leskiv; Ukraine
300m Rifle 3 Positions TEAM	Switzerland; Bettina Bucher; Marina Schnider; Myriam Brühwiler	Poland; Karolina Kowalczyk; Sylwia Bogacka; Alicja Ziaja	Norway; Sina Oleane Busk; Eline Skovli Utne; Marianne Berger

== Men's Junior events ==
Event	Gold	Silver	Bronze
25m Pistol	Pavlo Korostylov (UKR)	Nikita Sukhanov (RUS)	Pavel Yudin (RUS)
25m Pistol TEAM	Russia	France	Germany
25m Standard Pistol	Peeter Olesk (EST)	Pavlo Korostylov (UKR)	Denis Kartashov (RUS)
25m Standard Pistol TEAM	Russia	Estonia	Ukraine
25m Rapid Fire Pistol	Ralf Hehn (GER)	Nikita Sukhanov (RUS)	Peeter Olesk (EST)
25m Rapid Fire Pistol TEAM	Germany	France	Russia
50m Pistol	Dario Di Martino (ITA)	Artsiom Lukyanavets (BLR)	Kamil Gersten (POL)
50m Pistol TEAM	Poland	Belarus	Russia
50m Rifle Prone	Roberto May (SUI)	Sandor Nagy (HUN)	Simon Weithaler (ITA)
50m Rifle Prone TEAM	Switzerland	Norway	Ukraine
50m Rifle 3 Positions	Andre Link (GER)	Simon Weithaler (ITA)	Gernot Rumpler (AUT)
50m Rifle 3 Positions TEAM	Germany	Russia	Switzerland

== Women's Junior events ==
Event	Gold	Silver	Bronze
25m Pistol	Anastasia Ryzhikh (RUS)	Nikoletta Mihalko (HUN)	Joanna Tomala (POL)
25m Pistol TEAM	Russia	Germany	Ukraine
50m Rifle Prone	Emilie Wintenberger (FRA)	Malin Westerheim (NOR)	Marisa Gregori (GER)
50m Rifle Prone TEAM	Germany	Norway	France
50m Rifle 3 Positions	Malin Westerheim (NOR)	Jaqueline Orth (GER)	Selina Gschwandtner (GER)
50m Rifle 3 Positions TEAM	Germany	Norway	Russia

== Medal summary ==
=== Seniors ===
Rank	Nation	Gold	Silver	Bronze	Total
1	France	6	4	1	11
2	Germany	3	6	3	12
3	Switzerland	3	4	1	8
4	Russia	3	3	2	8
5	Ukraine	3	2	2	7
6	Turkey	3	2	1	6
7	Italy	2	0	0	2
8	Sweden	1	1	0	2
9	Austria	1	0	2	3
9	Denmark	1	0	2	3
11	Estonia	1	0	1	2
12	Czech Republic	1	0	0	1
13	Poland	0	2	3	5
14	Belarus	0	1	3	4
15	Norway	0	1	2	3
16	Portugal	0	1	1	2
17	Croatia	0	1	0	1
18	Serbia	0	0	2	2
19	Finland	0	0	1	1
19	Hungary	0	0	1	1
Totals (20 entries)		28	28	28	84

=== Juniors ===
Rank	Nation	Gold	Silver	Bronze	Total
1	Germany	6	2	3	11
2	Russia	4	3	5	12
3	Switzerland	2	0	1	3
4	Norway	1	4	0	5
5	France	1	2	1	4
6	Ukraine	1	1	3	5
7	Estonia	1	1	1	3
7	Italy	1	1	1	3
9	Poland	1	0	2	3
10	Belarus	0	2	0	2
10	Hungary	0	2	0	2
12	Austria	0	0	1	1
Totals (12 entries)		18	18	18	54
