= Shooting at the 2015 European Games – Women's 50 metre rifle three positions =

Women's 50 m rifle 3 positions at the 2015 European Games
- Venue: Baku Shooting Centre
- Date: 19 June
- Competitors: 34 from 20 nations

Medalists
gold medal	Petra Zublasing	Italy
silver medal	Laurence Brize	France
bronze medal	Olivia Hofmann	Austria

The Women's 50 metre rifle three positions competition at the 2015 European Games in Baku, Azerbaijan was held on 19 June at the Baku Shooting Centre.

== Schedule ==
All times are local (UTC+5).

Date	Time	Event
Friday, 19 June 2015	09:00	Qualification
Friday, 19 June 2015	11:15	Final

== Results ==
=== Qualification ===
Rank	Athlete	Kneeling		Prone		Standing		Total	Xs	Notes
Rank	Athlete	1	2	1	2	1	2	Total	Xs	Notes
1	Petra Zublasing (ITA)	96	99	98	99	97	100	589	31	GR
2	Beate Gauß (GER)	99	98	99	99	97	94	586	27	
3	Natallia Kalnysh (UKR)	96	97	99	99	93	96	580	28	
4	Petra Lustenberger (SUI)	95	96	97	99	95	98	580	27	
5	Jennifer McIntosh (GBR)	97	93	97	98	97	98	580	25	
6	Laurence Brize (FRA)	98	98	98	99	94	93	580	22	
7	Olivia Hofmann (AUT)	94	94	99	98	98	96	579	25	
8	Ivana Maksimović (SRB)	95	95	99	100	96	94	579	24	
9	Yulia Karimova (RUS)	99	94	99	98	95	94	579	24	
10	Snježana Pejčić (CRO)	99	92	97	98	97	96	579	23	
11	Sabrina Sena (ITA)	98	94	100	99	95	92	578	19	
12	Amelie Kleinmanns (GER)	99	98	99	98	94	89	577	28	
13	Nikola Mazurová (CZE)	94	96	96	98	95	98	577	27	
14	Paula Wrońska (POL)	93	98	99	99	95	93	577	26	
15	Daniela Pešková (SVK)	96	95	99	99	92	96	577	25	
16	Lessia Leskiv (UKR)	98	97	100	100	92	90	577	21	
17	Polina Khorosheva (RUS)	94	96	99	96	97	94	576	22	
18	Živa Dvoršak (SLO)	97	94	98	98	95	94	576	22	
19	Agnieszka Nagay (POL)	97	97	99	96	95	92	576	22	
20	Andrea Arsović (SRB)	94	95	98	98	95	96	576	20	
21	Marina Schnider (SUI)	96	96	97	98	93	95	575	24	
22	Anzela Voronova (EST)	95	97	99	100	90	94	575	21	
23	Jana Hyblerová (SVK)	99	94	97	99	92	94	575	20	
24	Kata Zwickl-Veres (HUN)	97	95	98	99	92	94	575	19	
25	Adéla Sýkorová (CZE)	97	97	97	96	93	92	572	24	
26	Urška Kuharič (SLO)	94	94	97	98	92	96	571	19	
27	Malin Westerheim (NOR)	95	95	97	94	94	96	571	18	
28	Stine Nielsen (DEN)	96	92	99	97	93	93	570	22	
29	Stephanie Vercrusse (BEL)	95	96	94	96	93	94	568	10	
30	Lotten Johansson (SWE)	92	99	99	98	90	88	566	20	
31	Judith Gomez (FRA)	93	96	97	96	91	90	563	15	
32	Stephanie Obermoser (AUT)	94	95	97	95	91	91	563	14	
33	Rikke Ibsen (DEN)	91	95	94	97	89	97	563	11	
34	Tanja Perec (CRO)	95	90	97	97	91	91	561	15	

=== Final ===
Rank	Athlete	Knee.	Prone	Standing						Notes
Rank	Athlete	Knee.	Prone	1	2	3	4	5	6	Notes
1st place, gold medalist(s)	Petra Zublasing (ITA)	153.3	311.1	412.9	422.7	432.9	443.6	454.4	464.7	FWR
2nd place, silver medalist(s)	Laurence Brize (FRA)	151.9	306.2	405.9	416.0	425.6	435.8	446.2	454.6	
3rd place, bronze medalist(s)	Olivia Hofmann (AUT)	149.8	306.3	403.7	413.4	423.6	433.5	443.2		
4	Ivana Maksimović (SRB)	150.7	305.7	401.3	410.4	420.8	430.4			
5	Beate Gauß (GER)	146.7	301.9	400.1	410.5	419.6				
6	Petra Lustenberger (SUI)	151.9	304.8	400.3	409.5					
7	Jennifer McIntosh (GBR)	153.8	305.4	399.7						
8	Natallia Kalnysh (UKR)	147.9	300.3	397.2						
