= World and Olympic records set at the 2012 Summer Olympics =

A number of world records and Olympic records were set in various events at the 2012 Summer Olympics in London. 32 world records were broken in eight sports. The largest number of world records was set in swimming, with eight. China, Great Britain and the United States set the most records, with five each.

== Olympic and World records set by sport ==
=== Archery ===
Event	Name	Nation	Score	Date	Record
Men's individual (216 arrow ranking round)	Dong Hyun Im	South Korea	699 Points	27 July	WR, OR
Men's team	Im Dong-Hyun; Kim Bub-Min; Oh Jin-Hyek	South Korea	2087 Points	27 July	WR, OR

=== Athletics ===
Event	Name	Nation	Score	Date	Record
Women's marathon	Tiki Gelana	Ethiopia	2h 23:07	5 August	OR
Men's 100 metres	Usain Bolt	Jamaica	9.63 s	5 August	OR
Women's 100 metres hurdles	Sally Pearson	Australia	12.35 s	7 August	OR
Men's 800 metres	David Rudisha	Kenya	1:40.91	9 August	WR, OR
Women's 4 × 100 metres	Tianna Madison; Allyson Felix; Bianca Knight; Carmelita Jeter	USA	40.82 s	10 August	WR, OR
Men's 4 × 100 metres	Nesta Carter; Michael Frater; Yohan Blake; Usain Bolt	Jamaica	36.84 s	11 August	WR, OR

=== Cycling ===
Event	Name	Nation	Score	Date	Record
Women's team sprint	Gong Jinjie; Guo Shuang	China	32.447 s	2 August	WR, OR
Women's team sprint	Gong Jinjie; Guo Shuang	China	32.422 s	2 August	WR, OR
Men's team sprint	Philip Hindes; Chris Hoy; Jason Kenny	Great Britain	42.747 s	2 August	WR, OR
Men's team sprint	Philip Hindes; Chris Hoy; Jason Kenny	Great Britain	42.600 s	2 August	WR, OR
Men's team pursuit	Ed Clancy; Geraint Thomas; Steven Burke; Peter Kennaugh	Great Britain	3:52.499	2 August	WR, OR
Men's team pursuit	Ed Clancy; Geraint Thomas; Steven Burke; Peter Kennaugh	Great Britain	3:51.659	3 August	WR, OR
Women's team pursuit	Dani King; Laura Trott; Joanna Rowsell	Great Britain	3:15.669	3 August	WR, OR
Women's team pursuit	Dani King; Laura Trott; Joanna Rowsell	Great Britain	3:14.682	4 August	WR, OR
Women's team pursuit	Dani King; Laura Trott; Joanna Rowsell	Great Britain	3:14.051	4 August	WR, OR
Men's sprint	Jason Kenny	Great Britain	9.713 s	4 August	OR
Women's sprint	Victoria Pendleton	Great Britain	10.724 s	5 August	OR

=== Shooting ===
Event	Name	Nation	Score	Date	Record
Women's 25 metre pistol (Qualification)	Kim Jangmi	South Korea	591 Points	29 July	OR
Women's skeet (Qualification)	Kim Rhode	USA	74 Points	29 July	OR
Women's skeet (Final)	Kim Rhode	USA	99 Points	29 July	OR
Men's skeet (Qualification)	Vincent Hancock	USA	123 Points	30 July	OR
Men's skeet (Final)	Vincent Hancock	USA	148 Points	31 July	OR
Men's 50 metre rifle prone (Final)	Sergei Martynov	Bulgaria	705.5 Points	3 August	WR, OR
Women's 50 metre rifle three positions (Qualification)	Jamie Lynn Gray	USA	592 Points	4 August	OR
Women's 50 metre rifle three positions (Final)	Jamie Lynn Gray	USA	691.9 Points	4 August	OR
Women's trap (Qualification)	Jessica Rossi	Italy	75 Points	4 August	OR
Women's trap (Final)	Jessica Rossi	Italy	99 Points	4 August	WR, OR
Men's 25 metre rapid fire pistol (Qualification)	Alexei Klimov	Russia	592 Points	3 August	WR, OR
Men's 25 metre rapid fire pistol (Final)	Leuris Pupo	Cuba	34 Points	3 August	WR, OR
Men's trap (Qualification)	Michael Diamond	Australia	125 Points	6 August	OR
Men's 50 metre rifle three positions (Qualification)	Niccolò Campriani	Italy	1180 Points	6 August	OR
Men's 50 metre rifle three positions (Final)	Niccolò Campriani	Italy	1278.5 Points	6 August	OR

=== Swimming ===
==== Men ====
Event	Date	Round	Name	Nationality	Time	Record
Men's 400 m freestyle	28 July	Final	Sun Yang	China	3:40.14	OR
Men's 100 m breaststroke	28 July	Semifinal	Cameron van der Burgh	South Africa	58.83	OR
Men's 100 m breaststroke	29 July	Final	Cameron van der Burgh	South Africa	58.46	WR, OR
Men's 100 m backstroke	30 July	Final	Matt Grevers	United States	52.16	OR
Men's 200 m breaststroke	1 August	Final	Dániel Gyurta	Hungary	2:07.28	WR, OR
Men's 200 m backstroke	2 August	Final	Tyler Clary	United States	1:53.41	OR
Men's 1500 m freestyle	4 August	Final	Sun Yang	China	14:31.02	WR, OR

==== Women ====
Event	Date	Round	Name	Nationality	Time	Record
Women's 100 m butterfly	28 July	Heats	Dana Vollmer	United States	56.25	OR
Women's 400 m individual medley	28 July	Final	Ye Shiwen	China	4:28.43	WR, OR
Women's 4 × 100 m freestyle relay	28 July	Final	Alicia Coutts (53.90); Cate Campbell (53.19); Brittany Elmslie (53.41); Melanie Schlanger (52.65)	Australia	3:33.15	OR
Women's 100 m backstroke	29 July	Heats	Emily Seebohm	Australia	58.23	OR
Women's 100 m butterfly	29 July	Final	Dana Vollmer	United States	55.98	WR, OR
Women's 400 m freestyle	29 July	Final	Camille Muffat	France	4:01.45	OR
Women's 200 m individual medley	30 July	Semifinal	Ye Shiwen	China	2:08.39	OR
Women's 200 m freestyle	31 July	Final	Allison Schmitt	United States	1:53.61	OR
Women's 200 m individual medley	31 July	Final	Ye Shiwen	China	2:07.57	OR
Women's 100 m freestyle	1 August	Semifinal	Ranomi Kromowidjojo	Netherlands	53.05	OR
Women's 200 m butterfly	1 August	Final	Jiao Liuyang	China	2:04.06	OR
Women's 200 m breaststroke	1 August	Semifinal	Rebecca Soni	United States	2:20.00	WR, OR
Women's 4 × 200 m freestyle relay	1 August	Final	Missy Franklin (1:55.96); Dana Vollmer (1:56.02); Shannon Vreeland (1:56.85); Allison Schmitt (1:54.09)	United States	7:42.92	OR
Women's 200 m breaststroke	2 August	Final	Rebecca Soni	United States	2:19.59	WR, OR
Women's 100 m freestyle	2 August	Final	Ranomi Kromowidjojo	Netherlands	53.00	OR
Women's 200 m backstroke	3 August	Final	Missy Franklin	United States	2:04.06	WR, OR
Women's 50 m freestyle	4 August	Final	Ranomi Kromowidjojo	Netherlands	24.05	OR
Women's 4 × 100 m medley relay	4 August	Final	Missy Franklin (58.50); Rebecca Soni (1:04.82); Dana Vollmer (55.48); Allison Schmitt (53.25)	United States	3:52.05	WR, OR

=== Weightlifting ===
==== Women ====
Event	Date	Round	Name	Nationality	Weight	Record
Women's 53 kg	29 July	Clean and jerk	Zulfiya Chinshanlo	Kazakhstan	131 kg	WR, OR
Women's 53 kg	29 July	Total	Zulfiya Chinshanlo	Kazakhstan	226 kg	OR
Women's 58 kg	30 July	Snatch	Li Xueying	China	108 kg	OR
Women's 58 kg	30 July	Total	Li Xueying	China	246 kg	OR
Women's 63 kg	31 July	Total	Maiya Maneza	Kazakhstan	245 kg	OR
Women's 75 kg	3 August	Snatch	Natalia Zabolotnaya	Russia	131 kg	OR
Women's 75 kg	3 August	Clean & Jerk	Svetlana Podobedova	Kazakhstan	161 kg	OR
Women's 75 kg	3 August	Total	Natalia Zabolotnaya	Russia	291 kg	OR
Women's +75 kg	5 August	Snatch	Tatiana Kashirina	Russia	151 kg	WR, OR
Women's +75 kg	5 August	Clean & Jerk	Zhou Lulu	China	187 kg	OR
Women's +75 kg	5 August	Total	Zhou Lulu	China	333 kg	WR, OR

==== Men ====
Event	Date	Round	Name	Nationality	Weight	Record
Men's 56 kg	29 July	Clean and jerk	Om Yun-Chol	North Korea	168 kg	OR
Men's 62 kg	30 July	Snatch	Kim Un-Guk	North Korea	153 kg	OR
Men's 62 kg	30 July	Total	Kim Un-Guk	North Korea	327 kg	WR, OR
Men's 62 kg	30 July	Clean and jerk	Óscar Figueroa	Colombia	177 kg	OR
Men's 77 kg	1 August	Snatch	Lü Xiaojun	China	175 kg	WR, OR
Men's 77 kg	1 August	Total	Lü Xiaojun	China	379 kg	WR, OR
Men's 94 kg	4 August	Clean & Jerk	Ilya Ilyin	Kazakhstan	233 kg	WR, OR
Men's 94 kg	4 August	Total	Ilya Ilyin	Kazakhstan	418 kg	WR, OR

== World records set by date ==
Date	Event	Athlete	Nation	Record description	Ref
27 July 2012	Archery – Men's individual	Im Dong-Hyun	South Korea	Scored a world record of 699 in the ranking round	
27 July 2012	Archery – Men's team	Im Dong-Hyun; Kim Bub-Min; Oh Jin-Hyek	South Korea	Scored a world record of 2087 in the ranking round	
28 July 2012	Rowing – Men's coxless pair	Eric Murray; Hamish Bond	New Zealand	Set a world record time of 6:08.50 in the heats	
28 July 2012	Swimming – Women's 400 metre individual medley	Ye Shiwen	China	Set a world record time of 4:28.43 in the final	
29 July 2012	Weightlifting – Women's 53 kg	Zulfiya Chinshanlo	Kazakhstan	Set a world record at clean and jerk of 131 kg	
29 July 2012	Swimming – Women's 100 metre butterfly	Dana Vollmer	United States	Set a world record time of 55.98	
29 July 2012	Swimming – Men's 100 metre breaststroke	Cameron van der Burgh	South Africa	Set a world record time of 58.46	
30 July 2012	Weightlifting – Men's 62 kg	Kim Un-Guk	North Korea	Set a world record at total of 327 kg	
1 August 2012	Swimming – Men's 200 metre breaststroke	Dániel Gyurta	Hungary	Set a world record time of 2:07.28	
1 August 2012	Weightlifting – Men's 77 kg	Lü Xiaojun	China	Set world record at snatch of 175 kg Set world record at total of 379 kg	
1 August 2012; 2 August 2012	Swimming – Women's 200 metre breaststroke	Rebecca Soni	United States	Set a world record time of 2:20.00 in the semi-final. Set a world record time of 2:19.59 in the final.	
2 August 2012	Cycling – Women's team sprint	Victoria Pendleton; Jessica Varnish	Great Britain	Set a world record time of 32.526 in the qualification.	
2 August 2012	Cycling – Women's team sprint	Gong Jinjie; Guo Shuang	China	Set a world record time of 32.447 in the qualification. Set a world record time of 32.422 in the first round.	
2 August 2012	Cycling – Men's team pursuit	Ed Clancy; Geraint Thomas; Steven Burke; Peter Kennaugh	Great Britain	Set a world record time of 3:52.499 in the qualification. Set a world record time of 3:51.659 in the final.	
2 August 2012	Cycling – Men's team sprint	Philip Hindes; Chris Hoy; Jason Kenny	Great Britain	Set a world record time of 42.747 in the first round. Set a world record time of 42.600 in the final.	
2 August 2012	Shooting – Men's 25 metre rapid fire pistol	Alexei Klimov	Russia	Set a world record of 592 in the qualification	
3 August 2012	Cycling – Women's team pursuit	Dani King; Laura Trott; Joanna Rowsell	Great Britain	Set a world record time of 3:15.669 in the qualification.	
3 August 2012	Shooting – Men's 50 metre rifle prone	Sergei Martynov	Belarus	Set a world record result of 705.5 in the final.	
3 August 2012	Swimming – Women's 200 metre backstroke	Missy Franklin	United States	Set a world record time of 2:04.06 in the final.	
4 August 2012	Shooting – Women's trap	Jessica Rossi	Italy	Scored a world record of 75 in the qualification. Scored a world record of 99 in the final.	
4 August 2012	Cycling – Women's team pursuit	Dani King; Laura Trott; Joanna Rowsell	Great Britain	Set a world record time of 3:14.682 in the first round. Set a world record time of 3:14.051 in the final.	
4 August 2012	Swimming – Men's 1500 metre freestyle	Sun Yang	China	Set a world record time of 14:31.02 in the final.	
4 August 2012	Swimming – Women's 4 × 100 metre medley relay	Missy Franklin; Rebecca Soni; Dana Vollmer; Allison Schmitt	United States	Set a world record time of 3:52.05 in the final.	
4 August 2012	Weightlifting – Men's 94 kg	Ilya Ilyin	Kazakhstan	Set a world record at clean and jerk of 233 kg. Set a world record total of 418 kg.	
5 August 2012	Weightlifting – Women's +75 kg	Tatiana Kashirina	Russia	Set a world record at snatch of 151 kg.	
5 August 2012	Weightlifting – Women's +75 kg	Zhou Lulu	China	Set a world record total of 333 kg.	
9 August 2012	Athletics – Men's 800 metres	David Rudisha	Kenya	Set a world record time of 1:40.91 in the final.	
10 August 2012	Athletics – Women's 4 × 100 metres relay	Tianna Madison; Allyson Felix; Bianca Knight; Carmelita Jeter	United States	Set a world record time of 40.82 in the final.	
11 August 2012	Athletics – Women's 20 kilometres walk	Elena Lashmanova	Russia	Set a world record time of 1:25.02.	
11 August 2012	Athletics – Men's 4 × 100 metres relay	Nesta Carter; Michael Frater; Yohan Blake; Usain Bolt	Jamaica	Set a world record time of 36.84 in the final.	
11 August 2012	Modern Pentathlon – Men's	Nicola Benedetti	Italy	Set a world record time of 9:23.63 in the running element.	
12 August 2012	Modern Pentathlon – Women's	Anastasiya Prokopenko	Belarus	Set a world record time of 10:20.90 in the running element.	
