= Ukrainian Shooting Federation =

Governing body

- Sport: ISSF Shooting Sports
- Jurisdiction: National
- Abbreviation: USF
- Affiliation: ISSF
- Regional affiliation: ESC
- Headquarters: Kyiv
- President: Oleg Volkov

Official website
- shooting-ukraine.com
- (Ukraine)

The Ukrainian Shooting Federation (Ukrainian: Федерація стрільби України) is the national governing body for ISSF shooting sport disciplines in Ukraine.

== History ==
In May 2022 it was reported that two well known athletes had been killed fighting in the 2022 Russian invasion of Ukraine. As a Junior, Ivan Bidnyak had medalled at the European Championships in 2005, and had won Ukraine's first shooting quota place to the 2012 Olympic Games. Twenty-one year old Ehor Kihitov was a member of Ukraine's junior team.

In November 2022, Federation President Oleg Volkov called on IOC President Thomas Bach to prevent Russian oligarch Vladimir Lisin from standing for re-election as ISSF President at the 70th General Assembly. This followed calls throughout 2022 for Lisin to step down, following the Russian invasion of Ukraine. Italian Luciano Rossi narrowly won the election 136 votes to 127.

== World Class Performance ==
Ukraine has produced a number of Olympic and world class shooters, who have won 9 Olympic shooting medals since 2000.

Shooting Medals at the Summer Olympic Games

| Games | Athletes | Event | Medal |
|---|---|---|---|
| 2000 | Mykola Milchev | Men's Skeet | 1st place, gold medalist(s) |
| 2004 | Olena Kostevych | Women's 10m air pistol | 1st place, gold medalist(s) |
| 2008 | Artur Ayvazyan | 50m rifle prone | 1st place, gold medalist(s) |
| 2008 | Oleksandr Petriv | 25m rapid fire pistol | 1st place, gold medalist(s) |
| 2008 | Jury Sukhorukov | 50m rifle 3 positions | 2nd place, silver medalist(s) |
| 2012 | Olena Kostevych | Women's 25m pistol | 3rd place, bronze medalist(s) |
| 2012 | Olena Kostevych | Women's 10m air pistol | 3rd place, bronze medalist(s) |
| 2016 | Serhiy Kulish | Men's 10m Air Rifle | 2nd place, silver medalist(s) |
| 2020 | Oleh Omelchuk; Olena Kostevych | Mixed 10m air pistol team | 3rd place, bronze medalist(s) |
