= Charlotte Jakobsen =

Danish sports shooter (born 1981)

Personal information
- Nationality: Danish
- Born: 12 May 1981 (age 45) Gedved, Denmark
- Height: 1.77 m (5 ft 10 in)

Sport
- Country: Denmark
- Sport: Sports shooting
- Events: 300 metre rifle prone; 300 metre rifle three positions
Medal record
Women's shooting
Representing Denmark
World Championships
Gold medal – first place	2002 Lahti	300m Rifle Prone
Gold medal – first place	2002 Lahti	300m Rifle Three Positions
Bronze medal – third place	2006 Zagreb	300m Rifle Prone
Gold medal – first place	2006 Zagreb	300m Rifle Three Positions
Silver medal – second place	2010 Munich	300m Rifle Prone
Silver medal – second place	2010 Munich	300m Rifle Three Positions
Gold medal – first place	2014 Granada	300m Rifle Prone
Silver medal – second place	2025 Cairo	50 m rifle prone team
European Championships
Silver medal – second place	2003 Plzeň	300m Rifle Three Positions
Gold medal – first place	2005 Belgrade	300m Rifle Prone
Bronze medal – third place	2007 Granada	300m Rifle Three Positions
Silver medal – second place	2007 Granada	300m Rifle Prone
Gold medal – first place	2009 Osijek	300m Rifle Prone
Gold medal – first place	2009 Osijek	300m Rifle Three Positions
Bronze medal – third place	2011 Belgrade	300m Rifle Three Positions
Gold medal – first place	2013 Osijek	300m Rifle Prone

Charlotte Jakobsen (born 12 May 1981) is a Danish sports shooter. She competed in the 300 meter rifle prone and 300 meter rifle three positions events at multiple World and European Championships.

As of 2020, she is the world record co-holder in the 300 meter rifle prone ISSF event.

Current world records held in 300 meter rifle prone
Women	Individual	599	Charlotte Jakobsen (DEN); Bettina Bucher (SWI); Charlotte Jakobsen (DEN); Seonaid McIntosh (GBR)	21 July 2009; 9 August 2010; 23 September 2019; 24 September 2019	Osijek (CRO); Munich (GER); Tolmezzo (ITA); Tolmezzo (ITA)
