= Shooting at the 2012 Summer Olympics – Men's 25 metre rapid fire pistol =

Olympic shooting event

Men's 25 metre rapid fire pistol at the Games of the XXX Olympiad
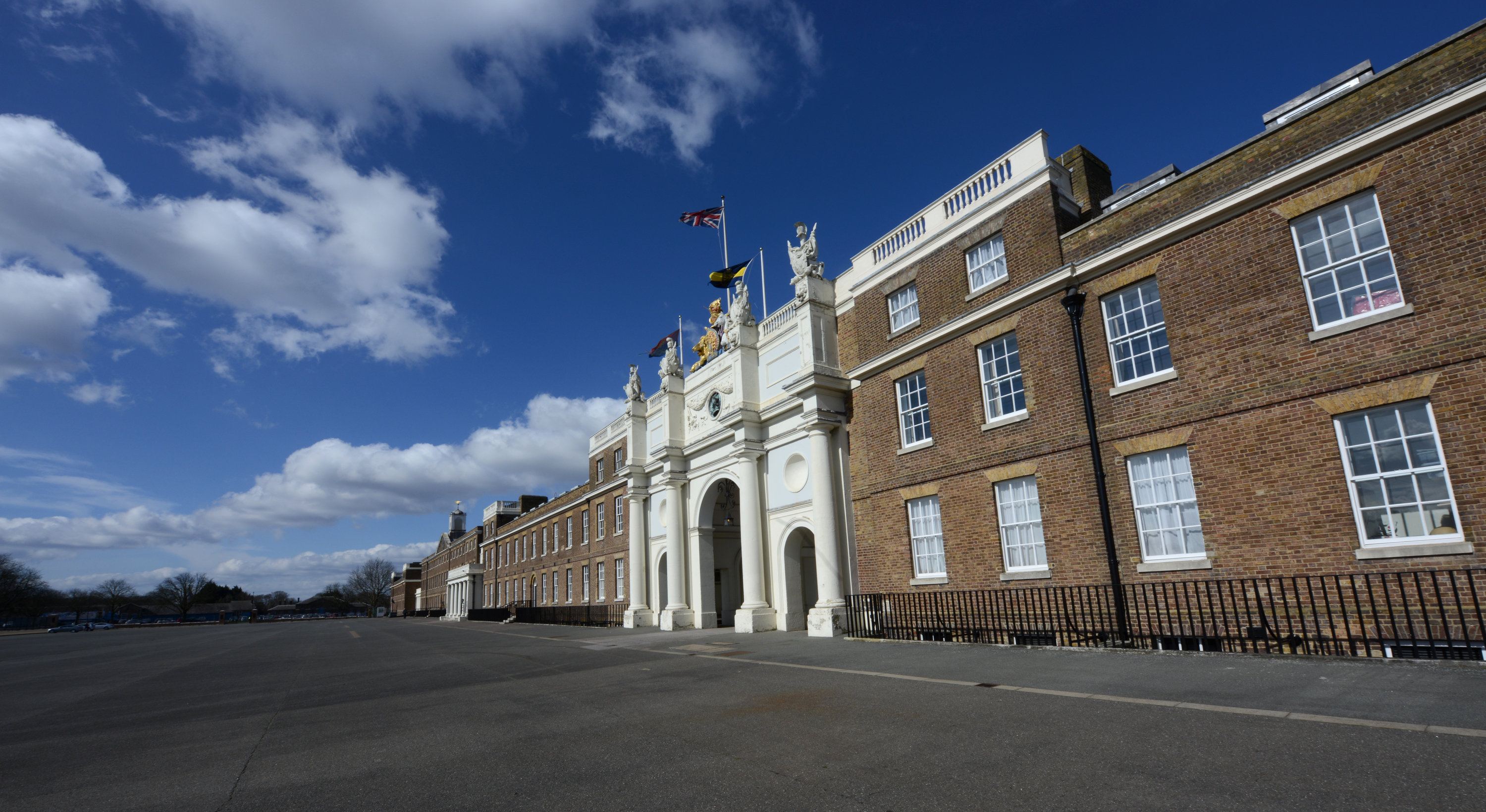
- Royal Artillery Barracks
- Venue: Royal Artillery Barracks
- Dates: 2 August 2012; 3 August 2012
- Competitors: 18 from 13 nations
- Winning score: 34

Medalists
1st place, gold medalist(s)		Leuris Pupo; Cuba
2nd place, silver medalist(s)		Vijay Kumar; India
3rd place, bronze medalist(s)		Ding Feng; China

The men's ISSF 25 meter rapid fire pistol event at the 2012 Olympic Games was held on 2 and 3 August 2012 at the Royal Artillery Barracks. There were 18 competitors from 13 nations. The event was won by Leuris Pupo of Cuba. Silver went to Vijay Kumar of India, while Ding Feng of China took bronze. It was the first medal in the event for all three nations. Ralf Schumann missed the final for the first time; he had reached the final in the previous six Games (winning five medals, three gold and two silver).

== Background ==
This was the 24th appearance of what had been standardised in 1948 as the men's ISSF 25 meter rapid fire pistol event, the only event on the 2020 programme that traces back to 1896. The event has been held at every Summer Olympics except 1904 and 1928 (when no shooting events were held) and 1908; it was nominally open to women from 1968 to 1980, although very few women participated these years. There is no women's equivalent on the Olympic programme, as of 2021. The first five events were quite different, with some level of consistency finally beginning with the 1932 event—which, though it had differences from the 1924 competition, was roughly similar. The 1936 competition followed the 1932 one quite closely. The post-World War II event substantially altered the competition once again. The 1984 Games introduced women's-only shooting events, including the ISSF 25 meter pistol (though this is more similar to the non-Olympic men's ISSF 25 meter center-fire pistol than the rapid fire pistol).

Five of the six finalists from 2008 returned: silver medalist (and 1992, 1996, and 2004 gold and 1988 silver medalist) Ralf Schumann of Germany, bronze medalist Christian Reitz of Germany, fourth-place finisher Leonid Yekimov of Russia, fifth-place finisher Keith Sanderson of the United States, and sixth-place finisher Roman Bondaruk of Ukraine. The 2010 world champion and runner-up were Alexei Klimov of Russia and Zhang Jian of China, respectively. Klimov held the world record for the qualifying round and shared the world record with Reitz for the new final round format.

This was the third Games in which no nation made its debut in the event. The United States made its 20th appearance, most of any nation.

== Qualification ==
Each National Olympic Committee (NOC) could enter up to two shooters if the NOC earned enough quota sports or had enough crossover-qualified shooters. To compete, a shooter needed a quota spot and to achieve a Minimum Qualification Score (MQS). Once a shooter was using a quota spot in any shooting event, they could enter any other shooting event for which they had achieved the MQS as well (a crossover qualification). There were 16 quota spots available for the rapid fire pistol: 2 at the 2010 World Championship, 8 at the 2011 World Cup events (2 spots at each of 4 events), and 6 for continental champions (2 each for Europe and Asia, 1 each for Americas and Oceania). There was also 1 re-allocated place. In 2012, one crossover qualification was used in the rapid fire pistol: Jakkrit Panichpatikum of Thailand had qualified and used a quota spot in the 50 metre pistol and also achieved the rapid fire pistol MQS; he competed in both events (as well as the 10 metre air pistol).

== Competition format ==
The competition format continued to use the two-round (qualifying round and final) format, as in 1988 and since 1996, with the third final format in as many Games. The 2005 rules changes also required the pistols used to be sport pistols, banning .22 Short cartridges.

The qualifying round from 1988 onward was essentially the same as the full competition format from 1948–1984. Each shooter fired 60 shots. These were done in two courses of 30; each course consisted of two stages of 15; each stage consisted of three series of 5. In each stage, the time limit for each series was 8 seconds for the first, 6 seconds for the second, and 4 seconds for the third.

The 1988 tournament had added a two-series final for the top eight shooters; the 1992 competition broke that down to a four-series semifinal for the top eight and two-series final for the top four. In 1996 and 2000, the top eight once again advanced to the final. The 2004 version had reduced the number of finalists to six, where it stayed in 2008 and 2012.

Prior to 2008, the final involved two series of 5 shots at 4 seconds. In 2008, that was expanded to four series. The 2012 competition used an entirely different format, however. The competition switched to a "hit-or-miss" system, where a 9.7 or better scores as a "hit" for 1 point and anything lower scores as a "miss" for 0 points. The final featured 8 series of 5 shots each (5 points maximum per series, 40 points maximum total). However, starting with the fourth series, the remaining shooter with the lowest total was eliminated after each series (5 shooters remaining in the fifth series, 4 in the sixth, 3 in the seventh, and only 2 in the eighth and final series).

The 1992 competition had introduced round targets rather than the silhouettes used from 1948 to 1988 as well as many pre-World War II versions of the event. Score, rather than hits, had been used as the primary ranking method since 1960.

== Records ==
Prior to this competition, the existing world and Olympic records were as follows.

Qualifying records
World record	Alexei Klimov (RUS)	591	Granada, Spain	6 October 2006
Olympic record	Keith Sanderson (USA)	583	Beijing, China	16 August 2008

Final records
World record	Alexei Klimov (RUS); Christian Reitz (GER)	34	Milan, Italy	19 May 2012
Olympic record	New format for 2012 Olympics	–	–	–

== Schedule ==
Date	Time	Round
Thursday, 2 August 2012		Qualifying: Course 1
Friday, 3 August 2012	14:30	Qualifying: Course 2 Final

== Results ==
=== Qualifying ===
Rank	Shooter	Nation	Course 1				Course 2				Total	Notes
Rank	Shooter	Nation	8 seconds	6 seconds	4 seconds	Total	8 seconds	6 seconds	4 seconds	Total	Total	Notes
1	Alexei Klimov	Russia	98	100	96	294	99	99	100	298	592	Q, WR
2	Ding Feng	China	98	98	97	293	99	99	97	295	588	Q
3	Leuris Pupo	Cuba	99	98	96	293	99	98	96	293	586	Q
4	Vijay Kumar	India	99	96	98	293	98	97	97	292	585	Q
5	Zhang Jian	China	98	98	97	293	99	97	91	291	584	Q
6	Christian Reitz	Germany	99	98	95	292	97	97	97	291	583	Q
7	Martin Podhráský	Czech Republic	96	98	99	293	99	95	96	290	583	
8	Leonid Yekimov	Russia	96	98	95	289	99	97	97	293	582	
9	Martin Strnad	Czech Republic	98	97	92	287	97	99	97	293	580	
10	Kim Dae-Yoong	South Korea	98	98	94	290	97	95	97	289	579	
11	Jorge Llames	Spain	99	95	94	288	96	99	96	291	579	
12	Roman Bondaruk	Ukraine	98	94	92	284	99	99	97	295	579	
13	Emil Milev	United States	98	98	96	292	98	94	94	286	578	
14	Keith Sanderson	United States	98	96	94	288	99	97	94	290	578	
15	Jakkrit Panichpatikum	Thailand	99	99	93	291	97	97	93	287	578	
16	Ralf Schumann	Germany	96	97	94	287	97	98	95	290	577	
17	Afanasijs Kuzmins	Latvia	98	97	94	289	96	93	91	280	569	
18	David Chapman	Australia	82	94	92	278	97	91	93	281	559	

=== Final ===
Rank	Athlete	Nation	1	2	3	4	Int	5	Int	6	Int	7	Int	8	Total	Notes
1st place, gold medalist(s)	Leuris Pupo	Cuba	3	5	5	5	18	4	22	4	26	4	30	4	34	=WR, OR
2nd place, silver medalist(s)	Vijay Kumar	India	5	4	4	3	16	4	20	4	24	4	28	2	30	
3rd place, bronze medalist(s)	Ding Feng	China	4	5	4	3	16	4	20	4	24	3	27	—N/a		
4	Alexei Klimov	Russia	5	4	3	2	14	4	18	5	23	—N/a				
5	Zhang Jian	China	3	5	4	2	14	3	17	—N/a						
6	Christian Reitz	Germany	3	3	4	3	13	—N/a								
