= Aleksandr Sokolov (sport shooter, born 1985) =

Russian sport shooter

Personal information
- Born: April 12, 1985 (age 41) Irkutsk, Russia
- Height: 173 cm (5 ft 8 in)
- Weight: 64 kg (141 lb)

Sport
- Sport: Shooting
- Event: rifle
- Coached by: Viktor Sokolov, Eugeniy Krainov
Medal record
Representing Russia
European Shooting Championships
Silver medal – second place	Brestia 2011	10m air rifle

Aleksandr Viktorovich Sokolov (Russian: Александр Викторович Соколов, born 12 April 1985) is a Russian sport shooter who won three gold, two silver and two bronze medals in rifle events at the European championships in 2003-2011. He placed 20the at the 2012 Summer Olympics in the Men's 10 metre air rifle.

His elder brother Denis and sister Liliya are also competitive sport shooters. They are all coached by their father Viktor.
