= Shooting at the 2012 Summer Olympics – Men's 50 metre rifle three positions =

Men's 50 metre rifle three positions at the Games of the XXX Olympiad
- Venue: Royal Artillery Barracks
- Date: 6 August 2012
- Competitors: 41 from 28 nations
- Winning score: 1278.5

Medalists
| 1st place, gold medalist(s) | | Niccolò Campriani | Italy |
| 2nd place, silver medalist(s) | | Kim Jong-Hyun | South Korea |
| 3rd place, bronze medalist(s) | | Matthew Emmons | United States |

The men's 50 metre rifle three positions event at the 2012 Olympic Games took place on 6 August 2012 at the Royal Artillery Barracks.

The event consisted of two rounds: a qualifier and a final. In the qualifier, each shooter fired 120 shots with a .22 Long Rifle at 50 metres distance. 40 shots were fired each from the standing, kneeling, and prone positions. Scores for each shot were in increments of 1, with a maximum score of 10.

The top 8 shooters in the qualifying round moved on to the final round. There the shooters go through the new ISSF final, which consists of 45 shots, if you make it through the entirety of the final. The shooters start off in the kneeling position, where they fire three series of five shots, with decimal scoring. Then the shooters move on, to changeover and sighting time, which first consists of seven minutes. Then the shooters go into the prone position, where again they shoot three series of five shoots, on decimal scoring. The second changeover time, for the standing position, consists of nine minutes. The athletes shoot two series of five shoots, with decimal scorings. When the first two series are done, seventh and eight place are "eliminated, " kicked out of the competition. Then after every shot, the athlete with the lowest score is eliminated, until the best shooter is found.

In 2012, the finals were shot under the old format, with the qualification scores carrying over into the final, and only ten shots in the standing position are fired, in decimal scores.

== Records ==
Prior to this competition, the existing world and Olympic records were as follows.

Qualification records
| World record | Rajmond Debevec (SLO) | 1186 | Munich, Germany | 29 August 1992 |
| Olympic record | Rajmond Debevec (SLO) | 1177 | Sydney, Australia | 23 September 2000 |

Final records
| World record | Rajmond Debevec (SLO) | 1287.9 (1186+101.9) | Munich, Germany | 29 August 1992 |
| Olympic record | Rajmond Debevec (SLO) | 1275.1 (1177+98.1) | Sydney, Australia | 23 September 2000 |

== Qualification round ==
| Rank | Athlete | Country | Prone | Standing | Kneeling | Total | Notes |
|---|---|---|---|---|---|---|---|
| 1 | Niccolò Campriani | Italy | 396 | 390 | 394 | 1180 | Q, OR |
| 2 | Matthew Emmons | United States | 396 | 386 | 390 | 1172 | Q |
| 3 | Cyril Graff | France | 395 | 385 | 391 | 1171 | Q |
| 4 | Yury Shcherbatsevich | Belarus | 399 | 380 | 392 | 1171 | Q |
| 5 | Kim Jong-Hyun | South Korea | 396 | 385 | 390 | 1171 | Q |
| 6 | Zhu Qinan | China | 392 | 390 | 388 | 1170 | Q |
| 7 | Ole Kristian Bryhn | Norway | 397 | 385 | 387 | 1169 | Q |
| 8 | Péter Sidi | Hungary | 394 | 389 | 385 | 1168 | Q, Shoot-off: 48.2 |
| 9 | Han Jin-Seop | South Korea | 398 | 378 | 392 | 1168 | Shoot-off: 48.1 |
| 10 | Artur Ayvazyan | Ukraine | 397 | 383 | 388 | 1168 | Shoot-off: 47.8 |
| 11 | Marcel Bürge | Switzerland | 397 | 384 | 387 | 1168 | Shoot-off: 45.9 |
| 12 | Thomas Farnik | Austria | 394 | 382 | 391 | 1167 | |
| 13 | Valérian Sauveplane | France | 394 | 382 | 391 | 1167 | |
| 14 | Serhiy Kulish | Ukraine | 390 | 387 | 389 | 1166 | |
| 15 | Marco De Nicolo | Italy | 394 | 380 | 391 | 1165 | |
| 16 | Artem Khadjibekov | Russia | 399 | 377 | 389 | 1165 | |
| 17 | Vitali Bubnovich | Belarus | 396 | 380 | 388 | 1164 | |
| 18 | Denis Sokolov | Russia | 396 | 375 | 393 | 1164 | |
| 19 | Simon Beyeler | Switzerland | 394 | 379 | 391 | 1164 | |
| 20 | Gagan Narang | India | 398 | 377 | 389 | 1164 | |
| 21 | Maik Eckhardt | Germany | 397 | 382 | 384 | 1163 | |
| 22 | Are Hansen | Norway | 397 | 382 | 384 | 1163 | |
| 23 | Nemanja Mirosavljev | Serbia | 392 | 379 | 391 | 1162 | |
| 24 | Anton Rizov | Bulgaria | 395 | 378 | 389 | 1162 | |
| 25 | James Huckle | Great Britain | 392 | 384 | 386 | 1162 | |
| 26 | Sanjeev Rajput | India | 395 | 378 | 388 | 1161 | |
| 27 | Rajmond Debevec | Slovenia | 395 | 378 | 388 | 1161 | |
| 28 | Peter Hellenbrand | Netherlands | 395 | 385 | 380 | 1160 | |
| 29 | Lan Xing | China | 397 | 378 | 384 | 1159 | |
| 30 | Jason Parker | United States | 398 | 383 | 380 | 1159 | |
| 31 | Jozef Gönci | Slovakia | 395 | 381 | 381 | 1157 | |
| 32 | Daniel Brodmeier | Germany | 398 | 374 | 384 | 1156 | |
| 33 | Nyantain Bayaraa | Mongolia | 393 | 382 | 379 | 1154 | |
| 34 | Václav Haman | Czech Republic | 395 | 374 | 384 | 1153 | |
| 35 | Bojan Durković | Croatia | 396 | 369 | 387 | 1152 | |
| 36 | Javier López | Spain | 396 | 375 | 380 | 1151 | |
| 37 | Dane Sampson | Australia | 392 | 381 | 378 | 1151 | |
| 38 | Nedžad Fazlija | Bosnia and Herzegovina | 392 | 372 | 385 | 1149 | |
| 39 | Midori Yajima | Japan | 394 | 367 | 387 | 1148 | |
| 40 | Ruslan Ismailov | Kyrgyzstan | 392 | 376 | 378 | 1146 | |
| 41 | Jonathan Hammond | Great Britain | 395 | 361 | 386 | 1142 | |

== Final ==
| Rank | Athlete | Qual | 1 | 2 | 3 | 4 | 5 | 6 | 7 | 8 | 9 | 10 | Final | Total |
|---|---|---|---|---|---|---|---|---|---|---|---|---|---|---|
| 1st place, gold medalist(s) | Niccolò Campriani (ITA) | 1180 | 10.2 | 9.3 | 9.7 | 9.1 | 10.7 | 9.9 | 10.4 | 10.5 | 9.7 | 9.0 | 98.5 | 1278.5 (OR) |
| 2nd place, silver medalist(s) | Kim Jong-Hyun (KOR) | 1171 | 10.3 | 10.7 | 9.4 | 10.2 | 10.6 | 10.0 | 10.3 | 10.1 | 9.5 | 10.4 | 101.5 | 1272.5 |
| 3rd place, bronze medalist(s) | Matthew Emmons (USA) | 1172 | 9.2 | 9.8 | 10.1 | 10.5 | 10.4 | 9.9 | 10.7 | 10.6 | 10.5 | 7.6 | 99.3 | 1271.3 |
| 4 | Cyril Graff (FRA) | 1171 | 10.1 | 9.9 | 10.3 | 9.7 | 9.4 | 10.1 | 9.9 | 9.9 | 10.3 | 10.4 | 100.0 | 1271.0 |
| 5 | Zhu Qinan (CHN) | 1170 | 10.1 | 10.2 | 9.4 | 10.8 | 10.3 | 10.3 | 9.4 | 9.9 | 10.3 | 9.5 | 100.2 | 1270.2 |
| 6 | Péter Sidi (HUN) | 1168 | 10.5 | 9.8 | 10.6 | 9.3 | 9.7 | 10.0 | 10.1 | 10.2 | 10.2 | 10.6 | 101.0 | 1269.0 |
| 7 | Ole Kristian Bryhn (NOR) | 1169 | 10.7 | 9.9 | 9.8 | 8.1 | 10.4 | 8.8 | 9.7 | 10.7 | 10.5 | 10.2 | 98.8 | 1267.8 |
| 8 | Yury Shcherbatsevich (BLR) | 1171 | 9.0 | 10.6 | 9.6 | 9.5 | 9.5 | 8.8 | 9.4 | 10.7 | 9.7 | 9.5 | 96.3 | 1267.3 |
