= Shooting at the 2008 Summer Olympics – Men's 25 metre rapid fire pistol =

Olympic shooting event

Men's 25 metre rapid fire pistol at the Games of the XXIX Olympiad
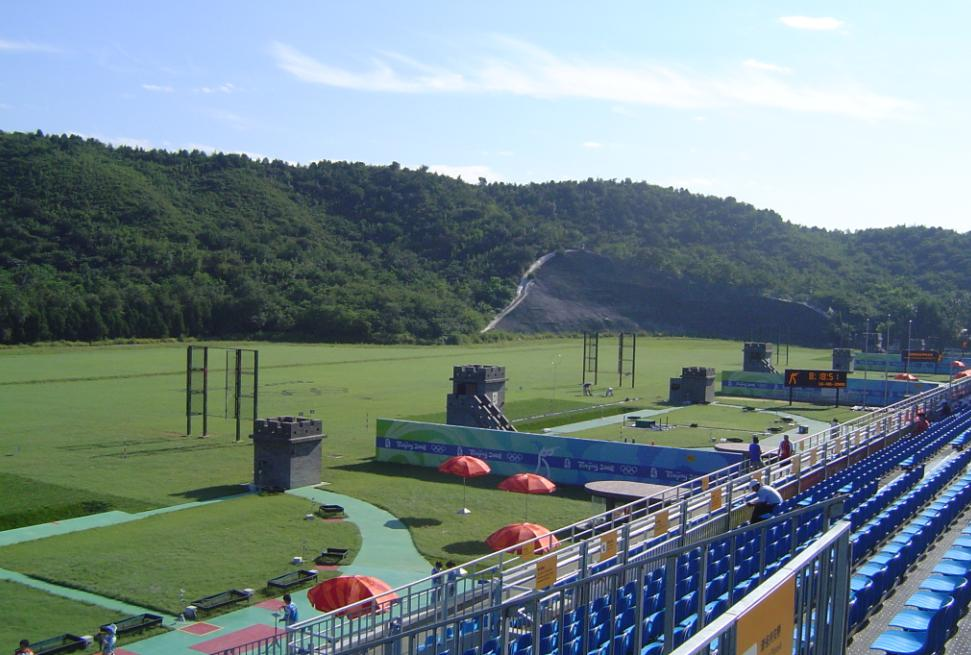
- Beijing Shooting Range
- Venue: Beijing Shooting Range Hall
- Date: August 15, 2008; August 16, 2008
- Competitors: 19 from 14 nations
- Winning score: 780.2 OR

Medalists
1st place, gold medalist(s)		Oleksandr Petriv; Ukraine
2nd place, silver medalist(s)		Ralf Schumann; Germany
3rd place, bronze medalist(s)		Christian Reitz; Germany

The men's ISSF 25 meter rapid fire pistol event at the 2008 Olympic Games took place on August 15 and 16 at the Beijing Shooting Range Hall. There were 19 competitors from 14 nations. The event was won by Oleksandr Petriv of Ukraine, the nation's first medal in the event. Germany took silver (Ralf Schumann) and bronze (Christian Reitz). It was Schumann's fifth and final Olympic medal in the event; with three golds and two silvers, he was individually more successful than any nation other than Germany. After rule changes, new Olympic records were established by Keith Sanderson (qualification round) and Petriv (final).

== Background ==
This was the 23rd appearance of what had been standardised in 1948 as the men's ISSF 25 meter rapid fire pistol event, the only event on the 2020 programme that traces back to 1896. The event has been held at every Summer Olympics except 1904 and 1928 (when no shooting events were held) and 1908; it was nominally open to women from 1968 to 1980, although very few women participated these years. The first five events were quite different, with some level of consistency finally beginning with the 1932 event—which, though it had differences from the 1924 competition, was roughly similar. The 1936 competition followed the 1932 one quite closely. The post-World War II event substantially altered the competition once again. The 1984 Games introduced women's-only shooting events, including the ISSF 25 meter pistol (though this is more similar to the non-Olympic men's ISSF 25 meter center-fire pistol than the rapid fire pistol).

Two of the six finalists from 2004 returned: gold medalist (and 1992 and 1996 gold and 1988 silver medalist) Ralf Schumann of Germany and fifth-place finisher (and 2000 bronze medalist) Iulian Raicea of Romania. The 2006 world champion and runner-up were both from China: Zhang Penghui and Liu Zhongsheng. Schumann was favored once again.

The Czech Republic made its debut in the event. The United States made its 19th appearance, most of any nation.

== Qualification ==
Each National Olympic Committee (NOC) could enter up to two shooters if the NOC earned enough quota sports or had enough crossover-qualified shooters. To compete, a shooter needed a quota spot and to achieve a Minimum Qualification Score (MQS). Once a shooter was using a quota spot in any shooting event, they could enter any other shooting event for which they had achieved the MQS as well (a crossover qualification). There were 18 quota spots used for the rapid fire pistol: 1 for the host nation, 4 at the 2006 World Cup events, 2 at the 2006 World Championship, 4 at the 2007 World Cup events, 1 each at the 2007 European Championships, 2007 Pan American Games, 2007 Oceania Championships, and 2008 Asian Championships, and 3 re-allocated places. In 2008, one crossover qualification was used in the rapid fire pistol: Júlio Almeida of Brazil had qualified and used a quota spot in the 10 metre air pistol and also achieved the rapid fire pistol MQS; he competed in both events (as well as the 50 metre pistol).

== Competition format ==
The competition format continued to use the two-round (qualifying round and final) format, as in 1988 and since 1996, with a change to the format of the final to increase the number of shots. The 2005 rules changes also required the pistols used to be sport pistols, banning .22 Short cartridges.

The qualifying round from 1988 onward was essentially the same as the full competition format from 1948–1984. Each shooter fired 60 shots. These were done in two courses of 30; each course consisted of two stages of 15; each stage consisted of three series of 5. In each stage, the time limit for each series was 8 seconds for the first, 6 seconds for the second, and 4 seconds for the third.

The 1988 tournament had added a two-series final for the top eight shooters; the 1992 competition broke that down to a four-series semifinal for the top eight and two-series final for the top four. In 1996 and 2000, the top eight once again advanced to the final. The 2004 version had reduced the number of finalists to six, where it stayed in 2008.

In the final, each shooter fired four five-shot series at 4 seconds. Scoring in the final was to 1/10 of a point, with each shot worth up to 10.9 points (for a final round maximum of 218, and total maximum of 818).

The 1992 competition had introduced round targets rather than the silhouettes used from 1948 to 1988 as well as many pre-World War II versions of the event. Score, rather than hits, had been used as the primary ranking method since 1960.

== Records ==
Prior to this competition, the existing world and Olympic records were as follows.

Qualifying records
World record	Alexei Klimov (RUS); Christian Reitz (GER)	591	Granada, Spain; Milan, Italy	6 October 2006; 28 May 2008
Olympic record	ISSF Rule changed on 01.01.2005	–	–	–

Final records
World record	Christian Reitz (GER)	794.0 (591+203.0)	Milan, Italy	28 May 2008
Olympic record	ISSF Rule changed on 01.01.2005	–	–	–

== Schedule ==
Date	Time	Round
Friday, 15 August 2008	13:00	Qualifying: Course 1
Saturday, 16 August 2008	9:00; 12:00	Qualifying: Course 2 Final

== Results ==
=== Qualifying ===
The first stage began at 13:00 China Standard Time (UTC+8) on Friday. The second stage began at 09:00 on Saturday.

Rank	Shooter	Nation	Course 1				Course 2				Total	Notes
Rank	Shooter	Nation	8 seconds	6 seconds	4 seconds	Total	8 seconds	6 seconds	4 seconds	Total	Total	Notes
1	Keith Sanderson	United States	97	98	94	289	99	99	96	294	583	Q, OR
2	Leonid Yekimov	Russia	99	95	97	291	99	96	95	290	581	Q
3	Roman Bondaruk	Ukraine	96	94	96	286	100	97	97	294	580	Q
4	Oleksandr Petriv	Ukraine	96	99	94	289	98	96	97	291	580	Q
5	Ralf Schumann	Germany	97	99	92	288	99	97	95	291	579	Q
6	Christian Reitz	Germany	97	100	92	289	99	97	94	290	579	Q
7	Leuris Pupo	Cuba	96	97	95	288	97	96	97	290	578	
8	Aleksey Klimov	Russia	99	99	90	288	95	96	98	289	577	
9	Iulian Raicea	Romania	99	95	93	287	99	95	95	289	576	
10	Liu Zhongsheng	China	96	95	90	281	98	96	97	291	572	2 points deducted (45° rule violation)
11	Júlio Almeida	Brazil	98	96	90	284	98	100	86	284	568	
12	Ghenadie Lisoconi	Moldova	95	96	91	282	93	95	97	285	567	
13	Afanasijs Kuzmins	Latvia	95	92	90	277	98	96	94	288	565	
14	Martin Podhráský	Czech Republic	92	98	86	276	99	98	92	289	565	
15	Hasli Izwan Amir Hasan	Malaysia	96	95	88	279	95	95	85	285	564	
16	Martin Strnad	Czech Republic	96	94	77	267	99	99	97	295	562	
17	Bruce Quick	Australia	94	97	89	280	95	95	90	280	560	
18	Wong Fai	Hong Kong	96	97	89	282	98	92	86	276	558	
19	Zhang Penghui	China	96	100	92	288		DSQ				Repeated 45° rule violation

=== Final ===
Rank	Shooter	Nation	Qualifying	Final					Total	Notes
Rank	Shooter	Nation	Qualifying	Series 1	Series 2	Series 3	Series 4	Total	Total	Notes
1st place, gold medalist(s)	Oleksandr Petriv	Ukraine	580	50.8	50.2	48.4	50.8	200.2	780.2	OR
2nd place, silver medalist(s)	Ralf Schumann	Germany	579	49.2	49.5	50.2	51.6	200.5	779.5	
3rd place, bronze medalist(s)	Christian Reitz	Germany	579	50.8	49.1	52.4	48.0	200.3	779.3	
4	Leonid Yekimov	Russia	581	46.6	50.9	51.0	48.7	197.2	778.2	
5	Keith Sanderson	United States	583	48.6	48.0	47.5	49.5	193.6	776.6	
6	Roman Bondaruk	Ukraine	580	49.4	49.6	49.0	46.7	194.7	774.7	
