= Ralf Schumann =

German 25 m rapid fire pistol shooter

Personal information
- Nationality: Germany
- Born: 10 June 1962 (age 64) Meissen, East Germany
- Height: 1.67 m (5 ft 6 in)
- Weight: 72 kg (159 lb)

Sport
- Sport: Shooting
- Event: 25 metre rapid fire pistol
Medal record
Event	1st	2nd	3rd
Olympic Games	3	2	-
World Championships	4	1	2
World Cup Final	13	2	3
European Championships	7	2	1
Total	27	7	6
Summer Olympics
Men's shooting
Representing Germany
Gold medal – first place	1992 Barcelona	25 m rapid fire pistol
Gold medal – first place	1996 Atlanta	25 m rapid fire pistol
Gold medal – first place	2004 Athens	25 m rapid fire pistol
Silver medal – second place	2008 Beijing	25 m rapid fire pistol
Representing East Germany
Silver medal – second place	1988 Seoul	25 m rapid fire pistol
World Championships
Gold medal – first place	1990 Moscow	25 m rapid fire pistol
Gold medal – first place	1998 Barcelona	25 m rapid fire pistol
Gold medal – first place	1998 Barcelona	25 m rapid fire pistol team
Gold medal – first place	2002 Lahti	25 m rapid fire pistol team
Silver medal – second place	2002 Lahti	25 m rapid fire pistol
Bronze medal – third place	1986 Suhl	25 m rapid fire pistol
Bronze medal – third place	1994 Milan	25 m rapid fire pistol
World Cup Final
Gold medal – first place	1989 Munich	25 m rapid fire pistol
Gold medal – first place	1990 Munich	25 m rapid fire pistol
Gold medal – first place	1991 Munich	25 m rapid fire pistol
Gold medal – first place	1992 Munich	25 m rapid fire pistol
Gold medal – first place	1993 Munich	25 m rapid fire pistol
Gold medal – first place	1994 Munich	25 m rapid fire pistol
Gold medal – first place	1995 Munich	25 m rapid fire pistol
Gold medal – first place	1996 Lugano	25 m rapid fire pistol
Gold medal – first place	1999 Munich	25 m rapid fire pistol
Gold medal – first place	2000 Munich	25 m rapid fire pistol
Gold medal – first place	2002 Munich	25 m rapid fire pistol
Gold medal – first place	2004 Bangkok	25 m rapid fire pistol
Gold medal – first place	2007 Bangkok	25 m rapid fire pistol
Silver medal – second place	2003 Milan	25 m rapid fire pistol
Silver medal – second place	2006 Granada	25 m rapid fire pistol
Bronze medal – third place	1998 Zurich	25 m rapid fire pistol
Bronze medal – third place	2005 Munich	25 m rapid fire pistol
Bronze medal – third place	2008 Bangkok	25 m rapid fire pistol
European Championships
Gold medal – first place	1987 Lahti	25 m rapid fire pistol
Gold medal – first place	1989 Zagreb	25 m rapid fire pistol
Gold medal – first place	1991 Bologna	25 m rapid fire pistol
Gold medal – first place	1993 Brno	25 m rapid fire pistol
Gold medal – first place	1995 Zurich	25 m rapid fire pistol
Gold medal – first place	1999 Bordeaux	25 m rapid fire pistol
Gold medal – first place	2003 Plzen	25 m rapid fire pistol
Silver medal – second place	1985 Osijek	25 m rapid fire pistol
Silver medal – second place	2001 Zagreb	25 m rapid fire pistol
Bronze medal – third place	1997 Kouvola	25 m rapid fire pistol

Ralf Schumann (born 10 June 1962) is a former German 25 m rapid fire pistol shooter. He is a three-time Olympic Champion and twice the World Champion. One of the most decorated shooters of the modern era, he is the first of two sport shooters to have won three Olympic gold medals in one individual event (25 metre rapid fire pistol) and became the first of three sport shooters to have won three Olympic individual gold medals. He won the gold medals for the 25 metre rapid fire pistol event at the 1992, 1996 and 2004 Olympics and also won two silver medals at this event, becoming the most successful Olympic shooter at this event. Schumann participated in seven consecutive Olympic Games from 1988 to 2012, setting a new record for most Olympic appearances by a German athlete.

== Career ==
His international breakthrough came in the years before the Seoul Olympics in 1988, where he was considered the most likely winner. However, he was beaten by Afanasijs Kuzmins of the Soviet Union (later Latvia) by 598 to 597 in the qualification round, and could not close the gap in the finals as Kuzmins achieved a perfect 100. After this, the targets were changed, lowering results considerably, but Schumann's hegemony has only increased. He won the 1990 World Championships and the 1992 Olympics. He scored 596 points on several occasions before raising the World Record to 597 in 1995, which he equalled in 2000. After the major rule change in 2005, he beat the world record again with 588 points, bettered by Sergei Alifirenko later the same year. He also held the pre-2005 final World Record and the Olympic records (from 1996), excelling in the four-second final shooting.

Being the favourite in every competition he entered, it was natural that his failures to win received some attention. Most notable among these is his performance in the Sydney Olympics in 2000, when at the prospect of winning his third Olympic gold medal (something no RFP shooter before has managed) he only finished fifth. However, his results since then have proved that this was not the beginning of a long-term decline, and in the Athens Olympics in 2004, he finally won his third Olympic gold.

== Sponsorships ==
Ralf has worked as a precision mechanic during his shooting career, and his employers have sponsored his competitive shooting by offering Ralf a 3-month paid leave of absence each year to train. He also designed a custom .22 caliber pistol which is sold by Italian manufacturer Pardini.

== Personal life ==
Schumann was born in Meissen in Saxony. He took up pistol shooting in 1977 and was eventually trained at the East German national shooting arena in Suhl, Thuringia. He has on several occasions been voted the athlete of the year in Thuringia. He now lives in nearby Stockheim, Bavaria. His wife, Anke Völker-Schumann is also a shooter; she joined Ralf in competing at the 1988, 1996, and 2000 Olympics.

Olympic results
Event	1988	1992	1996	2000	2004	2008	2012
25 metre rapid fire pistol	(silver) Silver; 597+99	(gold) Gold; 594+195+96	(gold) Gold; 596+102.0	5th 584+99.3	(gold) Gold; 592+102.9	(silver) Silver; 579+200.5	16th 577

== See also ==
- List of multiple Olympic gold medalists in one event
- List of multiple Summer Olympic medalists
- List of athletes with the most appearances at Olympic Games
- World Cup Multi-Medalists
