= Petra Zublasing =

Italian sport shooter (born 1989)

Personal information
- Born: 30 June 1989 (age 37) Bolzano, Italy
- Height: 1.65 m (5 ft 5 in)
- Weight: 55 kg (121 lb)

Sport
- Sport: Sport shooting
Medal record
Women's shooting
Representing Italy
World Championships
Gold medal – first place	2014 Granada	10m air rifle
European Games
Gold medal – first place	2015 Baku	50m rifle 3 positions
Gold medal – first place	2015 Baku	10m air rifle (mixed team)

Petra Zublasing (born 30 June 1989) is an Italian sport shooter who won the 10 m air rifle event at the 2014 World Championships.

== Career ==
She first competed internationally in 2003, having begun sports shooting in 2001.

She competed in the Women's 10 metre air rifle and the women's 50 metre three positions events at the 2012 Summer Olympics. She won her first World Cup event in 2013 in Granada. In 2014, she won her greatest title to date, winning the women's 10 m air rifle event at the 2014 World Championships. To win, she beat the then reigning Olympic champion Yi Siling by 0.3 points with the last shot of the event. Earlier that year, she had set a new world record in the women's 50 m three positions event at the World Cup event in Fort Benning, having set the previous world record at the 2013 World Cup Final in Munich.

At the 2016 Olympics she competed in the same two events, reaching the final in the 50 m. She studied at West Virginia University.

Awards
Preceded by (Italy) Jessica Rossi	ISSF Shooter of the Year; 2014	Succeeded by (Croatia) Snježana Pejčić
