= Lan Xing =

Chinese rifle shooter (born 1990)

Lan Xing (Chinese: 兰兴; born 10 December 1990 in Sichuan) is a Chinese rifle shooter. He competed in the 50 m rifle three positions event at the 2012 Summer Olympics, where he placed 29th.
