= Denis Sokolov (sport shooter) =

Russian sport shooter

Personal information
- Born: March 19, 1983 (age 43) Irkutsk, Russia
- Height: 168 cm (5 ft 6 in)
- Weight: 60 kg (132 lb)

Sport
- Sport: Shooting
- Event: rifle
- Coached by: Viktor Sokolov, Eugeniy Krainov
Medal record
Representing Russia
European Shooting Championships
| Bronze medal – third place | Meraker 2010 | 10m air rifle |
| Gold medal – first place | Vierumaeki 2012 | 10m air rifle |
| Bronze medal – third place | Osijek 2013 | 50m rifle 3P team |

Denis Viktorovich Sokolov (Russian: Денис Викторович Соколов, born 19 March 1983) is a Russian rifle shooter. He placed 18th in the 50 m rifle three positions event at the 2012 Summer Olympics. Sokolov won the 10m air rifle event at the 2005 and 2010 World Cups and 2012 European Championships.

His younger brother Aleksandr and sister Liliya are also competitive sport shooters. They are all coached by their father Viktor.

== World record ==
Current world records held in 10 m Air Rifle
| Men | Qualification | 600 | Tevarit Majchacheep (THA); Denis Sokolov (RUS); Gagan Narang (IND); Gagan Narang (IND); Zhu Qinan (CHN) | January 27, 2000; March 1, 2008; May 5, 2008; May 16, 2008; September 22, 2011 | Langkawi (MAS); Winterthur (SUI); Bangkok (THA); New Delhi (IND); Wrocław (POL) |
