= Roman Bondaruk =

Ukrainian sport shooter

Personal information
- Full name: Roman Romanovych Bondaruk
- Nationality: Ukraine
- Born: 20 June 1974 (age 52) Lviv, Ukrainian SSR, Soviet Union
- Height: 1.78 m (5 ft 10 in)
- Weight: 90 kg (198 lb)

Sport
- Sport: Shooting
- Event: 25 m rapid fire pistol (RFP)
- Club: Dynamo Lviv
- Coached by: Stefan Tsivpka
Medal record
Men's shooting
Representing Ukraine
European Championships
Gold medal – first place	2013 Osijek	RFP
Silver medal – second place	2013 Osijek	STP
Silver medal – second place	2013 Osijek	CFP (team)
Bronze medal – third place	2013 Osijek	STP (team)
Bronze medal – third place	2015 Maribor	STP

Roman Romanovych Bondaruk (Ukrainian: Роман Романович Бондарук; born June 20, 1974) is a Ukrainian sport shooter.

== Career ==
Born in Lviv, he won two silver medals in rapid fire pistol at the 2006 ISSF World Cup series in Munich, Germany, and in Milan, Italy, accumulating scores of 780.2 and 780.9 points, respectively.

At the age of thirty-four, Bondaruk made his official debut for the 2008 Summer Olympics in Beijing, where he competed in the men's 25 m rapid fire pistol, along with his teammate Oleksandr Petriv. He finished only in sixth place by 1.9 points behind U.S. shooter Keith Sanderson, with a total score of 774.7 targets (580 in the preliminary rounds and 194.7 in the final).

At the 2012 Summer Olympics in London, Bondaruk hit a total of 579 targets (284 on the first stage and 295 on the second) in the preliminary rounds of the men's 25 m rapid fire pistol, finishing in twelfth place, and not qualifying for the final.
