= Marcel Bürge =

Swiss sports shooter

Medal record

Men's shooting

Representing Switzerland

European Shooting Championships
Gold medal – first place	Osijek 2013	300 m st rifle team
Silver medal – second place	Osijek 2013	300 m standard rifle
Silver medal – second place	Osijek 2013	300 m rifle prone
Silver medal – second place	Osijek 2013	300 m rifle 3 pos team
Bronze medal – third place	Osijek 2013	300 m rifle 3 positions

Marcel Bürge (born 28 March 1972 in Arbon) is a Swiss rifle shooter. He competed at the 2012 Summer Olympics, where he placed 14th in the 50 m rifle prone event and 11th in the 50 m rifle three positions event.
