= Giuseppe Giordano =

Italian sport shooter (born 1974)

Personal information
- Nationality: Italy
- Born: 16 July 1974 (age 52) Naples, Italy
- Height: 1.70 m (5 ft 7 in)
- Weight: 74 kg (163 lb)

Sport
- Sport: Shooting
- Events: 10 m air pistol (AP60); 50 m pistol (FP)
- Club: Centro Sportivo Esercito
- Coached by: Marco Masetti
Medal record
Men's shooting
Representing Italy
European Championships
Gold medal – first place	2013 Osijek	50 m pistol
Gold medal – first place	2013 Osijek	50 m pistol team
Gold medal – first place	2019 Osijek	10 m air pistol team
Silver medal – second place	2020 Wrocław	10 m air pistol team
Silver medal – second place	2021 Osijek	10 m air pistol team
Bronze medal – third place	2019 Osijek	10 m air pistol

Giuseppe Giordano (born July 16, 1974, in Naples) is an Italian sport shooter. He won a bronze medal in the men's free pistol at the 2011 ISSF World Cup series in Munich, Germany, with a total score of 659.6 points, earning him a spot on the Italian team for the Olympics. Giordano is also a member of the shooting team for Centro Sportivo Esercito, and is coached and trained by Marco Masetti.

Giordano represented Italy at the 2012 Summer Olympics in London, where he competed in the men's 50 m pistol, along with his teammate and three-time Olympian Francesco Bruno. Giordano barely advanced to the final, after scoring a total of 559 targets from the qualifying rounds, and winning a shoot-off by one-tenth of a point ahead of Portugal's João Costa, with a bonus of 49.6. He finished in fifth place by six points behind winner and defending Olympic champion Jin Jong-Oh of South Korea (662.0), accumulating a score of 656.0 targets (97.0 in the final).
