= Yury Shcherbatsevich =

Belarusian sport shooter (born 1984)

Personal information
- Nationality: Belarusian
- Born: 11 July 1984 (age 41) Chervyen, Belarus
- Height: 1.78 m (5 ft 10 in)
- Weight: 87 kg (192 lb)

Sport
- Country: Belarus
- Sport: Shooting
- Event: Air rifle
- Club: Army
Medal record
Men's shooting
Representing Belarus
World Championships
| Bronze medal – third place | 2018 Changwon | 50 m team rifle 3 positions |
European Shooting Championships
| Silver medal – second place | Osijek 2013 | 50 m rifle prone team |
| Bronze medal – third place | Osijek 2013 | 50 m rifle 3P team |

Yury Shcherbatsevich (Belarusian: Юрый Шчарбацэвіч; born 11 July 1984) is a Belarusian rifle shooter. He competed at the 2012 Summer Olympics, where he placed 30th in the 50 m rifle prone event and 8th in the 50 m rifle three positions event.
