= Anzela Voronova =

Estonian sports shooter (born 1968)

Personal information
- Born: 4 October 1968 (age 57) Narva, then part of Estonian SSR, Soviet Union

Sport
- Sport: Sports shooting
Medal record
Women's shooting
Representing Estonia
European Championships
Gold medal – first place	2013 Osijek	300m Rifle 3 Positions
Bronze medal – third place	2013 Osijek	300m Rifle Prone Team
Bronze medal – third place	2015 Maribor	300m Rifle Prone Team
Bronze medal – third place	2015 Maribor	300m Rifle 3 Positions Team
Bronze medal – third place	2017 Baku	300m Rifle Prone Team
Bronze medal – third place	2025 Châteauroux	300 m Rifle Prone Team
Baltic States Cup
Silver medal – second place	2021 Rokiškis	50 m Rifle Prone
Silver medal – second place	2021 Rokiškis	50 m Rifle 3 Positions

Anzela Voronova (born 4 October 1968) is an Estonian sports shooter. She competed in the Women's 10 metre air rifle event at the 2012 Summer Olympics, finishing in 42nd place. She also competed in the women's 50 metre rifle 3 positions competition, finishing in 31st.
