= Daniel Brodmeier =

German rifle shooter (born 1987)

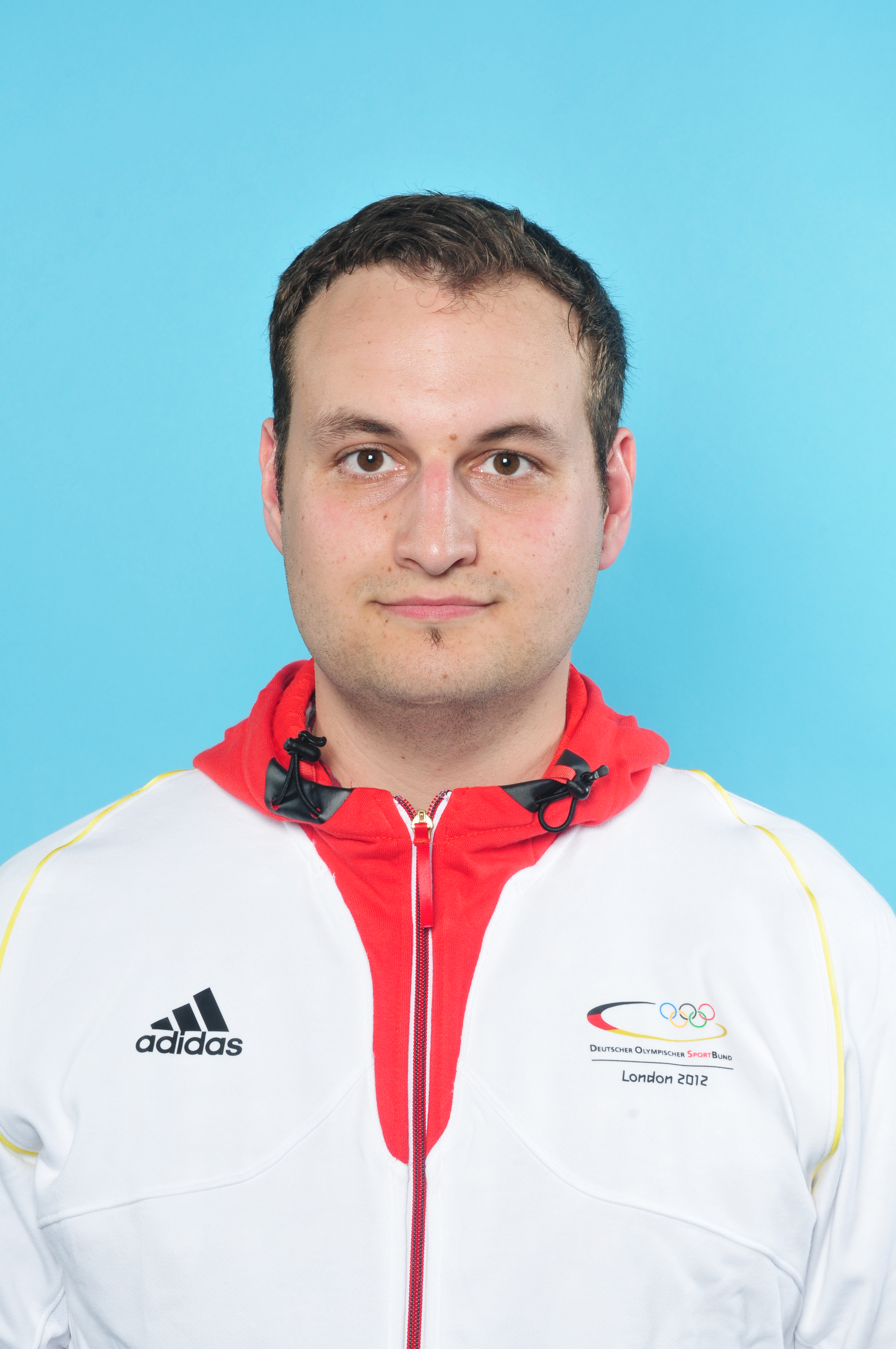

Personal information
- Nickname: Brodi
- Nationality: German
- Born: 2 September 1987 (age 38) Kelheim, West Germany
- Height: 1.79 m (5 ft 10 in)
- Weight: 98 kg (216 lb)

Sport
- Country: Germany
- Sport: Shooting
- Event: Rifle
- Club: 1882 Saal
Medal record
World Championships
| Gold medal – first place | 2018 Changwon | 50 m team rifle prone |

Daniel Brodmeier (born 2 September 1987) is a German rifle shooter. He competed at the 2012 Summer Olympics, where he placed 5th in the 50 m rifle prone event and 32nd in the 50 m rifle three positions event. At the 2016 Summer Olympics, he placed 4th in the 50 m rifle three positions event and 37th in the 50 m rifle prone event.
