= Jorge Llames =

Spanish pistol shooter (born 1978)

Personal information
- Full name: Jorge León Llames Gutiérrez
- Nationality: Spain
- Born: 17 October 1978 (age 47) Piedras Blancas, Asturias, Spain
- Height: 1.70 m (5 ft 7 in)
- Weight: 76 kg (168 lb)

Sport
- Sport: Shooting
- Event: 25 m rapid fire pistol (RFP)
- Club: Club Ensidesa Trasona
- Coached by: Cezary Staniszewski

Jorge León Llames Gutiérrez (Note: In this Spanish name, the first or paternal surname is Llames and the second or maternal family name is Gutiérrez.) (born 17 October 1978 in Piedras Blancas, Asturias), known as Jorge Llames, is a Spanish sport shooter. He won a bronze medal in the men's rapid fire pistol at the 2011 ISSF World Cup series in Changwon, South Korea, with a total score of 580 points and a bonus of 20 from the final, earning him a spot on the Spanish team for the Olympics. Llames is also a member of Club Ensidesa Trasona in Asturias, and is coached and trained by Cezary Staniszewski.

Llames represented Spain at the 2012 Summer Olympics in London, where he competed in the men's 25 m rapid fire pistol. Llames scored a total of 579 targets (288 on the first stage and 291 on the second) in the qualifying rounds by two inner tens behind South Korea's Kim Dae-Yoong, finishing in eleventh place.
