= Stian Bogar =

Norwegian sport shooter

Personal information
- Nationality: Norwegian
- Born: 10 November 1976 (age 49) Drammen, Norway
- Height: 1.70 m (5 ft 7 in)
- Weight: 78 kg (172 lb)

Sport
- Country: Norway
- Sport: Shooting
- Event: Air rifle
- Club: Kisen MSL
Medal record
World Championships
Silver medal – second place	2018 Changwon	50 m rifle prone
Bronze medal – third place	Changwon	300 m team rifle prone

Stian Bogar (born 10 November 1976) is a Norwegian sport shooter.

He participated at the 2018 ISSF World Shooting Championships, winning a medal.
