= Malin Westerheim =

Norwegian sports shooter (born 1993)

Personal information
- Born: 9 November 1993 (age 32) Fredrikstad, Norway

Sport
- Sport: Sports shooting
Medal record
Women's shooting
Representing Norway
European Shooting Championships
Gold medal – first place	Osijek 2013	50 m rifle 3 positions
Silver medal – second place	Osijek 2013	50 m rifle prone

Malin Westerheim (born 10 November 1993) is a Norwegian sports shooter. She competed in the Women's 10 metre air rifle event at the 2012 Summer Olympics.
