= Denis Kulakov (sport shooter) =

Russian sport shooter

Personal information
- Full name: Denis Aleksandrovich Kulakov
- Nationality: Russian
- Born: 21 January 1982 (age 44) Chelyabinsk, Russia
- Height: 1.72 m (5 ft 8 in)
- Weight: 82 kg (181 lb)

Sport
- Country: Russia
- Sport: Shooting
- Event: Air pistol
- Club: DOSAAF
Medal record
Men's shooting
Representing Russia
World Championships
Bronze medal – third place	2018 Changwon	10 m team air pistol
European Shooting Championships
Gold medal – first place	Osijek 2013	25m SP team
Bronze medal – third place	Osijek 2013	50m pistol
Bronze medal – third place	Osijek 2013	50m pistol team

Denis Aleksandrovich Kulakov (Russian: Денис Александрович Кулаков; born 21 November 1982) is a Russian sport shooter who competes in the men's 10 metre air pistol. At the 2012 Summer Olympics, he finished 26th in the qualifying round, failing to make the cut for the final.
