= Cyril Graff =

French sport shooter (born 1980)

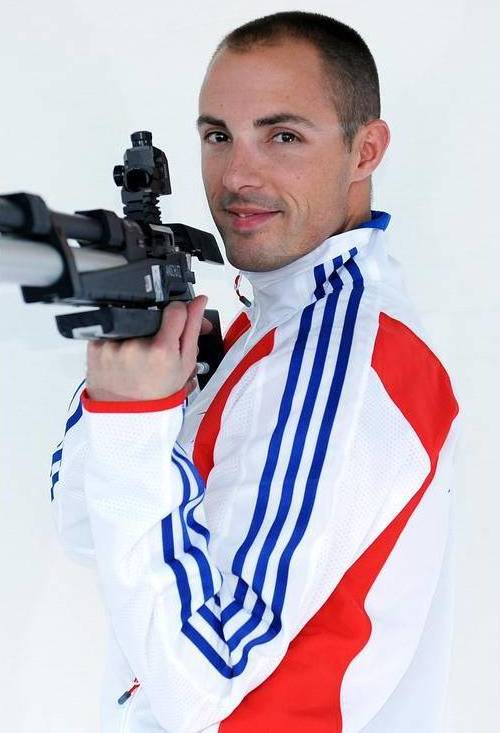
- Graff in 2012

Personal information
- Nickname: Cyssou
- Born: 11 September 1980 (age 46) Nancy, France
- Height: 170 cm (5 ft 7 in)
- Weight: 64 kg (141 lb)
Medal record
Men's shooting
Representing France
European Shooting Championships
Gold medal – first place	Osijek 2013	300 m rifle 3 positions
Gold medal – first place	Osijek 2013	50 m rifle prone team
Gold medal – first place	Osijek 2013	50 m rifle 3 positions team
Gold medal – first place	Osijek 2013	300 m rifle prone team
Gold medal – first place	Osijek 2013	300 m rifle 3 pos team

Cyril Graff (born 11 September 1980) is a French sport shooter. He was born in Nancy. He competed at the 2012 Summer Olympics in London, where he placed fourth in 50 metre rifle three positions. He also came 46th in the 50 metre rifle prone event.
