= Andreas Löw =

German sport shooter (born 1982)

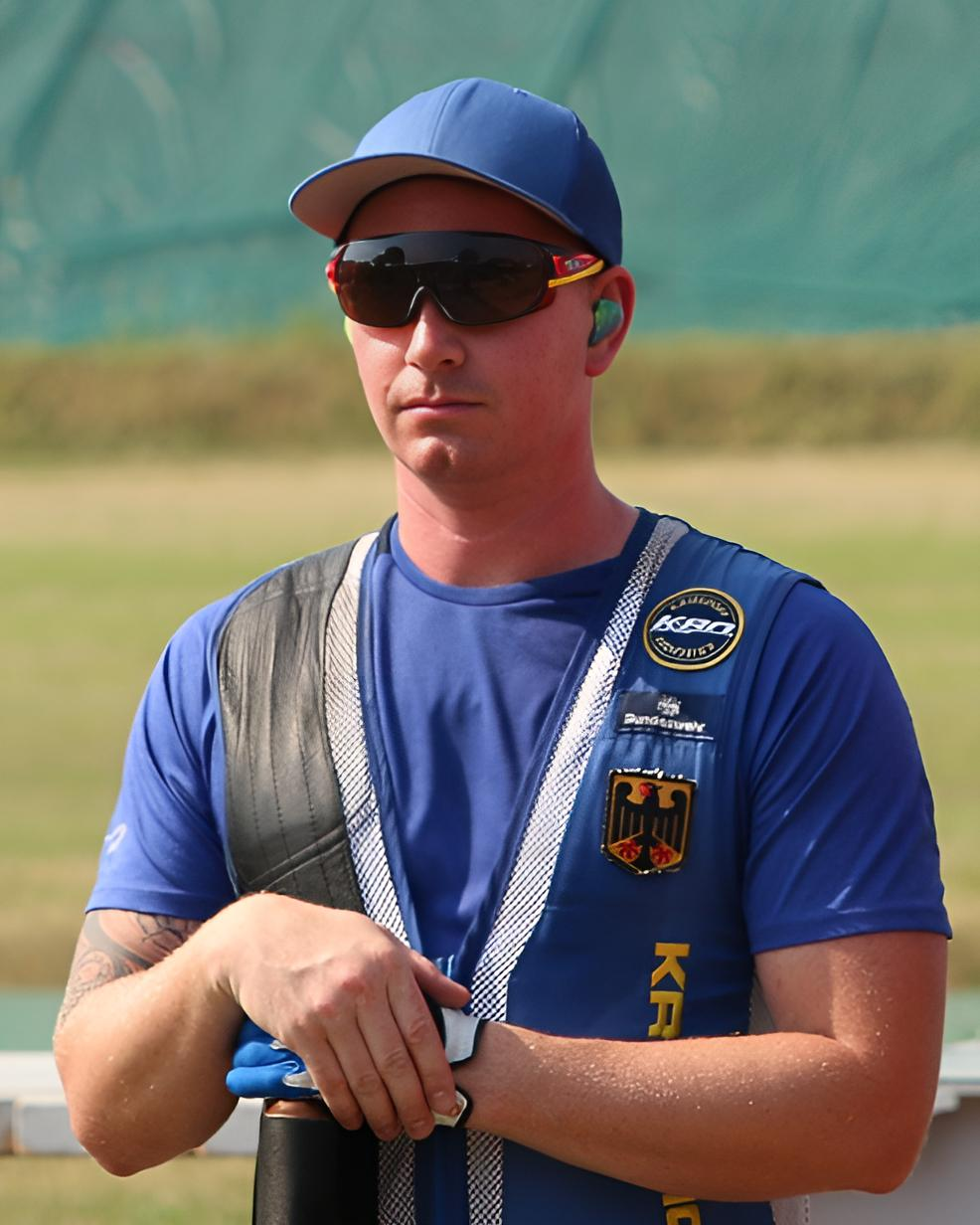

Personal information
- Nationality: German
- Born: 19 January 1982 (age 43); Neuendettelsau, West Germany
- Height: 1.77 m (5 ft 10 in)
- Weight: 81 kg (179 lb)

Sport
- Country: Germany
- Sport: Shooting

Andreas Löw (also spelled Loew; born 19 January 1982) is a German shooter. He represented his country at the 2016 Summer Olympics in men's double trap. In the qualification round, he set a new Olympic record. During the semifinals, he finished in 6th place and did not advance to the finals.
