= Gernot Rumpler =

Austrian sports shooter (born 1994)

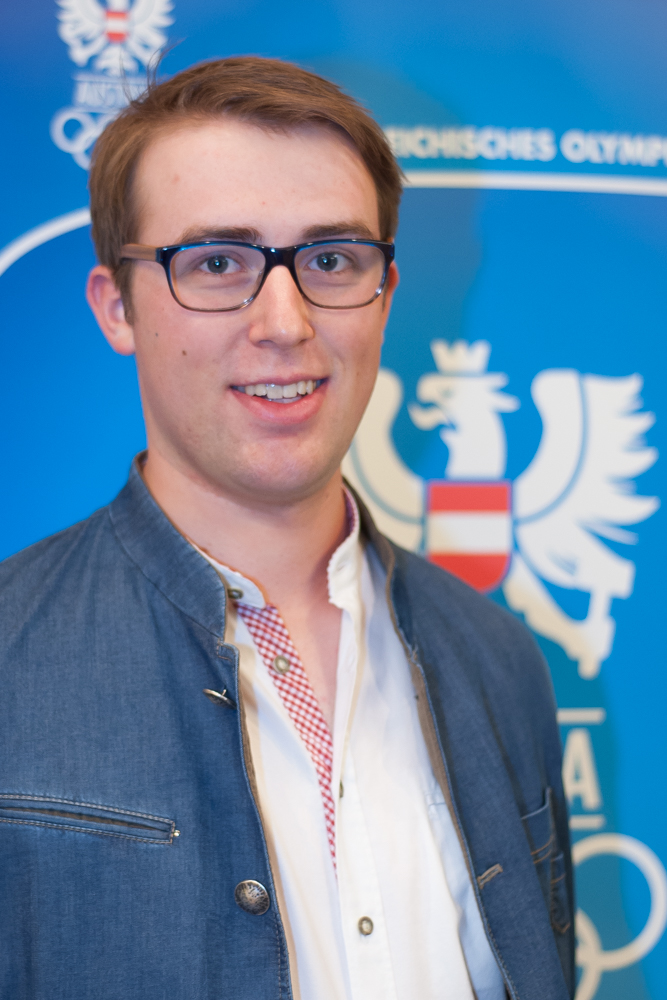
- Rumpler in 2016

Personal information
- Nationality: Austrian
- Born: 21 February 1994 (age 32) Mittersill, Austria
- Height: 1.89 m (6 ft 2 in)
- Weight: 89 kg (196 lb)

Sport
- Country: Austria
- Sport: Sports shooting
- Event: Air rifle
- Club: priv kvk Schützenverein Mittersill
Medal record
World Championships
Gold medal – first place	2018 Changwon	300 m team rifle 3 positions
European Championships
Silver medal – second place	2021 Osijek	50 m rifle 3 positions mixed team

Gernot Rumpler (born 21 February 1994) is an Austrian sports shooter. He competed in the men's 10 metre air rifle event at the 2016 Summer Olympics. At the 2018 World Championships he was part of the Austrian team that won the 300m rifle three position event alongside Bernhard Pickl and Stefan Rumpler.

At the 2021 European Championships he won silver in the 50m rifle three-position mixed team with Sheileen Waibel.
