= Jana Beckmann =

German sport shooter

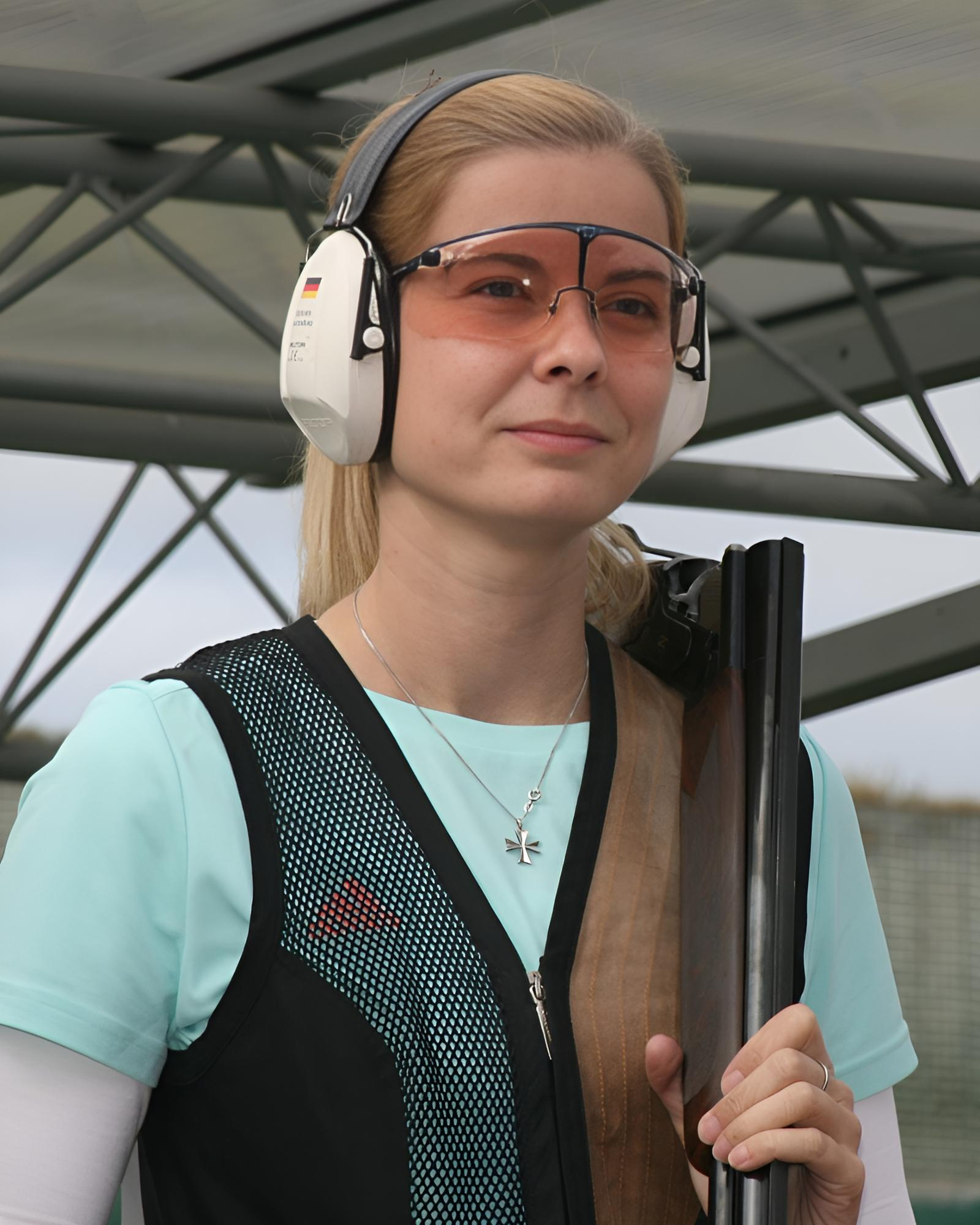

Personal information
- Nationality: German
- Born: 2 May 1983 (age 41); Magdeburg, Saxony-Anhalt, Germany
- Height: 1.70 m (5 ft 7 in)
- Weight: 60 kg (132 lb)

Sport
- Country: Germany
- Sport: Shooting

Jana Beckmann (born 2 May 1983) is a German shooter. She represented her country at the 2016 Summer Olympics in women's trap. She finished 19th in the qualification round and did not advance to the semifinals.
