= Anna Mastyanina =

Russian sport shooter (born 1987)

Personal information
- Full name: Anna Aleksandrovna Mastyanina
- Nationality: Russia
- Born: 28 December 1987 (age 38) Samara, Russian SFSR
- Height: 1.70 m (5 ft 7 in)
- Weight: 68 kg (150 lb)

Sport
- Sport: Shooting
- Events: 10 m air pistol (AP40); 25 m pistol (SP)
- Club: Armiya Sport Club
- Coached by: Aleksandr Suslov

Anna Aleksandrovna Mastyanina (Russian: Анна Александровна Мастянина; born 28 December 1987) is a Russian sport shooter. She won a silver medal in the women's sport pistol at the 2010 ISSF World Cup series in Sydney, Australia, with a total score of 781.2 points, earning her a spot on the Russian team for the 2012 Olympics. Mastyanina isa member of the shooting team for Armiya Sports Club, and is coached and trained by Aleksandr Suslov.

Mastyanina represented Russia at the 2012 Summer Olympics in London, where she competed in the women's 25 m pistol, along with her teammate Kira Mozgalova. Mastyanina shot 286 targets in the precision stage, and 292 in the rapid-fire, for a total score of 578 points and a bonus of 20 inner tens, finishing in twenty-fourth place.
