= Ivan Bidnyak =

Ukrainian shooter and soldier (1985–2022)

Ivan Oleksandrovych Bidnyak (Ukrainian: Іван Олександрович Бідняк; October 1, 1985, Marhanets, Dnipropetrovsk Oblast, Ukrainian SSR, USSR — April 20, 2022, Kherson Oblast, Ukraine), was a Ukrainian sports shooter, master of sports of international class of Ukraine in bullseye shooting, and a senior soldier of the Armed Forces of Ukraine. He took part in the Russo-Ukrainian War, and died during the Russian invasion of Ukraine.

== Biography ==
In 2003, he graduated from the Lviv State School of Physical Culture (shooting department) and returned to Dnipropetrovsk. At the 2005 European Championships in Belgrade, he won a gold medal in the 25m Junior pistol competition. In the same year in Tallinn at the European Championships, he won a silver medal in the 10m Air pistol competition.

He took second place in shooting with a small-caliber pistol (MP-6 exercise) at the 26th ISAS international tournament, Dortmund, with a score of 657.0 points.

In March 2010, he won a silver medal as part of the team at the European shooting championship in the city of Meraker (Norway) — shooting with an air pistol at 10 meters (exercise PP-3) — together with Serhiy Kudreya (Kherson) and Oleg Omelchuk (Rivne)

In 2010, he was recognized as the eighth in the top ten sportsmen of the Dnipropetrovsk region (3 bronze medals in the European shooting Championship).

At the 2010 ISSF World Shooting Championships, his 7th-place finish in the 10 meter air pistol earned Ukraine's first shooting quota place to the 2012 Olympic Games.

In the summer of 2013, he won a silver medal at the European Small Arms Shooting Championship in Osijek — from a distance of 25 meters, with a result of 575 points. In the team tournament, Roman Bondaruk together with Oleksandr Petriv and Ivan Bidniak won bronze awards — scoring 1706 points.

In February 2022, at the beginning of the Russian invasion of Ukraine, he returned from abroad, where he worked, and went to the front as a volunteer. He fought in Kherson Oblast. On April 20, 2022, he was killed by an enemy bullet during a combat mission.

Prior to the 2024 Summer Olympics, Bitnyak was one of the 450 Ukrainian athletes honoured with a minute's silence in a demonstration by the Association of Ukrainians in France and World Congress of Ukrainians.

== Awards ==
- Order "For Courage" III degree (2022) — for personal courage and selfless actions shown in the defense of the state sovereignty and territorial integrity of Ukraine, loyalty to the military oath.

== See also ==
- List of Ukrainian sports figures killed during the Russo-Ukrainian war

== Sources ==
- UNIAN
- Lviv State School of Physical Culture
- Bullet Shooting
- The first Ukrainian license for the 2012 Olympics
- VRU
- Shooting Federation of Ukraine
