= Fedor Vlasov =

Russian sports shooter

Personal information
- Born: 28 March 1984 (age 42)
- Height: 1.75 m (5 ft 9 in)
- Weight: 59 kg (130 lb)

Sport
- Sport: Sports shooting

Fedor Vlasov (born 28 March 1984) is a Russian sports shooter. He competed in the men's 50 metre rifle three positions event at the 2016 Summer Olympics. Vladimir Putin congratulated him on his success at the Summer Olympics.
