= Francesco Bruno (sport shooter) =

Italian sport shooter

Medal record

Men's Shooting

Representing Italy

European Shooting Championships
Gold medal – first place	Osijek 2013	50m pistol team

Mediterranean Games
Gold medal – first place	2005 Almería	10 m air pistol

Francesco Bruno (born 15 June 1978) is an Italian sport shooter. He won a gold medal at the 2005 Mediterranean Games, and competed in three consecutive Summer Olympics for his native country, starting in 2004. He was born in Foggia.

He shoots with the Benelli Kite air pistol.

Olympic results
Event	2004	2008	2012
50 metre pistol	12th 556	18th 554	24th 553
10 metre air pistol	17th 578	—	29th 574
