= Lessia Leskiv =

Ukrainian sport shooter (born 1963)

Personal information
- Full name: Lesia Severynivna Leskiv
- Nationality: Ukraine
- Born: 17 October 1963 (age 63) Rohatyn, Ukrainian SSR, Soviet Union
- Height: 1.73 m (5 ft 8 in)
- Weight: 63 kg (139 lb)

Sport
- Sport: Shooting
- Events: 10 m air rifle (AR40); 50 m rifle 3 positions (STR3X20); 300 m rifle 3 positions (300STR3X20)
- Club: Club Lvov Army Forces
- Coached by: Vyacheslav Vysochyn
Medal record
Women's shooting
World Championships
Representing Ukraine
Silver medal – second place	1994 Milan	STR3X20
Representing the Soviet Union
Silver medal – second place	1982 Caracas	STR3X20
Silver medal – second place	1982 Caracas	AR40
European Championships
Representing Ukraine
Gold medal – first place	1993 Brno	STR60PR
Gold medal – first place	2017 Baku	50m rifle prone team
Bronze medal – third place	1995 Bordeaux	STR60PR
Bronze medal – third place	2013 Osijek	300STR3X20
Bronze medal – third place	2015 Maribor	300STR3X20
Representing the Soviet Union
Bronze medal – third place	1991 Bologna	STR60PR

Lesia Severynivna Leskiv (also Lessia Leskiv, Ukrainian: Леся Северинівна Леськів; born 17 October 1963 in Rohatyn) is a Ukrainian sport shooter. She represented Ukraine in rifle shooting in the Olympic Games in 1996, 2000, and 2004, finishing within the top fifteen in the games. Leskiv also earned four medals (three silvers and one bronze) at the World Championships, and five more, including three golds, at the European Championships, bringing them up to her remarkable career tally of nine. A full-fledged member of the Lvov Army Forces, Leskiv trained for the shooting club under her personal coach Vadym Vysochyn.

Leskiv started out as a member of the Soviet shooting squad at the 1984 Friendship Games in Moscow, where she took home the silver medal in the rifle three positions. Although she missed out a chance to compete in two succeeding editions of the Olympic Games, Leskiv managed to successfully claim four medals, three silvers and one bronze, in rifle shooting at the ISSF World Shooting Championships between 1982 and 1994.

Following Ukraine's official debut at the 1996 Summer Olympics in Atlanta as an independent nation, Leskiv was selected to compete for the nation's Olympic shooting squad. She wound up an eighth spot in the 10 m air rifle, and then shared a ninth position with Switzerland's Gaby Bühlmann and Germany's Petra Horneber in the 50 m rifle 3 positions, accumulating a tally of 494.2 and 579 points, respectively.

At the 2000 Summer Olympics in Sydney, Leskiv dropped her position from the previous Games to fifteenth with a score of 392 points in the 10 m air rifle. She redeemed herself with a score of 579 in the prelims to share the ninth spot with Norway's Lindy Hansen in the 50 m rifle 3 positions, but fell short of a chance to compete for the final by a single point.

Eight years after competing in her first Olympics, Leskiv qualified for her third Ukrainian team, as a 40-year-old, in rifle shooting at the 2004 Summer Olympics in Athens by finishing seventh and having achieved a minimum score of 398 in the 10 m air rifle from the 2004 ISSF World Cup series. In the women's 10 m air rifle, Leskiv finished fourteenth in the prelims with a total score of 394, tying her position with five other shooters including her teammate Natallia Kalnysh. On her second event, the 50 m rifle 3 positions, Leskiv got off to a rough start in the prone with 192 points and then continued to drop rapidly into the bottom of the field by a two-point deficit in the standing position with 190. Ending towards the kneeling series smoothly with a satisfying shot of 193, Leskiv collected a total of 575 points to share a thirteenth spot with Bühlmann and India's Anjali Bhagwat in the prelims, but failed to advance further into the final round by a four-point deficit.

== Olympic results ==
Event	1996	2000	2004
50 metre rifle three positions	9th 579	9th 579	13th 575
10 metre air rifle	8th 394+100.2	15th 392	14th 394
