= Oleksandr Petriv =

Ukrainian sport shooter (born 1974)

Personal information
- Nationality: Ukrainian
- Born: 5 July 1974 (age 51) Lviv, Ukrainian SSR, Soviet Union
- Height: 1.74 m (5 ft 9 in)
- Weight: 72 kg (159 lb)

Sport
- Country: Ukraine
- Sport: Shooting
- Event: Air pistol
- Club: Sport Club of Army, L'viv
Medal record
Men's shooting
Representing Ukraine
Olympic Games
Gold medal – first place	2008 Beijing	25 m rapid fire pistol
World Championships
Gold medal – first place	2014 Granada	25 m center fire pistol team
Gold medal – first place	2014 Granada	25 m standard pistol team
Silver medal – second place	2014 Granada	25 m center fire pistol
Bronze medal – third place	2002 Lahti	25 m center fire pistol team
Bronze medal – third place	2006 Zagreb	25 m team standard pistol team
Bronze medal – third place	2018 Changwon	25 m team standard pistol
European Championships
Gold medal – first place	2021 Osijek	25 m rapid fire pistol mixed team
Silver medal – second place	2013 Osijek	25 m cf pistol team
Bronze medal – third place	2013 Osijek	25 m st pistol team
Military Games
Bronze medal – third place	2019 Wuhan	25 m center fire pistol team

Oleksandr Petriv (Ukrainian: Олександр Петрів; born 5 August 1974) is a Ukrainian Olympic shooter. He won a gold medal in the Men's 25 metre rapid fire pistol event at the 2008 Summer Olympics in Beijing.
