= Nazar Louginets =

Russian sport shooter (born 1989)

Personal information
- Nationality: Russian
- Born: 31 May 1989 (age 37) Novorossiysk, Russia
- Height: 1.81 m (5 ft 11 in)
- Weight: 70 kg (154 lb)

Sport
- Country: Russia
- Sport: Shooting
- Event: Air rifle
Medal record
World Championships
Gold medal – first place	2018 Changwon	50 m team rifle 3 positions

Nazar Louginets (born 31 May 1989) is a Russian sport shooter.

He participated at the 2018 ISSF World Shooting Championships, winning a medal.
