= Beate Gauß =

German sports shooter (born 1984)

Beate Köstel
Personal information
- Born: Beate Gauß; 10 August 1984 (age 41) Tübingen, West Germany

Sport
- Country: Germany
- Sport: Sports shooting
Medal record
European Championships
Silver medal – second place	2017 Baku	50m rifle prone team

Beate Köstel (née Gauß, born 10 August 1984) is a German sports shooter. She competed in the Women's 10 metre air rifle event at the 2012 Summer Olympics.
