= Marina Schnider =

Swiss sport shooter

Personal information
- Nationality: Swiss
- Born: 11 July 1986 (age 39) Grabs, Switzerland
- Height: 1.55 m (5 ft 1 in)
- Weight: 52 kg (115 lb)

Sport
- Country: Switzerland
- Sport: Shooting
- Event: Air rifle
- Club: Schuetzenverein Buchs-Raefis
Medal record
World Championships
Bronze medal – third place	2018 Changwon	300 m team rifle prone
Bronze medal – third place	2018 Changwon	300 m team rifle 3 positions

Marina Schnider (born 11 July 1986) is a Swiss sport shooter.

She participated at the 2018 ISSF World Shooting Championships, winning a medal.
