= Amelie Kleinmanns =

German sport shooter (born 1988)

Personal information
- Nationality: German
- Born: 30 August 1988 (age 37) Tönisvorst, Germany
- Height: 1.68 m (5 ft 6 in)

Sport
- Country: Germany
- Sport: Shooting
- Event: Air rifle
- Club: SC Tell Schmallbroich
Medal record
World Championships
Gold medal – first place	2018 Changwon	50 m team rifle prone

Amelie Kleinmanns (born 30 August 1988) is a German sport shooter.

She participated at the 2018 ISSF World Shooting Championships, winning a medal.
