= Ole-Kristian Bryhn =

Norwegian sport shooter (born 1989)

Personal information
- Nationality: Norwegian
- Born: 1 May 1989 (age 37) Drammen, Norway
- Height: 1.89 m (6 ft 2 in)
- Weight: 87 kg (192 lb)

Sport
- Country: Norway
- Sport: Shooting
- Event: Air rifle
- Club: VBS
Medal record
Men's shooting
Representing Norway
World Championships
Gold medal – first place	2018 Changwon	300 m team standard rifle
Bronze medal – third place	2018 Changwon	300 m team rifle prone
European Championships
Silver medal – second place	Osijek 2013	300 m st rifle team
Bronze medal – third place	Osijek 2013	300 m rifle 3 pos team

Ole-Kristian Bryhn (born 1 May 1989) is a Norwegian sport shooter.

== Career ==
He qualified for the 2012 Summer Olympics in London in the 50 m rifle 3 positions, finishing in 7th place.

At the 2016 Summer Olympics in Rio de Janeiro, he competed in 10 metre air rifle, 50 metre rifle prone, and 50 m rifle 3 positions events. In the 10 m air rifle competition, he finished in 40th place in the qualification round and did not qualify for the finals. In the 50 m rifle prone competition, he finished 43rd in the qualification round and did not qualify for the final. In the 50 m rifle 3 positions competition, he finished 3rd in the qualification round and advanced to the finals where he finished in 8th place. He was the flagbearer for Norway during the Parade of Nations.

Olympic Games
Preceded by Mira Verås Larsen	Flagbearer for Norway; Rio de Janeiro 2016	Succeeded by Tomoe Zenimoto Hvas & Anne Vilde Tuxen
