= Vitali Bubnovich =

Belarusian sports shooter (born 1974)

Personal information
- Nationality: Belarusian
- Born: 12 November 1974 (age 51) Grodno, Byelorussian SSR, Soviet Union
- Height: 1.69 m (5 ft 7 in)
- Weight: 67 kg (148 lb)

Sport
- Country: Belarus
- Sport: Sports shooting
- Event: Air rifle
- Club: Military Sport Club
Medal record
Men's shooting
Representing Belarus
World Championships
| Bronze medal – third place | 2018 Changwon | 50 m team rifle 3 positions |
European Shooting Championships
| Silver medal – second place | Osijek 2013 | 50 m rifle prone team |
| Bronze medal – third place | Osijek 2013 | 50 m rifle 3 positions |
| Bronze medal – third place | Osijek 2013 | 50 m rifle 3P team |

Vitali Bubnovich (born 12 November 1974) is a Belarusian sports shooter. He competed at the 2004, 2008 and 2012 Summer Olympics.
