= Alexei Klimov =

Russian sport shooter (born 1975)

Medal record

Men's shooting

Representing Russia

European Games
Silver medal – second place	2015 Baku	25 m rapid fire pistol

European Shooting Championships
Silver medal – second place	Osijek 2013	25 m rapid fire pistol
Silver medal – second place	Osijek 2013	25 m RF pistol team

Military World Games
Silver medal – second place	2019 Wuhan	25 m rapid fire pistol team

Alexey Vasilyevich Klimov (Russian: Алексей Васильевич Климов; born 27 August 1975 in Tomsk) is a Russian sport shooter. He set a world record at the 2006 World Cup in the 25 metre rapid fire pistol, the event in which he specializes.

He has competed at two Olympics, finishing 8th in 2008, and 4th in 2012.
