= 2002 ISSF World Cup =

For the 2002 ISSF World Cup in the seventeen Olympic shooting events, the World Cup Final was held in August 2002 in Munich, Germany for the rifle, pistol and running target events, and in October 2002 in Lonato, Italy for the shotgun events.

== Rifle, pistol and running target ==
=== Men's individual ===
10m Air Rifle
Stage	Venue	1st place, gold medalist(s)	2nd place, silver medalist(s)	3rd place, bronze medalist(s)
1	(Australia) Sydney	Kim Byung-eun (KOR)	Konstantin Prikhodtchenko (RUS)	Jozef Gönci (SVK)
2	(China) Shanghai	Zhang Fu (CHN)	Péter Sidi (HUN)	Mario Knögler (AUT)
3	(United States) Atlanta	Jason Parker (USA)	Péter Sidi (HUN)	Maik Eckhardt (GER)
4	(Italy) Milan	Peter Thuesen (DEN)	Rajmond Debevec (SLO)	Tevarit Majchacheep (THA)
Final	(Germany) Munich	Li Jie (CHN)	Zhang Fu (CHN)	Jozef Gönci (SVK)

50m Rifle 3 Positions
Stage	Venue	1st place, gold medalist(s)	2nd place, silver medalist(s)	3rd place, bronze medalist(s)
1	(Australia) Sydney	Konstantin Prikhodtchenko (RUS)	Rajmond Debevec (SLO)	Tomáš Jeřábek (CZE)
2	(China) Shanghai	Juha Hirvi (FIN)	Ge Hongzhuan (CHN)	Wang Weiyi (CHN)
3	(United States) Atlanta	Matthew Emmons (USA)	Marcel Bürge (SUI)	Maik Eckhardt (GER)
4	(Italy) Milan	Mario Knögler (AUT)	Rajmond Debevec (SLO)	Marcel Bürge (SUI)
Final	(Germany) Munich	Matthew Emmons (USA)	Artyom Khadjibekov (RUS)	Rajmond Debevec (SLO)

50m Rifle Prone
Stage	Venue	1st place, gold medalist(s)	2nd place, silver medalist(s)	3rd place, bronze medalist(s)
1	(Australia) Sydney	Mario Knögler (AUT)	Artur Ayvazyan (UKR)	Juha Hirvi (FIN)
2	(China) Shanghai	Anatoli Klimenko (BLR)	Guy Starik (ISR)	Mario Knögler (AUT)
3	(United States) Atlanta	Jonas Edman (SWE)	Harald Stenvaag (NOR)	Christian Lusch (GER)
4	(Italy) Milan	Michael Babb (GBR)	Mario Knögler (AUT)	Václav Bečvář (CZE)
Final	(Germany) Munich	Espen Berg-Knutsen (NOR)	Matthew Emmons (USA)	Artur Ayvazyan (UKR)

10m Air Pistol
Stage	Venue	1st place, gold medalist(s)	2nd place, silver medalist(s)	3rd place, bronze medalist(s)
1	(Australia) Sydney	Vladimir Isakov (RUS)	Franck Dumoulin (FRA)	Sorin Babii (ROU)
2	(China) Shanghai	Franck Dumoulin (FRA)	Tanyu Kiryakov (BUL)	Vladimir Gontcharov (RUS)
3	(United States) Atlanta	Tan Zongliang (CHN)	Franck Dumoulin (FRA)	Vladimir Gontcharov (RUS)
4	(Italy) Milan	Vigilio Fait (ITA)	Xu Dan (CHN)	João Costa (POR)
Final	(Germany) Munich	Mikhail Nestruyev (RUS)	Vladimir Gontcharov (RUS)	Tan Zongliang (CHN)

25m Rapid Fire Pistol
Stage	Venue	1st place, gold medalist(s)	2nd place, silver medalist(s)	3rd place, bronze medalist(s)
1	(Australia) Sydney	Emil Milev (BUL)	Iulian Raicea (ROU)	Sergei Alifirenko (RUS)
2	(China) Shanghai	Emil Milev (BUL)	Marco Spangenberg (GER)	Zhang Penghui (CHN)
3	(United States) Atlanta	Marco Spangenberg (GER)	Zhang Penghui (CHN)	Vladimir Vokhmyanin (KAZ)
4	(Italy) Milan	Liu Guohui (CHN)	Sergei Alifirenko (RUS)	Ralf Schumann (GER)
Final	(Germany) Munich	Ralf Schumann (GER)	Liu Guohui (CHN)	Marco Spangenberg (GER)

50m Pistol
Stage	Venue	1st place, gold medalist(s)	2nd place, silver medalist(s)	3rd place, bronze medalist(s)
1	(Australia) Sydney	Franck Dumoulin (FRA)	Sorin Babii (ROU)	Vladimir Isakov (RUS)
2	(China) Shanghai	Wang Yifu (CHN)	Franck Dumoulin (FRA)	Vladimir Gontcharov (RUS)
3	(United States) Atlanta	Martin Tenk (CZE)	Lou Xiangwu (CHN)	Franck Dumoulin (FRA)
4	(Italy) Milan	Xu Dan (CHN)	Yury Dauhapolau (BLR)	Igor Basinski (BLR)
Final	(Germany) Munich	Tan Zongliang (CHN)	Mikhail Nestruyev (RUS)	Vladimir Gontcharov (RUS)

10m Running Target
Stage	Venue	1st place, gold medalist(s)	2nd place, silver medalist(s)	3rd place, bronze medalist(s)
1	(Australia) Sydney	Miroslav Januš (CZE)	Dimitri Lykin (RUS)	Alexander Blinov (RUS)
2	(China) Shanghai	Manfred Kurzer (GER)	Igor Kolesov (RUS)	Zeng Guobin (CHN)
3	(United States) Atlanta	Dimitri Lykin (RUS)	Armando Ayala (USA)	Niklas Bergström (SWE)
4	(Czech Republic) Plzeň	Igor Kolesov (RUS)	Juri Ermolenko (RUS)	Oleksandr Zinenko (UKR)
Final	(Germany) Munich	Zeng Guobin (CHN)	Igor Kolesov (RUS)	Dimitri Lykin (RUS)

=== Women's individual ===
10m Air Rifle
Stage	Venue	1st place, gold medalist(s)	2nd place, silver medalist(s)	3rd place, bronze medalist(s)
1	(Australia) Sydney	Seo Sun-hwa (KOR)	Anjali Bhagwat (IND)	Kateřina Kůrková (CZE)
2	(China) Shanghai	Gao Jing (CHN)	Seo Sun-hwa (KOR)	Du Li (CHN)
3	(United States) Atlanta	Lyubov Galkina (RUS)	Anjali Bhagwat (IND)	Martina Prekel (GER)
4	(Italy) Milan	Sonja Pfeilschifter (GER)	Alexandra Schneider (GER)	Monika Haselsberger (AUT)
Final	(Germany) Munich	Lyubov Galkina (RUS)	Anjali Bhagwat (IND)	Gao Jing (CHN)

50m Rifle 3 Positions
Stage	Venue	1st place, gold medalist(s)	2nd place, silver medalist(s)	3rd place, bronze medalist(s)
1	(Australia) Sydney	Lyubov Galkina (RUS)	Gabriele Bühlmann (SUI)	Britta Grossecappenberg (GER)
2	(China) Shanghai	Shan Hong (CHN)	Wee Myung-joo (KOR)	Lessia Leskiv (UKR)
3	(United States) Atlanta	Wang Xian (CHN)	Lyubov Galkina (RUS)	Du Li (CHN)
4	(Italy) Milan	Sonja Pfeilschifter (GER)	Natallia Kalnysh (UKR)	Wang Chengyi (CHN)
Final	(Germany) Munich	Shan Hong (CHN)	Natallia Kalnysh (UKR)	Wang Xian (CHN)

10m Air Pistol
Stage	Venue	1st place, gold medalist(s)	2nd place, silver medalist(s)	3rd place, bronze medalist(s)
1	(Australia) Sydney	Olena Kostevych (UKR)	Marina Logvinenko (RUS)	Galina Belyayeva (RUS)
2	(China) Shanghai	Nino Salukvadze (GEO)	Olga Kuznetsova (RUS)	Tao Luna (CHN)
3	(United States) Atlanta	Tao Luna (CHN)	Maria Grozdeva (BUL)	Stéphanie Tirode (FRA)
4	(Italy) Milan	Munkhbayar Dorjsuren (MGL)	Miglena Todorova (BUL)	Olena Kostevych (UKR)
Final	(Germany) Munich	Tao Luna (CHN)	Olena Kostevych (UKR)	Ren Jie (CHN)

25m Pistol
Stage	Venue	1st place, gold medalist(s)	2nd place, silver medalist(s)	3rd place, bronze medalist(s)
1	(Australia) Sydney	Ren Jie (CHN)	Linda Ryan (AUS)	Li Duihong (CHN)
2	(China) Shanghai	Chen Ying (CHN)	Tao Luna (CHN)	Yuliya Alipova (BLR)
3	(United States) Atlanta	Tao Luna (CHN)	Chen Ying (CHN)	Maria Grozdeva (BUL)
4	(Italy) Milan	Chen Ying (CHN)	Maria Grozdeva (BUL)	Munkhbayar Dorjsuren (MGL)
Final	(Germany) Munich	Tao Luna (CHN)	Chen Ying (CHN)	Irada Ashumova (AZE)

== Shotgun ==
=== Men's individual ===
Trap
Stage	Venue	1st place, gold medalist(s)	2nd place, silver medalist(s)	3rd place, bronze medalist(s)
1	(Australia) Sydney	Michael Diamond (AUS)	Lance Bade (USA)	Adam Vella (AUS)
2	(China) Shanghai	Giovanni Pellielo (ITA)	Zhang Yongjie (CHN)	Karsten Bindrich (GER)
3	(Germany) Suhl	Aleksey Alipov (RUS)	Khaled Al-Mudhaf (KUW)	Rodolfo Viganò (ITA)
4	(Dominican Republic) Santo Domingo	Dominic Grazioli (USA)	Ian Peel (GBR)	David Kostelecký (CZE)
Final	(Italy) Lonato	Adam Vella (AUS)	Giovanni Pellielo (ITA)	Michael Diamond (AUS)

Double Trap
Stage	Venue	1st place, gold medalist(s)	2nd place, silver medalist(s)	3rd place, bronze medalist(s)
1	(Australia) Sydney	Daniele Di Spigno (ITA)	Fehaid Al-Deehani (KUW)	Hamad Alafasi (KUW)
2	(China) Shanghai	Waldemar Schanz (GER)	Li Shuangchun (CHN)	Vitaly Fokeev (RUS)
3	(Germany) Suhl	Walton Eller (USA)	Li Shuangchun (CHN)	Bill Keever (USA)
4	(Dominican Republic) Santo Domingo	Marco Innocenti (ITA)	Li Shuangchun (CHN)	Li Bo (CHN)
Final	(Italy) Lonato	Li Shuangchun (CHN)	Li Bo (CHN)	Daniele Di Spigno (ITA)

Skeet
Stage	Venue	1st place, gold medalist(s)	2nd place, silver medalist(s)	3rd place, bronze medalist(s)
1	(Australia) Sydney	Erik Watndal (NOR)	James Graves (USA)	Leoš Hlaváček (CZE)
2	(China) Shanghai	Hennie Dompeling (NED)	Shawn Dulohery (USA)	Jan-Henrik Heinrich (GER)
3	(Germany) Suhl	Ennio Falco (ITA)	Andrea Benelli (ITA)	Harald Jensen (NOR)
4	(Dominican Republic) Santo Domingo	James Graves (USA)	Leoš Hlaváček (CZE)	Marko Kemppainen (FIN)
Final	(Italy) Lonato	James Graves (USA)	Leoš Hlaváček (CZE)	Ennio Falco (ITA)

=== Women's individual ===
Trap
Stage	Venue	1st place, gold medalist(s)	2nd place, silver medalist(s)	3rd place, bronze medalist(s)
1	(Australia) Sydney	No event		
2	(China) Shanghai	Susanne Kiermayer (GER)	Gao E (CHN)	Amanda Dorman (USA)
3	(Germany) Suhl	Roberta Pelosi (ITA)	Gao E (CHN)	Taeko Takeba (JPN)
4	(Dominican Republic) Santo Domingo	No event		
Final	(Italy) Lonato	Gao E (CHN)	Susanne Kiermayer (GER)	Irina Laricheva (RUS)

Double Trap
Stage	Venue	1st place, gold medalist(s)	2nd place, silver medalist(s)	3rd place, bronze medalist(s)
1	(Australia) Sydney	No event		
2	(China) Shanghai	Pia Hansen (SWE)	Zhang Yafei (CHN)	Ding Hongping (CHN)
3	(Germany) Suhl	Wang Jing Lin (CHN)	Zhang Yafei (CHN)	Cynthia Meyer (CAN)
4	(Dominican Republic) Santo Domingo	No event		
Final	(Italy) Lonato	Deborah Gelisio (ITA)	Pia Hansen (SWE)	Lin Yi-chun (TPE)

Skeet
Stage	Venue	1st place, gold medalist(s)	2nd place, silver medalist(s)	3rd place, bronze medalist(s)
1	(Australia) Sydney	No event		
2	(China) Shanghai	Andrea Stranovská (SVK)	Chen Zhenru (CHN)	Natalia Rahman (AUS)
3	(Germany) Suhl	Maarit Lepomäki (FIN)	Diána Igaly (HUN)	Véronique Girardet-Allard (FRA)
4	(Dominican Republic) Santo Domingo	No event		
Final	(Italy) Lonato	Wei Ning (CHN)	Diána Igaly (HUN)	Olga Panarina (RUS)
