= Shooting at the 2000 Summer Olympics – Men's double trap =

Sports shooting at the Olympics

Men's double trap at the Games of the XXVII Olympiad
- Venue: Sydney International Shooting Centre
- Date: 20 September 2000
- Competitors: 25 from 20 nations
- Winning score: 187

Medalists
1st place, gold medalist(s)		Richard Faulds	Great Britain
2nd place, silver medalist(s)		Russell Mark	Australia
3rd place, bronze medalist(s)		Fehaid Al Deehani	Kuwait

The men's double trap competition at the 2000 Summer Olympics was held on 20 September. Home shooter Russell Mark set a new Olympic record in the qualification round and was close to defending his inaugural double trap title from Atlanta, but lost the gold medal shoot-off to Richard Faulds. Fehaid Al Deehani won the first Olympic medal ever for Kuwait.

== Records ==
The existing World and Olympic records were as follows.

Qualification records
World record	Michael Diamond (AUS)	147	Barcelona, Spain	19 July 1998
Olympic record	Huang I. C. (TPE)	141	Atlanta, United States	24 July 1996

Final records
World record	Daniele Di Spigno (ITA)	194 (146+48)	Tampere, Finland	7 July 1999
Olympic record	Russell Mark (AUS)	189	Atlanta, United States	24 July 1996

== Qualification round ==
The qualification round consisted of 25 doubles in the A programme, 25 in the B programme, and 25 in the C programme.

Rank	Athlete	Country	A	B	C	Total	Shoot-off	Notes
1	Russell Mark	Australia	46	50	47	143		Q OR
2	Fehaid Al Deehani	Kuwait	46	48	47	141		Q
3	Conny Persson	Sweden	46	49	46	141		Q
4	Richard Faulds	Great Britain	48	48	45	141		Q
5	Roland Gerebics	Hungary	47	47	46	140		Q
6	Lance Bade	United States	45	42	49	136	2	Q
7	Waldemar Schanz	Germany	45	46	45	136	1	
8	Marco Innocenti	Italy	46	43	46	135		
9	Michael Diamond	Australia	44	46	45	135		
10	Mashfi Al-Mutairi	Kuwait	45	45	44	134		
10	Raimo Kauppila	Finland	46	47	41	134		
12	Walton Eller	United States	45	42	46	133		
12	William Keever	United States	43	43	47	133		
14	Aleksey Alipov	Russia	45	46	40	131		
14	Jean-Paul Gros	France	44	44	43	131		
16	Jiři Gach	Czech Republic	46	43	41	130		
17	Daniele Di Spigno	Italy	41	47	41	129		
17	Sergio Piñero	Spain	43	42	44	129		
19	Li Bo	China	39	45	44	128		
20	Ayman Mazhar	Egypt	41	40	44	125		
21	Oğuzhan Tüzün	Turkey	39	42	43	124		
22	Michel Daou	Netherlands Antilles	36	43	42	121		
23	Ahmed Al Maktoum	United Arab Emirates	35	41	44	120		
23	Danilo Caro	Colombia	34	41	45	120		
25	Des Coe	New Zealand	40	41	37	118		

OR Olympic record – Q Qualified for final

== Final ==
The final repeated the C programme for the top six competitors.

Rank	Athlete	Qual	Final	Total	Shoot-off
1st place, gold medalist(s)	Richard Faulds (GBR)	141	46	187	3
2nd place, silver medalist(s)	Russell Mark (AUS)	143	44	187	2
3rd place, bronze medalist(s)	Fehaid Al Deehani (KUW)	141	45	186	
4	Conny Persson (SWE)	141	43	184	
5	Roland Gerebics (HUN)	140	40	180	
6	Lance Bade (USA)	136	43	179	

== Sources ==
- Official Report of the XXVII Olympiad — Shooting (PDF).
