= Shooting at the 2016 Summer Olympics – Men's double trap =

Men's double trap at the Games of the XXXI Olympiad
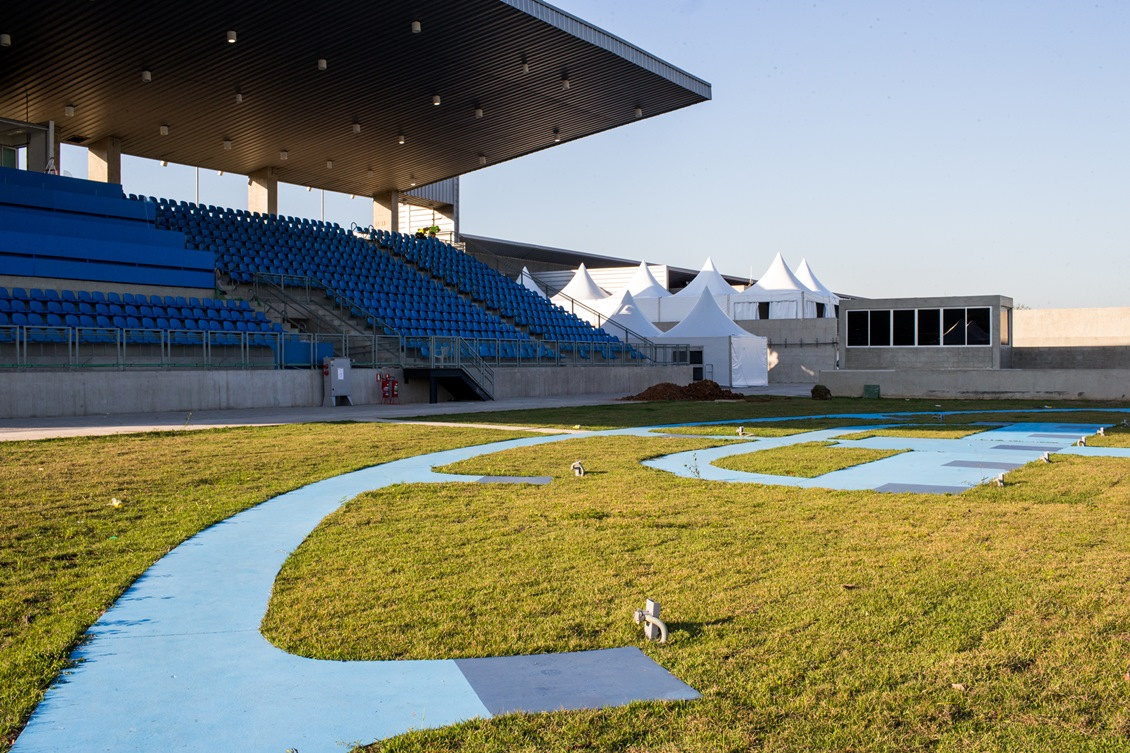
- View of the outdoor field at the National Shooting Center, where the Men's double trap took place.
- Venue: National Shooting Center
- Date: 10 August 2016
- Competitors: 22 from 15 nations
- Winning score: 26/30 (in the gold medal match)

Medalists
1st place, gold medalist(s)		Fehaid Al-Deehani	Independent Olympic Athletes
2nd place, silver medalist(s)		Marco Innocenti	Italy
3rd place, bronze medalist(s)		Steven Scott	Great Britain

The men's double trap event at the 2016 Olympic Games took place on 10 August 2016 at the National Shooting Center.

== Competition format ==
The event consisted of two rounds: a qualifier and a final. In the qualifier, each shooter fired 5 sets of 30 targets in trap shooting, with 10 targets being thrown to the left, 10 to the right, and 10 straight-away in each set. The shooters could take two shots at each target.

The top 6 shooters in the qualifying round moved on to the semifinal round. There, they fired one round of 15 targets, where only one shot could be taken at each target. The top two in the semifinal round advance to gold medal match, while the third and fourth-place shooters relegate to bronze medal match. The medal match is an additional round of 15 targets.

Ties are broken using a shoot-off; additional shots are fired one at a time until there is no longer a tie.

== Records ==
Prior to this competition, the existing world and Olympic records were as follows.

Qualification records
World record	Tim Kneale (GBR)	148	Munich, Germany	9 June 2014
Olympic record	ISSF Rule changed on 1 January 2013	—	—	—

== Qualification round ==
Rank	Athlete	Country	1	2	3	4	5	Total	QS-off	Notes
1	Andreas Löw	Germany	29	27	28	28	28	140		Q, OR
2	James Willett	Australia	30	24	30	29	27	140		Q, OR
3	Tim Kneale	Great Britain	28	27	29	30	25	139		Q
4	Steven Scott	Great Britain	28	25	27	29	29	138		Q
5	Marco Innocenti	Italy	28	28	30	26	24	136		Q
6	Fehaid Al-Deehani	Independent Olympic Athletes	27	24	28	27	29	135	+12	Q
7	Joshua Richmond	United States	27	27	23	29	29	135	+11	
8	Hu Binyuan	China	26	23	28	29	29	135	+7	
9	Khaled Al-Kaabi	United Arab Emirates	27	28	25	25	29	134		
10	Enrique Brol	Guatemala	27	20	17	28	28	133		
11	Vitaly Fokeev	Russia	27	25	27	27	27	133		
12	Pan Qiang	China	28	28	29	24	24	133		
13	Vasily Mosin	Russia	26	23	26	29	28	132		
14	Walton Eller	United States	24	27	26	26	28	131		
15	Ahmad Al-Afasi	Independent Olympic Athletes	24	26	27	26	25	128		
16	Antonino Barillà	Italy	25	25	25	27	23	125		
17	William Chetcuti	Malta	22	25	24	26	26	125		
18	Håkan Dahlby	Sweden	26	24	24	25	22	125		
19	Sean Nicholson	Zimbabwe	24	23	24	24	24	119		
20	Hebert Brol	Guatemala	22	24	21	26	24	116		
21	Mohamed Ramah	Morocco	23	18	28	22	24	115		
22	Paulo Reichardt	Paraguay	25	23	17	19	22	106		

== Semifinal ==
Rank	Athlete	Country	Total	Shoot-off	Notes
1	Fehaid Al-Deehani	Independent Olympic Athletes	28		Gold Medal Match
2	Marco Innocenti	Italy	27		Gold Medal Match
3	Tim Kneale	Great Britain	26	+2	Bronze Medal Match
4	Steven Scott	Great Britain	26	+2	Bronze Medal Match
5	James Willett	Australia	26	+1	
6	Andreas Löw	Germany	25		

== Final (medal matches) ==
Rank	Athlete	Country	Total	Shoot-off	Notes
1st place, gold medalist(s)	Fehaid Al-Deehani	Independent Olympic Athletes	26		
2nd place, silver medalist(s)	Marco Innocenti	Italy	24		
3rd place, bronze medalist(s)	Steven Scott	Great Britain	30		
4	Tim Kneale	Great Britain	28		
