= Shooting at the 2004 Summer Olympics – Men's double trap =

Men's double trap at the Games of the XXVIII Olympiad
- Venue: Markópoulo Olympic Shooting; Centre
- Date: August 17, 2004
- Competitors: 25 from 19 nations
- Winning score: 189 =OR

Medalists
1st place, gold medalist(s)		Ahmed Al Maktoum; United Arab Emirates
2nd place, silver medalist(s)		Rajyavardhan Singh Rathore; India
3rd place, bronze medalist(s)		Wang Zheng; China

The men's double trap competition at the 2004 Summer Olympics was held on August 17 at the Markópoulo Olympic Shooting Centre near Athens, Greece.

The event consisted of two rounds: a qualifier and a final match. In the qualifier round, each shooter fires 3 sets of 50 shots in trap shooting. Shots were paired, with two targets being launched at a time.

The top 6 shooters in the qualifying round moved on to the final round. There, they fire for one additional round of 50. The total score from all 200 shots was used to determine the final ranking. Ties are broken through a shoot-off; additional shots are fired one pair at a time until there is no longer a tie.

Ahmed Al Maktoum, a member of Dubai's royal family, set a historic milestone for the United Arab Emirates by picking up the nation's first ever gold medal in Olympic history. He made a new Olympic record of 179 in the qualification round and increased his six-point lead to a ten-point post-final victory margin at 189. India's Rajyavardhan Singh Rathore, who finished fifth earlier in the prelims with 135, shot steadily in the final round to grab the silver with 179, while China's Wang Zheng scored 178 to edge out his teammate Hu Binyuan for the bronze by a single hit.

Defending Olympic champion Richard Faulds failed to reach the final round after a dismal display in the prelims, posting a total record of 130 out of 150. He finished as thirteenth in a field of twenty-five shooters.

== Records ==
Prior to this competition, the existing world and Olympic records were as follows.

Qualification records
World record	Michael Diamond (AUS)	147	Barcelona, Spain	19 July 1998
Olympic record	Russell Mark (AUS)	143	Sydney, Australia	20 September 2000

Final records
World record	Daniele di Spigno (ITA)	194 (146+48)	Tampere, Finland	7 July 1999
Olympic record	Russell Mark (AUS)	189 (141+48)	Atlanta, United States	24 July 1996

== Qualification round ==
Rank	Athlete	Country	A	B	C	Total	Shoot-off	Notes
1	Ahmed Al Maktoum	United Arab Emirates	48	48	48	144		Q, =OR
2	Håkan Dahlby	Sweden	46	48	44	138		Q
3	Wang Zheng	China	43	49	45	137		Q
4	Waldemar Schanz	Germany	44	44	47	135		Q
5	Rajyavardhan Singh Rathore	India	46	43	46	135		Q
6	Hu Binyuan	China	45	45	44	134	12	Q
7	Daniele Di Spigno	Italy	45	46	43	134	11	
8	Fehaid Al-Deehani	Kuwait	44	44	46	134	3	
9	William Chetcuti	Malta	43	44	47	134	1	
9	Vitaly Fokeev	Russia	44	44	46	134	1	
11	Rashid Hamad Al-Athba	Qatar	38	46	48	132		
12	Mashfi Al-Mutairi	Kuwait	43	43	45	131		
13	Bret Erickson	United States	43	42	45	130		
13	Richard Faulds	Great Britain	41	44	45	130		
15	Steve Haberman	Australia	43	42	44	129		
16	Sean Nicholson	Zimbabwe	44	41	43	128		
17	Walton Eller	United States	41	44	42	127		
17	Marco Innocenti	Italy	41	43	43	127		
19	Vasily Mosin	Russia	38	44	44	126		
19	Thomas Turner	Australia	44	42	40	126		
21	Saleem Al-Nasri	Oman	39	43	43	125		
22	Angelos Spiropoulos	Greece	39	46	39	124		
23	Lucas Rafael Bennazar Ortiz	Puerto Rico	36	42	44	122		
24	Francisco Boza	Peru	40	43	38	121		
25	Joonas Olkkonen	Finland	41	38	39	118		

=OR Equalled Olympic record – Q Qualified for final

== Final ==
Rank	Athlete	Qual	Final	Total	Shoot-off	Notes
1st place, gold medalist(s)	Ahmed Al Maktoum (UAE)	144	45	189		=OR
2nd place, silver medalist(s)	Rajyavardhan Singh Rathore (IND)	135	44	179		
3rd place, bronze medalist(s)	Wang Zheng (CHN)	137	41	178		
4	Hu Binyuan (CHN)	134	43	177	2	
5	Håkan Dahlby (SWE)	138	39	177	1	
6	Waldemar Schanz (GER)	135	40	175		

=OR Equalled Olympic record
