= Double trap =

ISSF shooting sport

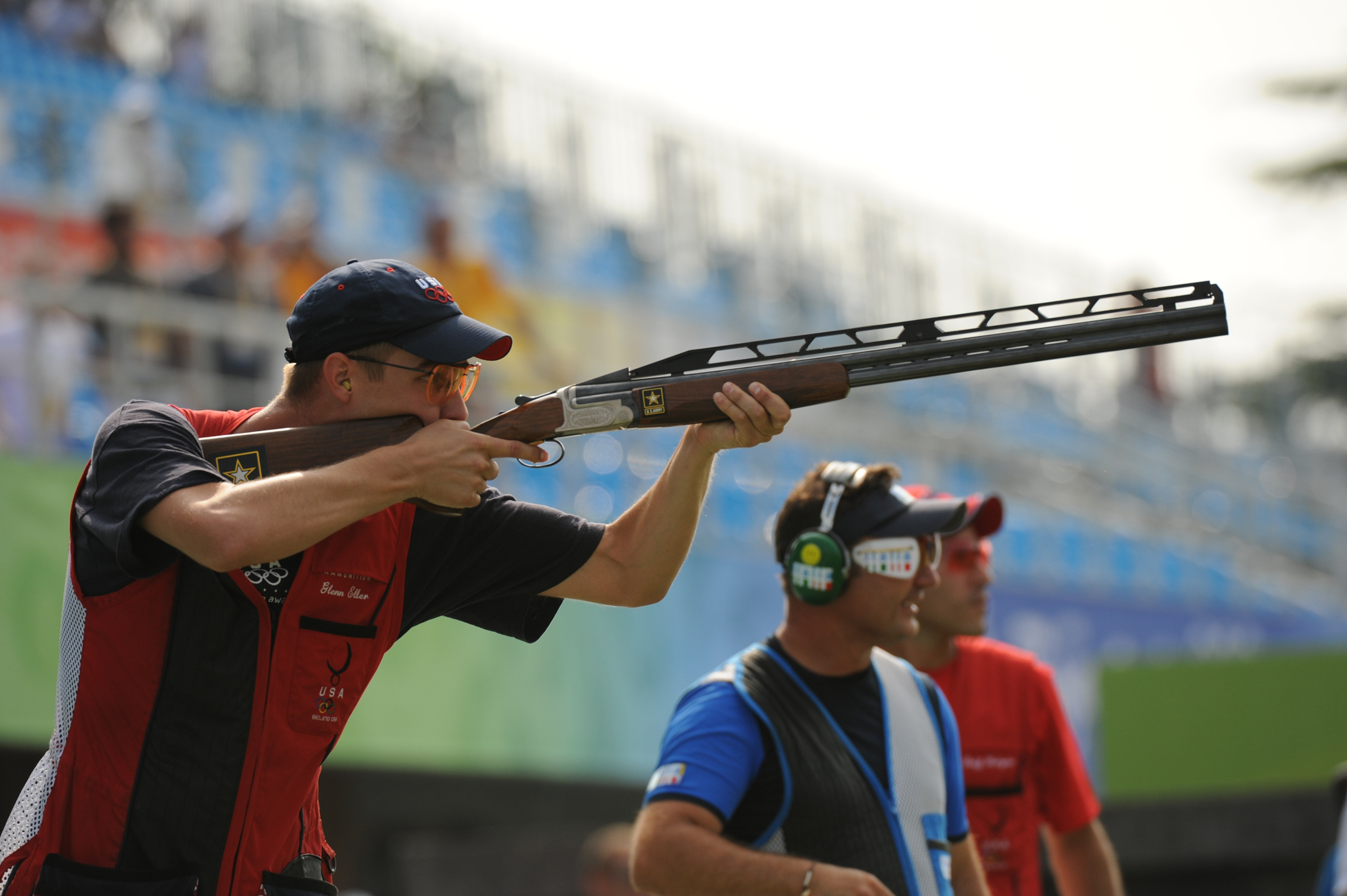

Men
- Number of targets: 150 + 50
- Olympic Games: 1996–2016
- Abbreviation: DT150

Women
- Number of targets: 150
- Olympic Games: 1996–2004
- Abbreviation: DT150W

Double trap is a shotgun shooting sport, one of the ISSF shooting events. Participants use a shotgun to attempt to break a clay disk flung away from the shooter at high speed.

The layout of double trap shooting is similar to that of trap shooting. The shooter stands 16 yards behind the house that releases the targets. Two targets are released simultaneously from the house. They follow set paths, usually 35 degrees to left and right of straightaway. The shooter can take one shot at each target.

== History ==
In international Double Trap competitions, the course of fire is 75 doubles for both men and women. The men's event involves a 25-double final for the top six competitors. The women's event was taken off the Olympic program after the 2004 Summer Olympics. Final shooting for women was discontinued in international competition as a result. The men's event was taken off the Olympic Program prior to the 2020 Summer Olympics resulting in the event being taken off from the ISSF World Cup but still remaining in the ISSF World Championships, Commonwealth Games, Asian Games etc. .

== Olympic Games ==
=== Men ===
| Year | Place | Gold | Silver | Bronze |
|---|---|---|---|---|
| 1996 | (United States) Atlanta | Russell Mark (AUS) | Albano Pera (ITA) | Bing Zhang (CHN) |
| 2000 | (Australia) Sydney | Richard Faulds (GBR) | Russell Mark (AUS) | Fehaid Aldeehani (KUW) |
| 2004 | (Greece) Athens | Ahmed Almaktoum (UAE) | Rajyavardhan Singh Rathore (IND) | Zheng Wang (CHN) |
| 2008 | (China) Beijing | Walton Eller (USA) | Francesco D'Aniello (ITA) | Binyan Hu (CHN) |
| 2012 | (United Kingdom) London | Peter Wilson (GBR) | Håkan Dahlby (SWE) | Vasily Mosin (RUS) |
| 2016 | (Brazil) Rio de Janeiro | Fehaid Al-Deehani (IOA) (Note: Entered as an Independent Olympic Athlete because his native Kuwait was barred from competing due to government interference.) | Marco Innocenti (ITA) | Steven Scott (GBR) |

=== Women ===
| Year | Place | Gold | Silver | Bronze |
|---|---|---|---|---|
| 1996 | (United States) Atlanta | Kimberly Rhode (USA) | Susanne Kiermayer (GER) | Deserie Huddleston (AUS) |
| 2000 | (Australia) Sydney | Pia Hansen (SWE) | Deborah Gelisio (ITA) | Kimberly Rhode (USA) |
| 2004 | (Greece) Athens | Kimberly Rhode (USA) | Bo Na Lee (KOR) | Gao E (CHN) |

== World Championships, Men ==
| Year | Place | Gold | Silver | Bronze |
|---|---|---|---|---|
| 1989 | (Italy) Montecatini Terme | Victorio Taiola (ITA) | Marco Venturini (ITA) | Parini Golfari (ITA) |
| 1990 | (Soviet Union) Moscow | Bret Erickson (USA) | Kevin Gill (GBR) | Jean-Paul Gros (FRA) |
| 1991 | (Australia) Perth | Peter Boden (GBR) | Bret Erickson (USA) | Kevin Gill (GBR) |
| 1993 | (Spain) Barcelona | Joshua Lakatos (USA) | Servet Sivrikaya (TUR) | Albano Pera (ITA) |
| 1994 | (Italy) Fagnano | Russell Mark (AUS) | Kevin Gill (GBR) | Albano Pera (ITA) |
| 1995 | (Cyprus) Nicosia | Steve Haberman (AUS) | Waldemar Schanz (GER) | Jiri Gach (CZE) |
| 1997 | (Peru) Lima | Russell Mark (AUS) | Waldemar Schanz (GER) | Mirco Cenci (ITA) |
| 1998 | (Spain) Barcelona | Michael Diamond (AUS) | Russell Mark (AUS) | Richard Faulds (GBR) |
| 1999 | (Finland) Tampere | Daniele Di Spigno (ITA) | Conny Persson (SWE) | Fehaid Aldeehani (KUW) |
| 2001 | (Egypt) Cairo | Hamad Alafasi (KUW) | Roland Gerebics (HUN) | Shuangchun Li (CHN) |
| 2002 | (Finland) Lahti | Daniele Di Spigno (ITA) | Walton Eller (USA) | Joonas Olkkonen (FIN) |
| 2003 | (Cyprus) Nicosia | Walton Eller (USA) | Russell Mark (AUS) | Rajyavardhan Singh Rathore (IND) |
| 2005 | (Italy) Lonato | Ahmed Al Maktoum (UAE) | Nan Wang (CHN) | Jung Hwan Park (KOR) |
| 2006 | (Croatia) Zagreb | Vitaly Fokeev (RUS) | Binyan Hu (CHN) | Roland Gerebics (HUN) |
| 2007 | (Cyprus) Nicosia | Francesco D'Aniello (ITA) | Binyan Hu (CHN) | Joshua Richmond (USA) |
| 2009 | (Slovenia) Maribor | Francesco D'Aniello (ITA) | Jeffrey Holguin (USA) | Wang Nan (CHN) |
| 2010 | (Germany) Munich | Joshua Richmond (USA) | Vasily Mosin (RUS) | Binyan Hu (CHN) |
| 2011 | (Serbia) Belgrade | Li Jun (CHN) | Andreas Loew (GER) | Walton Eller (USA) |
| 2013 | (Peru) Lima | Walton Eller (USA) | Vasily Mosin (RUS) | Binyan Hu (CHN) |
| 2014 | (Spain) Granada | Joshua Richmond (USA) | Antonino Barillà (ITA) | Steven Scott (GBR) |
| 2015 | (Italy) Lonato | Vasily Mosin (RUS) | Tim Kneale (GBR) | Ahmad Alafasi (KUW) |
| 2017 | (Russia) Moscow | Vitaly Fokeev (RUS) | Ankur Mittal (IND) | Binyan Hu (CHN) |
| 2018 | (South Korea) Changwon | Ankur Mittal (IND) | Yiyang Yang (CHN) | Hubert Andrzej Olejnik (SVK) |

== World Championships, Men Team ==
| Year | Place | Gold | Silver | Bronze |
|---|---|---|---|---|
| 1989 | (Italy) Montecatini Terme | (Italy) Italy; Daniele Cioni; Albano Pera; Marco Venturini | (Australia) Australia; Russell Mark; John Maxwell; Terry Rumbel | (Kuwait) Kuwait; Fehaid Al-Deehani; Ali Al Hammad; Abdallah Alrashidi |
| 1990 | (Soviet Union) Moscow | (France) France; Bernard Blondeau; Jean-Paul Gros; Yves Tronc | (Australia) Australia; Michael Diamond; Russell Mark; Craig Tilley | (Italy) Italy; Daniele Cioni; Albano Pera; Marco Venturini |
| 1991 | (Australia) Perth | (United Kingdom) Great Britain; Peter Boden; Peter Croft; Kevin Gill | (United States) United States; Richard Chordash; Bret Erickson; Jay Waldron | (Italy) Italy; Fabio Casadei; Roberto Scalzone; Marco Venturini |
| 1993 | (Spain) Barcelona | (Italy) Italy; Ercole Buffoli; Mirco Cenci; Albano Pera | (United States) United States; Lance Bade; Bret Erickson; Joshua Lakatos | (Hungary) Hungary; Zoltan Bodo; Karoly Gombos; Janos Kronome |
| 1994 | (Italy) Fagnano | (United Kingdom) Great Britain; John Grice; Kevin Gill; Michael Rouse | (Australia) Australia; Benjamin Kelley; Russell Mark; Craig Tilley | (Italy) Italy; Ercole Buffoli; Mirco Cenci; Albano Pera |
| 1995 | (Cyprus) Nicosia | (Italy) Italy; Mirco Cenci; Daniele Di Spigno; Albano Pera | (Australia) Australia; Steve Haberman; Russell Mark; Craig Tilley | (United States) United States; Lance Bade; Bret Erickson; Steve Puls |
| 1997 | (Peru) Lima | (Italy) Italy; Mirco Cenci; Daniele Di Spigno; Albano Pera | (Australia) Australia; Michael Diamond; Russell Mark; Adam Vella | (United States) United States; David Alcoriza; Lance Bade; Charles Redding |
| 1998 | (Spain) Barcelona | (Australia) Australia; Adam Vella; Michael Diamond; Russell Mark | (Italy) Italy; Luca Marini; Claudio Franzoni; Mirco Cenci | (China) China; Binyan Hu; Bo Li; Bing Zhang |
| 1999 | (Finland) Tampere | (Italy) Italy; Daniele Di Spigno; Marco Innocenti; Luca Marini | (Sweden) Sweden; Conny Persson; Håkan Dahlby; Jonas Berndtsson | (China) China; Binyan Hu; Bo Li; Hao Wang |
| 2001 | (Egypt) Cairo | (United States) United States; David Alcoriza; Walton Eller; Jeffrey Holguin | (Kuwait) Kuwait; Hamad Alafasi; Fehaid Aldeehani; Mashfi Almutairi | (Italy) Italy; Mirco Cenci; Daniele Di Spigno; Marco Innocenti |
| 2002 | (Finland) Lahti | (Italy) Italy; Emanuele Bernasconi; Daniele Di Spigno; Marco Innocenti | (China) China; Binyan Hu; Bo Li; Shuangchun Li | (Kuwait) Kuwait; Hamad Alafasi; Fehaid Aldeehani; Mashfi Almutairi |
| 2003 | (Cyprus) Nicosia | (United States) United States; Walton Eller; Jeffrey Holguin; Bill Keever | (Australia) Australia; Russell Mark; Adam Vella; Steve Haberman | (Italy) Italy; Daniele Di Spigno; Marco Innocenti; Luca Marini |
| 2005 | (Italy) Lonato | (China) China; Nan Wang; Bo Li; Binyan Hu | (United Arab Emirates) United Arab Emirates; Ahmed Al Maktoum; Abdulla Alkendi; Saif Alshamsy | (United States) United States; Jeffrey Holguin; Bret Erickson; Walton Eller |
| 2006 | (Croatia) Zagreb | (United States) United States; Joshua Richmond; Walton Eller; Bill Keever | (China) China; Nan Wang; Binyan Hu; Qiang Pan | (Russia) Russia; Vitaly Fokeev; Boris Morozov; Vasily Mosin |
| 2007 | (Cyprus) Nicosia | (Italy) Italy; Daniele Di Spigno; Francesco D'Aniello; Claudio Franzoni | (China) China; Binyan Hu; Nan Wang; Qiang Pan | (United Kingdom) Great Britain; Steven Scott; Richard Faulds; Peter Robert Russell Wilson |
| 2009 | (Slovenia) Maribor | (United States) United States; Joshua Richmond; Walton Eller; Jeffrey Holguin | (Italy) Italy; Daniele Di Spigno; Francesco D'Aniello; Claudio Franzoni | (United Kingdom) Great Britain; Steven Scott; Richard Faulds; Stevan Walton |
| 2010 | (Germany) Munich | (United States) United States; Joshua Richmond; William Crawford; Jeffrey Holguin | (Russia) Russia; Vitaly Fokeev; Mikhail Leybo; Vasily Mosin | (United Kingdom) Great Britain; Steven Scott; Tim Kneale; Peter Robert Russell Wilson |
| 2011 | (Serbia) Belgrade | (China) China; Binyan Hu; Jun Li; Junjie Mo | (Russia) Russia; Vitaly Fokeev; Vasily Mosin; Mikhail Leybo | (Kuwait) Kuwait; Mashfi Almutairi; Hamad Alafasi; Fehaid Aldeehani |
| 2013 | (Peru) Lima | (United States) United States; Derek Hadldeman; Walton Eller; Jeffrey Holguin | (China) China; Binyan Hu; Hao Wang; Qiang Pan | (Italy) Italy; Antonino Barillà; Davide Gasparini; Daniele Di Spigno |
| 2014 | (Spain) Granada | (Italy) Italy; Antonino Barillà; Daniele Di Spigno; Davide Gasparini | (United States) United States; Joshua Richmond; Jeffrey Holguin; Walton Eller | (China) China; Binyan Hu; Junjie Mo; Jun Li |
| 2015 | (Italy) Lonato | (United Kingdom) Great Britain; Tim Kneale; Matthew Coward-Holley; Matthew French | (Russia) Russia; Vasily Mosin; Vitaly Fokeev; Artem Nekrasov | (India) India; Asab Mohd; Ankur Mittal; Sangram Dahiya |
| 2017 | (Russia) Moscow | (Italy) Italy; Daniele Di Spigno; Antonino Barillà; Alessandro Chianese | (China) China; Binyan Hu; Xinyu Chen; Yiyang Yang | (Russia) Russia; Vitaly Fokeev; Artem Nekrasov; Vasily Mosin |
| 2018 | (South Korea) Changwon | (Italy) Italy; Andrea Vescovi; Daniele Di Spigno; Marco Innocenti | (China) China; Yiyang Yang; Anlong Liu; Ying Qi | (India) India; Ankur Mittal; Asab Mohd; Shardul Vihan |

== World Championships, Women ==
| Year | Place | Gold | Silver | Bronze |
|---|---|---|---|---|
| 1989 | (Italy) Montecatini Terme | Roberta Morara (ITA) | Roberta Pelosi (ITA) | Anna Maria Bianchi (ITA) |
| 1990 | (Soviet Union) Moscow | Satu Pusila (FIN) | Elena Shishirina (URS) | Audrey Grosch (USA) |
| 1991 | (Australia) Perth | Satu Pusila (FIN) | Elena Tkach (URS) | Deena Julin (USA) |
| 1993 | (Spain) Barcelona | Frances Strodtman (USA) | Deena Julin (USA) | Anna Maria Di Giovanni (ITA) |
| 1994 | (Italy) Fagnano | Satu Pusila (FIN) | Elena Shishirina (RUS) | Svetlana Demina (RUS) |
| 1995 | (Cyprus) Nicosia | Deborah Gelisio (ITA) | Gema Usieto (ESP) | Xiang Xu (CHN) |
| 1997 | (Peru) Lima | Deborah Gelisio (ITA) | Cynthia Meyer (CAN) | Riitta-Mari Murtoniemi (FIN) |
| 1998 | (Spain) Barcelona | Deborah Gelisio (ITA) | Kimberly Rhode (USA) | Cindy Gentry (USA) |
| 1999 | (Finland) Tampere | Pia Julin (FIN) | Pia Hansen (SWE) | Yoshiko Miura (JPN) |
| 2001 | (Egypt) Cairo | Yafei Zhang (CHN) | Yi Chun Lin (TPE) | Qingnian Li (CHN) |
| 2002 | (Finland) Lahti | Yi Chun Lin (TPE) | Jing Lin Wang (CHN) | Hye Kyoung Son (KOR) |
| 2003 | (Cyprus) Nicosia | María Quintanal (ESP) | Fang Chen (CHN) | Jing Lin Wang (CHN) |
| 2005 | (Italy) Lonato | Jing Lin Wang (CHN) | Qingnian Li (CHN) | Monica Girotto (ITA) |
| 2006 | (Croatia) Zagreb | Hye Kyoung Son (KOR) | Yuxiang Li (CHN) | Bo Na Lee (KOR) |
| 2010 | (Germany) Munich | Rui Li (CHN) | Yafei Zhang (CHN) | Qingnian Li (CHN) |

== World Championships, Women Team ==
| Year | Place | Gold | Silver | Bronze |
|---|---|---|---|---|
| 1990 | (Soviet Union) Moscow | (Soviet Union) Soviet Union; Maya Gubieva; Irina Laricheva; Elena Shishirina | (China) China; Ruizhen Lu; Yujin Wang; Weiping Yin | (United States) United States; Carol Gephart; Audrey Grosch; Denise Morrison |
| 1991 | (Australia) Perth | (Soviet Union) Soviet Union; Victoria Chuyko; Elena Shishirina; Elena Tkach | (China) China; Li Li; Yujin Wang; Weiping Yin | (France) France; Muriel Bernard; Mauricette Colavito; Gisele Renaud |
| 1993 | (Spain) Barcelona | (United States) United States; Terry Bankey; Deena Julin; Frances Strodtman | (Italy) Italy; Anna Maria Di Giovanni; Deborah Gelisio; Zdenka Ratek | (China) China; Gao E Yujin Wang; Weiping Yin |
| 1994 | (Italy) Fagnano | (Russia) Russia; Svetlana Demina; Irina Laricheva; Elena Shishirina | (Finland) Finland; Satu Makela; Riitta-Mari Murtoniemi; Satu Pusila | (China) China; Gao E Yingzi Liu; Yujin Wang |
| 1995 | (Cyprus) Nicosia | (Italy) Italy; Deborah Gelisio; Nadia Innocenti; Giovanna Pasello | (China) China; Hongping Ding; Yujin Wang; Xing Xu | (United States) United States; Deena Julin; Kimberly Rhode; Theresa Wentzel |
| 1997 | (Peru) Lima | (Italy) Italy; Deborah Gelisio; Nadia Innocenti; Arianna Perilli | (China) China; Hongping Ding; Xiaoguang Jiang; Yunxia Wu | (Russia) Russia; Elena Kravtchouk; Elena Rabaia; Elena Tkach |
| 1998 | (Spain) Barcelona | (United States) United States; Kimberly Rhode; Deena Minyard; Cindy Gentry | (China) China; Mei Zhu; Gao E Hongping Ding | (South Korea) Korea; Hye Kyoung Son; Eun Sim Lee; Hyun Ok Jin |
| 1999 | (Finland) Tampere | (China) China; Yafei Zhang; Gao E Hongping Ding | (Japan) Japan; Yoshiko Miura; Yukie Nakayama; Akane Tahara | (Finland) Finland; Pia Julin; Satu Pusila; Riitta-Mari Murtoniemi |
| 2001 | (Egypt) Cairo | (China) China; Hongping Ding; Qingnian Li; Yafei Zhang | (United States) United States; Kyndra Hogan; Kimberly Rhode; Elizabeth Schad | (Chinese Taipei) Chinese Taipei; Yi Chun Lin; Kai Lu Wen; Meng Ying Wu |
| 2002 | (Finland) Lahti | (China) China; Hongping Ding; Jing Lin Wang; Yafei Zhang | (United States) United States; Joetta Dement; Theresa Dewitt; Kimberly Rhode | (Chinese Taipei) Chinese Taipei; Yi Chun Lin; Kai Lu Wen; Meng Ying Wu |
| 2003 | (Cyprus) Nicosia | (China) China; Qingnian Li; Jing Lin Wang; Fang Chen | (United States) United States; Kimberly Rhode; Joetta Dement; Kyndra Hogan | (Russia) Russia; Elena Rabaia; Elena Dudnik; Liudmila Khokhlova |

== World Championships, total medals ==
| Rank | Nation | Gold | Silver | Bronze | Total |
|---|---|---|---|---|---|
| 1 | Italy | 18 | 5 | 12 | 35 |
| 2 | United States | 10 | 10 | 9 | 29 |
| 3 | China | 7 | 15 | 9 | 31 |
| 4 | United Arab Emirates | 6 | 4 | 7 | 17 |
| 5 | Australia | 5 | 8 | 0 | 13 |
| 6 | Finland | 4 | 1 | 3 | 8 |
| 7 | Great Britain | 3 | 2 | 4 | 9 |
| 8 | Soviet Union | 2 | 2 | 0 | 4 |
| 9 | Russia | 2 | 1 | 4 | 7 |
| 10 | India | 1 | 1 | 3 | 5 |
| 10 | Kuwait | 1 | 1 | 3 | 5 |
| 12 | Chinese Taipei | 1 | 1 | 2 | 4 |
| 13 | Spain | 1 | 1 | 0 | 2 |
| 14 | South Korea | 1 | 0 | 4 | 5 |
| 15 | France | 1 | 0 | 2 | 3 |
| 16 | Sweden | 0 | 3 | 0 | 3 |
| 17 | Germany | 0 | 2 | 0 | 2 |
| 18 | Hungary | 0 | 1 | 2 | 3 |
| 19 | Japan | 0 | 1 | 1 | 2 |
| 20 | Canada | 0 | 1 | 0 | 1 |
| 20 | Turkey | 0 | 1 | 0 | 1 |
| 22 | Czech Republic | 0 | 0 | 1 | 1 |
| Totals (22 entries) | | 63 | 61 | 66 | 190 |

== Current world records ==
Current ISSF world records in double trap as of April 5, 2018
| Men | Individual | 148 | Tim Kneale (GBR) | June 9, 2014 | Munich (GER) |
| Men | Teams | 424 | Italy (Innocenti, Bernasconi, Gasparini); Italy (Barillà, Di Spigno, Gasparini) | August 3, 2013; September 14, 2014 | Suhl (GER); Granada (ESP) |
| Junior Men | Individual | 142 | James Willett (AUS); Andrea Galesso (ITA) | March 24, 2015; May 1, 2016 | Al Ain (UAE); Suhl (GER) |
| Junior Men | Teams | 410 | Russia (Slepushkin, Zagumennov, Fokeev) | August 3, 2013 | Suhl (GER) |
| Women | Individual | 136 | Qingnian Li (CHN) | August 23, 2018 | Jakarta (INA) |
| Women | Teams | | WR Not Established Yet | January 1, 2018 | |
| Junior Women | Individual | 107 | Valeriya Sokha (ITA) | August 6, 2018 | Leobersdorf (AUT) |
| Junior Women | Teams | | WR Not Established Yet | January 1, 2018 | |

== See also ==
- ISSF Olympic trap
- ISSF Olympic skeet
- ISSF shooting events
