= Shooting at the 2012 Summer Olympics – Men's double trap =

Men's double trap at the Games of the XXX Olympiad
- Venue: Royal Artillery Barracks
- Date: 2 August 2012
- Competitors: 24 from 19 nations
- Winning score: 188

Medalists
1st place, gold medalist(s)		Peter Wilson	Great Britain
2nd place, silver medalist(s)		Håkan Dahlby	Sweden
3rd place, bronze medalist(s)		Vasily Mosin	Russia

The men's double trap event at the 2012 Olympic Games took place on 2 August 2012 at the Royal Artillery Barracks.

The event consisted of two rounds: a qualifier and a final. In the qualifier, each shooter fired 3 sets of 50 shots in trap shooting. Shots were paired, with two targets being launched at a time.

The top 6 shooters in the qualifying round moved on to the final round. There, they fired one additional round of 50. The total score from all 200 shots was used to determine final ranking. Ties are broken using a shoot-off; additional shots are fired one pair at a time until there is no longer a tie.

== Records ==
Prior to this competition, the existing world and Olympic records were as follows.

Qualification records
World record	Vitaly Fokeev (RUS)	148	Concepción, Chile	3 March 2011
Olympic record	Walton Eller (USA)	145	Beijing, China	12 August 2008

Final records
World record	Peter Wilson (GBR)	198 (148+50)	Tucson, United States	28 March 2012
Olympic record	Walton Eller (USA)	190 (145+45)	Beijing, China	12 August 2008

== Qualification round ==
Rank	Athlete	Country	A	B	C	Total	Notes
1	Peter Wilson	Great Britain	48	48	47	143	Q
2	Vasily Mosin	Russia	48	45	47	140	Q
3	Fehaid Al-Deehani	Kuwait	47	47	46	140	Q
4	Vitaly Fokeev	Russia	44	48	47	139	Q
5	Håkan Dahlby	Sweden	45	46	46	137	Q
6	Richárd Bognár	Hungary	44	49	44	137	Q
7	Rashid Hamad Al-Athba	Qatar	43	46	47	136	
8	Francesco D'Aniello	Italy	48	44	44	136	
9	William Chetcuti	Malta	43	47	45	135	
10	Li Jun	China	40	47	47	134	
11	Ronjan Sodhi	India	48	44	42	134	
12	Richard Faulds	Great Britain	39	46	48	133	
13	Juma Al-Maktoum	United Arab Emirates	42	45	46	133	
14	Hu Binyuan	China	42	48	43	133	
15	Alistair Davis	South Africa	43	43	46	132	
16	Joshua Richmond	United States	44	42	45	131	
17	Filipe Fuzaro	Brazil	44	44	43	131	
18	Daniele Di Spigno	Italy	43	46	42	131	
19	Ahmed Al-Hatmi	Oman	37	46	46	129	
20	Russell Mark	Australia	43	41	44	128	
21	José Torres Laboy	Puerto Rico	41	43	43	127	
22	Walton Eller	United States	41	43	42	126	
23	Anton Glasnović	Croatia	38	34	42	114	
DNS	Sergio Piñero	Dominican Republic	Did not start				

== Final ==
Rank	Athlete	Qual	Final	Total	Bronze shoot-off
1st place, gold medalist(s)	Peter Wilson (GBR)	143	45	188	
2nd place, silver medalist(s)	Håkan Dahlby (SWE)	137	49	186	
3rd place, bronze medalist(s)	Vasily Mosin (RUS)	140	45	185	2
4	Fehaid Al-Deehani (KUW)	140	45	185	1
5	Vitaly Fokeev (RUS)	139	45	184	
6	Richárd Bognár (HUN)	137	45	182	
