= 2004 ISSF World Cup =

For the 2004 ISSF World Cup Final in the seventeen Olympic shooting events, the World Cup Final was held in September 2004 in Maribor, Slovenia for the shotgun events, and in October 2004 in Bangkok, Thailand for the rifle, pistol and running target events. It was the last World Cup Final for the women's Double Trap event and the men's 10 m Running Target event, as they were taken off the Olympic program after 2004.

== Shotgun ==
The winners in Maribor were:

- Adam Vella, Australia, in men's Trap
- Marco Innocenti, Italy, in men's Double Trap
- Tore Brovold, Norway, in men's Skeet
- Zuzana Štefečeková, Slovakia, in women's Trap
- Li Qingnian, China, in women's Double Trap
- Wei Ning, China, in women's Skeet

== Rifle, pistol and running target ==
Munich, Germany is traditionally the steady home of this competition, but 2004 was the second year in a row that it was held at another venue. The winners in Bangkok were:

- Matthew Emmons, United States, in men's 50 m Rifle Three Positions
- Christian Lusch, Germany, in men's 50 m Rifle Prone
- Zhu Qinan, China, in men's 10 m Air Rifle
- Martin Tenk, Czech Republic, in men's 50 m Pistol
- Ralf Schumann, Germany, in men's 25 m Rapid Fire Pistol
- Mikhail Nestruev, Russia, in men's 10 m Air Pistol
- Aleksandr Blinov, Russia, in men's 10 m Running Target
- Lioubov Galkina, Russia, in women's 50 m Rifle Three Positions
- Du Li, China, in women's 10 m Air Rifle
- Mariya Grozdeva, Bulgaria, in women's 25 m Pistol
- Nino Salukvadze, Georgia, in women's 10 m Air Pistol
