= Thomas Turner (sport shooter) =

Australian sport shooter (born 1972)

Personal information
- Full name: Thomas John Turner
- Nationality: Australia
- Born: 13 November 1972 (age 54) Cessnock, New South Wales, Australia
- Height: 1.87 m (6 ft 1 1/2 in)
- Weight: 100 kg (220 lb)

Sport
- Sport: Shooting
- Event: Double trap (DT150)
- Club: Cessnock Clay Target Club
- Coached by: Thomas Arthur Turner (club); Greg Chan (national)

Thomas John "Tom" Turner (born 13 November 1972 in Cessnock, New South Wales) is an Australian sport shooter. He has won several age group Australian and Oceanian championship titles in double trap shooting, and also had a golden opportunity to represent Australia at the 2004 Summer Olympics in Athens. Turner is also a member of Cessnock Clay Target Shooting Range and the Australian Clay Target Shooting Association, where he trains full-time under head coach Greg Chan.

Turner made his first Australian squad, along with teammate and Olympic veteran Steve Haberman in the men's double trap at the 2004 Summer Olympics in Athens. Turner finished first at the Olympic trials to fill out the Olympic place won by 1996 champion Russell Mark from the ISSF World Cup meet in Perth a year earlier, and then joined with his teammate Steve Haberman to the Australian team that crushed Mark's opportunity to compete for the Games. A less experienced on the international scene in the midst of Mark's startling absence, Turner showed off his best to eagerly shoot 126 hits out of 150 in the qualifying round, which was worthily enough to charge a two-way tie with Russia's Vasily Mosin for nineteenth place.
