= Shooting at the 2008 Summer Olympics – Men's double trap =

Men's double trap at the Games of the XXIX Olympiad
- Venue: Beijing Shooting Range Clay Target Field
- Date: August 12, 2008
- Competitors: 19 from 14 nations
- Winning score: 190 (OR)

Medalists
1st place, gold medalist(s)		Walton Eller	United States
2nd place, silver medalist(s)		Francesco D'Aniello	Italy
3rd place, bronze medalist(s)		Hu Binyuan	China

The men's double trap event at the 2008 Summer Olympics took place on August 12 at the Beijing Shooting Range Clay Target Field. Walton Eller, the gold medal winner in this event, broke two Olympic records for both the qualification and final rounds.

The event consisted of two rounds: a qualifier and a final. In the qualifier, each shooter fired 3 sets of 50 shots in trap shooting. Shots were paired, with two targets being launched at a time.

The top 6 shooters in the qualifying round moved on to the final round. There, they fired one additional round of 50. The total score from all 200 shots was used to determine final ranking. Ties are broken using a shoot-off; additional shots are fired one pair at a time until there is no longer a tie.

== Records ==
Prior to this competition, the existing world and Olympic records were as follows.

Qualification records
World record	Michael Diamond (AUS); Richard Faulds (GBR); Ronjan Sodhi (IND)	147	Barcelona, Spain; Suhl, Germany; Belgrade, Serbia	19 July 1998; 8 June 2008; 18 June 2008
Olympic record	Ahmed Al Maktoum (UAE)	144	Athens, Greece	17 August 2004

Final records
World record	Daniele Di Spigno (ITA); Ronjan Sodhi (IND)	194 (146+48); 194 (147+47)	Tampere, Finland; Belgrade, Serbia	7 July 1999; 18 June 2008
Olympic record	Russell Mark (AUS); Ahmed Al Maktoum (UAE)	189 (141+48); 189 (144+45)	Atlanta, United States; Athens, Greece	24 July 1996; 17 August 2004

During the competition, Walton Eller broke both Olympic records by a one-hit margin.

== Qualification round ==
The qualification round was held between 9:00 and 13:00 China Standard Time (UTC+8). It consisted of three programs of 25 doubles each. In the A and B programs, the two targets were simultaneously thrown with a difference of five degrees (one straight and one to the side); in the C program, this was increased to ten degrees (one to each side).

Rank	Athlete	Country	A	B	C	Total	Shoot-off	Notes
1	Walton Eller	United States	48	49	48	145		Q OR
2	Francesco D'Aniello	Italy	48	46	47	141		Q
3	Jeffrey Holguin	United States	45	48	47	140		Q
4	Hu Binyuan	China	48	42	48	138		Q
5	Richard Faulds	Great Britain	45	46	46	137		Q
6	Russell Mark	Australia	45	48	43	136	6	Q
7	Ahmed Al Maktoum	United Arab Emirates	46	45	45	136	5	
8	William Chetcuti	Malta	47	45	44	136	3	
9	Roland Gerebics	Hungary	44	47	45	136	1	
10	Daniele Di Spigno	Italy	44	46	45	135		
11	Håkan Dahlby	Sweden	45	45	45	135		
12	Wang Nan	China	42	46	46	134		
13	Steven Scott	Great Britain	43	45	46	134		
14	Vasily Mosin	Russia	41	47	43	131		
15	Rajyavardhan Singh Rathore	India	43	45	43	131		
16	Vitaly Fokeev	Russia	45	44	41	130		
17	Lucas Rafael Bennazar Ortiz	Puerto Rico	45	39	39	123		
18	Graeme Ede	New Zealand	38	40	35	113		
19	Giuseppe Di Salvatore	Canada	38	34	37	109		

OR Olympic record – Q Qualified for final

== Final ==
The final was held at 15:00 China Standard Time (UTC+8). It repeated the C program for the top 6 shooters, and added the results to those of the qualification round.

Rank	Athlete	Qual	Final	Total	Notes
1st place, gold medalist(s)	Walton Eller (USA)	145	45	190	OR
2nd place, silver medalist(s)	Francesco D'Aniello (ITA)	141	46	187	
3rd place, bronze medalist(s)	Hu Binyuan (CHN)	138	46	184	
4	Jeffrey Holguin (USA)	140	42	182	
5	Russell Mark (AUS)	136	45	181	
6	Richard Faulds (GBR)	137	43	180	

OR Olympic record
