= Shooting at the 2014 Commonwealth Games – Men's double trap =

Shooting – Men's double trap at the 2014 Commonwealth Games
- Venue: Barry Buddon Shooting Centre
- Dates: 27 July 2014
- Competitors: 19 from 10 nations

Medalists
gold medal	Steven Scott	England
silver medal	Matthew French	England
bronze medal	Mohammed Asab	India

The Men's double trap took place on 27 July 2014 at the Barry Buddon Shooting Centre. There was a qualification in which the top 8 athletes qualified for the finals.

== Results ==
=== Qualification ===
Rank	Name	1	2	3	4	5	Total	Notes
1	Mohammed Asab (IND)	27	27	28	28	25	135	Q
2	Ankur Mittal (IND)	29	25	25	28	25	132	Q
3	Matthew French (ENG)	29	25	26	27	25	132	Q
4	Steven Scott (ENG)	27	24	27	30	24	132	Q
5	Nathan Xuereb (MLT)	24	28	26	26	27	131	Q
6	Thomas Turner (AUS)	23	26	26	26	27	128	Q
7	William Chetcuti (MLT)	25	24	24	24	28	125	
8	Seng Chye Khor (MAS)	24	28	25	24	24	125	
9	Jake Keeling (IOM)	25	24	28	24	23	124	
10	Russell Mark (AUS)	27	23	25	26	22	123	
11	Paul Shaw (CAN)	25	23	21	26	26	121	
12	Tim Kneale (IOM)	24	21	26	26	23	120	
13	Benjamin Cheng Jie Khor (MAS)	22	24	24	24	24	118	
14	Axel Rodriguez-Reid (FAI)	17	14	16	17	16	80	
15	Mitchell Meers (NFI)	13	14	12	21	15	75	
16	Sione Togiavalu (NIU)	16	14	13	12	13	68	
17	Hivi Puheke (NIU)	11	12	7	8	14	52	
18	Shaun Jaffray (FAI)	11	6	8	14	13	52	
−	Bill Burton (NFI)	−	−	−	−	−	÷	DNS

=== Semifinals ===
Rank	Name	Points	Notes
1	Steven Scott (ENG)	27	QG
2	Matthew French (ENG)	27	QG
3	Mohammed Asab (IND)	27	QB
4	Nathan Xuereb (MLT)	26	QB
5	Ankur Mittal (IND)	25	
6	Thomas Turner (AUS)	25	

QB: Qualified to Bronze

QG: Qualified to Gold

=== Finals ===
Rank	Name	Points	Notes
1st place, gold medalist(s)	Steven Scott (ENG)	30	
2nd place, silver medalist(s)	Matthew French (ENG)	29	
3rd place, bronze medalist(s)	Mohammaed Asab (IND)	26	
4	Nathan Xuereb (MLT)	24	
