= Alistair Davis (sport shooter) =

South African Olympic sport shooter

Personal information
- Nationality: South Africa
- Born: 1 December 1992 (age 33) Pretoria, South Africa
- Height: 1.82 m (5 ft 11 1/2 in)
- Weight: 87.9998 kg (194 lb)

Sport
- Sport: Shooting
- Events: Trap, double trap
- Club: Centurion Gun Club
- Coached by: Frank Davis
- Retired: 2014

Alistair Davis (born 1 December 1992) is a retired South African sport shooter. He won a gold medal in the men's double trap at the 2011 African Shooting Championships in Rabat, Morocco, with a total score of 182 targets, earning him a spot on the South African team for the Olympics. Davis is also a member of Centurion Gun Club in Pretoria, and is coached and trained by his father Frank Davis.

Davis represented South Africa at the 2012 Summer Olympics in London, where he competed as the nation's lone shooter in the men's double trap. He scored a total of 132 targets in the qualifying rounds, one point behind Chinese shooter and Olympic bronze medalist Hu Binyuan, finishing in fifteenth place—the highest finish at the Olympics by a South African in clay target categories.
