= Glenn Eller =

American sports shooter

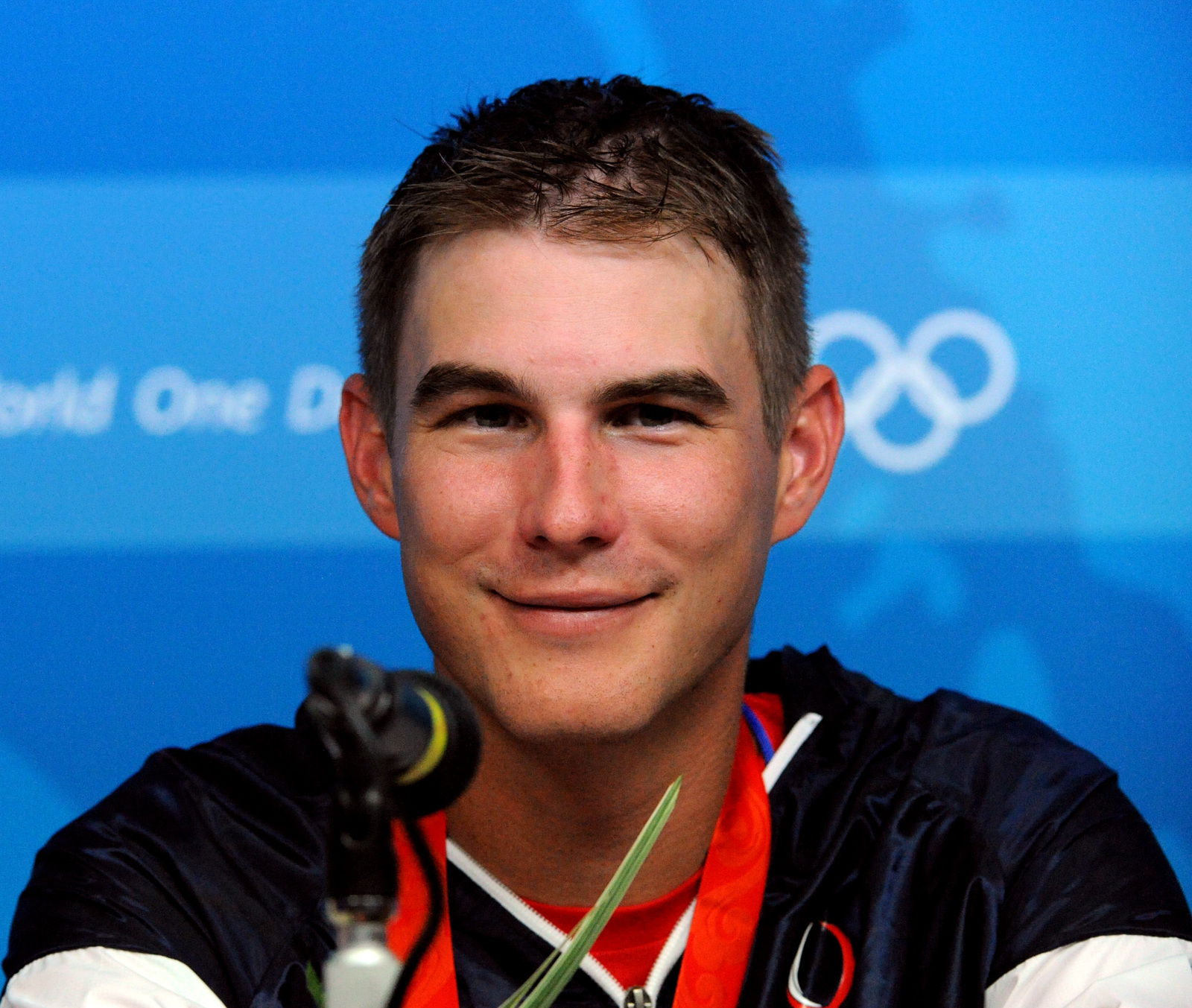
- Eller in 2008

Personal information
- Full name: Walton Glenn Eller III
- Born: January 6, 1982 (age 44) Houston, Texas, U.S.
- Height: 1.90 m (6 ft 3 in)
- Weight: 84 kg (185 lb)

Sport
- Country: United States
- Sport: Shooting
- Event: Trap
Medal record
Men's shooting
Representing the United States
Olympic Games
Gold medal – first place	2008 Beijing	Double trap
World Championships
Gold medal – first place	2013 Lima	Double trap
Silver medal – second place	2018 Changwon	Trap team

Walton Glenn Eller III (born January 6, 1982) is an American trap shooter and five-time U.S. Olympic athlete (2000, 2004, 2008, 2012, 2016). At the 2008 Summer Olympics, he won the gold medal in men's double trap setting both an Olympic Record and a Final Olympic Record.

Eller was born in Houston, Texas, the son of Clara Anne (née Rackley) and Walton Glenn Eller Jr. He attended James E. Taylor High School in Katy, a suburb of Houston. In 1996, Eller was the first American to win the British Open Sporting Clay junior title. In 1994, he was the U.S. National Sporting Clay subjunior champion.

Additionally, Glenn Eller is a Sergeant First Class in the United States Army. He is part of the U.S. Army Marksmanship Unit (USAMU), stationed at Ft. Benning, Georgia.

== Olympic results ==
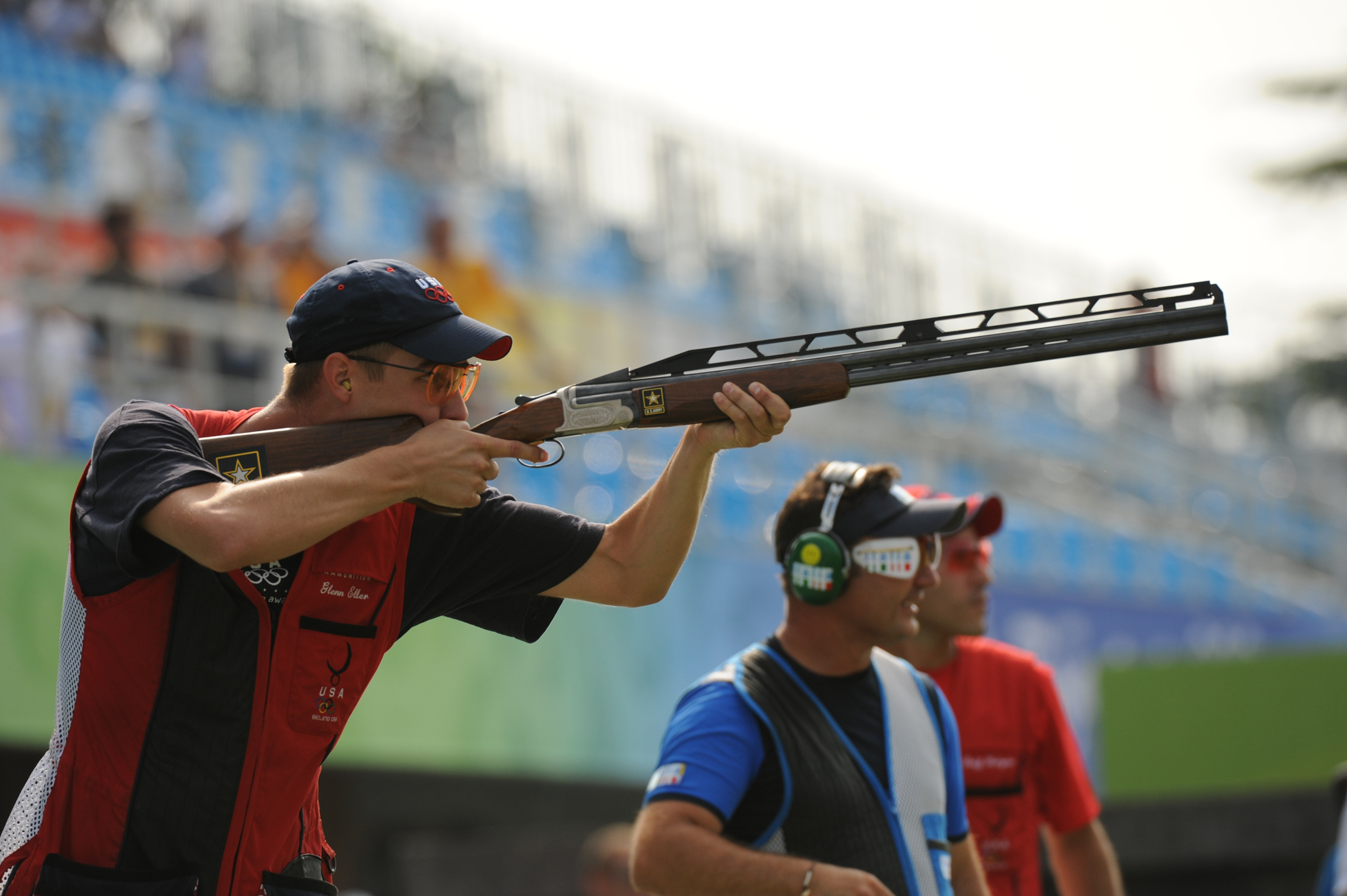
Eller at the 2008 Summer Olympics double trap finals.

Event	2000	2004	2008	2012	2016
Double trap	12th 133	17th 127	(gold) Gold; 145+45	22nd 126	14th 131

== Records ==
Current world records held in double trap
Men	Teams	424	Italy (Innocenti, Bernasconi, Gasparini); Italy (Barillà, Di Spigno, Gasparini)	August 3, 2013; September 14, 2014	Suhl (GER); Granada (ESP)
