= Richard Faulds =

English sport shooter (born 1977)

Richard Faulds MBE
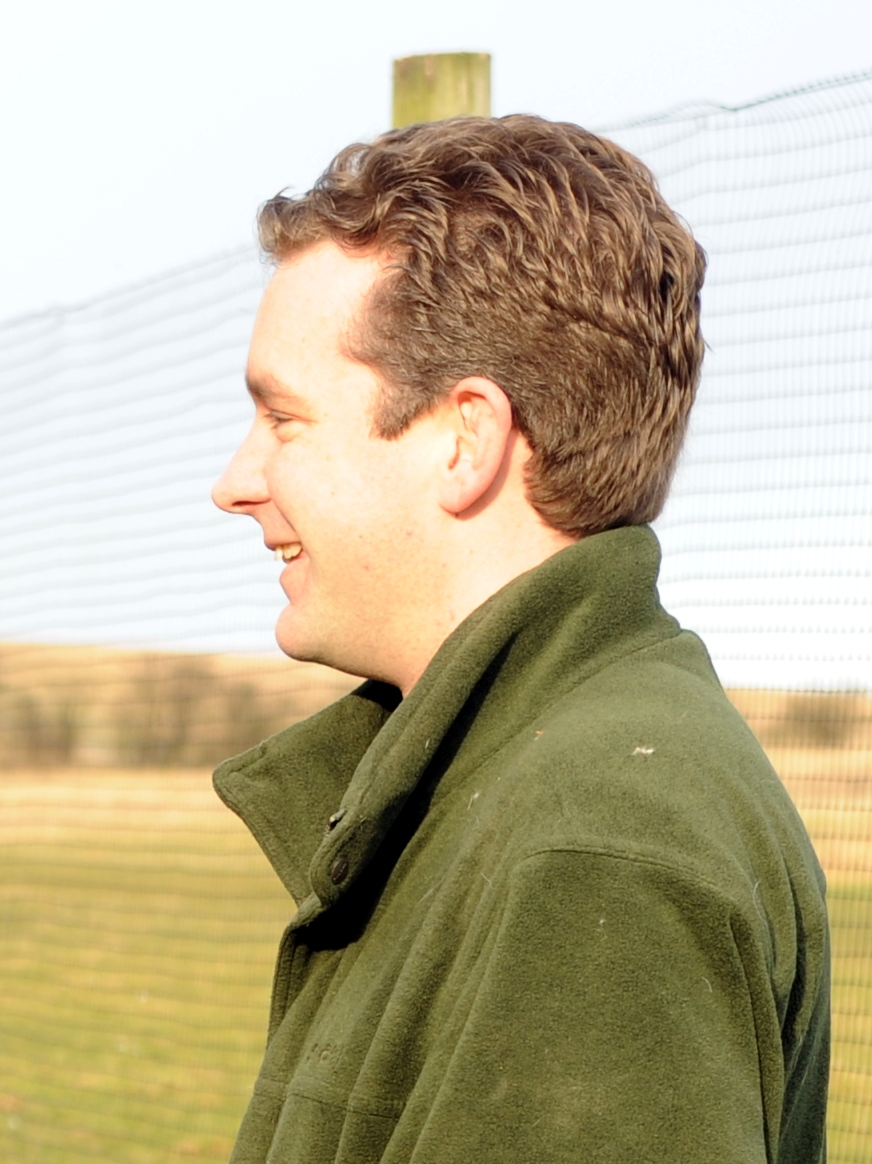
- Richard Faulds in 2009

Personal information
- Full name: Richard Bruce Faulds
- Nationality: Great Britain
- Born: 16 March 1977 (age 49) Guildford, Surrey, England
- Height: 1.83 m (6 ft 0 in)
- Weight: 83 kg (183 lb)

Sport
- Sport: Shooting
- Event: Double trap (DT150)
Medal record
Men's shooting
Representing Great Britain
Olympic Games
Gold medal – first place	2000 Sydney	Double trap

Richard Bruce Faulds MBE (born 16 March 1977 in Guildford, Surrey), is a retired English sport shooter, who competed for Great Britain in the 2000 Summer Olympics and won the men's double trap. He also competed at the 1996, 2004, 2008 and 2012 Summer Olympics.

Born into a family who then ran a stud farm in Sussex, Faulds was then raised on the 300-acre (1.2 km^{2}) family-owned Owl's Lodge Farm in the Hampshire village of Longparish. On his tenth birthday, Faulds's father Bruce bought him some shooting lessons, with Richard hitting 17 out of 25 clays in his first attempt. His father built him a range on the family farm, but just before finishing third in his first world junior championship, his PE teacher said that his hand–eye co-ordination was very poor. It was discovered that Faulds suffered from a weak left eye, which was corrected by special dot-to-dot exercises with such good effect that he now shoots left-handed.

Faulds competed internationally for Britain at the age of 13, and was a world junior champion when he was 16. Three years later, Faulds competed in the 1996 Atlanta Olympics finishing fifth, and became the 1997 European champion. After working at the West London Gun Club for three years as an instructor, Faulds became a full-time shooter, and qualified for the 2000 Sydney games after shooting a then double trap world record score at a World Cup meeting held again in Atlanta, Georgia. Faulds shot a then Olympic record total of 143 in the preliminary round, and won his Olympic gold medal after a shoot-off at the Sydney International Shooting Centre, to become Britain's first shooting gold medal-winner since Malcolm Cooper in 1988.

At the 2004 Athens Olympics, Faulds came 13th in the double trap event, losing his title to Ahmed Al Maktoum from the United Arab Emirates.

Apart from his Olympic career he has also won numerous titles in the sport of English Sporting Clays and FITASC, both of which closely replicate the flight characteristics of live quarry species. His first World title came as a Junior in the FITASC discipline in 1993, a feat he repeated in 1994, 95 and 96 while also collecting Junior World Sporting titles in 1994 and 1995. Since joining the ranks of the Senior Class he has won the World Sporting Championships four times, (2000, 2002, 2006, 2008) the World FITASC Championship four times (2002, 2005, 2007, 2008) and the Beretta World Sporting Championship five times (1998, 2002, 2006, 2008 and 2010).

He has also taken numerous domestic titles including the English Open Sporting (1993, 2003, 2004, 2006, 2008) and the British Open Sporting (1998, 2005).

Richard and Tanya, also a successful shooter in her own right live near Newbury in Berkshire along with their young son Charlie and daughter Lauren.

In 2010 Richard and Tanya opened Owls Lodge Shooting School near Barton Stacey. The ground contains Sporting, Olympic trap, Double trap, Olympic skeet, Universal trench and Down-The-Line layouts.

In 2011, Faulds won individual silver and team gold in the double trap at the European Shooting Championships in Serbia.

On 16 December 2014, Faulds announced his retirement from competitive shooting, ending his career with five Olympic appearances, two bronze medals from the World Championships, a tally of five European medals (one gold, three silver, and one bronze) from the European Championships, an Olympic gold medal from 2000, and a world record in double trap, set in 1998.

== Olympic results ==
Event	1996	2000	2004	2008	2012
Double trap	5th 139+41	(gold) Gold; 141+46	13th 130	6th 137+43	12th 133
