= Richárd Bognár =

Hungarian sport shooter

Personal information
- Nationality: Hungary
- Born: 25 April 1967 (age 59) Mosonmagyaróvár, Hungary
- Height: 1.81 m (5 ft 11 1/2 in)
- Weight: 105 kg (231 lb)

Sport
- Sport: Shooting
- Event: Double trap
- Club: Honved Bolyai Janos SE
- Coached by: Erzsebet Vasvari

Richárd Bognár (born 25 April 1967 in Mosonmagyaróvár) is a Hungarian sport shooter. He achieved a sixth-place finish in the men's double trap at the 2011 ISSF World Cup series in Maribor, Slovenia, with a total score of 191 targets, earning him a spot on the Hungarian team for the Olympics. Bognar is also a member of Honved Bolyai Janos SE, and is coached and trained by Erzsebet Vasvari.

At age 45, Bognar held the distinction of being the oldest member of the Hungarian team selected for the 2012 Summer Olympics in London, where he competed in the men's double trap. He only finished in sixth place, with a total score of 182 targets (137 in the preliminary rounds and 45 in the final), six points behind winner and world-record holder Peter Wilson of Great Britain.
