= Tim Kneale =

Manx sport shooter (born 1982)

Personal information
- Full name: Timothy Kneale
- Nationality: Great Britain
- Born: 16 October 1982 (age 43) Douglas, Isle of Man
- Height: 1.87 m (6 ft 1 1/2 in)
- Weight: 85 kg (187 lb)

Sport
- Sport: Shooting
- Event: Double trap (DT150)
- Club: Nuthampstead Shooting Club
- Coached by: Martin Barker
Medal record
Men's shooting
Representing the Isle of Man
Commonwealth Games
Silver medal – second place	2018 Gold Coast	Double trap
Bronze medal – third place	2010 Delhi	DT150
Representing Great Britain
World Championships
Silver medal – second place	2015 Lonato	DT150

Timothy Kneale (born 16 October 1982 in Douglas, Isle of Man) is a Manx sport shooter who specializes in the double trap. He is the current world record holder for the event, having scored 148 out of 150 at the 2014 ISSF World Cup meet in Munich, Germany. Apart from his world-record feat, Kneale has won two medals in a major international competition, a silver at the 2015 World Shotgun Championships and a bronze as a representative of the Isle of Man team at the 2010 Commonwealth Games in Delhi, India.

== Career ==
Born and raised in the Isle of Man, Kneale spent most of his childhood as a sporting enthusiast, representing the nation in cricket and also captaining the men's under-nineteen rugby team. After suffering a fractured leg which left him unable to play rugby at age eighteen, Kneale took up shooting more seriously, and eventually tried his hand at double trap. Although he began the sport, as a 16-year-old teen, in an international meet, Kneale set his shooting history as a member of the British national team in 2002. At that time, he helped his fellow shooters secure a bronze medal in a team event at the ISSF World Championships in Lahti, Finland.

Kneale's marksmanship prominence, however, did not occur until 2010, when he claimed his first individual double trap medal at the Commonwealth Games in Delhi, India, prevailing over 17-year-old junior world champion Asher Noria in a shoot-off 6–5 for the bronze.

At the 2014 ISSF World Cup meet held in Munich, Germany, Kneale attained a massive score of 148 out of 150 targets to establish a new world record for the men's double trap, but fell short to Jeffrey Holguin of the United States in a bronze-medal shoot-off 28–26. Following his tremendous world-record feat, Kneale had been given the honor to lead the Isle of Man delegation at the opening ceremony of the 2014 Commonwealth Games in Glasgow, Scotland. There, he finished twelfth in the double trap with 120 clay pigeons, and failed to advance to the final, missing a chance to improve on his third-place effort four years earlier.

The 2015 season witnessed a medal redemption for Kneale, as he earned a silver in the men's double trap at the World Shotgun Championships in Lonato, Italy, losing the title to Russia's Vasily Mosin in the gold medal match 26 clays to 29. With his runner-up finish, Kneale has been selected to represent Great Britain at his Olympic debut in Rio 2016.

Tim Kneale has won the Isle of Man's first medal at 2018 Commonwealth Games in Australia in the double trap shooting event. He finished with a score of 70 in the final - four targets behind Scotland's David McMath with India's Ankur Mittal third.
