= Ahmed Al Maktoum =

Ahmed Al Maktoum may refer to:

- Ahmed Al-Maktoum (sport shooter), Emirati sport shooter
- Ahmed bin Rashid Al Maktoum (born 1950), deputy chairman of Dubai Police & Public Security
- Ahmed bin Saeed Al Maktoum (born 1958), Emirati businessman
