= Angelos Spiropoulos =

Greek sport shooter

Personal information
- Full name: Angelos Spiropoulos
- Nationality: Greece
- Born: 15 June 1979 (age 47) Athens, Greece
- Height: 1.92 m (6 ft 3 1/2 in)
- Weight: 82 kg (181 lb)

Sport
- Sport: Shooting
- Event: Double trap (DT150)
- Club: Panellinios G.S.
- Coached by: Tom Alderin

Angelos Spiropoulos (Greek: Αγγελος Σπυρόπουλος; born 15 June 1979 in Athens) is a Greek sport shooter. He was chosen as one of the eleven shooters to represent Greece at the 2004 Summer Olympics held in Athens, and eventually won a silver medal in double trap shooting at the 2005 European Championships in Belgrade, Serbia and Montenegro. Spiropoulos is a member of the shooting team for Panellinios Gymnastikos Syllogos (English: Panellinios Gymnastics Club) in his native Athens, where he has trained under coach Tom Alderin throughout his sporting career.

Spiropoulos was selected as a member of the Greek shooting team to compete in the men's double trap at the 2004 Summer Olympics in Athens, earning his spot through one of the Olympic places reserved for the host nation in his event. Despite being relatively less experienced on the international scene, Spiropoulos displayed his skills admirably during the qualifying round, securing 124 hits out of 150. His performance earned him a twenty-second position out of twenty-five shooters in the field.
