= Steve Haberman =

Australian sports shooter (born 1963)

Personal information
- Full name: Stephen Thomas Haberman
- Nationality: Australia
- Born: 23 December 1963 (age 62) Geelong, Victoria, Australia
- Height: 1.76 m (5 ft 9 1/2 in)
- Weight: 85 kg (187 lb)

Sport
- Sport: Shooting
- Event: Double trap (DT150)
- Club: Echuca Ghil Target Club
- Coached by: Valeri Timokhin
Medal record
Men's shooting
Representing Australia
World Championships
Gold medal – first place	1995 Nicosia	DT150

Stephen Thomas "Steve" Haberman (born 23 December 1963 in Geelong) is an Australian sport shooter. He captured the men's double trap title at the 1995 ISSF World Shotgun Championships in Nicosia, and had the opportunity to represent Australia in two editions of the Olympic Games (1996 and 2004). Haberman currently trains for Echuca Ghil Target Club in his native Geelong, under Azerbaijani-born coach and three-time Olympic skeet shooter Valeri Timokhin.

Haberman's early success in the international competition came as a 32-year-old at the 1995 ISSF World Shotgun Championships in Nicosia, Cyprus, where he claimed the double trap title with 188 hits, leading to his selection to the Australian team for his Olympic debut. At the 1996 Summer Olympics in Atlanta, he shot 131 out of 150 hits to force a two-way tie with France's Marc Mennessier for seventeenth place in the inaugural men's double trap, which was eventually won by his teammate Russell Mark.

Although Haberman missed out on his selection bid for the host nation in Sydney 2000, he came back from an eight-year absence to compete for his second Australian team, as a 40-year-old in double trap shooting at the 2004 Summer Olympics in Athens. Few months before the Games, Haberman beat his former teammate Mark at the Olympic trials in Sydney to keep his own Olympic quota that he claimed from the Oceanian Championships a year earlier. With Mark's abrupt absence to the Aussie team, Haberman put up a lackluster performance by marking only a score of 129 hits out of 150 to obtain a fifteenth spot from a field of twenty-five shooters in the qualifying phase, failing to advance to the final round.
