= Li Jun (sport shooter) =

Chinese sport shooter (born 1985)

Personal information
- Nationality: China
- Born: 20 November 1985 (age 40) Shanghai, China
- Height: 1.82 m (5 ft 11 1/2 in)
- Weight: 76 kg (168 lb)

Sport
- Sport: Shooting
- Events: Trap, double trap
- Club: Shanghai Sports Club
- Coached by: Wang Lan
Medal record
Men's shooting
Representing China
World Championships
Gold medal – first place	2011 Belgrade	Double trap
Asian Championships
Silver medal – second place	2011 Kuala Lumpur	Double trap team

Li Jun (Chinese: 李 君; pinyin: Li Jūn; born November 20, 1985, in Shanghai) is a Chinese sport shooter. He won a gold medal in the men's double trap at the 2011 ISSF World Shotgun Championships, with a total score of 194 targets, earning him a spot on the Chinese team for the Olympics.

Li represented China at the 2012 Summer Olympics in London, where he competed in the men's double trap, along with his teammate and Olympic bronze medalist Hu Binyuan. He scored a total of 134 targets in the qualifying rounds, five points ahead of India's Ronjan Sodhi after the final attempt, finishing in tenth place.
