= Francesco D'Aniello =

Italian sport shooter (born 1969)

Personal information
- Nationality: Italian
- Born: 31 March 1969 (age 57) Nettuno, Italy

Sport
- Sport: Sports shooting
- Club: Fiamme Oro

Francesco D'Aniello (born 21 March 1969 in Nettuno) is an Italian trap shooter. At the 2008 Summer Olympics he won the silver medal in the men's double trap event. After realizing he had won silver, D'Aniello was overcome with emotion and collapsed to his knees weeping. He was less successful in the 2012 Summer Olympics, finishing 8th in the qualifying round and not qualifying for the final.

Current world records held in double trap
Men	Teams	424	Italy (Innocenti, Bernasconi, Gasparini); Italy (Barillà, Di Spigno, Gasparini)	August 3, 2013; September 14, 2014	Suhl (GER); Granada (ESP)
