= Roland Gerebics =

Hungarian sports shooter (born 1979)

Roland Gerebics (born 6 September 1979 in Várpalota) is a Hungarian sport shooter who specializes in the double trap.

At the 2000 Olympic Games he finished in fifth place. He then finished second at the 2001 and 2006 World Championships, and fourth at the 2006 European Championships.

At the 2008 Olympic Games he came in joint sixth place in the double trap qualification. Following a shoot-off he finished ninth, missing out on a place among the top six, who progressed to the final.

He resides in Sarlóspuszta.

Olympic results
Event	2000	2004	2008
Double trap	5th 140+40	—	9th 136
