= Ayman Mazhar =

Egyptian sports shooter

Personal information
- Nationality: Egyptian
- Born: 22 November 1959 (age 65)

Sport
- Sport: Sports shooting

Ayman Mazhar (born 22 November 1959) is an Egyptian sports shooter. He competed in the men's double trap event at the 2000 Summer Olympics.
