= Sean Nicholson =

Zimbabwean sport shooter (born 1973)

Personal information
- Full name: Michael Sean James Nicholson
- Nationality: Zimbabwe
- Born: 9 November 1973 (age 52) Harare, Rhodesia
- Height: 1.82 m (5 ft 11 1/2 in)
- Weight: 80 kg (176 lb)

Sport
- Sport: Shooting
- Event: Double trap (DT150)

Michael Sean James Nicholson (born 9 November 1973) is a Zimbabwean sport shooter. He claimed two silver medals in double trap shooting at the 2003 and 2007 African Championships, and was selected to compete for Zimbabwe at the 2004 Summer Olympics, finishing sixteenth in the process.

Nicholson qualified as a top shooter for the Zimbabwean squad in the men's double trap at the 2004 Summer Olympics in Athens, by having accepted an Olympic invitational berth from the International Shooting Sport Federation, based on his performance at the African Championships. He started with a score of 44 out of a possible 50 birds in the first round of the qualifying stage, but followed with 41 and 43 for a total of 128, which resulted in him finishing in sixteenth place.
