= Joonas Olkkonen =

Finnish sport shooter

Personal information
- Full name: Joonas Olkkonen
- Nationality: Finland
- Born: 19 February 1976 (age 50) Kärkölä, Finland
- Height: 1.84 m (6 ft 1/2 in)
- Weight: 93 kg (205 lb)

Sport
- Sport: Shooting
- Event: Double trap (DT150)
- Club: Lahden Ampumaseura
- Coached by: Kari Olin
Medal record
Men's shooting
Representing Finland
World Championships
Bronze medal – third place	2002 Lahti	DT150

Joonas Olkkonen (born 19 February 1976 in Kärkölä) is a Finnish sport shooter. He claimed the bronze medal in double trap shooting when his birthplace Lahti hosted the 2002 ISSF World Shooting Championships, and was selected to compete for Finland at the 2004 Summer Olympics, finishing last out of twenty-five prospective shooters. Having pursued the sport since the age of thirteen, Olkkonen trained full-time for Lahti Shooting Club (Finnish: Lahden Ampumaseura) in Lahti under his personal coach Kari Olin.

Olkkonen qualified for the Finnish squad in the men's double trap at the 2004 Summer Olympics in Athens, by having registered a minimum qualifying score of 140 and obtaining the bronze medal to ensure an Olympic slot from the World Championships two years earlier. Olkkonen fired 118 out of 150 birds to round out the leaderboard in last place from a field of twenty-five shooters, failing to advance to the final round.
