= Li Qingnian =

Chinese sports shooter

Medal record

Women's shooting

Representing China

Asian Championships
Gold medal – first place	2017 Astana	Trap team
Gold medal – first place	2023 Changwon	Trap team
Bronze medal – third place	2023 Changwon	Mixed trap team

Li Qingnian (Chinese: 李清念; pinyin: Lǐ Qīngniàn; born March 23, 1981, in Beijing) is a female Chinese sports shooter.

In the 2004 Summer Olympics, she finished fourth in the women's double trap competition. She also won the 2003 ISSF World Cup Final in Double Trap and defended her title in the next year's competition, becoming the last woman to win a World Cup title in this now non-Olympic event.

Current world records held in Double Trap
Women	Teams	328	China (Ding, Li, Zhang)	May 4, 2001	Cairo (EGY)
