= Mohammed Asab =

Indian sport shooter (born 1987)

Personal information
- Nationality: Indian
- Born: 10 September 1987 (age 38) Meerut, Uttar Pradesh, India
- Height: 168 cm (5 ft 6 in) (2014)
- Weight: 72 kg (159 lb) (2014)
- Spouse: Sumbul Rizvi (m. 2016)

Sport
- Country: India
- Sport: Shooting
- Event: Double trap
Medal record
Men's shooting
Representing India
World Championships
Bronze medal – third place	SOUTH KOREA, 2018	DT
Bronze medal – third place	ITALY, 2015	DT
Gold medal – first place	GERMANY, 2007	DT
Silver medal – second place	GERMANY, 2007	DT
Bronze medal – third place	GERMANY, 2006	DT
Commonwealth Games
Bronze medal – third place	SCOTLAND, 2014	DT
Commonwealth Shooting Championships
Gold medal – first place	NEW DELHI, 2010	DT
Silver medal – second place	NEW DELHI, 2010	DT
ISSF World Cup
Bronze medal – third place	CYPRUS, 2015	DT
Gold medal – first place	NEW DELHI, 2003	DT
Asian Championship
Gold medal – first place	KAZAKHSTAN, 2017	DT
Bronze medal – third place	UAE, 2014	DT
Bronze medal – third place	UAE, 2014	DT
Bronze medal – third place	QATAR, 2014	DT
Bronze medal – third place	QATAR, 2012	DT
Bronze medal – third place	MALAYSIA, 2011	DT
Gold medal – first place	KUWAIT, 2007	DT
Silver medal – second place	KUWAIT, 2007	DT
Asian Olympic Shooting Qualifying Tournament
Bronze medal – third place	NEW DELHI, 2016	DT
MALAYSIAN OPEN SHOTGUN CHAMPIONSHIP
Gold medal – first place	MALAYSIA,2011	DT
National Shooting Championship
Gold medal – first place	66th NSCC, 2023	DT
Silver medal – second place	66th NSCC, 2023	Team Double trap
Bronze medal – third place	65th NSCC, 2022	Team Double trap
Gold medal – first place	64th NSCC, 2021	DT
Gold medal – first place	64th NSCC, 2021	Team Double trap
Gold medal – first place	62nd NSCC, 2018	DT
Gold medal – first place	62nd NSCC, 2018	Team Double trap
Bronze medal – third place	61st NSCC, 2017	DT
Gold medal – first place	61st NSCC, 2017	Team Double trap
Gold medal – first place	60th NSCC, 2016	Team Double trap
Gold medal – first place	59th NSCC, 2015	DT
Silver medal – second place	59th NSCC, 2015	Team Double trap
Bronze medal – third place	58th NSCC,2014	DT
Bronze medal – third place	57th NSCC, 2013	DT
Silver medal – second place	56th NSCC, 2012	DT
Bronze medal – third place	54th NSCC, 2011	Team Double trap
Bronze medal – third place	54th NSCC,2011	DT
Bronze medal – third place	51st NSCC, 2007	DT
Gold medal – first place	51st NSCC, 2007	DT
Gold medal – first place	50th NSCC, 2006	DT
Gold medal – first place	49th NSCC, 2005	DT
Gold medal – first place	48th NSCC, 2004	Team Double trap
Gold medal – first place	48th NSCC, 2004	DT
Bronze medal – third place	47th NSCC, 2003	Team Double trap
Gold medal – first place	47th NSCC, 2003	DT
Gold medal – first place	46th NSCC, 2002	Team Double trap
Gold medal – first place	46th NSCC, 2002	DT
Silver medal – second place	45th NSCC, 2002	Team Double trap
Gold medal – first place	45th NSCC, 2002	DT

Mohammed Asab (born 10 September 1987) is an Indian shooter who competes in the double trap event. In the same event, he won the bronze medal at the 2014 Commonwealth Games in Glasgow, Scotland.and missed his 2nd commonwealth medal at the 2018 Commonwealth Games in Gold Coast, Australia, where he secure 4th rank. medals. He also participated at the ISSF World Shooting Championships, Commonwealth Shooting Championships, World Cup, Asian Championship and won medals. He hold a world record at the ISSF World Cup in Acapulco, Mexico.

== Early life ==
His early life was spent in Amroli (Bada Gaon), a small village in Meerut, India. Asab is belong to the shooter's family, His elder brother is a coach in the Indian Army and one brother plays on behalf of the Indian Air Force.

== Awards and recognitions ==
- 2016- Laxman Award (Highest Sporting Honour of Uttar Pradesh)
- 2016- Nominee of Arjuna Award (Highest Sporting Honour of India)
