= Dominic Grazioli =

American sport shooter

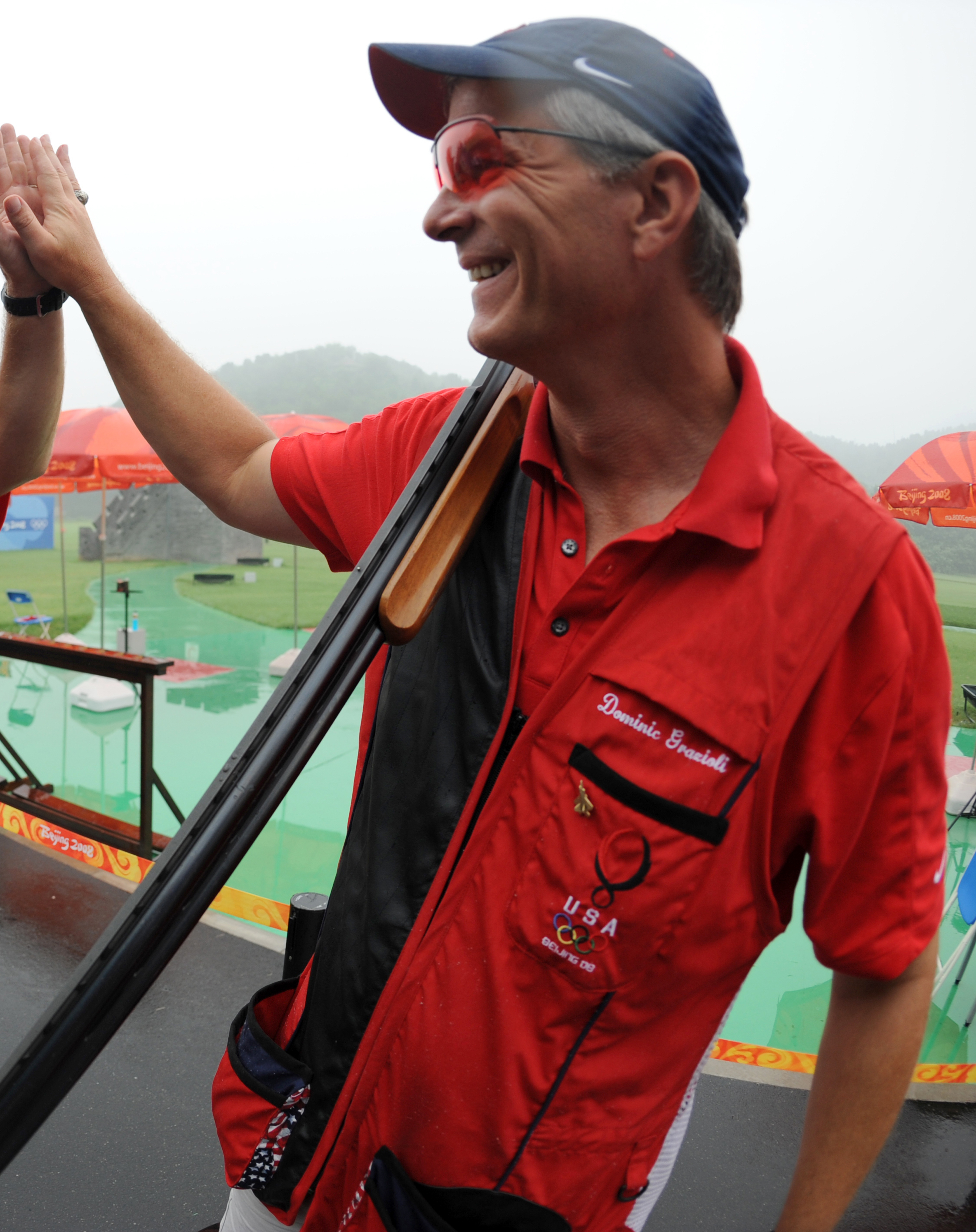
- Grazioli at the 2008 Summer Olympics

Personal information
- Full name: Dominic P. Grazioli
- Nickname: Dom
- Born: February 4, 1964 (age 62) Myrtle Beach, South Carolina, U.S.
- Home town: San Antonio, Texas, U.S.
- Height: 6 ft 3 in (1.91 m)
- Weight: 249 lb (113 kg)

Sport
- Country: United States
- Sport: Shooting
- Event: Trap
Medal record
World Shooting Championships
| Silver medal – second place | 1998 Barcelona | Trap team |
| Bronze medal – third place | 1999 Tampere | Trap team |

Dominic P. Grazioli (born February 4, 1964) is an American trap shooter. He won a total of ten medals (4 gold, 2 silver, and 4 bronze) for men's trap shooting at the ISSF World Cup. He also captured a silver medal at the 1997 Championship of the Americas in Buenos Aires, Argentina, and achieved a fourth-place finish at the 1999 ISSF World Shooting Championships in Tampere, Finland. Additionally, Grazioli retired as a reserve lieutenant colonel in the U.S. Air Force at Randolph Air Force Base in San Antonio, Texas.

Grazioli qualified for the men's trap shooting at the 2008 Summer Olympics in Beijing, by placing second from the U.S. Olympic Team Trials for Shotgun in Kerrville, Texas. He finished in twenty-third place by four points behind his teammate Bret Erickson from the fourth attempt, for a total score of 113 targets.
