= Matthew French (sport shooter) =

English sport shooter

Personal information
- Nationality: United Kingdom
- Born: 8 July 1981 (age 44) Oxford, England
- Height: 6 ft 0 in (183 cm)
- Weight: 80 kg (180 lb)

Sport
- Country: England
- Sport: Sport shooter
Medal record
Representing England
Men's shooting
Commonwealth Games
Silver medal – second place	2014 Glasgow	Double trap
Commonwealth Championships
Silver medal – second place	2017 Brisbane	Double trap
- Updated on 8 November 2017

Matthew French (born 8 July 1981) is a British sport shooter. He competed for England in the double trap event at the 2014 Commonwealth Games where he won a silver medal.
