= Zhang Yafei =

Chinese sports shooter (born 1970)

Medal record

Women's shooting

Representing China

Asian Championships
Silver medal – second place	2009 Almaty	Double trap

Zhang Yafei (Chinese: 张亚菲; pinyin: Zhāng Yàfēi; born 15 September 1970) is a Chinese sport shooter who competed in the 2000 Summer Olympics.

Current world records held in Double Trap
Women	Individual	115	Zhang Yafei (CHN)	October 20, 2000	Nicosia (CYP)
Women	Teams	328	China (Ding, Li, Zhang)	May 4, 2001	Cairo (EGY)
