= Wang Zheng (sport shooter) =

Chinese sport shooter

Medal record

Men's shooting

Representing China

Olympic Games
Bronze medal – third place	2004 Athens	Double trap

Asian Championships
Gold medal – first place	2007 Kuwait City	Double trap team
Bronze medal – third place	2007 Kuwait City	Double trap

Wang Zheng (Chinese: 王正; pinyin: Wáng Zhèng; born April 28, 1979, in Jiangsu) is a male Chinese sports shooter. He competed in the 2004 Summer Olympics.

He won the bronze medal in the men's double trap competition.

Wang became part of the Chinese national shooting team in 2001.
