= Ahmad bin Mohammad Al Maktoum =

Sport shooter and Emirati Royal family member

Sheikh Ahmad bin Mohammad bin Hasher Al Maktoum
- Born: 18 February 1963 (age 63); Dubai, Emirate of Dubai, Trucial States (present day United Arab Emirates)
- Citizenship: Emirati
- House: Al Maktoum
- Father: Mohammad bin Hasher Al Maktoum
- Mother: Maitha bint Abdullah Al Falasi
- Sports career
- Country: United Arab Emirates
- Sport: Sport shooting
- Events: Trap, double trap
Medal record
Men's shooting
Representing United Arab Emirates
Olympic Games
Gold medal – first place	2004 Athens	Double trap

Sheikh Ahmad bin Mohammad bin Hasher Al Maktoum (أحمد بن محمد بن حشر آل مكتوم) (born 18 February 1963) is an Emirati sports shooter who won the first ever Olympic medal for his country.

== Sport career ==
At the 2004 Summer Olympics, he won the double trap event and finished fourth in the trap event.

At the 2005 ISSF World Cup, he won another gold medal in double trap.

He competed at the 2008 Summer Olympics, but did not reach the final in trap.

He subsequently began coaching young British shooter Peter Wilson, who would win the double trap event at the 2012 London Olympics.

Olympic results
Event	2000	2004	2008
Trap	18th 111	4th 121+23	30th 110
Double trap	23rd 120	(gold) Gold; 144+45	7th 136
