= Mirco Cenci =

Italian sports shooter

Personal information
- Nationality: Italian
- Born: 8 October 1957 (age 67); Perugia, Italy

Sport
- Sport: Sports shooting

Mirco Cenci (born 8 October 1957) is an Italian sports shooter. He competed in the men's double trap event at the 1996 Summer Olympics.
