= Håkan Dahlby =

Swedish sport shooter (born 1965)

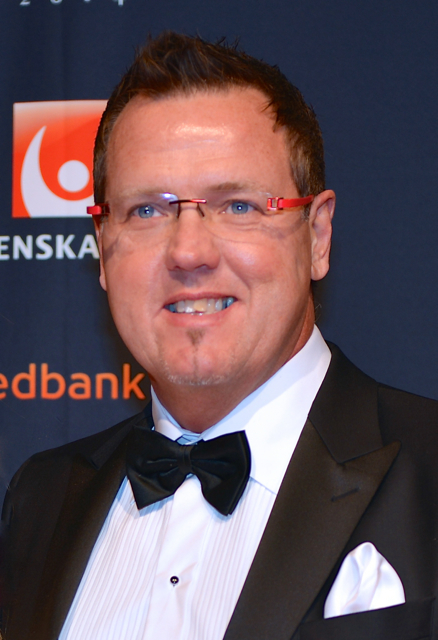
- Dahlby at the 2014 Swedish Sports Awards

Personal information
- Born: 15 September 1965 (age 60)
Medal record
Representing Sweden
Shooting
Olympic Games
Silver medal – second place	2012 London	Double trap

Håkan Dahlby (born 15 September 1965) is a Swedish double trap shooter, the winner of the 2003, 2004, and 2012 European Championships. He won a silver medal at the 2012 Olympics after having the best final round of all finalists and moving from fifth to second place. In the 2004 Olympics he finished second in the qualification round, but dropped to fifth place during the final round. Since then, he has won the 2005 ISSF World Cup Final, the 2008 ISSF World Cup Final, and ISSF World Cup competitions in 2007 and 2008, but failed to reach the final at the 2008 Olympics. Dahlby lives in Stockholm.

Dahlby was a contestant in Let's Dance 2013.
