= Irina Laricheva (shooter) =

Russian trap shooter (1964–2020)

Personal information
- Born: 19 November 1964 Moscow, Russia
- Died: 29 January 2020 (aged 55)
- Height: 1.68 m (5 ft 6 in)
- Weight: 72 kg (159 lb)

Sport
- Sport: Trap shooting
- Club: CSKA
Medal record
Representing Soviet Union
World Championships
Gold medal – first place	1990 Moscow	Team double trap
Silver medal – second place	1990 Moscow	Team trap
Representing Russia
World Championships
Gold medal – first place	1994 Fagnano	Team double trap
Gold medal – first place	2001 Cairo	Team trap
Gold medal – first place	2001 Cairo	Individual trap
Gold medal – first place	2002 Lahti	Team trap
Gold medal – first place	2006 Zagreb	Team trap
Silver medal – second place	2005 Lonato	Individual trap
Silver medal – second place	2009 Maribor	Individual shotgun
Silver medal – second place	2009 Maribor	Individual trap
Bronze medal – third place	1997 Lima	Team trap
Bronze medal – third place	1997 Lima	Team trap
World Cup
Gold medal – first place	2008 Minsk	Individual trap

Irina Yuryevna Laricheva (Russian: Ирина Юрьевна Ларичева; 19 November 1964 – 29 January 2020) was a Russian trap shooter. She competed at the 2004 and 2008 Summer Olympics and finished in 13th and 9th place, respectively. She won multiple medals at the world championships in the individual and team trap, double trap and shotgun events. At European trap championships, she won a gold medal in the team competition in 1997, an individual gold medal in 1999, and two individual bronze medals in 1998 and 2000. She graduated from a Moscow medical school and lived in Moscow. She was married and has a son, Stanislav, and a daughter Olesya.
