= Riitta-Mari Murtoniemi =

Finnish sport shooter

Riitta-Mari Murtoniemi (born 3 March 1966 in Myrskylä) is a Finnish sport shooter. She competed at the 1996 Summer Olympics in the women's double trap event, in which she placed fifth.
