= Bing Zhang =

Chinese astrophysicist

- Born: Shanxi Province, China
- Education: Peking University
- Known for: Gamma ray bursts Fast Radio Bursts
- Awards: Fellow, American Physical Society
- Scientific career
- Fields: Astrophysics
- Workplaces: University of Nevada, Las Vegas

Bing Zhang is a Chinese astrophysicist and professor at the University of Nevada, Las Vegas. He is best known for his research in gamma-ray bursts, fast radio bursts, and other high-energy astrophysical phenomena. He is the author of the book The Physics of Gamma-Ray Bursts.

== Life ==
Bing Zhang was born in 1968 in Shanxi, China. He received his B.S. (1991), M.S. (1994), and Ph.D. (1997) from Peking University. After postdoctoral fellowships at NASA Goddard Space Flight Center and Pennsylvania State University, he joined the University of Nevada, Las Vegas in 2004 where he holds a tenured faculty position.

== Career ==
Zhang is a theoretical astrophysicist works closely with observers. According to the Astrophysics Data System, he has published more than 800 papers, including more than 500 refereed papers as of 2023, with a citation h-index greater than 100. He is known for his theoretical work on several subjects in the field of gamma-ray bursts (GRBs): e.g., a canonical afterglow lightcurve and interpretation, a prompt emission model invoking internal collision-induced magnetic reconnection, a magnetar central engine, a quasi-universal structured jet, a physical classification scheme, among others. His work has been found useful in interpreting the rapidly growing body of GRB data, and several of his predictions have been verified by observations. Together with Peter Mészáros and Pawan Kumar, Zhang wrote two influential review articles in the GRB field. He also wrote a comprehensive, 579-page book on the physics of GRBs, which serves as an advanced textbook for graduate students and as a reference for researchers in the field of GRBs.

Zhang has participated in a number of observational campaigns in collaboration with observers. Discoveries to which Zhang contributed include: discovery of the first short GRB afterglow, discovery of X-ray flares following GRBs, discovery of the first jetted tidal disruption event, discovery of an X-ray transient marking the birth of a magnetar, and making a connection between fast radio bursts and a Galactic magnetar.

Zhang is an advocate of using Breakthrough Starshot techniques to study "relativistic astronomy". He also suggested that communicative extraterrestrial intelligence (CETI) may use fast radio burst-like signals to communicate, and that one can use all-sky radio monitors to place quantitative constraints on the signal emission rate of CETI.

== Positions ==
Zhang is an elected Fellow of the American Physical Society (2014). He served as Associate Dean for Research of the College of Sciences in 2018–2021, and holds the position of Distinguished Professor in the Department of Physics and Astronomy, as well as Founding Director of the Nevada Center for Astrophysics at the University of Nevada, Las Vegas.

== Awards and accomplishments ==
- 2020 – "Top Ten Breakthrough of the Year" selected by Science and "Ten Remarkable Discoveries from 2020" selected by Nature.
- 2014 – Fellow, American Physical Society.
- 2009 – Thomson Reuters scienceWATCH: highly cited author list in the field of gamma-ray bursts during 1999–2009.
- 2007 – Bruno Rossi Prize (shared with Neil Gehrels and the Swift team).
- 2007 – First author of the "New Hot Paper" in the field of Space Science identified by Essential Science Indicators in July 2007.
- 2005 – "Top Ten Breakthrough of the Year" selected by Science.
- 1998 – National Research Council (NRC) Research Associate Fellowship.

== Personal life ==
Zhang is married to Chaohui Huang and has two children.
