= David Alcoriza =

American sports shooter

Personal information
- Born: October 13, 1968 (age 57) Columbus, Georgia, United States

Sport
- Sport: Sports shooting

David Alcoriza (born October 13, 1968) is an American sports shooter. He competed in the men's double trap event at the 1996 Summer Olympics.

Alcoriza also competed in the United States Army Marksmanship Unit for eight years and, after his shooting career, coached basketball in Tokay, California.
