= Jiří Gach =

Czech sport shooter

Personal information
- Nationality: Czech
- Born: 4 August 1969 (age 57) Zlín, Czechoslovakia

Sport
- Sport: Sport shooting

Jiří Gach (born 4 August 1969) is a Czech sport shooter. He competed at the 1996 Summer Olympics and the 2000 Summer Olympics.
