= Jean-Paul Gros =

French sport shooter

Jean-Paul Gros (born 10 December 1960 in Saint-Symphorien-d'Ozon) is a French former sport shooter who competed in the 1992 Summer Olympics, in the 1996 Summer Olympics, and in the 2000 Summer Olympics.
