= Steven Scott =

British shooter (born 1985)

Medal record

Representing Great Britain
Bronze medal – third place	2016 Rio de Janeiro	Double trap

World Championships
Bronze medal – third place	2014 Granada	Double trap

European Championships
Gold medal – first place	2014 Sarlóspuszta	Double trap
Gold medal – first place	2015 Maribor	Double trap team
Gold medal – first place	2016 Lonato del Garda	Double trap team
Gold medal – first place	2023 Osijek	Trap team
Silver medal – second place	2012 Larnaca	Double trap
Silver medal – second place	2012 Larnaca	Double trap team
Silver medal – second place	2014 Sarlóspuszta	Double trap team

Representing England

Commonwealth Games
Gold medal – first place	2010 Delhi	Double trap pairs
Gold medal – first place	2014 Glasgow	Double trap

Steven "Steve" Scott (born 10 January 1985) is a British Olympic shooter. He won a Bronze medal in the Men's Double Trap at the 2016 Olympic Games. He has won two gold medals in the same event at the Commonwealth Games.

Scott was born in Lewisham, and lives in Battle, East Sussex.

== Sporting career ==
Scott was selected to represent England at the 2010 Commonwealth Games in Delhi. With Stevan Walton, he won the men's double trap pairs event.

In June 2014 at the European Championships he became European Double Trap Champion. He was selected to represent England again at the 2014 Commonwealth Games in Glasgow, winning the individual Double Trap event. In September he went on to win Bronze at the World Championships.

Scott was selected to represent Team GB at the 2016 Olympic Games in Rio de Janeiro. He won Bronze in the Double Trap.
