= Conny Persson =

Swedish sports shooter

Conny Persson (born 13 January 1968, in Höör) is a Swedish former sport shooter who competed in the 2000 Summer Olympics.
