= Jeffrey Holguin =

American sport shooter

Jeff Holguin
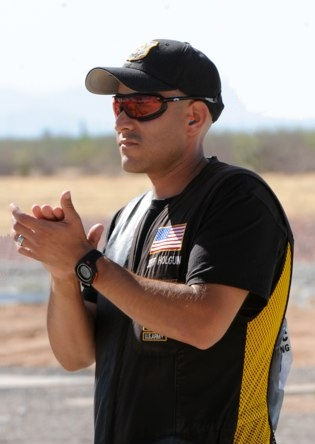
- Holguin in 2012

Personal information
- Born: October 24, 1978 (age 47) Fullerton, California, United States
- Height: 1.75 m (5 ft 9 in)
- Weight: 82 kg (181 lb)

Sport
- Country: United States
- Sport: Shooting
- Club: U.S. Army
Medal record
Representing United States
Pan American Games
Gold medal – first place	2003 Santo Domingo	Double trap
Silver medal – second place	2007 Rio de Janeiro	Double trap

Jeffrey G. "Jeff" Holguin (born October 24, 1978) is an American sport shooter. He placed fourth in the double trap at the 2008 Summer Olympics.
