= Li Bo (sport shooter) =

Chinese sports shooter (born 1970)

Personal information
- Nationality: Chinese
- Born: 27 June 1970 (age 56)

Sport
- Sport: Sports shooting

Li Bo (born 27 June 1970) is a Chinese sports shooter. He competed at the 1996 Summer Olympics and the 2000 Summer Olympics.
