= Adam Vella =

Australian sport shooter

Medal record

Men's shooting

Representing Australia

Olympic Games
Bronze medal – third place	2004 Athens	Trap

Commonwealth Games
Gold medal – first place	2002 Manchester	Trap pairs
Gold medal – first place	2006 Melbourne	Trap pairs
Gold medal – first place	2010 Dehli	Trap pairs
Gold medal – first place	2014 Glasgow	Trap
Silver medal – second place	2002 Manchester	Trap

Adam Joseph Vella (born 12 June 1971) is the National Shotgun Coach of the Australian Team. He is a former Australian olympic clay target shooting champion. Vella was born in Melbourne and is a Commonwealth Games four times gold medalist and an Olympic bronze medalist.

Adam Vella is the only shooter who has ever ranked #1 in the World at the same time in Trap and Double Trap.

Despite being the No 1 ranked shooter in the world in 2007, Adam missed on the selection to the 2008 Olympics. His international performances were not taken into consideration as per the AISL Olympic selection criteria and the position was won by Craig Henwood after beating Adam by 1 target.

Adam Vella represented Australia in 2016, his third Olympics.

Adam Vella retired from professional Shooting and since December 2016 he has been appointed by Shooting Australia as the National High Performance Shotgun Coach.

Adam Vella also conducts clay target shooting events through his business Oz Shooting.
