= Vitaly Fokeev =

Russian sport shooter (born 1974)

Personal information
- Full name: Vitaly Vitalyevich Fokeev
- Born: 15 February 1974 (age 52) Rostov-on-Don, RSFSR, Soviet Union
Medal record
Men's shooting
European Games
| Gold medal – first place | 2015 Baku | Double Trap |
ISSF World Championships
| Gold medal – first place | 2006 Zagreb | Double Trap |
| Gold medal – first place | 2017 Moscow | Double Trap |
| Bronze medal – third place | 2006 Zagreb | Double Trap (Team) |
| Bronze medal – third place | 2017 Moscow | Double Trap (Team) |
European Championships
| Silver medal – second place | 2007 Granada | Double Trap |

Vitaly Vitalyevich Fokeev (Russian: Виталий Витальевич Фокеев; born 15 February 1974 in Rostov-on-Don) is a Russian former sport shooter who specialized in the double trap.

Fokeev was born in Rostov-on-Don, RSFSR, Soviet Union. At the 2004 Olympic Games he finished in joint 9th place in the double trap qualification. Following a shoot-off he finished tenth, missing out on a place among the top six, who progressed to the final round.

He then finished sixth at the 2005 World Championships, won the 2006 World Championships and finished second at the 2007 European Championships. At the 2008 Olympic Games he finished in sixteenth place in the double trap qualification, missing a place among the top six, who progressed to the final round.

At the 2012 Summer Olympics, he reached the men's double trap final, finishing in 5th place.
