= Vasily Mosin =

Russian sport shooter (born 1972)

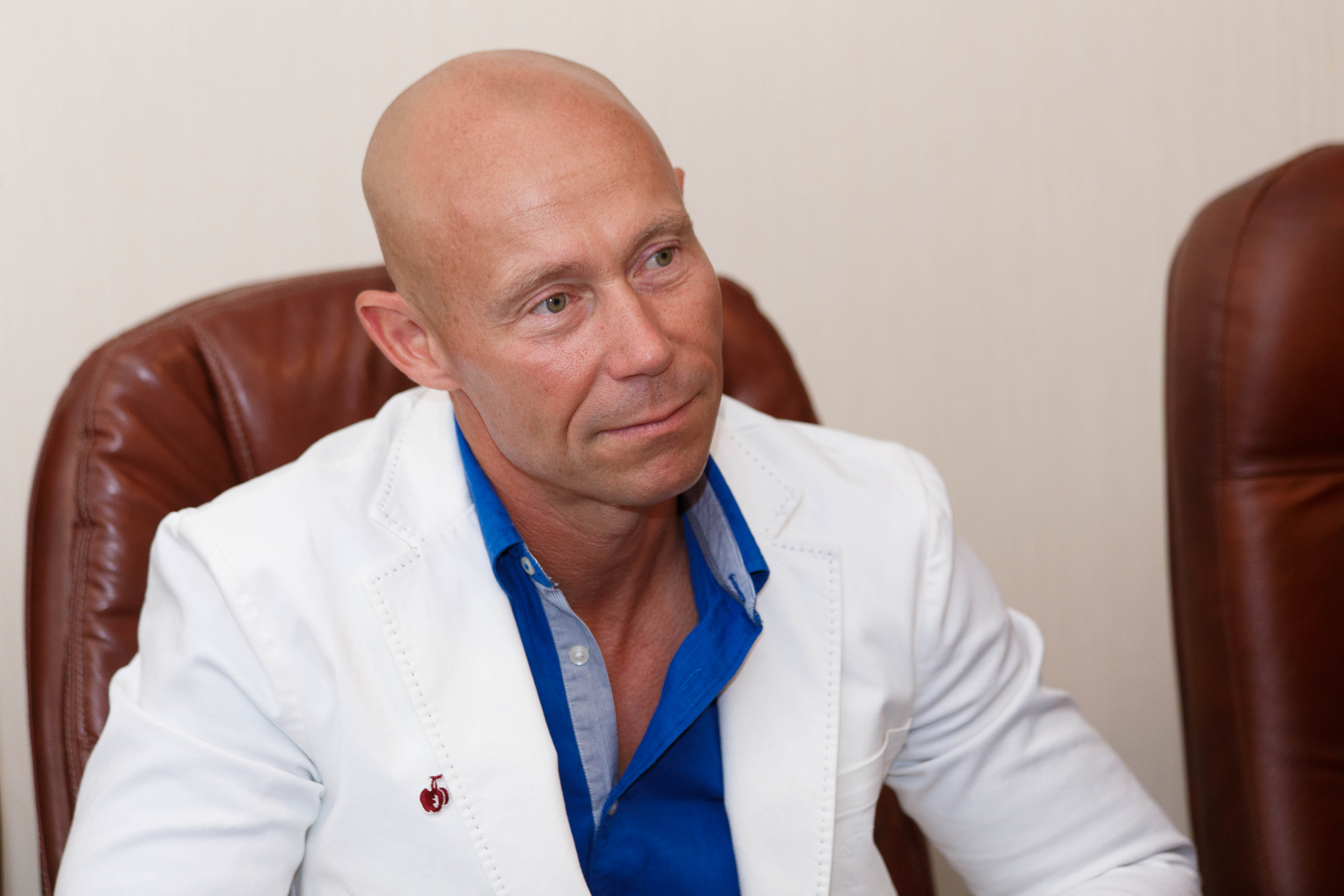

Personal information
- Born: May 9, 1972 (age 54) Kazan, Tatar ASSR, Russian SFSR, Soviet Union
Medal record
Representing Russia
Shooting
Olympic Games
| Bronze medal – third place | 2012 London | Double trap |
ISSF World Championships
| Gold medal – first place | 2015 Lonato | Double trap |
| Silver medal – second place | 2013 Lima | Double trap |
| Silver medal – second place | 2010 Munich | Double trap |
ISSF World Cup
| Gold medal – first place | 2015 Al Ain | Double trap |
| Gold medal – first place | 2013 Nicosia | Double trap |
| Gold medal – first place | 2008 Beijing | Double trap |
| Gold medal – first place | 2006 Kerrville | Double trap |
| Gold medal – first place | 2005 Americana | Double trap |

Vasily Alexandrovich Mosin (Russian: Василий Александрович Мосин; born 9 May 1972, in Kazan) is a Russian sport shooter who specializes in the double trap.

At the 2004 Olympic Games he finished in nineteenth place in the double trap qualification, missing out on a place among the top six, who progressed to the final round.

He then finished third at the 2005 European Championships and won the 2006 European Championships. At the 2008 Olympic Games he finished in fourteenth place in the double trap qualification, missing a place among the top six, who progressed to the final round.

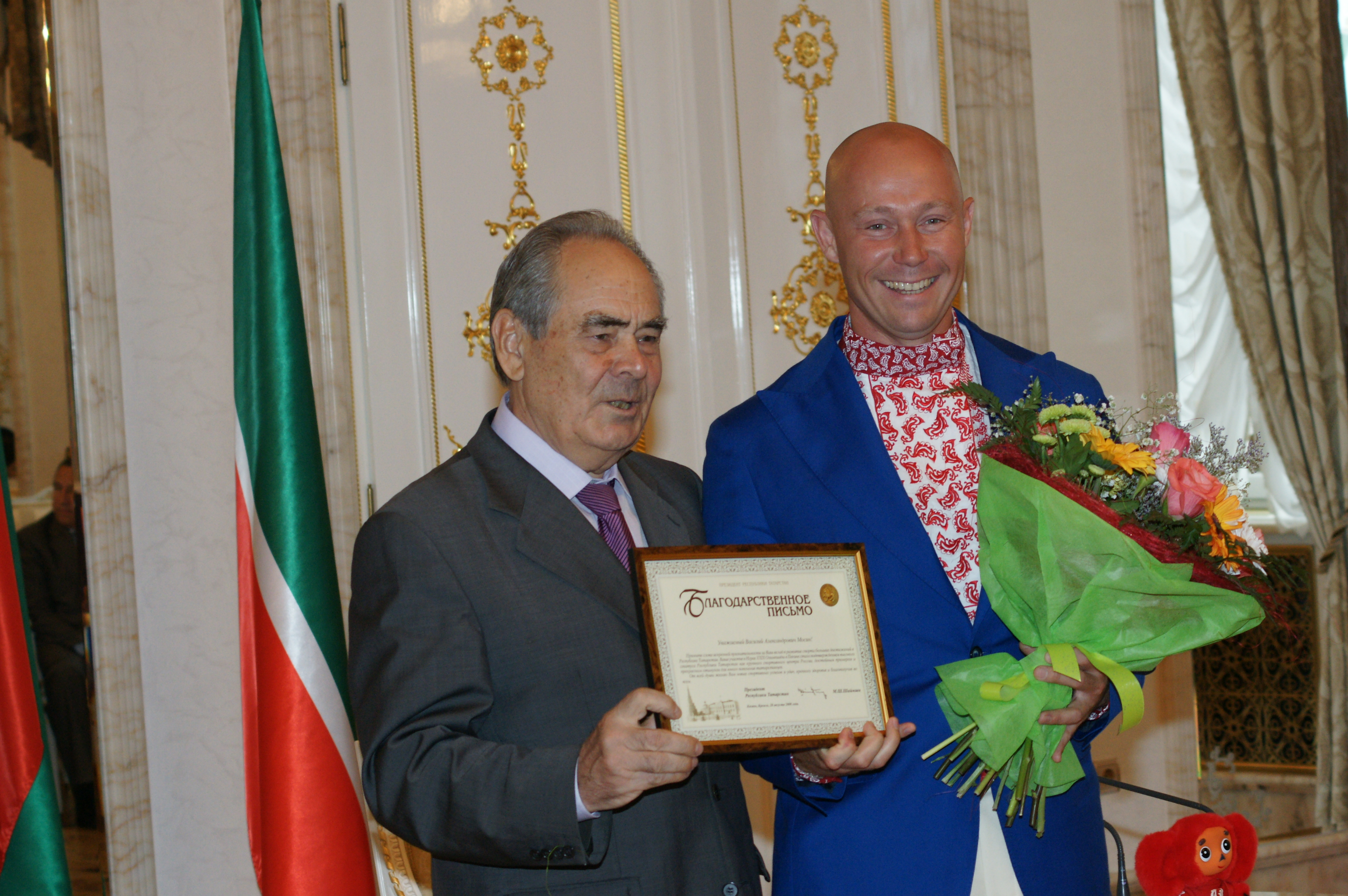
Shaimiev (president of Tatarstan) with Russian Olympic Team (2008)

In the 2012 Olympics, he finished third in double trap, earning a bronze medal.
