= William Keever =

American sports shooter

Personal information
- Born: March 14, 1976 (age 50) Rutherfordton, North Carolina, United States

Sport
- Sport: Sport shooting
Medal record
Representing United States
Pan American Games
Silver medal – second place	2003 Santo Domingo	Double trap

William Howell "Bill" Keever (born March 14, 1976) is an American former sport shooter who competed in the 2000 Summer Olympics.
