= Bret Erickson =

American sports shooter

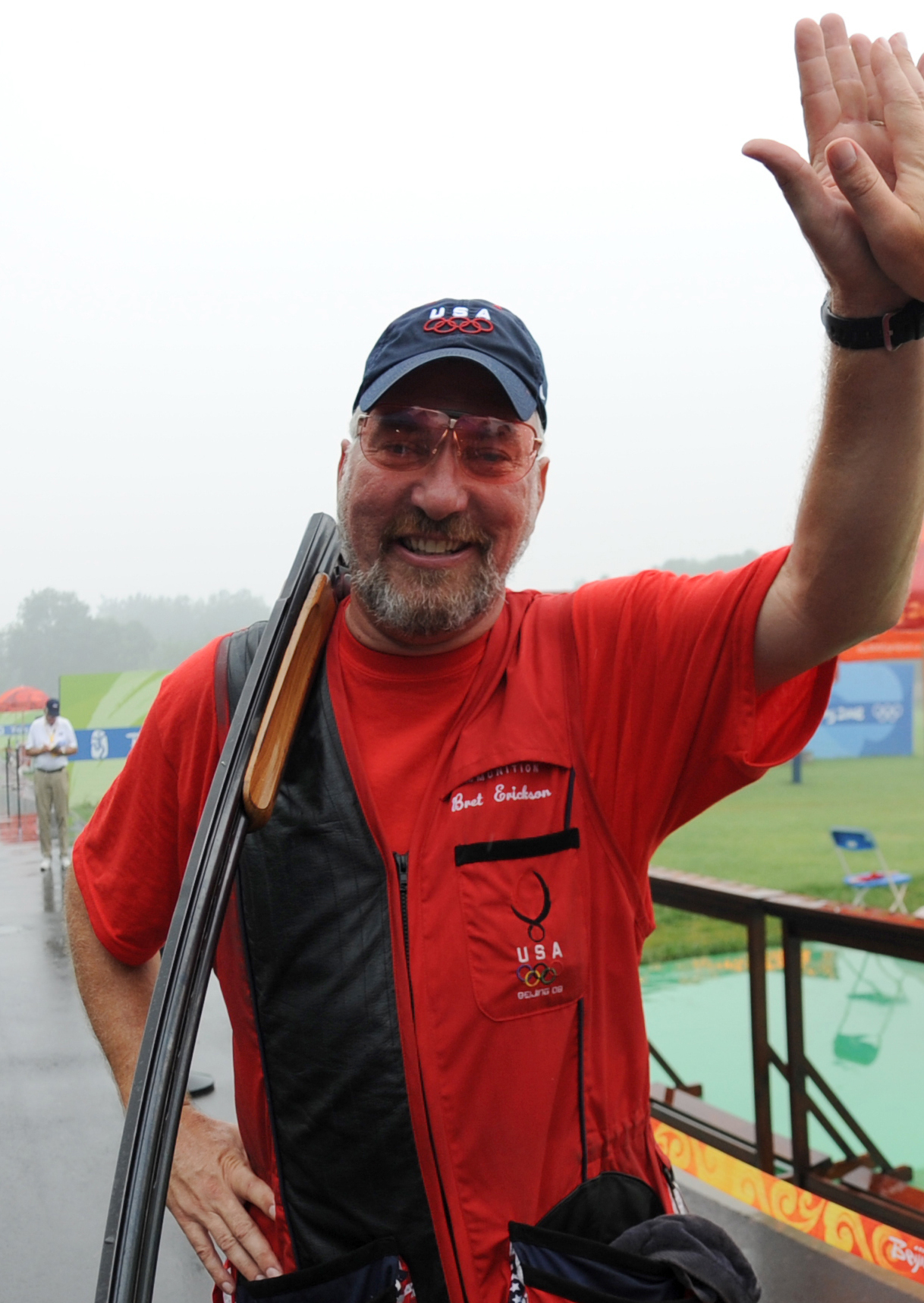
- Erickson at the 2008 Summer Olympics

Personal information
- Born: September 26, 1960 (age 65) Blair, Nebraska, United States

Sport
- Sport: Sport shooting
Medal record
Representing United States
Pan American Games
Gold medal – first place	1995 Mar del Plata	Trap team
Silver medal – second place	1995 Mar del Plata	Trap
Silver medal – second place	2007 Rio de Janeiro	Trap

Bret E. Erickson (born September 26, 1960) is an American sport shooter who competed in the 1992 Summer Olympics, in the 1996 Summer Olympics, in the 2004 Summer Olympics, and in the 2008 Summer Olympics.
