= Waldemar Schanz =

German sports shooter

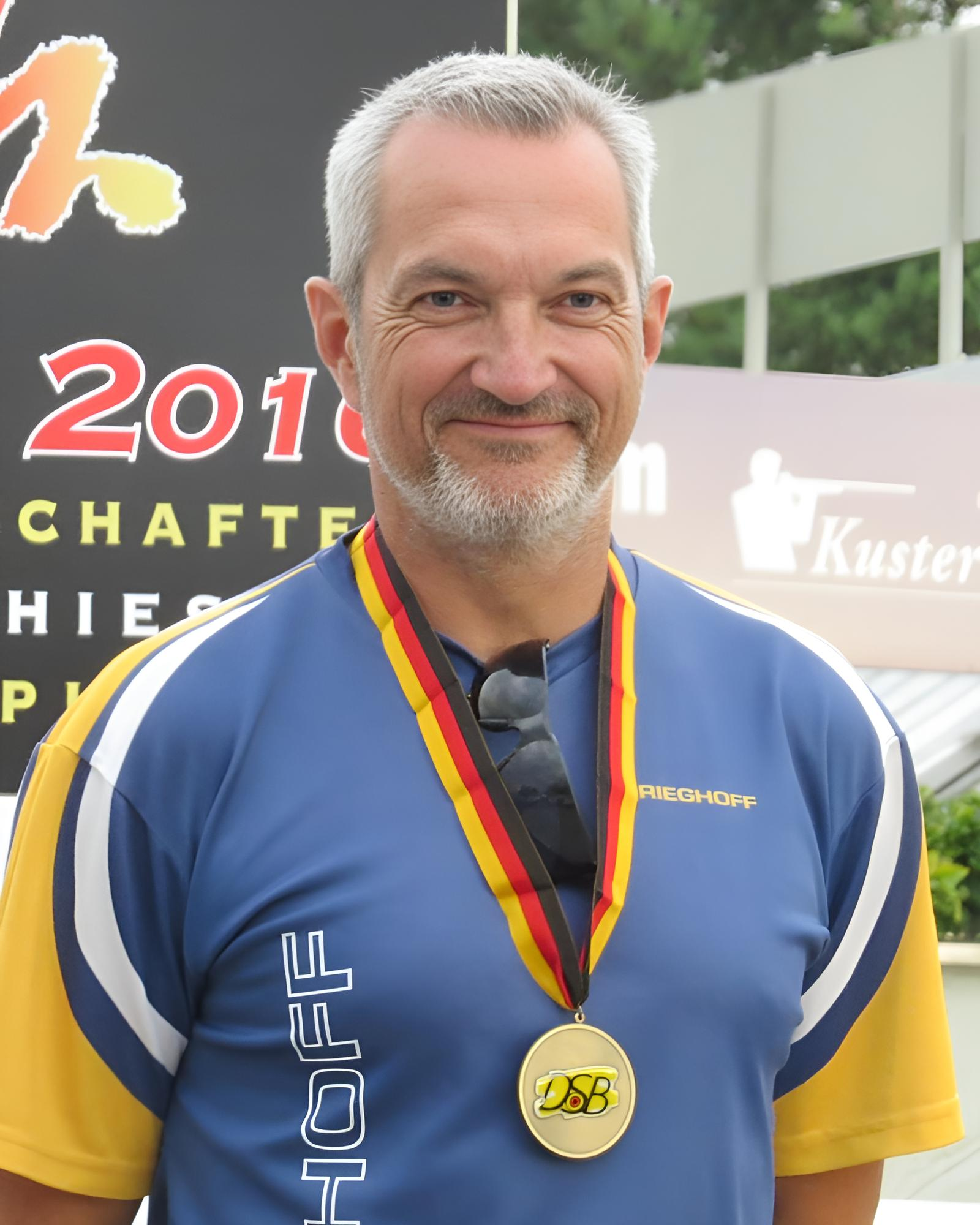
Waldemar Schanz

Waldemar Schanz (born 9 August 1968) is a German sport shooter who competed in the 1996 Summer Olympics, in the 2000 Summer Olympics, and in the 2004 Summer Olympics.
