= Russell Mark =

Australian sport shooter (born 1964)

Personal information
- Full name: Russell Andrew Mark
- Nationality: Australian
- Born: 25 February 1964 (age 62) Ballarat, Victoria, Australia
- Spouse: Lauryn Mark

Sport
- Sport: Shooting
Medal record
Representing Australia
Men's shooting
Olympic Games
Gold medal – first place	1996 Atlanta	Double trap
Silver medal – second place	2000 Sydney	Double trap
Commonwealth Games
Bronze medal – third place	1990 Auckland	Men's Trap - Pairs
Silver medal – second place	2002 Manchester	Double trap
Silver medal – second place	2002 Manchester	Double trap - Pairs
Gold medal – first place	2006 Melbourne	Double trap - Pairs
Silver medal – second place	2006 Melbourne	Double trap
Bronze medal – third place	2010 Delhi	Double trap

Russell Andrew Mark, OAM (born 25 February 1964) is an Australian Olympic Champion and World Champion marksman.

In August 2024 he commenced employment with the International Shooting Sports Federation (ISSF) to lecture, critique and examine their prospective ‘A’ Class instructors through the ISSF Coaching Academy. Russell Mark is also the co-founder, with his wife Lauryn Mark, of the successful clay target shooting coaching company, “Go Shooting Pty Ltd”, that produced over one hundred instructional video tutorials for their popular YouTube channel.

Mark is a former World and Olympic Record holder and held the world number one ranking on multiple occasions. He won the gold medal in the Double Trap event at the 1996 Summer Olympics in Atlanta. He also won a silver medal at the 2000 Summer Olympics in Sydney. Mark competed at six Olympic Games: 1988 (Trap), 1992 (Trap), 1996 (Trap and Double Trap), 2000 (Trap and Double Trap), 2008 (Double Trap), 2012 (Double Trap). The only Australian Summer Olympian to compete in more Olympiads is Andrew Hoy (seven).

His win at the Atlanta 1996 Summer Olympics gave him the distinction of being the world's inaugural shotgun competitor to win an individual gold medal in all four of the major International Shooting Sports Federation (ISSF) titles; the World Cup, the World Cup Final, the World Championship and the Olympic Games. Uniquely after the Sydney 2000 Summer Olympics, he also has a complete set of silver medals from all four of the world's major championships. This is an honour he solely shares with the legendary American female clay target shooter and six time Olympic medalist, Kimberley Rhode.

Mark is a dual World Individual Champion (1994 in Fagnano, Italy and 1997 in Lima, Peru) and also dual World Team Champion in 1998 (Double Trap at Barcelona, Spain with Michael Diamond and Adam Vella) and 1999 (Trap in Tampere, Finland with Michael Diamond and Glenn Kable). When Mark won the World Cup Trap Gold Medal in Los Angeles, USA (1991) he became the first-ever Australian to win an individual ISSF World Cup in any Shooting discipline. He also won World Cup gold medals in Lonato, Italy (1992); Munich, Germany (1994); Lima, Peru (1999); Sydney, Australia (2000); and Perth, Australia (2003). At the 2006 Commonwealth Games in Melbourne, Mark won a gold medal in men's Double Trap.

== Personal life ==
=== Education ===
Russell Mark was educated in Ballarat, Victoria, at the Brown Hill Primary School (1969 – 1974) and Ballarat East High School (Woodman's Hill Secondary College) (1975 – 1981). He was elected as the school captain in his final year. He completed a Degree of Business Studies (Property Valuation) at the Royal Melbourne Institute of Technology (1982 – 1985).

== Competition shooting career ==
Mark's career included an individual Olympic gold and silver medal, 2 individual World Championships (twice runner-up), 6 World Cup Championships and 2 World Team Championships as well as 39 Australian Clay Target Association National Open Championships (current record holder). His first Open Australian Championship came in 1980 as a sixteen-year-old junior competitor in Perth where he also set a new Australian Open Record for consecutive hits. He had a streak of twenty consecutive years from 1988 to 2007 where he won at least one Australian Title each year.

In September, 1992 at a major tournament in Tamworth, NSW, Mark became the first Australian to hit more than one thousand targets in succession. He finished the competition with 1177 hits in a row breaking his own Australian record set in January, 1992 at Canberra of 859 consecutive hits. At the Geelong Clay Target Club in March, 1990 he hit 288 Double Rise targets in succession to create a new Australian Record that still stands at this time.

In 1997, he won the men's Double Trap World Championship in Peru with a new World Record.

Mark held the ISSF world number one ranking in Men's Double Trap on more than fifteen occasions between July, 1994 and September, 2003.

In 2006, Mark competed at the Melbourne Commonwealth Games where he won a gold medal with Craig Trembath in the Double Trap Pairs event. He participated in the Beijing 2008 Summer Olympics, making the final and finishing 5th in Men's Double Trap. In 2010, he declared an intention to make the London 2012 Summer Olympics for his sixth and last appearance. On June 7, 2012, Mark was named in the Australian Olympic team.

As well as six Olympic appearances he also competed at six Commonwealth Games (1990, 1994, 2002, 2006, 2010, 2014). Mark competed in the open individual ISSF World Championships on 22 consecutive occasions; 1986, 1987, 1989, 1990, 1991, 1993, 1994, 1995, 1997, 1998, 1999, 2001, 2002, 2003, 2005, 2006, 2007, 2009, 2010, 2011, 2013, 2014. This is a record for any Australian shotgun athlete.

On August 26, 2014, Mark announced he would be retiring from international competition on September 14, 2014, at the conclusion of the ISSF World Championship which was conducted in Granada, Spain.

Olympic results
Event	1988	1992	1996	2000	2004	2008	2012
Trap (mixed)	15th 144+47	9th 144+49	Not held				
Trap (men)	Not held		13th 120	13th 113	—	—	—
Double trap (men)	Not held		(gold) Gold; 141+48	(silver) Silver; 143+44	—	5th 136+45	20th 128

== Coaching career ==
Russell Mark is a registered ISSF 'A' class licensed coach and is one of the world's most successful, influential and sought after clay target shooting instructors. He has trained competitors, national teams and coaches in a multitude of countries that include Great Britain, USA, Qatar, India, Malaysia, Thailand, Japan, Brunei, Singapore, Philippines, South Korea, Trinidad and Tobago, Slovenia, Montenegro, New Zealand, Papua New Guinea, Kuwait and Italy.

In October, 1996 Mark received world-wide media attention for taking a contract to coach Prince Sufri Bolkiah from Brunei, at his personal shooting range for two weeks.

In 2004, Mark served as part of the administrative support team at the Athens 2004 Summer Olympics working for the Australian Olympic Committee as an Athlete's Liaison Officer as well as controversially taking the position as the personal coach to the Indian marksman Rajyavardhan Singh Rathore who went on to become India's first ever individual Olympic medalist by winning a silver medal.

== Honours ==
In 1997, Mark was honoured with the Order of Australia Medal for services to sport and the Australian Sports Medal in June 2000.

In August 2007, in Munich, Germany the International Shooting Sports Federation inducted him as the greatest Double Trap competitor of all time. This was an accolade he shared with fellow shotgun shooters Luciano Giovannetti (men's trap, from Italy), Kimberly Rhode (women's double trap and skeet, from USA), and Susan Nattrass (women's trap, from Canada).

In March 2009, at 45 years of age, Mark was admitted into the Australian Clay Target Association's Hall of Fame as its youngest member at the time.

In 2019, Mark was inducted into the Sport Australia Hall of Fame. He is the second shotgun shooter so honoured. He was preceded by Donald Mackintosh who titled at the Paris 1900 Summer Olympics.

The Australian Clay Target Association made Russell Mark a life member in March 2024.
