= Hu Binyuan =

Chinese sport shooter

Personal information
- Born: November 7, 1977 (age 48) Shanghai, China
- Height: 180 cm / 5 ft 11 in (2012)
- Weight: 67 kg / 148 lb (2012)
Medal record
Men's shooting
Representing China
Olympic Games
Bronze medal – third place	2008 Beijing	Double trap
World Championships
Bronze medal – third place	2013 Lima	Double trap
Asian Championships
Gold medal – first place	2019 Doha	Double trap team
Silver medal – second place	2015 Kuwait City	Double trap
Silver medal – second place	2015 Kuwait City	Double trap team
Bronze medal – third place	2017 Astana	Double trap team

Hu Binyuan (Chinese: 胡斌渊; pinyin: Hú Bīnyuān; born November 7, 1977, in Shanghai) is a male Chinese sports shooter who competed in the 2004 Summer Olympics, 2008 Summer Olympics and the 2012 Summer Olympics.

He finished fourth at the 2004 double trap competition and won the bronze medal in the 2008 double trap competition.
