= Daniele Di Spigno =

Italian sport shooter

Personal information
- Nationality: Italy
- Born: 19 September 1974 (age 51) Rome, Italy
- Height: 6 ft 0 in (1.83 m)
- Weight: 183 lb (83 kg)

Sport
- Sport: Sports shooting
- Club: Fiamme Oro
- Coached by: Mirco Cerci

Daniele Di Spigno (born 9 September 1974), is an Italian sport shooter who competed in the 2000 Summer Olympics, in the 2004 Summer Olympics, the 2008 Summer Olympics, and the 2012 London Olympics.

== Records ==
Current world records held in double trap
Men	Teams	424	Italy (Innocenti, Bernasconi, Gasparini); Italy (Barillà, Di Spigno, Gasparini)	August 3, 2013; September 14, 2014	Suhl (GER); Granada (ESP)
