= Marco Innocenti =

Italian sports shooter

Personal information
- Nationality: Italian
- Born: 16 August 1978 (age 48) Prato, Italy
- Height: 1.79 m (5 ft 10 in)
- Weight: 90 kg (198 lb)

Sport
- Country: Italy
- Sport: Shooting
- Event: Double trap
- Club: Tiro a Volo Bagnolo
Medal record
Olympic Games
Silver medal – second place	2016 Rio de Janeiro	Double trap
World Championships
Gold medal – first place	2018 Changwon	Team double trap

Marco Innocenti (born 16 August 1978) is an Italian sport shooter who competed in the 2000 Summer Olympics and in the 2004 Summer Olympics.
