= Giovanni Pellielo =

Italian sport shooter (born 1970)

Personal information
- Nickname: Johnny
- National team: Italy
- Born: 11 January 1970 (age 56) Vercelli, Italy
- Height: 1.74 m (5 ft 9 in)
- Weight: 93 kg (205 lb)

Sport
- Country: Italy
- Sport: Shooting
- Event: Trap
- Club: Fiamme Azzurre
- Start activity: 1991 (senior)
- Coached by: Albano Pera
Medal record
Men's shooting
Representing Italy
Event	1st	2nd	3rd
Olympic Games	0	3	1
World Championships	16	6	3
World Cup	10	2	7
World Cup Final	7	7	2
European Championships	18	9	5
European Games	1	1	1
Mediterranean Games	3	1	1
Total	55	29	20
Olympic Games
Silver medal – second place	2004 Athens	Trap
Silver medal – second place	2008 Beijing	Trap
Silver medal – second place	2016 Rio de Janeiro	Trap
Bronze medal – third place	2000 Sydney	Trap
World Championships
Gold medal – first place	1993 Barcelona	Trap team
Gold medal – first place	1994 Fagnano	Trap team
Gold medal – first place	1995 Nicosia	Trap
Gold medal – first place	1995 Nicosia	Trap team
Gold medal – first place	1997 Lima	Trap
Gold medal – first place	1997 Lima	Trap team
Gold medal – first place	1998 Barcelona	Trap
Gold medal – first place	1998 Barcelona	Trap team
Gold medal – first place	2005 Lonato del Garda	Trap team
Gold medal – first place	2009 Maribor	Trap team
Gold medal – first place	2010 Munich	Trap team
Gold medal – first place	2011 Belgrade	Trap team
Gold medal – first place	2013 Lima	Trap
Gold medal – first place	2014 Granada	Trap team
Gold medal – first place	2017 Moscow	Trap team
Gold medal – first place	2019 Lonato del Garda	Trap team
Silver medal – second place	1993 Barcelona	Trap
Silver medal – second place	2003 Nicosia	Trap
Silver medal – second place	2003 Nicosia	Trap team
Silver medal – second place	2007 Nicosia	Trap team
Silver medal – second place	2015 Lonato del Garda	Trap
Silver medal – second place	2015 Lonato del Garda	Trap team
Silver medal – second place	2023 Baku	Trap team
Bronze medal – third place	2002 Lahti	Trap
Bronze medal – third place	2014 Granada	Trap
Bronze medal – third place	2018 Changwon	Trap team
European Games
Gold medal – first place	2023 Kraków-Małopolska	Mixed trap
Silver medal – second place	2019 Minsk	Mixed trap
Bronze medal – third place	2015 Baku	Trap
European Championships
Gold medal – first place	1997 Sipoo	Trap
Gold medal – first place	2009 Osijek	Trap
Gold medal – first place	2015 Maribor	Trap
Gold medal – first place	2025 Chateauroux	Trap Team
Silver medal – second place	1999 Poussan	Trap
Silver medal – second place	2001 Zagreb	Trap
Silver medal – second place	2005 Belgrade	Trap
Silver medal – second place	2010 Kazan	Trap
Silver medal – second place	2024 Lonato	Mixed team trap
Bronze medal – third place	2000 Montecatini	Trap
Mediterranean Games
Gold medal – first place	1997 Bari	Trap
Gold medal – first place	2005 Almería	Trap
Gold medal – first place	2013 Mersin	Trap
Silver medal – second place	2009 Pescara	Trap
Bronze medal – third place	2018 Tarragona	Trap

Giovanni Pellielo (born 11 January 1970) is an Italian sport shooter. He won the silver medal in Men's trap at the 2008 Summer Olympics, and also earned a bronze medal in the 2000 Summer Olympics in Sydney and a silver medal in the 2004 Summer Olympics in Athens and 2016 Rio Olympics.

== Biography ==
Giovanni Pellielo is trained by the Olympic champion and technical commissioner of the Italian national team Albano Pera. He won ten stages of the World Cup and fifteen medals at the World Cup Final from 1992 to 2015.

Since 2016, Pellielo has been an ordained bishop in the liberal Catholic Holy Celtic Church International.

== Medals ==
=== Olympic Games ===
Event	1992	1996	2000	2004	2008	2012	2016	2024
Trap (mixed)	10th 145+48	Not held						
Trap (men)	Not held	13th 120	(bronze) Bronze; 116+24	(silver) Silver; 122+24	(silver) Silver; 120+23	8th 121	(silver) Silver; 122+27	16th 121

=== World Championships ===
Pellielo won 25 medal, 9 individual and 16 in team events, at the World Shooting Championships.

Edition	Venue	Event	Individual			Team			Other teammates
Edition	Venue	Event	1st place, gold medalist(s)	2nd place, silver medalist(s)	3rd place, bronze medalist(s)	1st place, gold medalist(s)	2nd place, silver medalist(s)	3rd place, bronze medalist(s)	Other teammates
1993	(Spain) Barcelona	Trap	0	1	0	1	0	0	Roberto Scalzone, Marco Venturini
1994	(Italy) Fagnano Olona	Trap	0	0	0	1	0	0	Roberto Scalzone, Marco Venturini
1995	(Cyprus) Nicosia	Trap	1	0	0	1	0	0	Marcello Tittarelli, Marco Venturini
1997	(Peru) Lima	Trap	1	0	0	1	0	0	Roberto Scalzone, Rodolfo Viganò
1998	(Spain) Barcelona	Trap	1	0	0	1	0	0	Marcello Tittarelli, Marco Venturini
2002	(Finland) Lahti	Trap	0	0	1	0	0	0	
2003	(Cyprus) Nicosia	Trap	0	1	0	0	1	0	Marco Venturini, Massimo Fabbrizi
2005	(Italy) Lonato	Trap	0	0	0	1	0	0	Massimiliano Mola, Massimo Fabbrizi
2007	(Cyprus) Nicosia	Trap	0	0	0	0	1	0	Erminio Frasca, Massimo Fabbrizi
2009	(Slovenia) Maribor	Trap	0	0	0	1	0	0	Erminio Frasca, Massimo Fabbrizi
2010	(Germany) Munich	Trap	0	0	0	1	0	0	Erminio Frasca, Massimo Fabbrizi
2011	(Serbia) Belgrade	Trap	0	0	0	1	0	0	Rodolfo Viganò, Massimo Fabbrizi
2013	(Peru) Lima	Trap	1	0	0	0	0	0	
2014	(Spain) Granada	Trap	0	0	1	1	0	0	Valerio Grazini, Massimo Fabbrizi
2015	(Italy) Lonato	Trap	0	1	0	0	1	0	Valerio Grazini, Massimo Fabbrizi
2017	(Russia) Moscow	Trap	0	0	0	1	0	0	Valerio Grazini, Daniele Resca
2018	(Spain) Granada	Trap	0	0	0	1	0	0	Valerio Grazini, Mauro De Filippis
2019	(South Korea) Changwon	Trap	0	0	0	0	0	1	Valerio Grazini, Mauro De Filippis
			4	3	2	12	3	1	

=== World Cup ===
The Shotgun World Cup took place in 5 stages + the World Cup Finals up to 1997, since 1998 it takes place in 4 stages + the World Cup Finals.

Edition	Venue	Stage	Individual		
Edition	Venue	Stage	1st place, gold medalist(s)	2nd place, silver medalist(s)	3rd place, bronze medalist(s)
1992	(Italy) Lonato	WC 4	1	0	0
1992	(Germany) Suhl	WC 5	1	0	0
1993	(Italy) Fagnano Olona	WC 5	1	0	0
1994	(Cyprus) Nicosia	WC 1	1	0	0
1995	(Japan) Chiba	WC 4	1	0	0
1997	(India) New Delhi	WC 1	1	0	0
1998	(United States) Atlanta	WC 3	0	0	1
2001	(Italy) Lonato	WC 3	0	0	1
2002	(China) Shanghai	WC 2	1	0	0
2003	(Italy) Lonato	WC 4	1	0	0
2004	(Brazil) Americana	WC 4	0	0	1
2005	(South Korea) Changwon	WC 1	1	0	0
2009	(Belarus) Minsk	WC 3	1	0	0
2012	(United Kingdom) London	WC 2	0	0	1
2013	(United Arab Emirates) Al Ain	WC 2	0	1	0
2017	(India) New Delhi	WC 1	0	1	0
			10	2	4

=== European Championships ===
Pellielo won his first medal at senior level at the European Shooting Championships in 1991, at the age of 21, in the edition held in Casalecchio di Reno near Bologna.

Edition	Venue	Event	Individual			Team			Other teammates
Edition	Venue	Event	1st place, gold medalist(s)	2nd place, silver medalist(s)	3rd place, bronze medalist(s)	1st place, gold medalist(s)	2nd place, silver medalist(s)	3rd place, bronze medalist(s)	Other teammates
1991	(Italy) Bologna	Trap	0	0	0	1	0	0	Marco Venturini, Albano Pera
1994	(Portugal) Lisbon	Trap	0	0	0	1	0	0	Marco Venturini, Roberto Scalzone
1995	(Finland) Lahti	Trap	0	0	0	0	1	0	Marco Venturini, Marcello Tittarelli
1997	(Finland) Sipoo	Trap	1	0	0	1	0	0	Daniele Cioni, Rodolfo Viganò
1999	(France) Poussan	Trap	0	1	0	1	0	0	Marco Venturini, Rodolfo Viganò
2000	(Italy) Montecatini Terme	Trap	0	0	1	1	0	0	Marco Venturini, Rodolfo Viganò
2001	(Croatia) Zagreb	Trap	0	1	0	1	0	0	Marco Venturini, Carlo Angelantoni
2002	(Italy) Lonato del Garda	Trap	0	0	0	1	0	0	Marco Venturini, Rodolfo Viganò
2003	(France) Antibes	Universal trench	0	1	0	0	0	1	
2005	(Serbia) Belgrade	Trap	0	1	0	0	1	0	Massimiliano Mola, Massimo Fabbrizi
2006	(Slovenia) Maribor	Trap	0	0	0	1	0	0	Erminio Frasca, Massimo Fabbrizi
2008	(Cyprus) Nicosia	Trap	0	0	0	1	0	0	Erminio Frasca, Massimo Fabbrizi
2009	(Croatia) Osijek	Trap	1	0	0	1	0	0	Erminio Frasca, Massimo Fabbrizi
2010	(Russia) Kazan	Trap	0	1	0	0	1	0	Erminio Frasca, Massimo Fabbrizi
2011	(Serbia) Belgrade	Trap	0	0	0	0	0	1	Rodolfo Viganò, Massimo Fabbrizi
2012	(Cyprus) Larnaca	Trap	0	0	0	0	0	1	Rodolfo Viganò, Massimo Fabbrizi
2014	(Hungary) Sarlóspuszta	Trap	0	0	0	1	0	0	Mauro De Filippis, Massimo Fabbrizi
2015	(Slovenia) Maribor	Trap	1	0	0	0	0	0	
2016	(Italy) Lonato del Garda	Trap	0	0	0	0	0	1	Daniele Resca, Massimo Fabbrizi
2017	(Azerbaijan) Baku	Trap	0	0	0	1	0	0	Daniele Resca, Mauro De Filippis
2018	(Austria) Leobersdorf	Trap	0	0	0	1	0	0	Emanuele Buccolieri, Mauro De Filippis
2018	(Austria) Leobersdorf	Trap mixed	0	0	0	1	0	0	Jessica Rossi
2019	(Italy) Lonato del Garda	Trap	0	0	0	1	0	0	Valerio Grazini, Mauro De Filippis
			3	5	1	15	3	4	

== Records ==
Current world records held in trap
Men	Qualification	125	Giovanni Pellielo (ITA); Ray Ycong (USA); Marcello Tittarelli (ITA); Lance Bade (USA); Pavel Gurkin (RUS); David Kostelecký (CZE); Massimo Fabbrizi (ITA); Massimo Fabbrizi (ITA); Michael Diamond (AUS); Giovanni Pellielo (ITA); Casey Wallace (USA); Jean Pierre Brol Cardenas (GUA); James Willett (AUS); Josip Glasnovic (CRO); Jiří Lipták (CZE); Sebastien Guerrero (FRA); Anton Glasnović (CRO)	April 1, 1994; June 9, 1995; June 11, 1996; July 23, 1998; August 10, 2005; October 5, 2006; May 15, 2009; September 6, 2011; August 6, 2012; April 18, 2013; October 16, 2014; August 15, 2015; March 19, 2019; April 9, 2019; June 2, 2021; September 24, 2023; October 17, 2025	Nicosia (CYP); Lahti (FIN); Suhl (GER); Barcelona (ESP); Americana (BRA); Granada (ESP); Munich (GER); Belgrade (SRB); London (ENG); Al Ain (UAE); Guadalajara (MEX); Qabala (AZE); Guadalajara (MEX); Al Ain (UAE); Osijek (CRO); Osijek (CRO); Athens (GRE)
Men	Teams	371	Italy (De Filippis, Pellielo, Fabbrizi)	September 24, 2023	Osijek (CRO)
World records held in Trap (2018–2025)
Mixed Team	Final	47	Jessica Rossi (Italy); Giovanni Pellielo (Italy)	August 5, 2018	Leobersdorf (AUT)

== See also ==
- Multi-participation men in shooting at the Olympic Games
- Italy at the Olympics – Athletes with most appearances
- World Cup Multi-Medalists
- Trap World Champions
