= Shooting at the 2011 Pan American Games – Men's trap =

Shooting – Men's trap at the 2011 Pan American Games
- Venue: Jalisco Hunting Club
- Dates: October 18–19
- Competitors: 28 from 17 nations

Medalists
Gold medal	Jean Pierre Brol	Guatemala
Silver medal	Danilo Caro	Colombia
Bronze medal	Roberto Schmits	Brazil

The men's trap shooting event at the 2011 Pan American Games was on October 18 and 19 at the Jalisco Hunting Club in Guadalajara. The defending Pan American Games champion is Juan Dasque of the Argentina.

The event consisted of two rounds: a qualifier and a final. In the qualifier, each shooter fired 5 sets of 25 shots in trap shooting.

The top 6 shooters in the qualifying round moved on to the final round. There, they fired one additional round of 25. The total score from all 150 shots was used to determine final ranking. Ties are broken using a shoot-off; additional shots are fired one pair at a time until there is no longer a tie.

== Schedule ==
All times are Central Standard Time (UTC-6).

Date	Time	Round
October 18, 2011	9:30	Qualification Day 1
October 19, 2011	9:00	Qualification Day 2
October 19, 2011	14:00	Final

== Records ==
The existing world and Pan American Games records were as follows.

Qualification records
World record	Giovanni Pellielo (ITA); Ray Ycong (USA); Marcello Tittarelli (ITA); Lance Bade (USA); Pavel Gurkin (RUS); David Kostelecký (CZE); Massimo Fabbrizi (ITA)	125	Nicosia, Cyprus; Lahti, Finland; Suhl, Germany; Barcelona, Spain; Americana, Brazil; Granada, Spain; Munich, Germany	1 April 1994; 9 June 1995; 11 June 1996; 23 July 1998; 10 August 2005; 5 October 2006; 15 May 2009
Pan American record	Rodrigo Bastos (BRA)	124	Santo Domingo, Dominican Republic	August 3, 2003

Final records
World record	Karsten Bindrich (GER)	149 (124+25)	Nicosia, Cyprus	10 July 2008
Pan American record	Juan Dasque (ARG)	138 (114+24)	Rio de Janeiro, Brazil	July 15, 2007

== Results ==
28 athletes from 17 countries competed.

=== Qualification ===
Rank	Athlete	Country	1	2	3	4	5	Total	Notes
1	Jean Pierre Brol	Guatemala	25	24	25	25	25	124	Q, EPR
2	Danilo Caro	Colombia	25	25	23	25	25	123	Q
3	Matthew Gossett	United States	23	25	24	24	25	121	Q
4	Roberto Schmits	Brazil	25	25	23	24	23	120	Q
5	Eduardo Lorenzo	Dominican Republic	24	24	23	23	25	119	Q
6	Sergio Piñero	Dominican Republic	24	25	25	23	22	119	Q
7	Juan Carlos Pérez	Bolivia	23	25	22	24	24	118	
8	Jacob Henry Turner	United States	23	25	23	23	24	118	
9	Asier Cilloniz	Peru	23	25	23	23	23	117	
10	Rodrigo Bastos	Brazil	24	24	24	23	22	117	
11	Carlos Belletini	Argentina	20	25	25	24	22	116	
12	Robert John Auerbach	Trinidad and Tobago	22	23	25	24	22	116	
13	Leonel Martinez	Venezuela	25	24	23	22	22	116	
14	Ian Shaw	Canada	24	23	23	24	21	115	
15	Juan Zanella	Mexico	23	21	22	24	24	114	
16	Ramon Toca	Mexico	24	23	21	22	24	114	
17	Mario Soarez	Venezuela	24	19	23	22	25	113	
18	Gianluca Agostino Dapelo	Chile	24	24	22	22	21	113	
19	Fernando Borello	Argentina	24	23	22	20	21	110	
20	Cesar Menacho	Bolivia	22	24	19	21	23	109	
21	Michel Daou	Netherlands Antilles	22	22	25	19	21	109	
22	Alvaro Enrique Rodriguez	Guatemala	20	20	21	24	23	108	
23	Paul Shaw	Canada	23	21	23	20	21	108	
24	Christopher Thomas Jackson	Cayman Islands	20	24	20	20	23	107	
25	Alessandro De Souza Ferreira	Peru	23	21	24	16	22	106	
26	Claudio Cesar Vergara	Chile	19	24	21	21	21	106	
27	Shaun Barnes	Jamaica	23	21	20	16	21	101	
28	Eduardo Elias Taylor	Panama	19	20	20	20	20	99	

=== Final ===
Rank	Athlete	Country	Qual	Final	Total	Notes
1st place, gold medalist(s)	Jean Pierre Brol	Guatemala	124	22	146	FPR
2nd place, silver medalist(s)	Danilo Caro	Colombia	123	22	145	
3rd place, bronze medalist(s)	Roberto Schmits	Brazil	120	23	143	
4	Matthew Gossett	United States	121	21	142	
5	Eduardo Lorenzo	Dominican Republic	119	21	140	
6	Sergio Piñero	Dominican Republic	119	20	139	
