= David Kostelecký =

Czech sport shooter (born 1975)

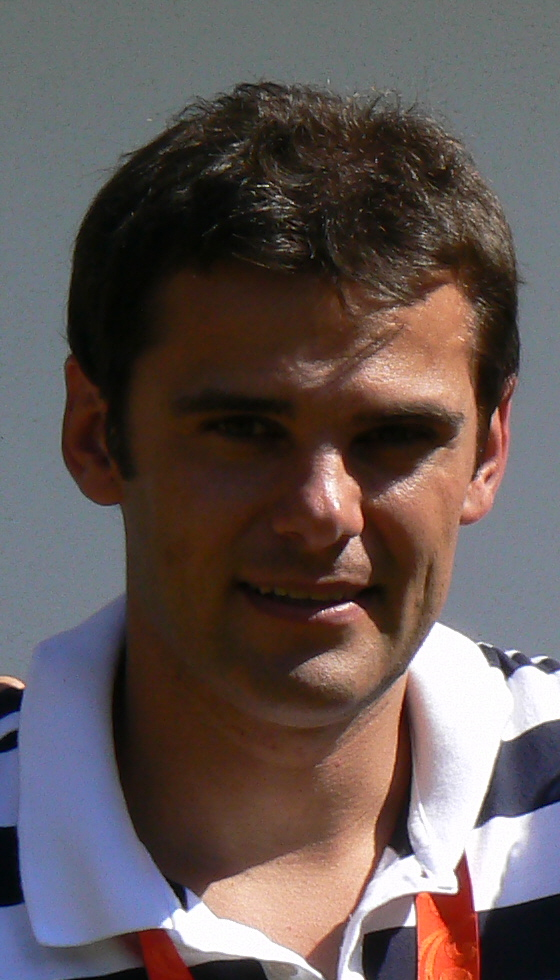
- Kostelecký in 2008

Personal information
- Born: 12 May 1975 (age 51) Brno, Czechoslovakia
- Height: 1.90 m (6 ft 3 in)
Medal record
Men's Sport shooting
Representing Czech Republic
Olympic Games
Gold medal – first place	2008 Beijing	Trap
Silver medal – second place	2020 Tokyo	Trap
World Championships
Silver medal – second place	2011 Belgrade	Trap
Silver medal – second place	2011 Belgrade	Team trap
Silver medal – second place	2017 Moscow	Team trap
Silver medal – second place	2022 Osijek	Team trap
Bronze medal – third place	2009 Maribor	Team trap
Bronze medal – third place	2014 Granada	Team trap
Bronze medal – third place	2023 Baku	Team trap
Bronze medal – third place	2026 Doha	Trap team
European Games
Gold medal – first place	2019 Minsk	Trap
European Championships
Gold medal – first place	2002 Lonato del Garda	Trap
Gold medal – first place	2010 Kazan	Team trap
Gold medal – first place	2011 Belgrade	Team trap
Gold medal – first place	2017 Baku	Trap
Silver medal – second place	1998 Nicosia	Trap
Silver medal – second place	2008 Nicosia	Trap
Silver medal – second place	2011 Belgrade	Trap
Silver medal – second place	2012 Larnaca	Team trap
Silver medal – second place	2016 Lonato del Garda	Team trap
Silver medal – second place	2023 Osijek	Team trap
Bronze medal – third place	2014 Sarlóspuszta	Trap
Bronze medal – third place	2017 Baku	Team trap

David Kostelecký (Czech pronunciation: [ˈdavɪt ˈkostɛlɛtskiː]; born 12 May 1975) is a Czech sport shooter. He won the gold medal in the Men's Trap event at the 2008 Summer Olympics and the silver medal in the same event at the 2020 Summer Olympics.

== Sports career ==
He started shooting after receiving an air rifle from his grandfather, a hunter, and following his older brother. Being a junior, he was labeled unperspective, as he stated in 2021.

Nevertheless, in 1993, Kostelecký won a bronze medal at the European junior championships in his home Brno. He won junior world championships in 1995 in Nicosia, where he finished second in the European championships in 1995, starting his senior championships medal collection. In 1996, he participated in his first Olympics, finishing 31st in the qualification round behind both his compatriots (Jiří Gach finished eighth and Pavel Kubec 13th).

In 2002 he became European champion in Lonato del Garda taking advantage from the basic round result of 122 and keeping off Marco Venturini in the final. It was the first individual European gold in trap for any Czech shooter. He also finished second in the 2006 ISSF World Cup final.

After adding silver in 2011 and bronze in 2014, Kostelecký won his second European championships title in 2017 in Baku.

== Personal life ==
Kostelecký married Slovak shooter Lenka Barteková in 2010, a year later their son Daniel was born.

== Olympic results ==
Event	1996	2000	2004	2008	2012	2016	2021
Trap	31st 118	6th 116+22	—	(gold) Gold; 121+25	14th 120	4th 118+13+9	(silver) Silver; 123+5+6

== Records ==
Current world records held in Olympic Trap
Men	Qualification	125	Giovanni Pellielo (ITA); Ray Ycong (USA); Marcello Tittarelli (ITA); Lance Bade (USA); Pavel Gurkin (RUS); David Kostelecký (CZE); Massimo Fabbrizi (ITA); Massimo Fabbrizi (ITA); Michael Diamond (AUS); Giovanni Pellielo (ITA); Casey Wallace (USA); Jean Pierre Brol Cardenas (GUA); James Willett (AUS); Josip Glasnovic (CRO); Jiří Lipták (CZE); Sebastien Guerrero (FRA); Anton Glasnović (CRO)	April 1, 1994; June 9, 1995; June 11, 1996; July 23, 1998; August 10, 2005; October 5, 2006; May 15, 2009; September 6, 2011; August 6, 2012; April 18, 2013; October 16, 2014; August 15, 2015; March 19, 2019; April 9, 2019; June 2, 2021; September 24, 2023; October 17, 2025	Nicosia (CYP); Lahti (FIN); Suhl (GER); Barcelona (ESP); Americana (BRA); Granada (ESP); Munich (GER); Belgrade (SRB); London (ENG); Al Ain (UAE); Guadalajara (MEX); Qabala (AZE); Guadalajara (MEX); Al Ain (UAE); Osijek (CRO); Osijek (CRO); Athens (GRE)
