= Pavel Gurkin =

Russian sport shooter

Pavel Gurkin (born 12 July 1966) is a Russian sport shooter who specializes in the trap.

At the 2008 Olympic Games he finished in joint tenth place in the trap qualification, missing a place among the top six, who progressed to the final round.

Current world records in Trap
| Men | Qualification | 125 | Giovanni Pellielo (ITA); Ray Ycong (USA); Marcello Tittarelli (ITA); Lance Bade (USA); Pavel Gurkin (RUS); David Kostelecký (CZE); Massimo Fabbrizi (ITA); Massimo Fabbrizi (ITA); Michael Diamond (AUS); Giovanni Pellielo (ITA); Casey Wallace (USA); Jean Pierre Brol Cardenas (GUA); James Willett (AUS); Josip Glasnovic (CRO); Jiří Lipták (CZE); Sebastien Guerrero (FRA); Anton Glasnović (CRO) | April 1, 1994; June 9, 1995; June 11, 1996; July 23, 1998; August 10, 2005; October 5, 2006; May 15, 2009; September 6, 2011; August 6, 2012; April 18, 2013; October 16, 2014; August 15, 2015; March 19, 2019; April 9, 2019; June 2, 2021; September 24, 2023; October 17, 2025 | Nicosia (CYP); Lahti (FIN); Suhl (GER); Barcelona (ESP); Americana (BRA); Granada (ESP); Munich (GER); Belgrade (SRB); London (ENG); Al Ain (UAE); Guadalajara (MEX); Qabala (AZE); Guadalajara (MEX); Al Ain (UAE); Osijek (CRO); Osijek (CRO); Athens (GRE) |
