= Lance Bade =

American sport shooter (born 1971)

Personal information
- Full name: Lance Thomas Bade
- Born: February 6, 1971 (age 55) Vancouver, Washington
- Height: 5 ft 5 in (1.65 m)
Medal record
Men's shooting
Representing the United States
Olympic Games
Bronze medal – third place	1996 Atlanta	Trap
Pan American Games
Gold medal – first place	1995 Mar del Plata	Trap
Gold medal – first place	1995 Mar del Plata	Trap team
Gold medal – first place	1999 Winnipeg	Double trap
Gold medal – first place	2003 Santo Domingo	Trap
Silver medal – second place	1995 Mar del Plata	Double trap team
Silver medal – second place	1999 Winnipeg	Trap

Lance Thomas Bade (born February 6, 1971) is a target shooter and three-time Olympian.

== Career ==
At the 1996 Summer Olympics, Bade competed in the trap and double trap. In the trap, Bade won the bronze medal. In the double trap, Bade finished in 10th place.

At the 2000 Summer Olympics, Bade finished in 16th place in the trap and 6th place in the double trap.

At the 2004 Summer Olympics, Bade finished in 5th place in the trap.

== Records ==
Current world records held in Olympic trap
Men's	Qualification	125	Giovanni Pellielo (ITA); Ray Ycong (USA); Marcello Tittarelli (ITA); Lance Bade (USA); Pavel Gurkin (RUS); David Kostelecký (CZE); Massimo Fabbrizi (ITA); Massimo Fabbrizi (ITA); Michael Diamond (AUS); Giovanni Pellielo (ITA); Casey Wallace (USA); Jean Pierre Brol Cardenas (GUA); James Willett (AUS); Josip Glasnovic (CRO); Jiří Lipták (CZE); Sebastien Guerrero (FRA); Anton Glasnović (CRO)	April 1, 1994; June 9, 1995; June 11, 1996; July 23, 1998; August 10, 2005; October 5, 2006; May 15, 2009; September 6, 2011; August 6, 2012; April 18, 2013; October 16, 2014; August 15, 2015; March 19, 2019; April 9, 2019; June 2, 2021; September 24, 2023; October 17, 2025	Nicosia (CYP); Lahti (FIN); Suhl (GER); Barcelona (ESP); Americana (BRA); Granada (ESP); Munich (GER); Belgrade (SRB); London (ENG); Al Ain (UAE); Guadalajara (MEX); Qabala (AZE); Guadalajara (MEX); Al Ain (UAE); Osijek (CRO); Osijek (CRO); Athens (GRE)
