= 2012 European Shotgun Championships =

- Dates: 19 - 25 May
- Host city: Larnaca, Cyprus
- Level: Senior & junior
- Events: 11 men (6 individual + 5 team); 8 women (4 individual + 4 team)

The 2012 European Shotgun Championships were held in Larnaca, Cyprus from May 19-25, 2012.

== Men's events ==
Event	Gold	Silver	Bronze
Trap	Giovanni Cernogoraz (CRO)	Jiří Lipták (CZE)	Josip Glasnović (CRO)
Trap TEAM	Croatia; Giovanni Cernogoraz; Josip Glasnović; Anton Glasnović	Czech Republic; Jiří Lipták; David Kostelecký; Jiří Gach	Italy; Giovanni Pellielo; Massimo Fabbrizi; Rodolfo Viganò
Double Trap	Håkan Dahlby (SWE)	Steven Scott (GBR)	Vasily Mosin (RUS)
Double Trap TEAM	Russia; Vasily Mosin; Mikhail Leybo; Vitaly Fokeev	Great Britain; Steven Scott; Stevan Walton; Richard Faulds	Italy; Daniele Di Spigno; Davide Gasparini; Francesco D'Aniello
Skeet	Valerio Luchini (ITA)	Efthimios Mitas (GRE)	Georgios Achilleos (CYP)
Skeet TEAM	Cyprus; Georgios Achilleos; Antonakis Andreou; Andreas Chasikos	Italy; Valerio Luchini; Luigi Lodde; Ennio Falco	Czech Republic; Jakub Tomeček; Tomáš Nýdrle; Jan Sychra

== Women's events ==
Event	Gold	Silver	Bronze
Trap	Deborah Gelisio (ITA)	Jessica Rossi (ITA)	Federica Caporuscio (ITA)
Trap TEAM	Italy; Jessica Rossi; Deborah Gelisio; Federica Caporuscio	Spain; Eva Clemente; Fátima Gálvez; Beatriz Martínez	Finland; Mopsi Veromaa; Satu Mäkelä-Nummela; Marika Salmi
Skeet	Yerjanik Avetisyan (ARM)	Christine Wenzel (GER)	Andri Eleftheriou (CYP)
Skeet TEAM	Cyprus; Andri Eleftheriou; Panayiota Andreou; Louiza Theophanous	Russia; Nadezda Konovalova; Olga Panarina; Marina Belikova	Germany; Christine Wenzel; Vanessa Hauff; Elena Neff

== Men's Junior events ==
Event	Gold	Silver	Bronze
Trap	Carlo Mancarella (ITA)	Mario Fuentes (ESP)	Valerio Grazini (ITA)
Trap TEAM	Italy; Carlo Mancarella; Valerio Grazini; Antonio Torsello	Spain; Mario Fuentes; Álvaro Gormaz; Adrián Jiménez	Russia; Maksim Smykov; Viktor Vasichkin; Ilya Vinogradov
Double Trap	Artem Nekrasov (RUS)	Nathan Lee Xuereb (MLT)	Kirill Fokeev (RUS)
Skeet	Nicolas Vasiliou (CYP)	Gabriele Rossetti (ITA)	Miroslav Pacak (CZE)
Skeet TEAM	Czech Republic; Miroslav Pacak; Miloš Slavíček; František Kadlec	Italy; Gabriele Rossetti; Vincenzo Grizi; Tammaro Cassandro	Cyprus; Nicolas Vasiliou; George Kazakos; Panayiotis Kyprianou

== Women's Junior events ==
Event	Gold	Silver	Bronze
Trap	Silvana Stanco (ITA)	Alessia Montanino (ITA)	Svetlana Krasheninnikova (RUS)
Trap TEAM	Italy; Silvana Stanco; Alessia Montanino; Alessia Iezzi	Czech Republic; Nikola Machačová; Lucie Rylichova; Gabriela Michalkova	Russia; Ekaterina Rabaya; Svetlana Krasheninnikova; Yulia Tugolukova
Skeet	Olga Firsova (RUS)	Natalia Vinogradova (RUS)	Veronika Sykorova (SVK)
Skeet TEAM	Russia; Olga Firsova; Natalia Vinogradova; Maria Meleshchenko	Great Britain; Sian Bruce; Hannah Gibson; Amber Hill	Ukraine; Iryna Malovichko; Anastasiia Koira; Daria Tokareva

== Medal summary ==
=== Seniors ===
* Host nation (Cyprus)

Rank	Nation	Gold	Silver	Bronze	Total
1	Italy	3	2	3	8
2	Cyprus*	2	0	2	4
3	Croatia	2	0	1	3
4	Russia	1	1	1	3
5	Armenia	1	0	0	1
5	Sweden	1	0	0	1
7	Czech Republic	0	2	1	3
8	Great Britain	0	2	0	2
9	Germany	0	1	1	2
10	Greece	0	1	0	1
10	Spain	0	1	0	1
12	Finland	0	0	1	1
Totals (12 entries)		10	10	10	30

=== Juniors ===
* Host nation (Cyprus)

Rank	Nation	Gold	Silver	Bronze	Total
1	Italy	4	3	1	8
2	Russia	3	1	4	8
3	Czech Republic	1	1	1	3
4	Cyprus*	1	0	1	2
5	Spain	0	2	0	2
6	Great Britain	0	1	0	1
6	Malta	0	1	0	1
8	Slovakia	0	0	1	1
8	Ukraine	0	0	1	1
Totals (9 entries)		9	9	9	27

== See also ==
- European Shooting Confederation
- International Shooting Sport Federation
- List of medalists at the European Shotgun Championships
