= Shooting at the 2004 Summer Olympics – Men's trap =

Men's trap at the Games of the XXVIII Olympiad
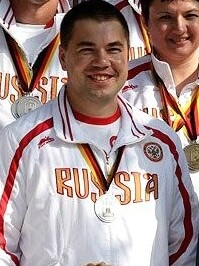
- Gold medalist Alexey Alipov (2010)
- Venue: Markópoulo Olympic Shooting Centre
- Dates: August 14, 2004; August 15, 2004
- Competitors: 35 from 26 nations
- Winning score: 149 =OR

Medalists
1st place, gold medalist(s)		Alexey Alipov	Russia
2nd place, silver medalist(s)		Giovanni Pellielo	Italy
3rd place, bronze medalist(s)		Adam Vella	Australia

The men's trap competition at the 2004 Summer Olympics was held on August 14 and 15 at the Markópoulo Olympic Shooting Centre near Athens, Greece. There were 35 competitors from 26 nations, with each nation having up to two shooters.

Russia's Alexey Alipov attained an almost perfect score of 149 to tie the Olympic record for the gold medal in this event. The silver medal was awarded to Italy's Giovanni Pellielo with 146 points, while Australia's Adam Vella claimed the bronze with 145. Vella's teammate and two-time defending Olympic champion Michael Diamond missed a chance for his third Olympic gold in the final round, after firing only 119 birds to earn the eighth position in the prelims. Alipov's victory was Russia's first gold medal in the event. Pellielo, who had taken bronze in 2000, was the fourth man to earn multiple medals in the trap.

== Background ==
This was the 19th appearance of the men's ISSF Olympic trap event. The event was held at every Summer Olympics from 1896 to 1924 (except 1904, when no shooting events were held) and from 1952 to 2016; it was open to women from 1968 to 1992.

Five of the 6 finalists from the 2000 Games returned: two-time gold medalist Michael Diamond of Australia, silver medalist Ian Peel of Great Britain, bronze medalist Giovanni Pellielo of Italy, fourth-place finisher Khaled Al-Mudhaf of Kuwait, and fifth-place finisher Marco Venturini of Italy. (The sixth finalist from Sydney, David Kostelecký of the Czech Republic, did not compete in Athens but returned to Beijing 2008 and won gold there.) The three World Champions since the 2000 Games were Diamond (2001, defending his 1999 title; he also took silver in 2002), Al-Mudhaf (2002), and Karsten Bindrich of Germany. Pellielo had made the podium twice in those three competitions (bronze in 2002 and silver in 2003). Other World medalists competing in Athens were Bret Erickson of the United States (silver 2001) and Alexey Alipov of Russia (bronze 2003). Diamond was favoured to win an unprecedented third gold in the event.

Fiji made its debut in the event. Great Britain made its 18th appearance, most among nations, having missed only the 1980 Moscow Games.

== Qualification ==
Each National Olympic Committee (NOC) could enter up to two shooters if the NOC earned enough quota sports or had enough crossover-qualified shooters. To compete, a shooter needed a quota spot and to achieve a Minimum Qualification Score (MQS). Once a shooter was using a quota spot in any shooting event, they could enter any other shooting event for which they had achieved the MQS as well (a crossover qualification). There were 32 quota spots available for the trap event: 1 at the 2001 World Championship, 4 at the 2002 World Cup events, 2 at the 2002 World Championship, 4 at the 2003 World Cup events, 5 at the 2003 European Championships, 2 at the 2003 Pan American Games, 1 at the 2003 World Championship, 3 at the 2004 Asian Championships, 2003 Oceania Championships, and 2004 Asian Championships, and various invitational and additional places. In 2004, three crossover qualifications were used in the trap, all from men qualified in the double trap.

== Competition format ==
The competition used the two-round 125+25 format introduced in 1996.

The event consisted of two rounds: a qualifier and a final. In the qualifier, each shooter fired 5 sets of 25 targets in trap shooting, with 10 targets being thrown to the left, 10 to the right, and 5 straight-away in each set. The shooters could take two shots at each target.

The top 6 shooters in the qualifying round moved on to the final round. There, they fired one additional round of 25 targets. The total score from all 150 targets was used to determine final ranking. Ties are broken using a shoot-off; additional shots are fired one at a time until there is no longer a tie.

== Records ==
Prior to this competition, the existing world and Olympic records were as follows.

Qualifying round
World record	Lance Bade (USA)	125	Barcelona, Spain	23 July 1998
Olympic record	Michael Diamond (AUS)	124	Atlanta, United States	21 July 1996

Final round
World record	Marcello Tittarelli (ITA)	150	Suhl, Germany	11 June 1996
Olympic record	Michael Diamond (AUS)	149	Atlanta, United States	21 July 1996

Alexey Alipov matched the Olympic records for both the 125-target qualifying round (124) and the 150-target total (149).

== Schedule ==
Date	Time	Round
Saturday, 14 August 2004		Qualifying: Course 1
Sunday, 15 August 2004	13:30	Qualifying: Course 2 Final

== Results ==
=== Qualifying round ===
Rank	Shooter	Nation	1	2	3	Day 1	4	5	Total	Notes
1	Alexey Alipov	Russia	25	25	24	74	25	25	124	Q, =OR
2	Lance Bade	United States	25	25	23	73	25	24	122	Q
3	Giovanni Pellielo	Italy	24	25	25	74	24	24	122	Q
4	Khaled Al-Mudhaf	Kuwait	25	24	23	72	24	25	121	Q
5	Adam Vella	Australia	24	25	23	72	25	24	121	Q
6	Ahmed Al-Maktoum	United Arab Emirates	25	25	23	73	25	23	121	Q
7	Olaf Kirchstein	Germany	25	23	23	71	23	25	119	
8	Michael Diamond	Australia	25	22	25	72	24	23	119	
9	Francesco Amici	San Marino	25	24	23	72	24	23	119	
9	Francisco Boza	Peru	25	25	23	73	24	22	119	
9	Derek Burnett	Ireland	25	24	23	72	24	23	119	
9	Stéphane Clamens	France	25	24	24	73	24	22	119	
13	Bret Erickson	United States	24	25	24	73	22	23	118	
14	Nidal Asmar	Lebanon	23	23	24	70	24	23	117	
14	Rodrigo Bastos	Brazil	24	23	23	70	23	24	117	
14	Karsten Bindrich	Germany	23	23	23	69	24	24	117	
14	Naser Meqlad	Kuwait	24	23	25	72	23	22	117	
14	Petri Nummela	Finland	25	24	24	73	25	19	117	
19	Ian Peel	Great Britain	23	24	23	70	23	23	116	
19	Manavjit Singh Sandhu	India	22	25	24	71	21	24	116	
21	Custódio Ezequiel	Portugal	21	24	24	69	24	22	115	
21	Lee Wung Yew	Singapore	24	25	23	72	21	22	115	
21	Mansher Singh	India	25	23	21	69	23	23	115	
21	Oğuzhan Tüzün	Turkey	22	24	23	69	23	23	115	
25	Maxim Kosarev	Russia	24	24	23	71	19	23	113	
25	Edward Ling	Great Britain	24	21	24	69	22	22	113	
27	Lucas Rafael Bennazar Ortiz	Puerto Rico	21	21	24	66	24	22	112	
27	Yves Tronc	France	22	24	23	69	25	18	112	
27	Marco Venturini	Italy	22	23	22	67	23	22	112	
30	Glenn Kable	Fiji	21	22	25	68	23	20	111	
31	Nikolaos Antoniadis	Greece	23	23	22	68	21	21	110	
32	Jethro Dionisio	Philippines	24	20	23	67	24	18	109	
33	Danilo Caro	Colombia	24	24	21	69	21	18	108	
34	Bernard Yeoh Cheng Han	Malaysia	22	22	21	65	20	22	107	
35	Francesc Repiso Romero	Andorra	24	23	22	69	23	14	106	

=== Final ===
Rank	Shooter	Nation	Qual	Final	Total	Notes
1st place, gold medalist(s)	Alexey Alipov	Russia	124	25	149	=OR
2nd place, silver medalist(s)	Giovanni Pellielo	Italy	122	24	146	
3rd place, bronze medalist(s)	Adam Vella	Australia	121	24	145	
4	Ahmed Al Maktoum	United Arab Emirates	121	23	144	
5	Lance Bade	United States	122	21	143	
6	Khaled Al-Mudhaf	Kuwait	121	20	141	
