= Shooting at the 2020 Summer Olympics – Men's trap =

Men's trap at the Games of the XXXII Olympiad
- Olympic shooting pictogram
- Venue: Asaka Shooting Range
- Dates: 28 July 2021 (qualifying course 1); 29 July 2021 (qualifying course 2 and final)
- Competitors: 29 from 23 nations

Medalists
1st place, gold medalist(s)		Jiří Lipták	Czech Republic
2nd place, silver medalist(s)		David Kostelecký	Czech Republic
3rd place, bronze medalist(s)		Matthew Coward-Holley	Great Britain

The men's ISSF Olympic trap event at the 2020 Summer Olympics took place on 28 and 29 July 2021 at the Asaka Shooting Range. Approximately 30 sport shooters from 20 nations are expected to compete in the trap, with the precise number depending on how many shooters compete in multiple events.

== Background ==
This was the 23rd appearance of the men's Olympic trap event. The event had been held at every Summer Olympics from 1896 to 1924 (except 1904, when no shooting events were held) and from 1952 to 2016; it was open to women from 1968 to 1992.

Of the six semifinalists from 2016, none have yet been announced as a returning competitor. 2016 gold medalist Josip Glasnović of Croatia and bronze medalist David Kostelecký of the Czech Republic have earned qualifying places for their nations, but the nations have not announced who they have selected to compete. Silver medalist (and 2000–2008 medalist) Giovanni Pellielo and sixth-place finisher (and 2012 silver medalist) Massimo Fabbrizi are from Italy, which has earned a qualifying place but has not announced its selectee.

World champions since the 2016 Games have been Daniele Resca of Italy (2017), Alberto Fernández of Spain (2018), and Matthew Coward-Holley of Great Britain (2019). Coward-Holley has been named as one of Great Britain's two competitors. Italy and Spain have not announced their competitors.

No nations among those qualified are making their debut in the event. Great Britain has earned qualifying spots and is expected to make its 21st appearance, most of any nation.

== Qualification ==
Each National Olympic Committee (NOC) can enter up to two shooters if the NOC earns enough quota sports or has enough double starter-qualified shooters. To compete, a shooter needs a quota spot and to achieve a Minimum Qualification Score (MQS). Once a shooter is using a quota spot in any shooting event, they can enter any other shooting event for which they have achieved the MQS as well (a double starter qualification). There are 29 quota spots available for the trap. They are: 4 for the 2018 World Championships, 8 for 2019 World Cup events, 13 from continental events (4 from Europe, 4 from the Americas, 3 from Asia, and 1 each from Africa and Oceania), 1 for the host nation (Japan), 2 from Tripartite Commission invitations, and 1 from world ranking.

The MQS for the men's trap for 2020 is 112.

The COVID-19 pandemic delayed some of the events for qualifying for shooting, though many had been complete before the effects were felt.

== Competition format ==
The competition will not continue to use the format introduced in 2016, with a qualifying round, semifinal, and finals. Instead, only qualification and final round remain.

In the qualifier, each shooter fires 5 sets of 25 targets in trap shooting, with 10 targets being thrown to the left, 10 to the right, and 5 straight-away in each set. The shooters can take two shots at each target. Six shooters advance to the final round.

The final round consists of 25 targets, after which the shooter with the lowest number of successful shots is eliminated (placing 6th in the overall competition standings). Then one shooter is eliminated after each round of 5 shots until only 2 shooters remain. The last two shooters then take 10 shots, making it 50 shots in total. Only one shot can be taken at each target in the final round.

Ties are broken using a shoot-off; additional shots are fired one at a time until there is no longer a tie.

== Records ==
Prior to this competition, the existing world and Olympic records were as follows.

Qualifying round
World record	Giovanni Pellielo (ITA)	125	Nicosia, Cyprus	1 April 1994
Olympic record	Michael Diamond (AUS)	125	London, United Kingdom	6 August 2012

== Schedule ==
The competition is held over two days, Wednesday, 28 July and Thursday, 29 July. The first part of the qualifying round is the first day (75 shots); the second part of the qualifying round (50 shots) as well as the final round is on the second day.

All times are Japan Standard Time (UTC+9)

Date	Time	Round
Wednesday, 28 July 2021	9:00	Qualifying: Course 1
Thursday, 29 July 2021	9:00	Qualifying: Course 2 Finals

== Results ==
=== Qualification ===
Rank	Athlete	Country	1	2	3	4	5	Total	Shoot-off	Notes
1	Jiří Lipták	Czech Republic	25	24	25	25	25	124		Q
2	Matthew Coward-Holley	Great Britain	24	24	25	25	25	123	+21	Q
3	Abdulrahman Al-Faihan	Kuwait	24	25	25	24	25	123	+20	Q
4	David Kostelecký	Czech Republic	25	24	24	25	25	123	+5	Q
5	Yu Haicheng	China	24	24	25	25	25	123	+2	Q
6	Jorge Orozco	Mexico	25	24	23	25	25	122	+17	Q
7	Talal Al-Rashidi	Kuwait	24	24	24	25	25	122	+16	
8	Aleksey Alipov	ROC	25	25	23	24	25	122	+10	
9	Alberto Fernández	Spain	23	25	25	24	25	122	+6	
10	Mauro De Filippis	Italy	25	24	25	23	25	122	+1	
11	Erik Varga	Slovakia	24	25	24	25	24	122	+1	
12	Brian Burrows	United States	25	24	23	24	25	121		
13	Mohammed Al-Rumaihi	Qatar	23	25	24	25	24	121		
14	Yang Kun-pi	Chinese Taipei	25	24	23	25	24	121		
15	Andreas Löw	Germany	24	24	25	24	24	121		
16	Abdel-Aziz Mehelba	Egypt	24	24	25	25	23	121		
17	Savate Sresthaporn	Thailand	24	25	25	24	23	121		
18	Gian Marco Berti	San Marino	25	25	24	24	23	121		
19	Ahmed Zaher	Egypt	22	24	25	25	24	120		
20	João Azevedo	Portugal	23	25	24	25	23	120 CB:12		
21	James Willett	Australia	23	25	24	25	23	120 CB:2		
22	Josip Glasnović	Croatia	24	24	25	24	23	120		
23	Aaron Heading	Great Britain	23	22	23	25	25	119		
24	Derrick Mein	United States	24	23	23	25	24	119		
25	Thomas Grice	Australia	25	22	24	25	23	119		
26	Derek Burnett	Ireland	22	24	24	24	24	118		
27	Alessandro de Souza Ferreira	Peru	24	22	25	23	24	118		
28	Andreas Makri	Cyprus	22	25	23	22	25	117		
29	Shigetaka Oyama	Japan	24	22	23	21	25	115		

=== Final ===
Rank	Athlete	Series						Shoot-off	Notes
Rank	Athlete	1	2	3	4	5	6	Shoot-off	Notes
1st place, gold medalist(s)	Jiří Lipták (CZE)	20	24	29	34	39	43	+7	OR
2nd place, silver medalist(s)	David Kostelecký (CZE)	23	28	32	36	38	43	+6	OR
3rd place, bronze medalist(s)	Matthew Coward-Holley (GBR)	21	25	29	33				
4	Jorge Orozco (MEX)	22	26	28					
5	Yu Haicheng (CHN)	19	24						
6	Abdulrahman Al-Faihan (KUW)	18							
