= 2016 European Shotgun Championships =

- Dates: 4 - 12 July
- Host city: Lonato del Garda, Italy
- Level: Senior
- Events: 12

The 2016 European Shotgun Championships was the 62nd edition of the global shotgun competition, European Shotgun Championships, organised by the European Shooting Confederation.

== Results ==
=== Men ===
Event	1st place, gold medalist(s)	2nd place, silver medalist(s)	3rd place, bronze medalist(s)
Trap (07.07)	Massimo Fabbrizi; Italy; 14+3 pts.	Josip Glasnović; Croatia; 14+2 pts.	João Azevedo; Portugal; 14 pts.
Trap (team)	Croatia; Josip Glasnović; Giovanni Cernogoraz; Kristijan Kancelar 360	Czech Republic; Jiří Lipták; David Kostelecký; Jan Borkovec 358	Italy; Massimo Fabbrizi; Daniele Resca; Giovanni Pellielo; 356
Double trap (11.07)	Vasily Mosin; Russia; 30	Daniele Di Spigno; Italy; 29	Matthew Coward-Holley; Great Britain; 29
Double trap (team)	Great Britain; Matthew Coward-Holley; Tim Kneale; Steven Scott; 413	Italy; Daniele Di Spigno; Marco Innocenti; Antonino Barilla; 408	Hungary; Roland Gerebics; Richárd Bognár; Andras Palkovics; 388
Skeet (10.07)	Riccardo Filippelli; Italy; 16	Sven Korte; Germany; 15	Ralf Buchheim; Germany; 13
Skeet (team)	Italy; Riccardo Filippelli; Luigi Lodde; Gabriele Rossetti; 371	Czech Republic; Tomáš Nýdrle; Jan Sychra; Miloš Slavíček; 367	Germany; Ralf Buchheim; Sven Korte; Vincent Haaga; 364

=== Women ===
No medals awarded owing to lack to entries

Event	1st place, gold medalist(s)	2nd place, silver medalist(s)	3rd place, bronze medalist(s)
Trap (06.07)	Zuzana Štefečeková; Slovakia; 15 pts.	Silvana Stanco; Italy; 13 pts.	Fátima Gálvez; Spain; 12 pts.
Trap (team)	Italy; Alessia Iezzi; Silvana Stanco; Jessica Rossi; 212	France; Marina Sauzet; Carole Cormenier; Mélanie Couzy; 207	Spain; Fátima Gálvez; Beatriz Martínez; María Quintanal; 198
Double trap (11.07)	Rachel Parish; Great Britain; 98	Lilia Valeeva; Russia; 86	Monica Girotto; Italy; 81
Skeet (09.07)	Chiara Cainero; Italy; 15	Konstantía Nikoláu; Cyprus; 12	Vanessa Hauff; Germany; 13
Skeet (team)	Cyprus; Konstantía Nikoláu; Andri Eleftheriou; Panayiota Andreou; 209	Italy; Chiara Cainero; Diana Bacosi; Katiuscia Spada; 205	Slovakia; Danka Barteková; Andrea Stranovská; Veronika Sýkorová; 204

=== Mixed ===
Event	1st place, gold medalist(s)	2nd place, silver medalist(s)	3rd place, bronze medalist(s)
Trap team (08.07)	Yelena Tkach; Alexei Alipov; Russia; 29 pts.	Ana Rita Rodrigues; José Manuel Bruno Fária; Portugal; 27 pts.	Katrin Quooß; Karsten Bindrich; Germany; 23 pts.
Skeet team (12.07)	Ricardo Filippelli; Diana Bacosi; Italy; 25 pts.	Anthony Terras; Lucie Anastassiou; France; 24 pts.	Jan Sychra; Libuše Jahodová; Czech Republic; 30 pts.

== Medal table ==
#	Country	1st place, gold medalist(s)	2nd place, silver medalist(s)	3rd place, bronze medalist(s)	Tot.
1	Italy	6	4	1	11
2	Russia	2	0	0	2
3	Cyprus	1	1	0	2
3	Croatia	1	1	0	2
5	Slovakia	1	0	1	2
5	Great Britain	1	0	1	2
7	Czech Republic	0	2	1	3
8	France	0	2	0	2
9	Germany	0	1	4	5
10	Portugal	0	1	1	2
11	Spain	0	0	2	2
12	Hungary	0	0	1	1
	TOTAL	12	12	12	36

== See also ==
- Shotgun
- European Shooting Confederation
- International Shooting Sport Federation
