= Shooting at the 2019 European Games – Men's trap =

Men's trap at the 2019 European Games
- Venue: Sporting Club
- Dates: 22–23 June
- Competitors: 32 from 21 nations

Medalists
gold medal	David Kostelecký	Czech Republic
silver medal	Valerio Grazini	Italy
bronze medal	Aaron Heading	Great Britain

The men's trap event at the 2019 European Games in Minsk, Belarus took place from 22 to 23 June at the Sporting Club.

== Schedule ==
All times are FET (UTC+03:00)

Date	Time	Event
Saturday, 22 June 2019	09:00	Qualification day 1
Sunday, 23 June 2019	09:00	Qualification day 2
Sunday, 23 June 2019	17:00	Final

== Records ==
Prior to this competition, the existing world, European and Games records were as follows.

Qualification
World Record	Giovanni Pellielo (ITA)	125	Nicosia, Cyprus	1 April 1994
European Record	Giovanni Pellielo (ITA)	125	Nicosia, Cyprus	1 April 1994
Games Record	Aleksey Alipov (RUS); Erik Varga (SVK)	123	Baku, Azerbaijan	17 June 2015
Final
World Record	Alberto Fernández (ESP)	48	New Delhi, India	29 October 2017
European Record	Alberto Fernández (ESP)	48	New Delhi, India	29 October 2017
Games Record	—	—	—	—

== Results ==
=== Qualification ===
The qualification round took place on 22 and 23 June to determine the qualifiers for the finals.

Rank	Athlete	Country	Day 1	Day 2	Total	S-off	Notes
1	Jiří Lipták	Czech Republic	74	49	123		Q, =GR
2	Valerio Grazini	Italy	72	48	120		Q
3	David Kostelecký	Czech Republic	72	47	119	+2	Q
4	Giovanni Cernogoraz	Croatia	73	46	119	+1	Q
5	Aleksey Alipov	Russia	72	46	118	+3	Q
6	Aaron Heading	Great Britain	71	47	118	+2	Q
7	Erik Varga	Slovakia	70	48	118	+0	
8	Denis Vatovec	Slovenia	71	46	117		
9	Giovanni Pellielo	Italy	73	44	117		
10	Anton Glasnović	Croatia	70	46	116		
11	Yannick Peeters	Belgium	71	45	116		
12	Marián Kovačócy	Slovakia	70	45	115		
13	Borko Vasiljević	Serbia	66	48	114		
14	Tolga Tuncer	Turkey	71	43	114		
15	Lyndon Sosa	Luxembourg	72	42	114		
16	Alberto Fernández	Spain	66	47	113		
17	Sébastien Guerrero	France	69	44	113		
18	Antonio Bailón	Spain	67	45	112		
19	Antonin Desert	France	67	45	112		
20	Ali Huseynli	Azerbaijan	68	44	112		
21	Yavuz İlnam	Turkey	71	41	112		
22	Andreas Löw	Germany	68	43	111		
23	Andreas Makri	Cyprus	67	43	110		
24	Matthew Coward-Holley	Great Britain	68	41	109		
25	Boštjan Maček	Slovenia	63	44	107		
26	Piotr Kowalczyk	Poland	65	42	107		
27	João Azevedo	Portugal	69	38	107		
28	Paul Pigorsch	Germany	67	49	106		
29	Maxime Mottet	Belgium	65	40	105		
30	Gian Marco Berti	San Marino	60	43	103		
31	Derek Burnett	Ireland	65	37	102		
32	Vesa Törnroos	Finland	57	40	97		

=== Final ===
The final round took place on 23 June to determine the final classification.

Rank	Athlete	Series										S-off	Notes
Rank	Athlete	1	2	3	4	5	6	7	8	9	10	S-off	Notes
1st place, gold medalist(s)	David Kostelecký (CZE)	5	10	15	20	25	29	33	37	40	44		GR
2nd place, silver medalist(s)	Valerio Grazini (ITA)	4	8	13	18	23	26	31	35	39	42		
3rd place, bronze medalist(s)	Aaron Heading (GBR)	4	9	13	17	21	26	30	34				
4	Jiří Lipták (CZE)	5	10	14	17	20	24	28					
5	Aleksey Alipov (RUS)	3	6	10	15	19	24						
6	Giovanni Cernogoraz (CRO)	2	6	9	14	18							
