= 2001 ISSF World Cup =

For the 2001 ISSF World Cup in the seventeen Olympic shooting events, the World Cup Final was held in August 2001 in Munich, Germany for the rifle, pistol and running target events, and in January 2002 in Doha, Qatar for the shotgun events. The shotgun final was originally planned for November 2001 but was rescheduled after the September 11, 2001 attacks, leading to the first time ever a World Cup season overflowed into the next calendar year.

== Rifle, pistol and running target ==
=== Men's individual ===
10m Air Rifle
Stage	Venue	1st place, gold medalist(s)	2nd place, silver medalist(s)	3rd place, bronze medalist(s)
1	(United States) Atlanta	Jozef Gönci (SVK)	Dick Boschman (NED)	Mario Knögler (AUT)
2	(South Korea) Seoul	Leif Rolland (NOR)	Zhang Fu (CHN)	Thomas Farnik (AUT)
3	(Italy) Milan	Jozef Gönci (SVK)	Tevarit Majchacheep (THA)	Dick Boschman (NED)
4	(Germany) Munich	Leif Rolland (NOR)	Qiu Jian (CHN)	Abhinav Bindra (IND)
Final	(Germany) Munich	Qiu Jian (CHN)	Leif Rolland (NOR)	Dick Boschman (NED)

50m Rifle 3 Positions
Stage	Venue	1st place, gold medalist(s)	2nd place, silver medalist(s)	3rd place, bronze medalist(s)
1	(United States) Atlanta	Jozef Gönci (SVK)	Anatoli Klimenko (BLR)	Christian Klees (GER)
2	(South Korea) Seoul	Artur Ayvazyan (UKR)	Artyom Khadjibekov (RUS)	Park Bong-duk (KOR)
3	(Italy) Milan	Jason Parker (USA)	Jury Sukhorukov (UKR)	Johann Zähringer (GER)
4	(Germany) Munich	Jozef Gönci (SVK)	Artyom Khadjibekov (RUS)	Maik Eckhardt (GER)
Final	(Germany) Munich	Artyom Khadjibekov (RUS)	Jozef Gönci (SVK)	Artur Ayvazyan (UKR)

50m Rifle Prone
Stage	Venue	1st place, gold medalist(s)	2nd place, silver medalist(s)	3rd place, bronze medalist(s)
1	(United States) Atlanta	Harald Stenvaag (NOR)	Sergei Martynov (BLR)	Artur Ayvazyan (UKR)
2	(South Korea) Seoul	Mario Knögler (AUT)	Artyom Khadjibekov (RUS)	Ken Johnson (USA)
3	(Italy) Milan	Sergei Martynov (BLR)	Marco De Nicolo (ITA)	Valérian Sauveplane (FRA)
4	(Germany) Munich	Ernst Rolffs (NED)	Mario Knögler (AUT)	Matthew Emmons (USA)
Final	(Germany) Munich	Jonas Edman (SWE)	Harald Stenvaag (NOR)	Sergei Martynov (BLR)

10m Air Pistol
Stage	Venue	1st place, gold medalist(s)	2nd place, silver medalist(s)	3rd place, bronze medalist(s)
1	(United States) Atlanta	Igor Basinski (BLR)	Roberto Di Donna (ITA)	Alexander Danilov (ISR)
2	(South Korea) Seoul	Dionysios Georgakopoulos (GRE)	Jakkrit Panichpatikum (THA)	João Costa (POR)
3	(Italy) Milan	Vladimir Guchsha (KAZ)	Kanstantsin Lukashyk (BLR)	Vigilio Fait (ITA)
4	(Germany) Munich	Boris Kokorev (RUS)	Jerzy Pietrzak (POL)	Vladimir Gontcharov (RUS)
Final	(Germany) Munich	Franck Dumoulin (FRA)	Boris Kokorev (RUS)	Alexander Danilov (ISR)

25m Rapid Fire Pistol
Stage	Venue	1st place, gold medalist(s)	2nd place, silver medalist(s)	3rd place, bronze medalist(s)
1	(United States) Atlanta	Daniel César Felizia (ARG)	Emil Milev (BUL)	Shen Jianfeng (CHN)
2	(South Korea) Seoul	Lee Sang-hak (KOR)	Sergei Alifirenko (RUS)	Ji Haiping (CHN)
3	(Italy) Milan	Ralf Schumann (GER)	Iulian Raicea (ROU)	Taras Magmet (UKR)
4	(Germany) Munich	Ralf Schumann (GER)	Zuo Zhong (CHN)	Aleh Khvatsavas (BLR)
Final	(Germany) Munich	Ji Haiping (CHN)	Iulian Raicea (ROU)	Emil Milev (BUL)

50m Pistol
Stage	Venue	1st place, gold medalist(s)	2nd place, silver medalist(s)	3rd place, bronze medalist(s)
1	(United States) Atlanta	Dilshod Mukhtarov (UZB)	Igor Basinski (BLR)	Alexander Danilov (ISR)
2	(South Korea) Seoul	Mikhail Nestruyev (RUS)	Vladimir Gontcharov (RUS)	Li Huaiyu (CHN)
3	(Italy) Milan	Paweł Borowicki (POL)	Kanstantsin Lukashyk (BLR)	Wojciech Knapik (POL)
4	(Germany) Munich	Mikhail Nestruyev (RUS)	Martin Tenk (CZE)	Wojciech Knapik (POL)
Final	(Germany) Munich	Mikhail Nestruyev (RUS)	Dilshod Mukhtarov (UZB)	Martin Tenk (CZE)

10m Running Target
Stage	Venue	1st place, gold medalist(s)	2nd place, silver medalist(s)	3rd place, bronze medalist(s)
1	(United States) Atlanta	Manfred Kurzer (GER)	Marko Schulze (GER)	Niu Zhiyuan (CHN)
2	(South Korea) Seoul	Alexander Blinov (RUS)	Andrés Felipe Torres (COL)	Dimitri Lykin (RUS)
3	(Italy) Milan	Manfred Kurzer (GER)	Ľubomír Pelach (SVK)	Niklas Bergström (SWE)
4	(Germany) Munich	Niu Zhiyuan (CHN)	Miroslav Januš (CZE)	Manfred Kurzer (GER)
Final	(Germany) Munich	Manfred Kurzer (GER)	Yang Ling (CHN)	Niu Zhiyuan (CHN)

=== Women's individual ===
10m Air Rifle
Stage	Venue	1st place, gold medalist(s)	2nd place, silver medalist(s)	3rd place, bronze medalist(s)
1	(United States) Atlanta	Kim Hyung-mi (KOR)	Gao Jing (CHN)	Kim Sun-hwa (KOR)
2	(South Korea) Seoul	Lu Yadian (CHN)	Li Ling (CHN)	Marina Bobkova (RUS)
3	(Italy) Milan	Sonja Pfeilschifter (GER)	Choi Dae-young (KOR)	Emily Caruso (USA)
4	(Germany) Munich	Kateřina Beranová (CZE)	Gabriele Bühlmann (SUI)	Sonja Pfeilschifter (GER)
Final	(Germany) Munich	Sonja Pfeilschifter (GER)	Choi Dae-young (KOR)	Kim Hyung-mi (KOR)

50m Rifle 3 Positions
Stage	Venue	1st place, gold medalist(s)	2nd place, silver medalist(s)	3rd place, bronze medalist(s)
1	(United States) Atlanta	Alexandra Schneider (GER)	Zhao Yinghui (CHN)	Emily Caruso (USA)
2	(South Korea) Seoul	Lessia Leskiv (UKR)	Emily Caruso (USA)	Wee Myung-joo (KOR)
3	(Italy) Milan	Gabriele Bühlmann (SUI)	Olga Pogrebnyak (BLR)	Emily Caruso (USA)
4	(Germany) Munich	Wang Xian (CHN)	Lessia Leskiv (UKR)	Jia Ying (CHN)
Final	(Germany) Munich	Shan Hong (CHN)	Wang Xian (CHN)	Mladenka Malenica (CRO)

10m Air Pistol
Stage	Venue	1st place, gold medalist(s)	2nd place, silver medalist(s)	3rd place, bronze medalist(s)
1	(United States) Atlanta	Tao Luna (CHN)	Susanne Meyerhoff (DEN)	Kim Soo-hyun (KOR)
2	(South Korea) Seoul	Ren Jie (CHN)	Svetlana Smirnova (RUS)	Park Jung-hee (KOR)
3	(Italy) Milan	Brigitte Roy (FRA)	Olena Kostevych (UKR)	Michela Suppo (ITA)
4	(Germany) Munich	Olga Kuznetsova (RUS)	Tao Luna (CHN)	Svetlana Smirnova (RUS)
Final	(Germany) Munich	Ren Jie (CHN)	Susanne Meyerhoff (DEN)	Svetlana Smirnova (RUS)

25m Pistol
Stage	Venue	1st place, gold medalist(s)	2nd place, silver medalist(s)	3rd place, bronze medalist(s)
1	(United States) Atlanta	Tao Luna (CHN)	Chen Ying (CHN)	Elizabeth Callahan (USA)
2	(South Korea) Seoul	Tao Luna (CHN)	Chen Ying (CHN)	Natalia Akhmertdinova (RUS)
3	(Italy) Milan	Julita Macur (POL)	Nino Salukvadze (GEO)	Olena Kostevych (UKR)
4	(Germany) Munich	Tao Luna (CHN)	Irina Dolgatcheva (RUS)	Cho Mi-kyung (KOR)
Final	(Germany) Munich	Tao Luna (CHN)	Chen Ying (CHN)	Svetlana Smirnova (RUS)

== Shotgun ==
=== Men's individual ===
Trap
Stage	Venue	1st place, gold medalist(s)	2nd place, silver medalist(s)	3rd place, bronze medalist(s)
1	(Cyprus) Nicosia	Carlo Angelantoni (ITA)	Michael Diamond (AUS)	Karsten Bindrich (GER)
2	(South Korea) Seoul	Glenn Kable (FIJ)	Dominic Grazioli (USA)	Aleksey Alipov (RUS)
3	(Italy) Lonato	Michael Diamond (AUS)	Glenn Kable (FIJ)	Giovanni Pellielo (ITA)
4	(Brazil) Americana	Dominic Grazioli (USA)	Ahmed Al-Maktoum (UAE)	Erminio Frasca (ITA)
Final	(Qatar) Doha	Giovanni Pellielo (ITA)	Michael Diamond (AUS)	Dominic Grazioli (USA)

Double Trap
Stage	Venue	1st place, gold medalist(s)	2nd place, silver medalist(s)	3rd place, bronze medalist(s)
1	(Cyprus) Nicosia	Daniele Di Spigno (ITA)	Roland Gerebics (HUN)	Hamad Alafasi (KUW)
2	(South Korea) Seoul	Walton Eller (USA)	Fehaid Al-Deehani (KUW)	Ahmed Al-Maktoum (UAE)
3	(Italy) Lonato	Li Shuangchun (CHN)	Raimo Kauppila (FIN)	Hamad Alafasi (KUW)
4	(Brazil) Americana	Daniele Di Spigno (ITA)	Charles Redding (USA)	Adam Vella (AUS)
Final	(Qatar) Doha	Walton Eller (USA)	Li Bo (CHN)	Fehaid Al-Deehani (KUW)

Skeet
Stage	Venue	1st place, gold medalist(s)	2nd place, silver medalist(s)	3rd place, bronze medalist(s)
1	(Cyprus) Nicosia	Bronislav Bechyňský (CZE)	Hennie Dompeling (NED)	Erik Watndal (NOR)
2	(South Korea) Seoul	Aleksey Skorobogatov (RUS)	Saeed Al-Maktoum (UAE)	Kyriacos Christoforou (CYP)
3	(Italy) Lonato	Harald Jensen (NOR)	Nasser Al-Attiyah (QAT)	Jan-Henrik Heinrich (GER)
4	(Brazil) Americana	Joseph Buffa (USA)	Ennio Falco (ITA)	Hennie Dompeling (NED)
Final	(Qatar) Doha	Ennio Falco (ITA)	Marko Kemppainen (FIN)	Joseph Buffa (USA)

=== Women's individual ===
Trap
Stage	Venue	1st place, gold medalist(s)	2nd place, silver medalist(s)	3rd place, bronze medalist(s)
1	(Cyprus) Nicosia	No event		
2	(South Korea) Seoul	Elena Tkach (RUS)	Keiko Suzu (JPN)	Diane Reeves (AUS)
3	(Italy) Lonato	Irina Laricheva (RUS)	Roberta Pelosi (ITA)	Susan Nattrass (CAN)
4	(Brazil) Americana	No event		
Final	(Qatar) Doha	Taeko Takeba (JPN)	Elena Tkach (RUS)	Suzanne Balogh (AUS)

Double Trap
Stage	Venue	1st place, gold medalist(s)	2nd place, silver medalist(s)	3rd place, bronze medalist(s)
1	(Cyprus) Nicosia	No event		
2	(South Korea) Seoul	Suzanne Balogh (AUS)	Lee Eun-sim (KOR)	Lin Yi-chun (TPE)
3	(Italy) Lonato	Pia Hansen (SWE)	Zhang Yafei (CHN)	Li Qingnian (CHN)
4	(Brazil) Americana	No event		
Final	(Qatar) Doha	Deborah Gelisio (ITA)	Wu Meng-ying (TPE)	Pia Hansen (SWE)

Skeet
Stage	Venue	1st place, gold medalist(s)	2nd place, silver medalist(s)	3rd place, bronze medalist(s)
1	(Cyprus) Nicosia	No event		
2	(South Korea) Seoul	Erdzhanik Avetisyan (RUS)	Zemfira Meftahatdinova (AZE)	Svetlana Demina (RUS)
3	(Italy) Lonato	Erdzhanik Avetisyan (RUS)	Svetlana Demina (RUS)	Wei Ning (CHN)
4	(Brazil) Americana	No event		
Final	(Qatar) Doha	Wei Ning (CHN)	Svetlana Demina (RUS)	Chiara Cainero (ITA)
