= 2002 European Shotgun Championships =

2002 European Shooting Championships
- Host city: Lonato del Garda, Italy
- Level: Senior
- Events: 30

The 2002 European Shooting Championships was the 48th edition (included of the European Shooting Championships), of the global shotgun competition, European Shotgun Championships, organised by the International Shooting Sport Federation.

== Winners ==
Events was 22, 12 men and 10 women.

=== Men ===
Event	Winner	Country
Air rifle	Péter Sidi	Hungary
Air pistols	Mikhail Nestruyev	Russia
Air rifle, team	(Konstantin Prichodschenko, Yevgeny Aleinikov, Yuri Fedkin)	Russia
Air pistol, team	(Mikhail Nestruyev, Boris Kokorev, Vladimir Goncharov)	Russia
Running disc, normal running	Dimitri Lykin	Russia
Running disc, acc. Run	Alexander Blinov	Russia
Running disc, normal run, team	(Alexander Blinov, Dimitri Lykin, Yuri Ermolenko)	Russia
Running disc, acc. Run, team	(Alexander Blinov, Dimitri Lykin, Yuri Ermolenko)	Russia
Trap	David Kostelecky	Czechoslovakia
Trap team	(Giovanni Pellielo, Marco Venturini, Rodolfo Viganò)	Italy
Doppeltrap	Daniele Di Spigno	Italy
Doppeltrap team	(Emanuele Bernasconi, Daniele Di Spigno, Marco Innocenti)	Italy
Skeet	Ennio Falco	Italy
Skeet team	(Tore Brovold, Harald Jensen, Erik Watndahl)	Norway

=== Women ===
Event	Winner	Country
Air rifle	Sonja Pfeilschifter	Germany
Air pistol	Susanne Meyerhoff	Germany
Air rifle, team	(Ljubow Galkina, Marina Bobkowa, Jelena Pugatschewa)	Russia
Air pistol, team	(Olga Kusnetzowa, Svetlana Smirnowa, Galina Beljajewa)	Russia
Running disc, normal running	Galina Avranenko	Ukraine
Running disc, mixed run	Audrey Soquet	France
Running disc, normal run, team	(Galina Avramenko, Ganna Patsora, Kateryna Samohina)	Ukraine
Running disc, mixed run, team	(Galina Avramenko, Ganna Patsora, Kateryna Samohina)	Ukraine
Trap	Maria Quintanal	Spain
Trap team	(Irina Laritschewa, Jelena Tkatsch, Maria Sub)	Russia
Doppeltrap	Deborah Gelisio	Italy
Doppeltrap team	(Deborah Gelisio, Nadia Innocenti, Giovanna Pasello)	Italy
Skeet	Erdzhanik Avetisyan	Russia
Skeet team	(Erdzhanik Avetisyan, Swetlana Demina, Olga Panarina)	Russia

== See also ==
- European Shooting Confederation
- International Shooting Sport Federation
- List of medalists at the European Shooting Championship
