= Scalzone =

Scalzone is an Italian surname. Notable people with the surname include:

- Alfonso Scalzone (born 1996), Italian rower
- Angelo Scalzone (1931–1987), Italian sports shooter
- Roberto Scalzone (1962–2019), Italian sports shooter
- Oreste Scalzone (born 1947), Italian Marxist intellectual
