= Shooting at the 2012 Summer Olympics – Men's trap =

Men's trap at the Games of the XXX Olympiad
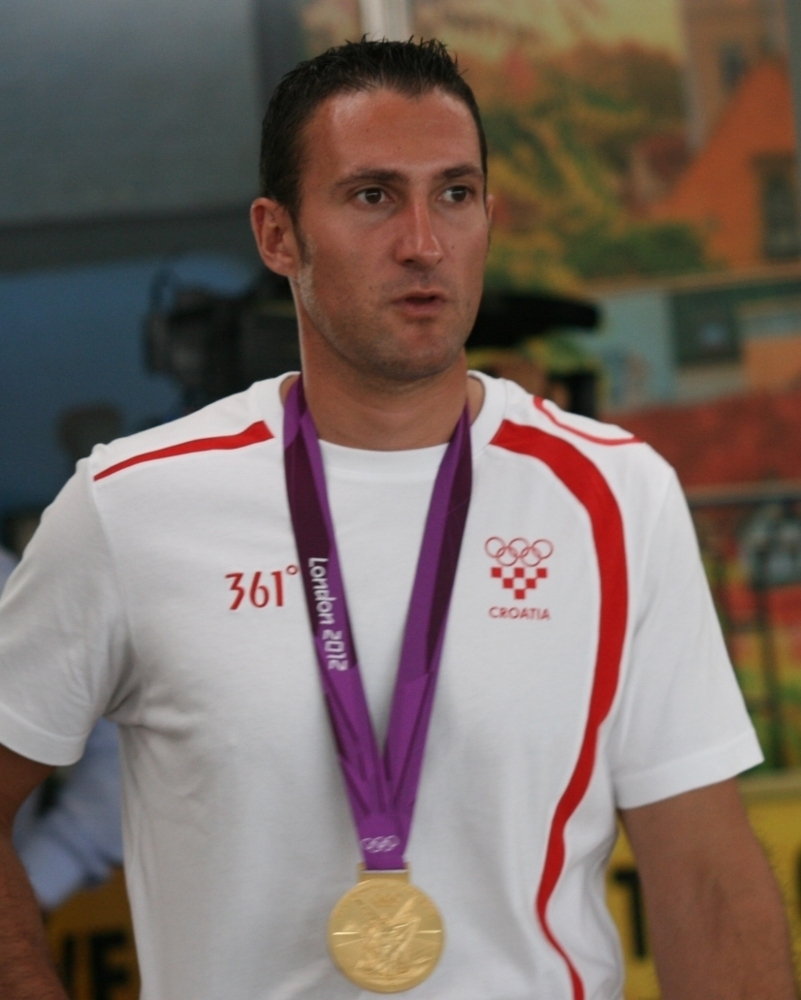
- Gold medalist Giovanni Cernogoraz
- Venue: Royal Artillery Barracks
- Dates: 5 August 2012; 6 August 2012
- Competitors: 34 from 27 nations
- Winning score: 146 =OR

Medalists
| 1st place, gold medalist(s) | | Giovanni Cernogoraz | Croatia |
| 2nd place, silver medalist(s) | | Massimo Fabbrizi | Italy |
| 3rd place, bronze medalist(s) | | Fehaid Al-Deehani | Kuwait |

The men's trap event at the 2012 Olympic Games took place on 5 and 6 August 2012 at the Royal Artillery Barracks. There were 34 competitors from 27 nations. The event was won by Giovanni Cernogoraz of Croatia, the nation's first medal in the men's trap. Massimo Fabbrizi of Italy took silver, the third consecutive silver and fourth Games on the podium for Italy (Giovanni Pellielo had taken bronze in 2000 and silver in 2004 and 2008; he finished 8th this year, but would be back to win another silver in 2016). Kuwait, like Croatia, earned its first medal in the men's trap; Fehaid Al-Deehani took bronze.

== Background ==
This was the 21st appearance of the men's ISSF Olympic trap event. The event was held at every Summer Olympics from 1896 to 1924 (except 1904, when no shooting events were held) and from 1952 to 2016. As with most shooting events, it was nominally open to women from 1968 to 1980; the trap remained open to women through 1992. Very few women participated these years. The event returned to being men-only for 1996, though the new double trap had separate events for men and women that year. In 2000, a separate women's event was added and it has been contested at every Games since. There was also a men's team trap event held four times from 1908 to 1924.

Five of the 6 finalists from the 2008 Games returned: gold medalist David Kostelecký of the Czech Republic, silver medalist (and 2000 bronze and 2004 silver medalist) Giovanni Pellielo of Italy, bronze medalist (and 2004 gold medalist) Aleksei Alipov of Russia, fourth-place finisher (and 1996 and 2000 gold medalist) Michael Diamond of Australia, and fifth-place finisher Josip Glasnović of Croatia. Two of the last three World Champions were also competing: Alberto Fernández of Spain (2010) and Massimo Fabbrizi of Italy (2011).

Belarus and Qatar each made their debut in the event. France and Great Britain each made their 19th appearance, tied for most among nations.

== Qualification ==
Each National Olympic Committee (NOC) could enter up to two shooters if the NOC earned enough quota sports or had enough crossover-qualified shooters. To compete, a shooter needed a quota spot and to achieve a Minimum Qualification Score (MQS). Once a shooter was using a quota spot in any shooting event, they could enter any other shooting event for which they had achieved the MQS as well (a crossover qualification). There were 33 quota spots available for the trap event: 1 for the host nation, 5 at the 2010 World Championships, 2 at the 2010 American continental championships, 8 at the 2011 World Cup events, 1 at the 2010 African championships, 5 at the 2011 European championships, 1 at the 2011 World Championships, 1 at the 2011 Pan American Games, 2 at the 2011 Oceania championships, 4 at the 2012 Asian championships, 1 invitational place, and 2 reallocated quota. There was also 1 cross-over spot used, by Fehaid Al-Deehani (qualified in double trap).

== Competition format ==
The competition used the two-round 125+25 format introduced in 1996. A small but significant change had been introduced by a 2005 rules change, however; only one shot per target was allowed in the final round (rather than the two still used in qualifying and previously used in the final).

The event consisted of two rounds: a qualifier and a final. In the qualifier, each shooter fired 5 sets of 25 targets in trap shooting, with 10 targets being thrown to the left, 10 to the right, and 5 straight-away in each set. The shooters could take two shots at each target.

The top 6 shooters in the qualifying round moved on to the final round. There, they fired one additional round of 25 targets, where only one shot could be taken at each target. The total score from all 150 targets was used to determine final ranking. Ties were broken using a shoot-off; additional shots are fired one at a time until there is no longer a tie.

== Records ==
Prior to this competition, the existing world and Olympic records were as follows.

Qualifying round
| World record | Giovanni Pellielo (ITA) | 125 | Nicosia, Cyprus | 1 April 1994 |
| Olympic record | Michael Diamond (AUS); Aleksei Alipov (RUS) | 124 | Atlanta, United States; Athens, Greece | 21 July 1996; 15 August 2004 |

Final round
| World record | Karsten Bindrich (GER) | 149 (124+25) | Nicosia, Cyprus | 10 July 2008 |
| Olympic record | David Kostelecký (CZE) | 146 (121+25) | Beijing, China | 10 August 2008 |

Michael Diamond set the new Olympic record with a perfect qualifying round. Giovanni Cernogoraz and Massimo Fabbrizi both equaled the Olympic record for a combined final with 146.

== Schedule ==
All times are British Summer Time (UTC+1)

| Date | Time | Round |
|---|---|---|
| Sunday, 5 August 2012 | 9:00 | Qualifying: Course 1 |
| Monday, 6 August 2012 | 9:00; 16:00 | Qualifying: Course 2 Final |

== Results ==
=== Qualifying round ===
| Rank | Shooter | Nation | 1 | 2 | 3 | Day 1 | 4 | 5 | Total | Notes |
|---|---|---|---|---|---|---|---|---|---|---|
| 1 | Michael Diamond | Australia | 25 | 25 | 25 | 75 | 25 | 25 | 125 | Q, OR |
| 2 | Fehaid Al-Deehani | Kuwait | 25 | 24 | 25 | 74 | 25 | 25 | 124 | Q |
| 3 | Jesús Serrano | Spain | 24 | 25 | 24 | 73 | 25 | 25 | 123 | Q |
| 4 | Massimo Fabbrizi | Italy | 25 | 24 | 25 | 74 | 24 | 25 | 123 | Q |
| 5 | Anton Glasnović | Croatia | 25 | 24 | 25 | 74 | 24 | 24 | 122 | Q |
| 6 | Giovanni Cernogoraz | Croatia | 25 | 25 | 24 | 74 | 24 | 24 | 122 | Q |
| 7 | Boštjan Maček | Slovenia | 24 | 23 | 25 | 72 | 24 | 24 | 121 | |
| 8 | Giovanni Pellielo | Italy | 23 | 25 | 24 | 72 | 24 | 25 | 121 | |
| 9 | Maxim Kosarev | Russia | 23 | 25 | 25 | 73 | 24 | 24 | 121 | |
| 10 | Rashid Hamad Al-Athba | Qatar | 24 | 25 | 24 | 73 | 24 | 24 | 121 | |
| 11 | Karsten Bindrich | Germany | 24 | 25 | 25 | 74 | 23 | 23 | 121 | |
| 12 | Erik Varga | Slovakia | 24 | 25 | 24 | 73 | 25 | 23 | 121 | |
| 13 | Aleksei Alipov | Russia | 24 | 22 | 25 | 71 | 25 | 24 | 120 | |
| 14 | David Kostelecký | Czech Republic | 24 | 24 | 25 | 73 | 25 | 22 | 120 | |
| 15 | Adam Vella | Australia | 23 | 23 | 23 | 69 | 25 | 25 | 119 | |
| 16 | Manavjit Singh Sandhu | India | 24 | 24 | 22 | 70 | 25 | 24 | 119 | |
| 17 | Andreas Scherhaufer | Austria | 25 | 24 | 23 | 72 | 23 | 24 | 119 | |
| 18 | Jiří Lipták | Czech Republic | 24 | 24 | 25 | 73 | 23 | 23 | 119 | |
| 19 | Stéphane Clamens | France | 23 | 25 | 25 | 73 | 24 | 22 | 119 | |
| 20 | Sergio Piñero | Dominican Republic | 22 | 25 | 25 | 72 | 23 | 23 | 118 | |
| 21 | Edward Ling | Great Britain | 23 | 24 | 25 | 72 | 25 | 21 | 118 | |
| 22 | Ahmed Zaher | Egypt | 23 | 22 | 23 | 68 | 24 | 25 | 117 | |
| 23 | Glenn Kable | Fiji | 23 | 22 | 24 | 69 | 24 | 24 | 117 | |
| 24 | Oğuzhan Tüzün | Turkey | 23 | 23 | 25 | 71 | 24 | 22 | 117 | |
| 25 | Alberto Fernández | Spain | 22 | 23 | 25 | 70 | 23 | 23 | 116 | |
| 26 | Talal Al-Rashidi | Kuwait | 24 | 23 | 23 | 70 | 23 | 23 | 116 | |
| 27 | Derek Burnett | Ireland | 24 | 23 | 23 | 70 | 23 | 23 | 116 | |
| 28 | Jean Pierre Brol | Guatemala | 25 | 22 | 24 | 71 | 22 | 23 | 116 | |
| 29 | Danilo Caro | Colombia | 24 | 23 | 22 | 69 | 24 | 22 | 115 | |
| 30 | Du Yu | China | 22 | 23 | 22 | 67 | 22 | 23 | 112 | |
| 31 | Juan Carlos Pérez | Bolivia | 23 | 22 | 23 | 68 | 21 | 21 | 110 | |
| 32 | Dhaher Al-Aryani | United Arab Emirates | 21 | 21 | 23 | 65 | 23 | 19 | 107 | |
| 33 | Joan Tomas Roca | Andorra | 21 | 19 | 20 | 60 | 21 | 22 | 103 | |
| 34 | Andrei Kavalenka | Belarus | 24 | 16 | 19 | 59 | 23 | 19 | 101 | |

=== Final ===
| Rank | Shooter | Nation | Qual | Final | Total | Shoot-off | Notes |
|---|---|---|---|---|---|---|---|
| 1st place, gold medalist(s) | Giovanni Cernogoraz | Croatia | 122 | 24 | 146 | 6 | =OR |
| 2nd place, silver medalist(s) | Massimo Fabbrizi | Italy | 123 | 23 | 146 | 5 | =OR |
| 3rd place, bronze medalist(s) | Fehaid Al-Deehani | Kuwait | 124 | 21 | 145 | 4 | |
| 4 | Michael Diamond | Australia | 125 | 20 | 145 | 3 | |
| 5 | Jesús Serrano | Spain | 123 | 21 | 144 | —N/a | |
| 6 | Anton Glasnović | Croatia | 122 | 21 | 143 | —N/a | |
