= 2001 World Cup =

2001 World Cup can refer to:

- The 2001 Alpine Skiing World Cup
- 2001 Baseball World Cup
- 2001 Rugby World Cup Sevens
- 2001 ISSF World Cup
- 2001 Speedway World Cup

== See also ==
- 2001 Continental Championships (disambiguation)
- 2001 World Championships (disambiguation)
- 2001 World Junior Championships (disambiguation)
