= Kosarev =

Kosarev (Russian: Косарев) is a Russian masculine surname; its feminine counterpart is Kosareva. Notable people with the surname include:

- Aleksandr Kosarev (volleyball) (born 1977), Russian volleyball player
- Maxim Kosarev (born 1969), Russian trap shooter
- Aleksandr Kosarev (politician) (1903 – 1939), Russian Communist Party official, better known as first secretary of the Komsomol Central Committee
