= 2001 World Junior Championships =

2001 World Junior Championships may refer to:

- Figure skating: 2001 World Junior Figure Skating Championships
- Ice hockey: 2001 World Junior Ice Hockey Championships
- Motorcycle speedway: 2001 Individual Speedway Junior World Championship

== See also ==
- 2001 World Cup (disambiguation)
- 2001 Continental Championships (disambiguation)
- 2001 World Championships (disambiguation)
