= Shigetaka Oyama =

Japanese sports shooter

Personal information
- Nationality: Japanese
- Born: 25 August 1981 (age 44) Toda, Saitama, Japan
- Height: 165 cm (5 ft 5 in)
- Weight: 64 kg (141 lb)

Sport
- Sport: Sports shooting
Medal record
Men's shooting
Representing Japan
Asian Championships
| Silver medal – second place | 2012 Patiala | Trap |
| Bronze medal – third place | 2012 Patiala | Trap team |

Shigetaka Oyama (大山 重隆, Ōyama Shigetaka; born 25 August 1981) is a Japanese sports shooter. He competed in the men's trap event at the 2020 Summer Olympics.
