= Italy national shooting team =

National sports team

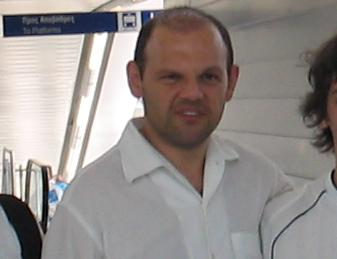
Roberto Di Donna, gold and bronze medal at 1996 Summer Olympics.

The Italy national shooting team represents Italy in International shooting competitions such as Olympic Games or World shooting Championships.

== History ==
The national Italian shooting team participated to all the Summer Olympics editions, from London 1908, 22 times on 24.

== Medal tables ==
Event	Editions	1st edition	Men				Women				Total				Ranking
Event	Editions	1st edition	Gold medal	Silver medal	Bronze medal	Tot.	Gold medal	Silver medal	Bronze medal	Tot.	Gold medal	Silver medal	Bronze medal	Tot.	Ranking
Olympic Games	24	1908	13	11	11	35	3	4	0	7	16	15	11	35	4th
World Championships	50	1897									104	87	91	282	4th

== Olympic Games ==
The Italian national shooting team (including rifle and pistol events and shotgun) has won 42 medals at the Summer Olympic Games and hits consecutively from Melbourne 1956, that is from 16 editions. The following table highlights the 14 medals in shooting rifle and pistol events (5 gold, 3 silver and 3 bronze). In italics the medals of the women (four medals in total: one gold and three silver).

Discipline	1st place, gold medalist(s)	2nd place, silver medalist(s)	3rd place, bronze medalist(s)
Bullseye	5	4	3
Shotgut	11	11	8
	16	15	11

Edition	Gold	Silver	Bronze	Total
(Greece) Athens 1896				DNP
(France) Paris 1900				DNP
(United States) St. Louis 1904	Shooting is not part of the Olympic program			
(United Kingdom) London 1908				0
(Sweden) Stockholm 1912				0
(Belgium) Antwerp 1920				0
(France) Paris 1924				0
(Netherlands) Amsterdam 1928	Shooting is not part of the Olympic program			
(United States) Los Angeles 1932	Renzo Morigi		Domenico Matteucci	2
(Nazi Germany) Berlin 1936				0
(United Kingdom) London 1948				0
(Finland) Helsinki 1952				0
(Australia) Melbourne 1956	Galliano Rossini		Alessandro Ciceri	2
(Italy) Rome 1960		Galliano Rossini		1
(Japan) Tokyo 1964	Ennio Mattarelli			1
Mexico City 1968		Romano Garagnani		1
(West Germany) Munich 1972	Angelo Scalzone		Silvano Basagni	2
(Canada) Montreal 1976			Roberto Ferraris	2
(Canada) Montreal 1976			Ubaldesco Baldi	2
(Soviet Union) Moscow 1980	Luciano Giovannetti			1
(United States) Los Angeles 1984	Luciano Giovannetti	Edith Gufler	Luca Scribani Rossi	3
(South Korea) Seul 1988			Marco Venturini	1
(Spain) Barcelona 1992			Bruno Rossetti	1
(United States) Atlanta 1996	Roberto Di Donna	Albano Pera	Roberto Di Donna	5
(United States) Atlanta 1996	Ennio Falco		Andrea Benelli	5
(Australia) Sydney 2000		Deborah Gelisio	Giovanni Pellielo	2
(Greece) Athens 2004	Andrea Benelli	Giovanni Pellielo		3
(Greece) Athens 2004		Valentina Turisini		3
(China) Beijing 2008	Chiara Cainero	Giovanni Pellielo		3
(China) Beijing 2008		Francesco D'Aniello		3
(United Kingdom) London 2012	Jessica Rossi	Luca Tesconi		5
(United Kingdom) London 2012	Niccolò Campriani	Massimo Fabbrizi		5
(United Kingdom) London 2012		Niccolò Campriani		5
(Brazil) Rio de Janeiro 2016	Gabriele Rossetti	Giovanni Pellielo		7
(Brazil) Rio de Janeiro 2016	Diana Bacosi	Chiara Cainero		7
(Brazil) Rio de Janeiro 2016	Niccolò Campriani	Marco Innocenti		7
(Brazil) Rio de Janeiro 2016	Niccolò Campriani			7
	16	15	11	42

note: Italic = Women

== Multiple medalist ==
=== Olympic Games ===
The list refers to individual and team events and include men and women (in pink color), sorted by number of individual titles.

#	Fencer	Individual			Team			Total		
#	Fencer	Gold medal	Silver medal	Bronze medal	Gold medal	Silver medal	Bronze medal	Gold medal	Silver medal	Bronze medal
1	Niccolò Campriani	3	1	0	0	0	0	3	1	0
2	Luciano Giovannetti	2	0	0	0	0	0	2	0	0
3	Galliano Rossini	1	1	0	0	0	0	1	1	0
3	Chiara Cainero	1	1	0	0	0	0	1	1	0
5	Roberto Di Donna	1	0	1	0	0	0	1	0	1
5	Andrea Benelli	1	0	1	0	0	0	1	0	1
7	Giovanni Pellielo	0	3	1	0	0	0	0	3	1

== See also ==
- Italy at the Olympics
- Shooting Summer Olympics medal table
