= Massimiliano Mola =

Italian sport shooter

Personal information
- National team: Italy
- Born: 1 December 1971 (age 54) Fasano, Italy
- Height: 1.70 m (5 ft 7 in)
- Weight: 84 kg (185 lb)

Sport
- Sport: Shooting
- Event: Trap
- Club: TAV Fasano
- Start activity: 1991
Medal record
Individual
Event	1st	2nd	3rd
World Championships	0	1	0
World Cup Final	0	2	0
World Cup	1	2	1
Total	1	5	1
Team
Event	1st	2nd	3rd
World Championships	1	0	0

Massimiliano Mola (born 1 December 1971) is a former Italian sport shooter who won a medal at individual senior level at the World Championships.

== Achievements ==
Year	Competition	Venue	Rank	Event	Score
2003	World Cup Final	(Italy) Rome	2nd	Trap	141
2004	World Cup	(Australia) Sydney (WC 1)	2nd	Trap	139
2004	World Cup	(Greece) Athens (WC 3)	3rd	Trap	140
2005	World Championships	(Italy) Lonato del Garda	2nd	Trap	142
2005	World Championships	(Italy) Lonato del Garda	1st	Trap team	362
2007	World Cup	(Italy) Lonato del Garda (WC 3)	1st	Trap	147
2007	World Cup Final	(Serbia) Belgrade	2nd	Trap	140
2008	World Cup	(United States) Kerrville (WC 2)	2nd	Trap	143
