= 2001 World Championships =

2001 World Championships may refer to:

- Alpine skiing: Alpine World Ski Championships 2001
- Aquatics: 2001 World Aquatics Championships
- Athletics:
  - 2001 World Championships in Athletics
  - 2001 IAAF World Indoor Championships
  - Cross-country running: 2001 IAAF World Cross Country Championships
  - Road running: 2001 IAAF World Half Marathon Championships
- Badminton: 2001 IBF World Championships
- Bandy: Bandy World Championship 2001
- Biathlon: Biathlon World Championships 2001
- Boxing: 2001 World Amateur Boxing Championships
- Chess: FIDE World Chess Championship 2001
- Curling:
  - 2001 World Men's Curling Championship
  - 2001 World Women's Curling Championship
- Darts: 2001 BDO World Darts Championship
- Darts: 2001 PDC World Darts Championship
- Figure skating: 2001 World Figure Skating Championships
- Ice hockey: 2001 Men's World Ice Hockey Championships
- Ice hockey: 2001 Women's World Ice Hockey Championships
- Nordic skiing: FIS Nordic World Ski Championships 2001
- Speed skating:
  - Allround: 2001 World Allround Speed Skating Championships
  - Sprint: 2001 World Sprint Speed Skating Championships
  - Single distances: 2001 World Single Distance Speed Skating Championships

== See also ==
- 2001 World Cup (disambiguation)
- 2001 Continental Championships (disambiguation)
- 2001 World Junior Championships (disambiguation)
