= 2017 World Shotgun Championships =

The 2017 World Shotgun Championships were held from August 30 to September 11, 2017 in Moscow, Russia. As in all odd-numbered years, separate ISSF World Shooting Championships is carried out in the Trap, Double Trap and Skeet events.

== Competition schedule ==
Date	Men, Junior Men	Women, Junior Women
Friday, 1 September	Trap, day 1	Trap, day 1
Saturday, 2 September	Trap, day 2	Trap, day 2
Sunday, 3 September	Trap, day 3	
Monday, 4 September	Trap Mixed Team	
Tuesday, 5 September	Double Trap	Double Trap
Wednesday, 6 September		
Thursday, 7 September	Skeet, day 1	Skeet, day 1
Friday, 8 September	Skeet, day 2	Skeet, day 2
Saturday, 9 September	Skeet, day 3	
Sunday, 10 September	Skeet Mixed Team	

== Men ==
Event	Gold		Silver		Bronze	
Trap	Daniele Resca (ITA)		Edward Ling (GBR)		Jiří Lipták (CZE)	
Trap Team	Italy; Daniele Resca; Valerio Grazini; Giovanni Pellielo	362	Czech Republic; Jiří Lipták; David Kostelecký; Vladimir Stepan	359	Spain; Alberto Fernández; Antonio Bailón; José Luis Uris	357
Double Trap	Vitaly Fokeev (RUS)		Ankur Mittal (IND)		Hu Binyuan (CHN)	
Double Trap Team	Italy; Daniele Di Spigno; Antonino Barillà; Alessandro Chianese	418	China; Hu Binyuan; Chen Xinyu; Yang Yiyang	416	Russia; Vitaly Fokeev; Artem Nekrasov; Vasily Mosin	415
Skeet	Gabriele Rossetti (ITA)		Vincent Haaga (GER)		Georgios Achilleos (CYP)	
Skeet Team	Italy; Gabriele Rossetti; Tammaro Cassandro; Riccardo Filippelli	364	Russia; Nikolay Teplyy; Alexander Zemlin; Anton Astakhov	363	Czech Republic; Miloš Slavíček; Jan Zámečník; Tomáš Nýdrle	361

== Women ==
Event	Gold		Silver		Bronze	
Trap	Jessica Rossi (ITA)		Catherine Skinner (AUS)		Zuzana Rehák-Štefečeková (SVK)	
Trap Team	United States; Ashley Carroll; Caitlin Weinheimer; Corey Cogdell	203	Finland; Marika Salmi; Satu Mäkelä-Nummela; Mopsi Veromaa	203	Italy; Jessica Rossi; Silvana Stanco; Alessia Iezzi	203
Double Trap^{[a]}	Li Qingnian (CHN)		Kang Gee-eun (KOR)		Rachel Parish (GBR)	
Double Trap Team^{[a]}	Italy; Claudia De Luca; Sofia Maglio; Sofia Littame	259	Great Britain; Rachel Parish; Linda Pearson; Cheryl Gizzi	240	Russia; Lilia Valeeva; Elena Tkach; Liudmila Kohkhlova	234
Skeet	Dania Jo Vizzi (USA)		Albina Shakirova (RUS)		Andri Eleftheriou (CYP)	
Skeet Team	United States; Kimberly Rhode; Dania Jo Vizzi; Caitlin Connor	216 WR	Italy; Diana Bacosi; Katiuscia Spada; Simona Scocchetti	211	Russia; Albina Shakirova; Nadezda Konovalova; Anastasia Krakhmaleva	209

^{a} Held as a Grand Prix event and does not count towards medal standings.

== Mixed events ==
Event	Gold	Silver	Bronze
Trap Mixed Team	Australia 2 Thomas Derek Grice; Penny Smith	Spain 1 Antonio Bailón; Beatriz Martínez	United States 1 Derek Haldeman; Ashley Carroll
Skeet Mixed Team	Russia 1 Nikolay Teplyy; Nadezda Konovalova	United States 2 Hayden Stewart; Dania Jo Vizzi	Italy 2 Tammaro Cassandro; Katiuscia Spada

== Men Junior ==
Event	Gold		Silver		Bronze	
Trap	Clement Bourgue (FRA)		Matteo Marongiu (ITA)		Jack Wallace (AUS)	
Trap Team	Australia; Mitchell Iles-Crevatin; Jack Wallace; Adam Joshua Bylsma	351	Italy; Emanuele Buccolieri; Matteo Marongiu; Teo Petroni	345	United States; Ryne Barfield; Dale Royer; Logan Mountain	343
Double Trap	James Dedman (GBR)		Ahvar Rizvi (IND)		Qi Ying (CHN)	
Double Trap Team	India; Shardul Vihan; Ahvar Rizvi; Shapath Bharadwaj	401	Italy; Jacopo de Foresta; Eraldo Apolloni; Marco Carli	389	China; Qi Ying; Zhang Changshuai; Cao Xudong	387
Skeet	Emil Kjelgaard Petersen (DEN)		Elia Sdruccioli (ITA)		Nicolas Vasiliou (CYP)	
Skeet Team	Italy; Elia Sdruccioli; Valerio Palmucci; Erik Pittini	353	Turkey; Kemal Madencioğlu; Salih Hafız; Onur Atak	348	United States; Nic Moschetti; Elijah Keith Ellis; Eli Nazaret Christman	345

== Women Junior ==
Event	Gold		Silver		Bronze	
Trap	Maria Lucia Palmitessa (ITA)		Iuliia Saveleva (RUS)		Diana Ghilarducci (ITA)	
Trap Team	Italy; Maria Lucia Palmitessa; Diana Ghilarducci; Greta Luppi	200	Russia; Iuliia Saveleva; Polina Kniazeva; Angelina Rudneva	191	United States; Emma Lee Williams; Joyce Elizabeth Hunsaker; Emily Hampson	187
Skeet	Katharina Monika Jacob (USA)		Austen Jewell Smith (USA)		Samantha Simonton (USA)	
Skeet Team	United States; Katharina Monika Jacob; Austen Jewell Smith; Samantha Simonton	211 WRJ	Czech Republic; Hana Adámková; Anna Sindelarova; Zuzana Zaoralova	193	Germany; Eva-Tamara Reichert; Maria Kalix; Valentina Umhöfer	191

== Medal summary ==
=== Seniors ===
Rank	Nation	Gold	Silver	Bronze	Total
1	Italy (ITA)	6	1	2	9
2	United States (USA)	3	1	1	5
3	Russia (RUS)	2	2	2	6
4	Australia (AUS)	1	1	0	2
5	Czech Republic (CZE)	0	1	2	3
6	China (CHN)	0	1	1	2
6	Spain (ESP)	0	1	1	2
8	Finland (FIN)	0	1	0	1
8	Germany (GER)	0	1	0	1
8	Great Britain (GBR)	0	1	0	1
8	India (IND)	0	1	0	1
12	Cyprus (CYP)	0	0	2	2
13	Slovakia (SVK)	0	0	1	1
Totals (13 entries)		12	12	12	36

=== Juniors ===
Rank	Nation	Gold	Silver	Bronze	Total
1	Italy (ITA)	3	4	1	8
2	United States (USA)	2	1	4	7
3	India (IND)	1	1	0	2
4	Australia (AUS)	1	0	1	2
5	Denmark (DEN)	1	0	0	1
5	France (FRA)	1	0	0	1
5	Great Britain (GBR)	1	0	0	1
8	Russia (RUS)	0	2	0	2
9	Czech Republic (CZE)	0	1	0	1
9	Turkey (TUR)	0	1	0	1
11	China (CHN)	0	0	2	2
12	Cyprus (CYP)	0	0	1	1
12	Germany (GER)	0	0	1	1
Totals (13 entries)		10	10	10	30
