= Ahmed Zaher =

Egyptian trap shooter

Ahmed Kamar
Personal information
- Born: 13 December 1976 (age 49) Cairo, Egypt

Sport
- Sport: Sports shooting
Medal record
Representing Egypt
ISSF World Cup
Silver medal – second place	2021 Cairo	Trap Mixed Team
Bronze medal – third place	2021 Cairo	Trap Team Men
Silver medal – second place	2019 Acapulco	Trap Men

Ahmed Tawhed Mahmoud Baheg Zaher (Egyptian Arabic: احمد توحيد محمود بهيج زاهر, born 13 December 1989 in Cairo), known as Ahmed Zaher, is an Egyptian Olympic trap shooter. He competed in the trap event at the 2012 Summer Olympics and placed 22nd in the qualification round.

He competed at the 2020 Summer Olympics in the men's trap event.
