= 2001 Continental Championships =

2001 Continental Championships may refer to:

== African Championships ==
- Basketball: 2001 FIBA Africa Championship

== Asian Championships ==
- Baseball: 2001 Asian Baseball Championship
- Basketball: 2001 ABC Championship
- Football (soccer): 2000–01 Asian Club Championship

== European Championships ==
- Artistic gymnastics: 2001 European Team Gymnastics Championships
- Athletics: 2001 IAAF World Indoor Championships
- Basketball: EuroBasket 2001
- Figure skating: 2001 European Figure Skating Championships
- Football (soccer): 2000–01 UEFA Champions League
- Football (soccer): 2000–01 UEFA Cup
- Football (soccer): 2001 UEFA European Under-16 Championship
- Football (soccer): 2001–02 UEFA Women's Cup
- Volleyball: 2001–02 CEV Champions League
- Volleyball: 2001–02 CEV Women's Champions League

== Oceanian Championships ==
- Basketball: 2001 FIBA Oceania Championship

== Pan American Championships / North American Championships ==
- Basketball: 2001 Tournament of the Americas
- Football (soccer): 2001 Caribbean Cup
- Gymnastics (artistic and rhythmic): 2001 Pan American Gymnastics Championships

== South American Championships ==
- Football (soccer): 2001 Copa Libertadores

== See also ==
- 2001 World Championships (disambiguation)
- 2001 World Junior Championships (disambiguation)
- 2001 World Cup (disambiguation)
- Continental championship (disambiguation)
