= Derek Burnett =

Irish sports shooter (born 1970)

Personal information
- Nationality: Irish
- Born: 27 October 1970 (age 55) Westmeath, Ireland
- Home town: Kenagh, County Longford
- Height: 177 cm (5 ft 10 in)
- Weight: 90 kg (198 lb)

Sport
- Country: Ireland
- Sport: Shooting
- Event: Trap

Derek Burnett (born 27 October 1970) is an Irish sport shooter from County Longford, who specialises in the trap.

At the 2004 Olympic Games he finished in joint ninth place in the trap qualification, missing a place among the top six, who progressed to the final round. He also competed at the 2000, 2008, 2012 and 2020 Olympic Games as well as the 2015 and 2019 European Games.

Olympic results
Event	2000	2004	2008	2012
Trap	18th 111	9th 119	29th 110	27th 116
