= Carlo Angelantoni =

Italian sport shooter

Personal information
- National team: Italy
- Born: 12 February 1971 (age 55) Todi, Italy
- Height: 1.80 m (5 ft 11 in)
- Weight: 85 kg (187 lb)

Sport
- Sport: Shooting
- Event(s): Trap, Universal trench
- Club: Casesta della Marmore
- Start activity: 1985
Medal record
Individual
Event	1st	2nd	3rd
European Championships	0	0	1
World Cup	1	2	0
Total	1	2	1
Team
Event	1st	2nd	3rd
European Championships	1	0	1

Carlo Angelantoni (born 30 July 1959) is a former Italian sport shooter who won medals at senior level at the European Championships.

== Career ==
Angelantoni won three medals in World Cup. He has also obtained nine international medals, at the world championships and at the European championships, in the universal trench, discipline of shooting other than trap (Olympic trenc) and for this reason not under the aegis of the International Shooting Sport Federation (ISSF) but of the Fédération Internationale de Tir aux Armes Sportives de Chasse (FITASC).

== Honours ==
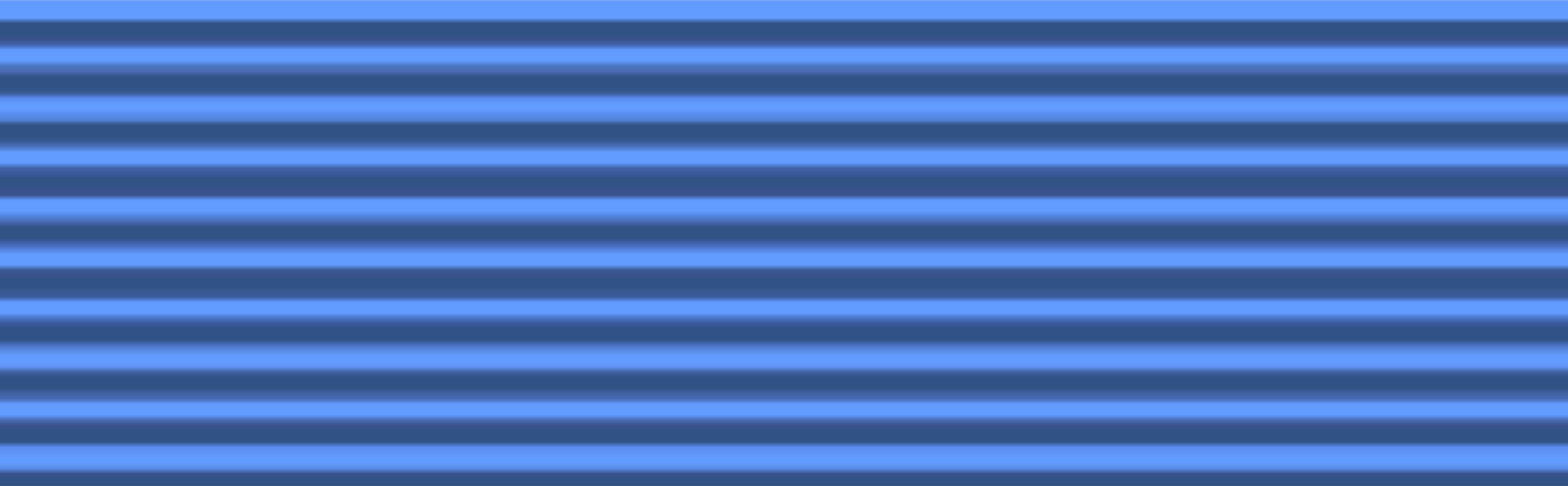

CONI: Golden Collar of Sports Merit: Collare d'Oro al Merito Sportivo

== See also ==
- Trap World Champions
- Trap European Champions
