= Karsten Bindrich =

German sport shooter

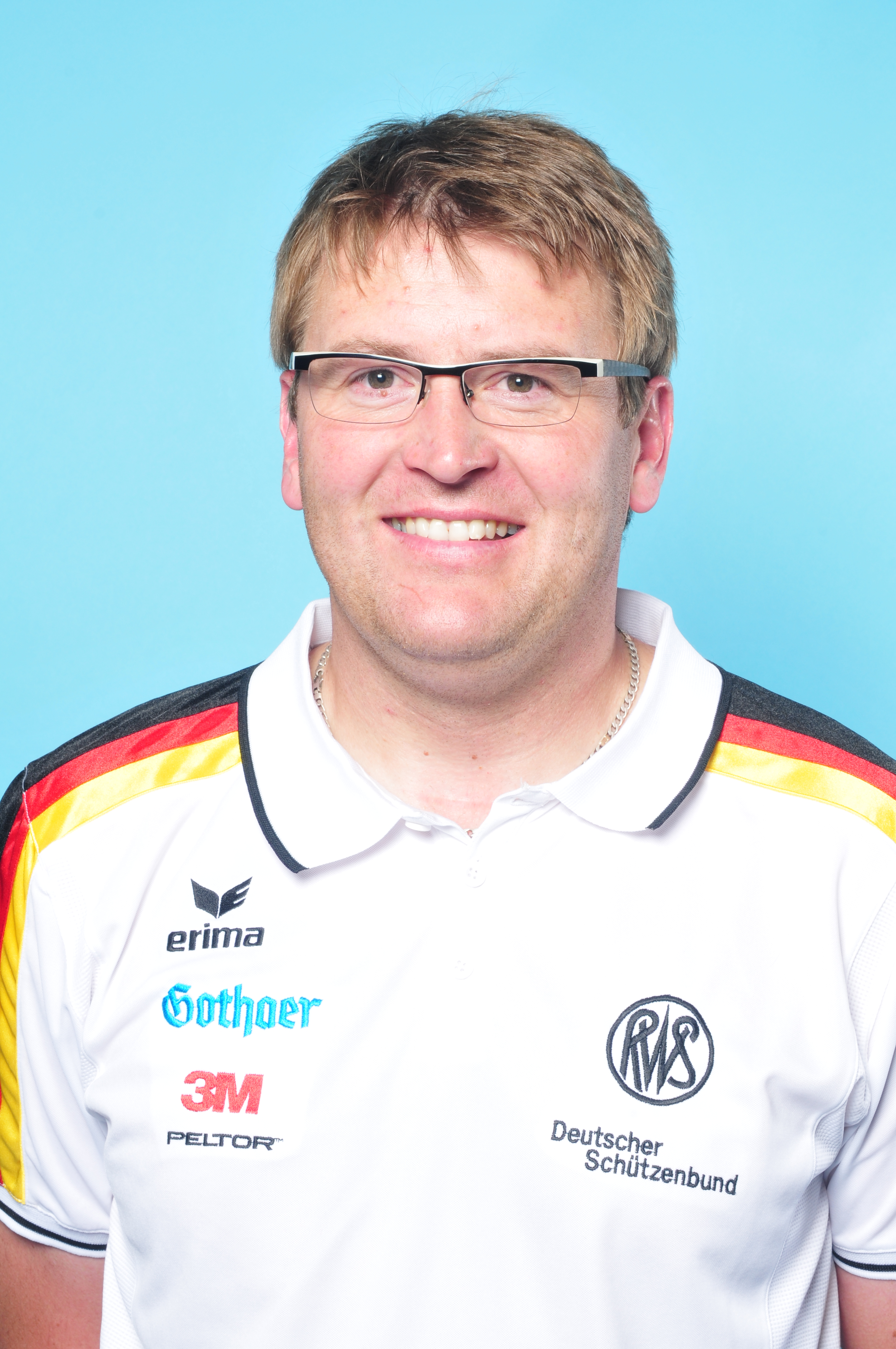
Karsten Bindrich (2012)

Karsten Bindrich (born 15 April 1973 in Lutherstadt Wittenberg) is a German sport shooter who specializes in the trap.

At the 2004 Olympic Games he finished in joint fourteenth place in the trap qualification, missing a place among the top six, who progressed to the final round.

At the 2008 Olympic Games he finished in joint sixth place in the trap qualification. Losing in the subsequent shoot-off against Michael Diamond and Josip Glasnović, Bindrich missed out on the final again.

== Olympic results ==
Event	1996	2000	2004	2008	2012
Trap	9th 121	—	14th 117	7th 119	11th 121
Double trap	15th 133	—	—	—	—

== Records ==
Current world records held in trap
Men	Final	49	Nathan Hales (GBR)	July 16, 2023	Lonato (ITA)
