= Roberto Scalzone =

Italian sport shooter (1962–2019)

Personal information
- National team: Italy
- Born: 28 May 1962 Italy
- Died: 18 July 2019 (aged 57) Castel Volturno, Italy

Sport
- Sport: Shooting
- Event: Trap
Medal record
Individual
| Event | 1st | 2nd | 3rd |
|---|---|---|---|
| World Championships | 0 | 0 | 1 |
| European Championships | 0 | 1 | 0 |
| World Cup Final | 1 | 1 | 3 |
| World Cup | 1 | 0 | 4 |
| Total | 2 | 2 | 8 |
Team
| Event | 1st | 2nd | 3rd |
|---|---|---|---|
| World Championships | 3 | 0 | 0 |

Roberto Scalzone (28 May 1962 - 18 July 2019) was an Italian sport shooter who won a medal at individual senior level at the World Championships.

He was the son of the Italian Olympic shooter Angelo Scalzone.
