= Juan Carlos Pérez (sport shooter) =

Bolivian sport shooter

Personal information
- Born: 6 October 1981 (age 43); Sucre, Bolivia

Sport
- Sport: Sport shooting

Juan Carlos Pérez (born 6 October 1981) is a Bolivian trap shooter. He competed in the trap event at the 2012 Summer Olympics and placed 31st in the qualification round.
