= Erminio Frasca =

Italian sport shooter

Personal information
- Nationality: Italian
- Born: 5 June 1983 (age 43) Priverno, Italy
- Weight: 1.73 m
- Website: 73 kg

Sport
- Sport: Sports shooting
- Club: Fiamme Oro
Medal record
Men's shooting
Representing Italy
European Championships
Silver medal – second place	2026 Athens	Team trap

Erminio Frasca (Priverno, 5 giugno 1983) è un tiratore a volo italiano finalista ai Giochi Olimpici estivi di Pechino 2008
