= Gabriele Rossetti (sport shooter) =

Italian sport shooter (born 1995)

Personal information
- Born: 7 March 1995 (age 31) Florence, Italy
- Height: 1.77 m (5 ft 10 in)
- Weight: 65 kg (143 lb)

Sport
- Country: Italy
- Sport: Shooting
- Event: Skeet
- Club: Fiamme Oro
Medal record
Men's shooting
Representing Italy
Olympic Games
Gold medal – first place	2016 Rio de Janeiro	Skeet
Gold medal – first place	2024 Paris	Skeet mixed team
World Championships
Gold medal – first place	2017 Moscow	Skeet
Gold medal – first place	2017 Moscow	Skeet team
Gold medal – first place	2019 Lonato del Garda	Mixed skeet pairs
Gold medal – first place	2022 Osijek	Skeet team
Silver medal – second place	2015 Lonato del Garda	Skeet team
Silver medal – second place	2018 Changwon	Skeet team
Silver medal – second place	2022 Osijek	Mixed skeet pairs
Bronze medal – third place	2015 Lonato del Garda	Skeet
Bronze medal – third place	2019 Lonato del Garda	Skeet team
Bronze medal – third place	2023 Baku	Skeet team
European Games
Gold medal – first place	2019 Minsk	Mixed team skeet
Gold medal – first place	2023 Kraków-Małopolska	Mixed team skeet
Silver medal – second place	2023 Kraków-Małopolska	Team skeet
Bronze medal – third place	2019 Minsk	Skeet
European Championships
Gold medal – first place	2016 Lonato del Garda	Skeet
Gold medal – first place	2021 Osijek	Skeet
Gold medal – first place	2022 Larnaca	Skeet team
Gold medal – first place	2023 Osijek	Skeet team
Gold medal – first place	2025 Chateauroux	Skeet team
Gold medal – first place	2026 Athens	Skeet team
Silver medal – second place	2017 Baku	Skeet
Silver medal – second place	2017 Baku	Skeet team
Silver medal – second place	2018 Leobersdorf	Skeet team
Silver medal – second place	2018 Leobersdorf	Mixed skeet pairs
Silver medal – second place	2024 Lonato	Skeet team
Bronze medal – third place	2017 Baku	Mixed skeet pairs
Bronze medal – third place	2021 Osijek	Skeet team
Bronze medal – third place	2021 Osijek	Mixed skeet pairs
Mediterranean Games
Bronze medal – third place	2022 Oran	Mixed team skeet

Gabriele Rossetti (born 7 March 1995) is an Italian shooter, the son of the Olympic medalist Bruno Rossetti. He represented his country at the 2016 Summer Olympics where he won the gold medal in skeet. Rossetti also won the individual and team gold medals in skeet at the 2017 World Championships in Moscow.
