= Giovanni Cernogoraz =

Croatian sports shooter (born 1982)

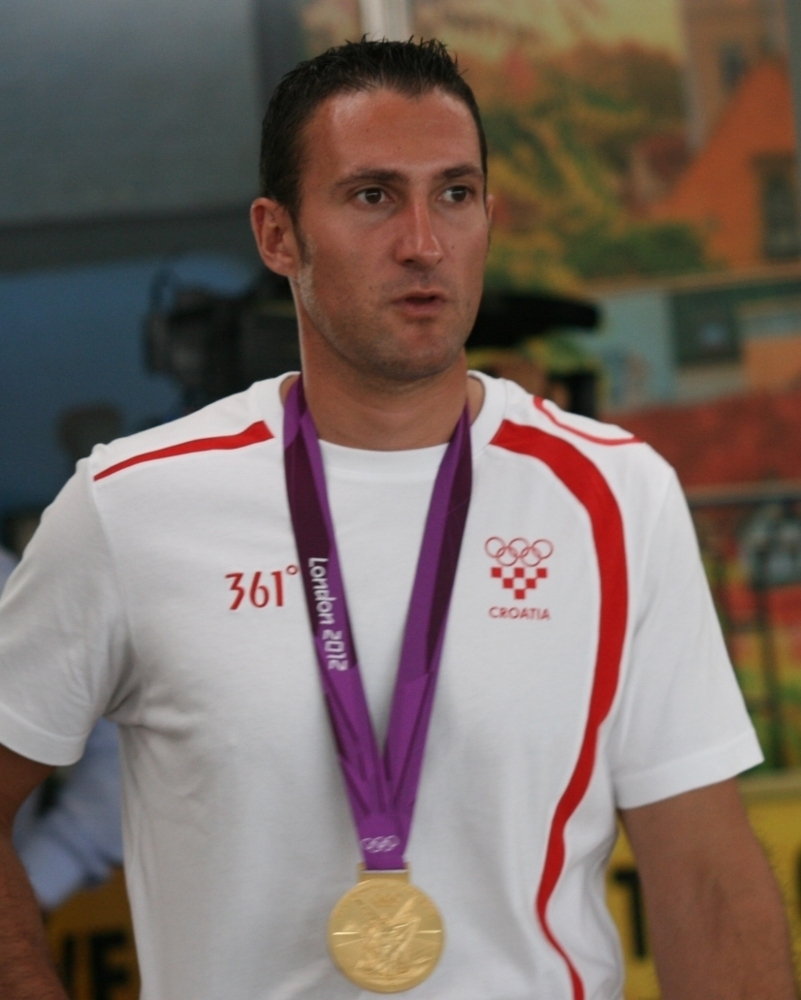
- Cernogoraz in 2012

Personal information
- Nickname: Gianni
- Citizenship: Croatian, Italian
- Born: 27 December 1982 (age 43) Koper, SR Slovenia, Yugoslavia
- Height: 1.84 m (6 ft 0 in)
- Weight: 80 kg (176 lb)

Sport
- Country: Croatia
- Sport: Shooting
- Events: Trap, Double trap
- Club: Gord Velika Gorica
- Coached by: Stjepan Vučković (personal); Željko Vađić (national)

Achievements and titles
- Olympic finals: 2012
Medal record
Men's shooting
Representing Croatia
Olympic Games
| Gold medal – first place | 2012 London | Trap |
World Championships
| Gold medal – first place | 2025 Athens | Team trap |
| Gold medal – first place | 2023 Baku | Trap |
| Bronze medal – third place | 2002 Lahti | Junior trap |
| Bronze medal – third place | 2013 Lima | Team trap |
European Games
| Gold medal – first place | 2023 Kraków-Małopolska | Team trap |
World Cup Final
| Gold medal – first place | 2015 Nicosia | Trap |
European Shotgun Championships
| Gold medal – first place | 2012 Larnaca | Trap |
| Gold medal – first place | 2012 Larnaca | Team trap |
| Gold medal – first place | 2013 Suhl | Team trap |
| Gold medal – first place | 2023 Osijek | Trap |
| Silver medal – second place | 2009 Osijek | Team trap |
| Silver medal – second place | 2025 Chateauroux | Trap Team |
| Bronze medal – third place | 2014 Sarlospuszta | Team trap |
| Bronze medal – third place | 2026 Athens | Team trap |
Mediterranean Games
| Bronze medal – third place | 2013 Mersin | Trap |

Giovanni Cernogoraz (born 27 December 1982) is a Croatian sports shooter. He is an Olympic, World and European champion in trap, as well as two-times European champion in team trap. Competing in shotgun events, he won the Olympic gold medal in men's trap at the London 2012 Summer Olympics. He was elected for Croatian Sportsman of the year by Sportske novosti in 2012.

== Career ==
Cernogoraz started with the sport at an early age, initially becoming interested in it through hunting. He is a member of the Gord sports club based in Velika Gorica and was named Velika Gorica Sportsman of the Year in 2011. After narrowly missing 2004 Olympic Games in Athens and 2008 Olympic Games in Beijing, Cernogoraz managed to qualify for 2012 Olympic Games after winning the ISSF World Cup in Beijing in 2011.

His next notable achievement was winning a gold medal in team trap along with his national team teammates, brothers Anton and Josip Glasnović, and a bronze in individual trap at the 2012 European Shotgun Championships in Larnaca.

At the 2012 Olympics, he managed to qualify for the Olympic final in sixth place with a score of 122. In the final, Cernogoraz scored 24 out of a possible 25, with a total score of 146, equalling the Olympic record and securing a shoot-off for the gold. In the shoot-off, Cernogoraz went on to defeat Italy's Massimo Fabbrizi 6–5 to win gold. It was Croatia's first Olympic gold and only the second shooting sports medal ever won in its entire Olympic history. It was also the first Olympic gold won by an athlete from Istria after Mate Parlov's boxing gold in the 1972 Summer Olympics.

Cernogoraz also competed at the 2016 Summer Olympics and 2024 Summer Olympics.

== Personal life ==
Cernogoraz lives in the town of Novigrad-Cittanova in Croatia, where he works as a waiter at his father's restaurant.

Cernogoraz is an Istrian Italian and holds an Italian passport. He is married and has two children. Cernogoraz is a Roman Catholic.

== Olympic results ==
Olympic results
| Event | 2012 |
|---|---|
| Trap | (gold) Gold; 122+24 (6/6) |
