= 2011 World Shotgun Championships =

International sport shooting competition

The 2011 World Shotgun Championships were held in September 2011 in Belgrade, Serbia.

As in all odd-numbered years, separate ISSF World Shooting Championships were carried out in the trap, double trap, and skeet events.

== Competition schedule ==
Date	Men, Junior Men	Women, Junior Women
Monday, 5 September	Trap, day 1	
Tuesday, 6 September	Trap, day 2	
Wednesday, 7 September		
Thursday, 8 September		Trap
Friday, 9 September		Skeet
Saturday, 10 September	Double trap	
Sunday, 11 September		
Monday, 12 September	Skeet, day 1	
Tuesday, 13 September	Skeet, day 2	

== Men ==
Individual			Teams			Juniors			Junior teams		
Trap
1st place, gold medalist(s)	Massimo Fabbrizi (ITA)	149 (125)	1st place, gold medalist(s)	Italy	369	1st place, gold medalist(s)	Talal Alrashidi (KUW)	122	1st place, gold medalist(s)	Russia	356
2nd place, silver medalist(s)	David Kostelecký (CZE)	146 (122+5)	2nd place, silver medalist(s)	Czech Republic	362	2nd place, silver medalist(s)	Allan Jack Norwood (NZL)	121	2nd place, silver medalist(s)	Italy	356
3rd place, bronze medalist(s)	Stéphane Clamens (FRA)	145 (122+4+6)	3rd place, bronze medalist(s)	Great Britain	359	3rd place, bronze medalist(s)	Maksim Smykov (RUS)	120+5	3rd place, bronze medalist(s)	Czech Republic	349
Double trap
1st place, gold medalist(s)	Li Jun (CHN)	194+4 (146)	1st place, gold medalist(s)	China	432	1st place, gold medalist(s)	William Crawford (USA)	147	1st place, gold medalist(s)	United States	428
2nd place, silver medalist(s)	Andreas Loew (GER)	194+3 (146)	2nd place, silver medalist(s)	Russia	432	2nd place, silver medalist(s)	Artem Nekrasov (RUS)	144+4	2nd place, silver medalist(s)	Russia	420
3rd place, bronze medalist(s)	Walton Eller (USA)	193+4 (145+36)	3rd place, bronze medalist(s)	Kuwait	431	3rd place, bronze medalist(s)	Asher Noria (IND)	144+3	3rd place, bronze medalist(s)	India	419
Skeet
1st place, gold medalist(s)	Juan José Aramburu (ESP)	149+12 (125)	1st place, gold medalist(s)	Russia	367	1st place, gold medalist(s)	Anatoly Fedorov (RUS)	121+20	1st place, gold medalist(s)	Italy	360
2nd place, silver medalist(s)	Tore Brovold (NOR)	149+11 (124)	2nd place, silver medalist(s)	Denmark	366	2nd place, silver medalist(s)	Tammaro Cassandro (ITA)	121+19	2nd place, silver medalist(s)	Czech Republic	356
3rd place, bronze medalist(s)	Abdullah Alrashidi (KUW)	149+9 (124)	3rd place, bronze medalist(s)	United Arab Emirates	366	3rd place, bronze medalist(s)	Gerrit Wuelpern (GER)	121+15	3rd place, bronze medalist(s)	Russia	355

== Women ==
Individual			Teams			Juniors			Junior teams		
Trap
1st place, gold medalist(s)	Liu Yingzi (CHN)	95 (72+3)	1st place, gold medalist(s)	Russia	213	1st place, gold medalist(s)	Janessa Jo Beaman (USA)	70	1st place, gold medalist(s)	United States	201
2nd place, silver medalist(s)	Zuzana Stefecekova (SVK)	92 (72+3)	2nd place, silver medalist(s)	France	213	2nd place, silver medalist(s)	Safiye Sariturk (TUR)	68+2	2nd place, silver medalist(s)	Italy	191
3rd place, bronze medalist(s)	Elena Tkach (RUS)	90 (73)	3rd place, bronze medalist(s)	China	211	3rd place, bronze medalist(s)	Kelly Coogan (AUS)	68+1	3rd place, bronze medalist(s)	Czech Republic	184
Skeet
1st place, gold medalist(s)	Christine Wenzel (GER)	98 (74)	1st place, gold medalist(s)	China	216	1st place, gold medalist(s)	Natalia Vinogradova (RUS)	71	1st place, gold medalist(s)	Russia	197
2nd place, silver medalist(s)	Wei Ning (CHN)	97+8 (73)	2nd place, silver medalist(s)	Italy	211	2nd place, silver medalist(s)	Lucie Anastassiou (FRA)	68+2	2nd place, silver medalist(s)	Great Britain	193
3rd place, bronze medalist(s)	Kimberly Rhode (USA)	97+7 (72+4)	3rd place, bronze medalist(s)	Slovakia	208	3rd place, bronze medalist(s)	Morgan Craft (USA)	68+1	3rd place, bronze medalist(s)	United States	193

== Medal summary ==
=== Seniors ===
Rank	Nation	Gold	Silver	Bronze	Total
1	China	4	1	1	6
2	Russia	2	1	1	4
3	Italy	2	1	0	3
4	Germany	1	1	0	2
5	Spain	1	0	0	1
6	Czech Republic	0	2	0	2
7	France	0	1	1	2
7	Slovakia	0	1	1	2
9	Denmark	0	1	0	1
9	Norway	0	1	0	1
11	Kuwait	0	0	2	2
11	United States	0	0	2	2
13	Great Britain	0	0	1	1
13	United Arab Emirates	0	0	1	1
Totals (14 entries)		10	10	10	30

=== Juniors ===
Rank	Nation	Gold	Silver	Bronze	Total
1	Russia	4	2	2	8
2	United States	4	0	2	6
3	Italy	1	3	0	4
4	Kuwait	1	0	0	1
5	Czech Republic	0	1	2	3
6	France	0	1	0	1
6	Great Britain	0	1	0	1
6	New Zealand	0	1	0	1
6	Turkey	0	1	0	1
10	India	0	0	2	2
11	Australia	0	0	1	1
11	Germany	0	0	1	1
Totals (12 entries)		10	10	10	30
