= Maxim Kosarev =

Russian sport shooter

Maxim Kosarev (born 20 July 1969 in Moscow) is a Russian trap shooter. He competed in the trap event at the 2012 Summer Olympics and placed 9th in the qualification round.
