= Angelo Scalzone =

Italian sports shooter

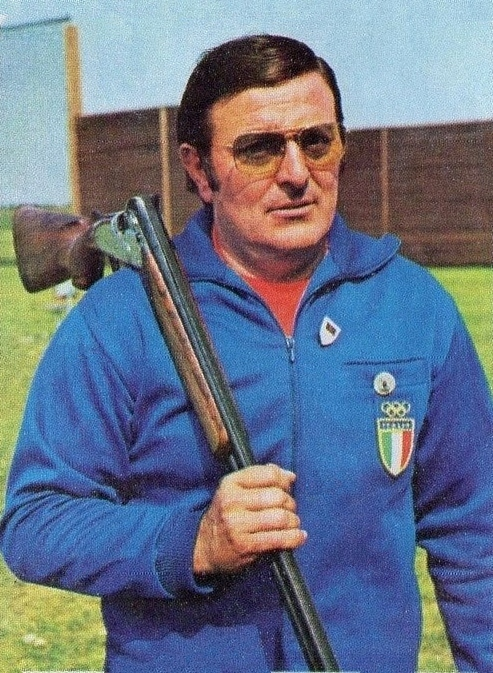

Personal information
- Born: 2 January 1931 Naples, Italy
- Died: 29 April 1987 (aged 56) Paris, France
- Height: 1.77 m (5 ft 10 in)
- Weight: 92 kg (203 lb)
Medal record
Representing Italy
Olympic Games
Gold medal – first place	1972 Munich	Trap shooting

Angelo Scalzone (2 January 1931 – 29 April 1987) was an Italian sport shooter who won a gold medal in trap shooting at the 1972 Summer Olympics. He died of liver cancer in France, aged 56.

Also his son Roberto (1962–2019) was a sport shooter.
