= Daniele Resca =

Italian sport shooter (born 1986)

Personal information
- Nationality: Italy
- Born: 21 August 1986 (age 39) Pieve di Cento

Sport
- Sport: Shooting
Medal record
World Championships
Gold medal – first place	2017 Moscow	Trap
Gold medal – first place	2017 Moscow	Trap team
Silver medal – second place	2023 Baku	Trap team

Daniele Resca (born 21 August 1986 in Pieve di Cento, Italy) is an Italian professional target shooter. He won the gold medal in trap at the 2017 World Championships in Moscow.

== See also ==
- ISSF Olympic trap
