= Rodolfo Viganò =

Italian sports shooter

Personal information
- Nationality: Italian
- Born: 25 January 1971 (age 54); Milan, Italy

Sport
- Sport: Sports shooting

Rodolfo Viganò (born 25 January 1971) is an Italian sports shooter. He competed in the men's trap event at the 2000 Summer Olympics.
