= Casey Wallace =

American sport shooter

Personal information
- Born: August 3, 1990 (age 35) Torrance, California, U.S.
- Height: 1.68 m (5 ft 6 in)
- Weight: 75 kg (165 lb)

Sport
- Country: United States
- Sport: Shooting
- Event: Trap
Medal record
World Championships
Silver medal – second place	2018 Changwon	Trap Men's Team
ISSF World Cup
Gold medal – first place	2018 Tucson	Trap Mixed Team
Gold medal – first place	2022 Lima	Trap Men's Team
Silver medal – second place	2022 Baku	Trap Men's Team

Casey Wallace (born August 3, 1990) is an American sport shooter.

He participated at the 2018 ISSF World Shooting Championships. Wallace has won three ISSF World Cup medals in team events.
