= Jiří Lipták =

Czech trap shooter (born 1982)

Personal information
- Born: 30 March 1982 (age 44) Brno, Czechoslovakia
Medal record
Men's shooting
Representing Czech Republic
Olympic Games
Gold medal – first place	2020 Tokyo	Trap
World Championships
Silver medal – second place	2011 Belgrade	Team trap
Silver medal – second place	2017 Moscow	Team trap
Silver medal – second place	2022 Osijek	Team trap
Bronze medal – third place	2009 Maribor	Team trap
Bronze medal – third place	2010 Munich	Trap
Bronze medal – third place	2014 Granada	Team trap
Bronze medal – third place	2017 Moscow	Trap
Bronze medal – third place	2023 Baku	Team trap
Bronze medal – third place	2026 Doha	Trap team
European Championships
Gold medal – first place	2010 Kazan	Team trap
Gold medal – first place	2011 Belgrade	Team trap
Gold medal – first place	2019 Lonato del Garda	Trap
Gold medal – first place	2022 Larnaca	Trap
Silver medal – second place	2012 Larnaca	Trap
Silver medal – second place	2012 Larnaca	Team trap
Silver medal – second place	2016 Lonato del Garda	Team trap
Silver medal – second place	2021 Osijek	Trap
Silver medal – second place	2023 Osijek	Team trap
Bronze medal – third place	2008 Nicosia	Trap
Bronze medal – third place	2017 Baku	Team trap
Bronze medal – third place	2018 Leobersdorf	Trap

Jiří Lipták (Czech pronunciation: [ˈjɪr̝iː ˈlɪptaːk]; born 30 March 1982 in Brno) is a Czech trap shooter. He competed in the trap event at the 2012 Summer Olympics and placed 18th in the qualification round. Lipták won the gold medal in the Men's Trap event at the 2020 Summer Olympics.
