= James Willett =

Australian sports shooter

Personal information
- Born: 23 December 1995 (age 30) Yarrawonga, Victoria, Australia
- Home town: Mulwala, New South Wales, Australia
- Height: 1.88 m (6 ft 2 in)
- Weight: 88 kg (194 lb)

Sport
- Sport: Sports shooting
Medal record
Men's shooting
Representing Australia
World Championships
Gold medal – first place	2019 Lonato del Garda	Mixed trap pairs
Bronze medal – third place	2022 Osijek	Mixed trap team
Commonwealth Championships
Bronze medal – third place	2017 Brisbane	Trap
Oceanian Championships
Gold medal – first place	2015 Sydney	Double trap
Silver medal – second place	2017 Brisbane	Trap
Silver medal – second place	2017 Brisbane	Double trap

James Willett (born 23 December 1995) is an Australian sports shooter. He competed in the men's double trap event at the 2016 Summer Olympics.

Willett competed in the men's trap event and also the team event with Laetisha Scanlan at the 2020 Summer Olympics. He did not score sufficient points in either event to advance past qualification.
