= Marcello Tittarelli =

Italian sports shooter

Personal information
- National team: Italy
- Born: 14 April 1962 (age 64) Sassoferrato, Italy

Sport
- Sport: Sports shooting
- Event: Trap
Medal record
Individual
Event	1st	2nd	3rd
World Cup	2	3	0
Team
Event	1st	2nd	3rd
World Championships	2	0	0

Marcello Tittarelli (born 14 April 1962) is an Italian former sports shooter who won two gold medals with the national team at senior level at the World Championships. He also competed in the men's trap event at the 1996 Summer Olympics.

== Career ==
He won five international medals at senior level in the World Cup.
