= Marco Venturini =

Italian sports shooter

Personal information
- Born: 12 July 1960 (age 65) Pistoia, Italy
- Height: 1.86 m (6 ft 1 in)
- Weight: 95 kg (209 lb)

Sport
- Sport: Shooting
- Event(s): Trap; Double trap
- Start activity: 1977
Medal record
Men's shooting
Representing Italy
Individual
| Event | 1st | 2nd | 3rd |
|---|---|---|---|
| Olympic Games | 0 | 0 | 1 |
| World Championships | 3 | 1 | 2 |
| European Championships | 3 | 2 | 2 |
| World Cup Final | 2 | 1 | 0 |
| World Cup | 2 | 4 | 4 |
| Total | 10 | 8 | 9 |
Team
| Event | 1st | 2nd | 3rd |
|---|---|---|---|
| World Championships | 4 | 1 | 0 |
Olympic Games
| Bronze medal – third place | 1992 Barcelona | Trap |

Marco Venturini (born 12 July 1960) is an Italian former sport shooter who competed in the 1992 Summer Olympics, in the 1996 Summer Olympics, the 2000 Summer Olympics, and the 2004 Summer Olympics. He was born in Pistoia.

== Career ==
Venturini won 17 medals at international senior level.
