= Anton Glasnović =

Croatian sports shooter (born 1981)

Personal information
- Born: 18 January 1981 (age 45) Zagreb, SR Croatia, SFR Yugoslavia
- Height: 1.83 m (6 ft 0 in)
- Weight: 85 kg (187 lb)

Sport
- Country: Croatia
- Sport: Shooting
- Events: Trap, Double trap
- Club: SD Shooter

Achievements and titles
- Olympic finals: 2012 (Trap)
Medal record
Representing Croatia
Men's shooting
ISSF World Championships
Gold medal – first place	2025 Athens	Team trap
Silver medal – second place	2013 Lima	Trap
Bronze medal – third place	2013 Lima	Team trap
European Games
Gold medal – first place	2023 Kraków-Małopolska	Team trap
European Shotgun Championships
Gold medal – first place	2012 Larnaca	Team trap
Gold medal – first place	2013 Suhl	Team trap
Silver medal – second place	2009 Osijek	Team trap
Silver medal – second place	2018 Leobersdorf	Trap
Silver medal – second place	2025 Chateauroux	Trap Team
Bronze medal – third place	2014 Sarlospuszta	Team trap
Bronze medal – third place	2026 Athens	Team trap
Mediterranean Games
Silver medal – second place	2022 Oran	Trap

Anton Glasnović (born 18 January 1981) is a Croatian sports shooter who competes in shotgun events. His biggest success to date was reaching the trap final at the 2012 Summer Olympics in London.

His also won a gold medal in team trap along with his national team teammates, his brother Josip Glasnović and Giovanni Cernogoraz at the 2012 European Shotgun Championships in Larnaca.

At the 2012 Olympics he managed to qualify for the Olympic final in fifth place with a score of 122. In the final, Glasnović scored 21 out of a possible 25 and finished the competition in 6th place with a total score of 143.

In 2013, Glasnović and his teammates defeated European title at the 2013 European Shotgun Championships in Suhl, Germany. Later that year, in September, Glasnović won individual silver at the 2013 World Shotgun Championships, his first individual championship medal, as well as team bronze with his national team teammates, Giovanni Cernogoraz and Saša Sedmak.

== Olympic results ==
Olympic results
Event	2012
Trap	6th 122+21
Double trap	23rd 114
