= Michael Diamond (sport shooter) =

Australian sport shooter

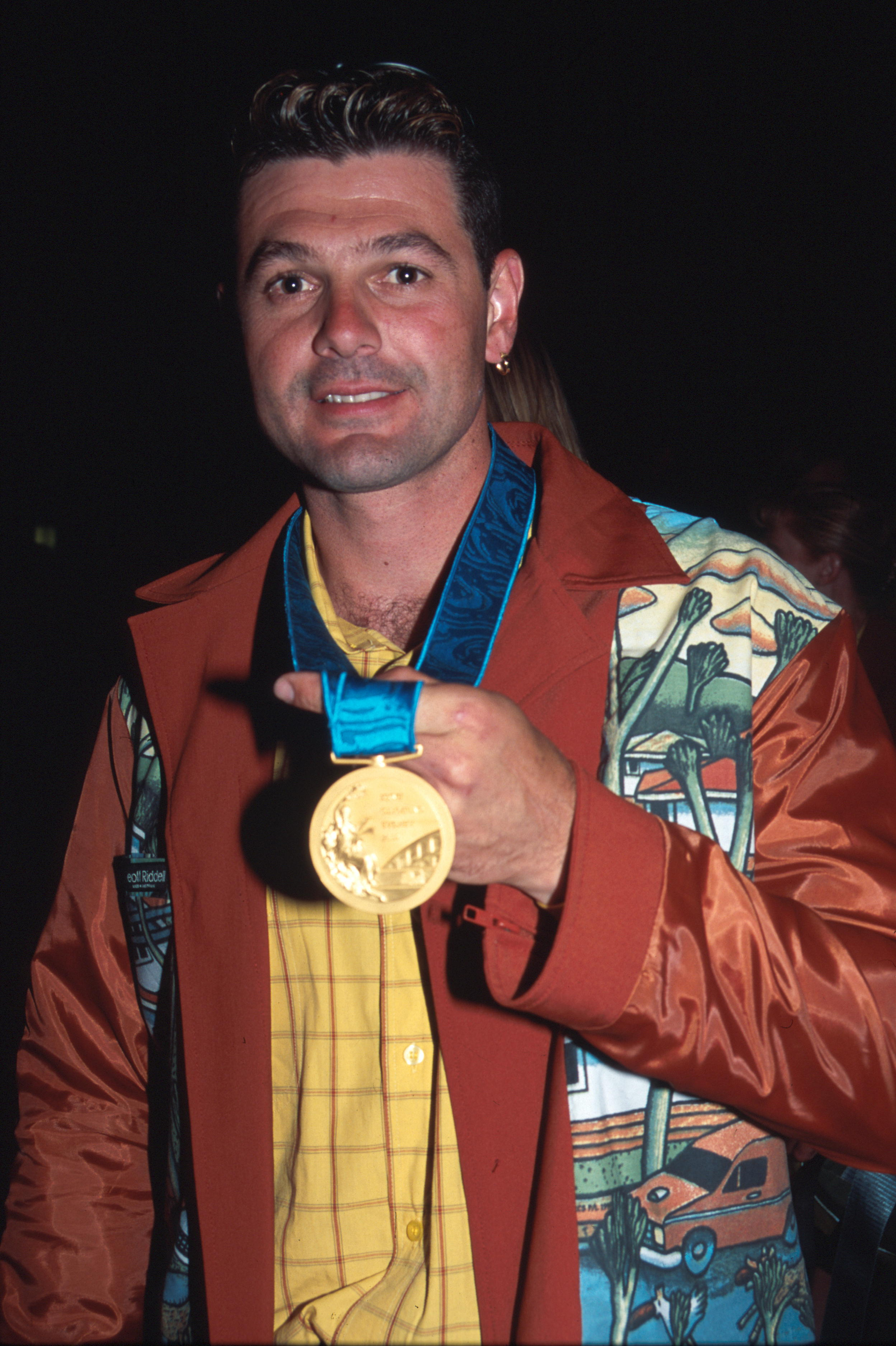

Personal information
- Born: Michael Constantine Diamánti (Diamond); 20 May 1972 (age 54) Sydney, New South Wales
- Height: 174 cm (5 ft 9 in)
- Weight: 75 kg (165 lb)

Sport
- Club: Newcastle-Lake Macquarie
Medal record
Men's shooting
Representing Australia
Olympic Games
Gold medal – first place	1996 Atlanta	Trap
Gold medal – first place	2000 Sydney	Trap
Commonwealth Games
Gold medal – first place	1998 Kuala Lumpur	Trap
Gold medal – first place	2002 Manchester	Trap
Gold medal – first place	2002 Manchester	Trap pairs
Gold medal – first place	2006 Melbourne	Trap pairs
Gold medal – first place	2010 Delhi	Trap pairs
Silver medal – second place	1998 Kuala Lumpur	Trap pairs
Silver medal – second place	2002 Manchester	Double trap pairs
Silver medal – second place	2010 Delhi	Trap
- Updated on 4 October 2015

Michael Constantine Diamond, OAM (born 20 May 1972) is a professional target shooter from Australia.

== Career ==
Diamond was introduced to sport shooting at the age of eight by his father, Con, who was a sporting shooter and managed a gun club.

Mastering the shotgun, Diamond succeeded in winning the Olympic gold medal for trap consecutively in Atlanta in 1996 and Sydney in 2000, becoming the second men's trap shooter to have done so. He held the world record in double trap, and held the final world record in trap between 2007 and 2008. Diamond is of Greek heritage. In 1997, he changed his surname from Diamantopoulos to Diamond.

Diamond won the trap event at the 2007 World Shotgun Championships. He was selected to compete in his sixth Olympic Games in London. At the end of the qualification period, he was leading with an Olympic record of 125/125, but ended up finishing fourth overall, losing to Fehaid Aldeehani of Kuwait in a bronze Medal shoot-out.

Diamond was ruled ineligible for nomination for the 2016 Rio Olympic games by the Australian Olympic Committee as his firearms licence had been suspended on grounds that were later rejected in court.

== Olympic results ==
Event	1992	1996	2000	2004	2008	2012
Trap (mixed)	11th 147+46	Not held				
Trap (men)	Not held	(gold) Gold; 124+25	(gold) Gold; 122+25	8th 119	4th 119+23	4th 125+20
Double trap (men)	Not held	—	9th 135	—	—	—

== Personal life ==
Diamond was born in Goulburn, New South Wales. He is of Greek heritage. He married Cathy and together they had three daughters.

In 2016, Diamond was charged with firearms offences and drink driving following an alleged domestic dispute involving his brother. The charges resulted in the automatic suspension of his firearms licence under Australian law. Without a firearms licence, Diamond was ruled ineligible for nomination for the 2016 Rio Olympic games by the Australian Olympic Committee. A court later quashed these convictions on appeal, questioning the legality of the police search and rejected claims by the prosecution that the firearms were not kept safe. Nonetheless, police did not reinstate his firearms licence and therefore he has been unable to participate or compete in his sport ever since.
