= Josip Glasnović =

Croatian sport shooter (born 1983)

Personal information
- Born: 7 May 1983 (age 43) Zagreb, SR Croatia, Yugoslavia
- Height: 1.78 m (5 ft 10 in)
- Weight: 80 kg (176 lb)

Sport
- Country: Croatia
- Sport: Shooting
- Events: Trap, Double trap
- Club: GAJ Dubrava

Achievements and titles
- Olympic finals: 2008, 2016 (Trap)
Medal record
Representing Croatia
Men's shooting
Olympic Games
Gold medal – first place	2016 Rio de Janeiro	Trap
World Shooting Championships
Gold medal – first place	2025 Athens	Trap
Gold medal – first place	2025 Athens	Team trap
Bronze medal – third place	2005 Lonato	Trap
European Shotgun Championships
Gold medal – first place	2012 Larnaca	Team trap
Gold medal – first place	2013 Suhl	Trap
Gold medal – first place	2013 Suhl	Team trap
Silver medal – second place	2009 Osijek	Team trap
Silver medal – second place	2025 Chateauroux	Trap Team
Bronze medal – third place	2007 Granada	Trap
Bronze medal – third place	2012 Larnaca	Trap
Bronze medal – third place	2014 Sarlospuszta	Team trap
Bronze medal – third place	2026 Athens	Team trap

Josip Glasnović (born 7 May 1983) is a Croatian sports shooter who competes in shotgun events. His biggest success was the gold medal in trap at the 2016 Summer Olympics.

He reached the trap final at the 2008 Summer Olympic Games in Beijing, where he finished 5th.

He also won a gold medal in team trap along with his national team teammates, his brother Anton Glasnović and Giovanni Cernogoraz at the 2012 European Shotgun Championships in Larnaca.

In the 2016 Summer Olympics, he won a gold medal in trap, beating Giovanni Pellielo in the final round.

In 2025, Glasnović won the gold medal in Men's Trap and also secured a team gold with Croatia at the ISSF World Shotgun Championships held in Athens.

== Personal life ==
Glasnović is of Kosovo Croat descent. He is married to Ana Došen Glasnović and they have two children together. He is a devout Roman Catholic.

== Olympic results ==
Olympic results
Event	2008	2016
Trap	5th 119+21	Gold

== Orders ==
- Order of Danica Hrvatska with face of Franjo Bučar – 2016
