= Massimo Fabbrizi =

Italian professional target shooter

Personal information
- Nationality: Italy
- Born: 27 August 1977 (age 49) San Benedetto del Tronto

Sport
- Sport: Shooting
- Club: C.S. Carabinieri
Medal record
Individual
Event	1st	2nd	3rd
Olympic Games	0	1	0
World Championships	4	1	0
World Cup Final	1	1	2
World Cup	4	3	1
European Championships	3	2	1
Mediterranean Games	0	1	0
Total	12	9	4
Summer Olympics
Silver medal – second place	2012 London	Trap
World Championships
Gold medal – first place	2005 Lonato	Trap
Gold medal – first place	2011 Belgrade	Trap
Gold medal – first place	2025 Athends	Trap mixed team
Gold medal – first place	2026 Doha	Trap mixed team
Silver medal – second place	2009 Maribor	Trap
European Championships
Gold medal – first place	2025 Chateauroux	Trap
Gold medal – first place	2025 Chateauroux	Trap Team
Silver medal – second place	2026 Athens	Team trap

Massimo Fabbrizi (born 27 August 1977 in San Benedetto del Tronto, Italy) is an Italian professional target shooter. He competed in the trap event at the 2012 Summer Olympics where he won the silver medal.

Fabbrizi is an athlete of the Centro Sportivo Carabinieri.

== Biography ==
Before the 2012 Olympics, Fabbrizi was the World champion in trap shooting.
