= Slovakia at the European Games =

- IOC code: SVK
- NOC: Slovak Olympic and Sports Committee
- Website: www.olympic.sk (in Slovak)
- Medals: Gold 3 Silver 7 Bronze 9 Total 19

European Games appearances (overview)
- 2015; 2019; 2023; 2027

Slovakia first participated at the European Games at the inaugural 2015 Games in Baku, Azerbaijan.

== Medal tables ==
=== Medals by Games ===
Games	Athletes	Gold	Silver	Bronze	Total	Rank
(Azerbaijan) 2015 Baku	179	2	2	3	7	23
(Belarus) 2019 Minsk	74	0	1	3	4	37
(Poland) 2023 Kraków	145	1	4	3	8	33
(Turkey) 2027 Istanbul	Future event					
Total		3	7	9	19	35

=== Medals by sport ===
Sport	Gold	Silver	Bronze	Total
Shooting	1	5	2	8
Athletics	1	1	2	4
Archery	1	0	0	1
Canoe slalom	0	1	0	1
Boxing	0	0	2	2
Canoe sprint	0	0	2	2
Wrestling	0	0	1	1
Totals (7 entries)	3	7	9	19

== List of medalists ==
Medal	Name	Games	Sport	Event
Gold	Zuzana Štefečeková; Erik Varga	(Azerbaijan) 2015 Baku	Shooting	Mixed trap
Gold	Mixed team: Katarína Belová Tomáš Benko Katarína Berešová Alexandra Bezeková Andrej Bician Jakub Bottlík Matúš Bubeník Tomáš Celko Denis Danáč Paula Habovštiaková Andrea Holleyová Martina Hrašnová Anna Hrvolová Alexander Jablokov Zuzana Karaffová Martin Koch Lenka Kršáková Martin Kučera Veronika Lašová Marcel Lomnický Ľubomíra Maníková Jakub Matúš Lucia Mokrašová Matúš Olej Dušan Páleník Jozef Pelikán Michaela Pešková Lukáš Prevalinec Iveta Putálová Jozef Repčík Silvia Šalgovičová Marek Šefránek Lucia Slaničková Patrícia Slosárová Alexandra Šťuková Ivona Tomanová Roman Turčáni Jozef Urban Dana Velďáková Jana Velďáková Tomáš Veszelka Juraj Vitko Ján Volko Monika Weigertová Adam Zavacký Pavol Ženčár Patrik Ženúch Ján Zmoray	(Azerbaijan) 2015 Baku	Athletics	Mixed team
Silver	Erik Varga	(Azerbaijan) 2015 Baku	Shooting	Men's trap
Silver	Pavol Kopp	(Azerbaijan) 2015 Baku	Shooting	Men's 50 metre pistol
Bronze	Juraj Tužinský	(Azerbaijan) 2015 Baku	Shooting	Men's 10 metre air pistol
Bronze	Viliam Tankó	(Azerbaijan) 2015 Baku	Boxing	Men's 52 kg
Bronze	István Lévai	(Azerbaijan) 2015 Baku	Wrestling	Men's Greco-Roman 66kg
Silver	Ján Volko	(Belarus) 2019 Minsk	Athletics	Men's 100 m
Bronze	Mariana Petrušová	(Belarus) 2019 Minsk	Canoe sprint	Women's K1-5000 m
Bronze	Csaba Zalka; Samuel Baláž; Erik Vlček; Adam Botek	(Belarus) 2019 Minsk	Canoe sprint	Men's K4-500 m
Bronze	Andrej Csemez	(Belarus) 2019 Minsk	Boxing	Men's 75 kg
Gold	Jozef Bošanský	(Poland) 2023 Kraków	Archery	Men's individual compound
Silver	Kamila Novotná	(Poland) 2023 Kraków	Shooting	Women's 10 metre air rifle
Silver	Danka Barteková; Vanesa Hocková; Monika Štibravá	(Poland) 2023 Kraków	Shooting	Women's team skeet
Silver	Matej Beňuš; Marko Mirgorodský; Alexander Slafkovský	(Poland) 2023 Kraków	Canoe slalom	Men's Canoe team
Silver	Adrián Drobný; Marián Kovačócy; Erik Varga	(Poland) 2023 Kraków	Shooting	Men's team trap
Bronze	Gabriela Gajanová	(Poland) 2023 Kraków	Athletics	Women's 800 m
Bronze	Ján Volko	(Poland) 2023 Kraków	Athletics	Men's 200 m
Bronze	Jana Špotáková	(Poland) 2023 Kraków	Shooting	Women's trap

== Flag bearers ==
#	Games	Flag bearer	Sport
3	2023 Kraków	Miroslav Duchoň; Barbora Balážová	Archery; Table tennis
2	2019 Minsk	Juraj Tužinský	Shooting
1	2015 Baku	Richard Varga	Triathlon

== See also ==
- Slovakia at the Olympics
- Slovakia at the Paralympics
- Slovakia at the Youth Olympics
- Slovakia at the European Youth Olympic Festival
- Slovakia at the Universiade
- Slovakia at the World Games
