= Slovakia at the 2015 European Games =

- IOC code: SVK
- NOC: Slovak Olympic and Sports Committee
- Website: www.olympic.sk

in Baku, Azerbaijan 12 – 28 June 2015
- Competitors: 179
- Flag bearers: Richard Varga (opening); Radoslav Prešinský (closing)
- Medals Ranked 23rd: Gold 2 Silver 2 Bronze 3 Total 7

European Games appearances (overview)
- 2015; 2019; 2023; 2027

Slovakia competed at the 2015 European Games, in Baku, Azerbaijan from 12 to 28 June 2015.

Slovakia won 1 gold, 3 silver and 3 bronze medals in Baku. Originally, Slovakia won 2 gold medals, but after Azerbaijan's Dzmitry Marshin was suspended for four years after he failed a drug test, Slovakia lost athletics gold medal because this subsequent doping disqualification led to changes in final standings. Austria received an additional point and overhauled Slovakia.

== Medalists ==
Medal	Name	Sport	Event	Date
Gold	Erik Varga; Zuzana Štefečeková	Shooting	Mixed Trap	18 June
Gold	Mixed team: Katarína Belová Tomáš Benko Katarína Berešová Alexandra Bezeková Andrej Bician Jakub Bottlík Matúš Bubeník Tomáš Celko Denis Danáč Paula Habovštiaková Andrea Holleyová Martina Hrašnová Anna Hrvolová Alexander Jablokov Zuzana Karaffová Martin Koch Lenka Kršáková Martin Kučera Veronika Lašová Marcel Lomnický Ľubomíra Maníková Jakub Matúš Lucia Mokrašová Matúš Olej Dušan Páleník Jozef Pelikán Michaela Pešková Lukáš Prevalinec Iveta Putálová Jozef Repčík Silvia Šalgovičová Marek Šefránek Lucia Slaničková Patrícia Slosárová Alexandra Šťuková Ivona Tomanová Roman Turčáni Jozef Urban Dana Velďáková Jana Velďáková Tomáš Veszelka Juraj Vitko Ján Volko Monika Weigertová Adam Zavacký Pavol Ženčár Patrik Ženúch Ján Zmoray	Athletics	Mixed team	22 June
Silver	Erik Varga	Shooting	Men's Trap	17 June
Silver	Pavol Kopp	Shooting	Men's 50 metre pistol	20 June
Bronze	Viliam Tankó	Boxing	Men's 52 kg	25 June
Bronze	Juraj Tužinský	Shooting	Men's 10 metre air pistol	17 June
Bronze	István Lévai	wrestling	Men's Greco-Roman 66kg	14 June

Medals by sport
Sport	1st place, gold medalist(s)	2nd place, silver medalist(s)	3rd place, bronze medalist(s)	Total
Shooting	1	2	1	4
Athletics	1	0	0	1
Boxing	0	0	1	1
wrestling	0	0	1	1
Total	2	2	3	7

== Archery ==
Men

Athlete	Event	Ranking round		Round of 64	Round of 32	Round of 16	Quarterfinals	Semifinals	Final / BM	
Athlete	Event	Score	Seed	Opposition Score	Opposition Score	Opposition Score	Opposition Score	Opposition Score	Opposition Score	Rank
Boris Baláž	Individual	623	55 Q	Pkhakadze (GEO); L 0–6	Did not advance					33

Women

Athlete	Event	Ranking round		Round of 64	Round of 32	Round of 16	Quarterfinals	Semifinals	Final / BM	
Athlete	Event	Score	Seed	Opposition Score	Opposition Score	Opposition Score	Opposition Score	Opposition Score	Opposition Score	Rank
Alexandra Longová	Individual	642	12 Q	Oliver (GBR); W 6–0	Pavlova (UKR); L 2–6	Did not advance				17

Mixed

Athlete	Event	Ranking round		Round of 64	Round of 32	Round of 16	Quarterfinals	Semifinals	Final / BM	
Athlete	Event	Score	Seed	Opposition Score	Opposition Score	Opposition Score	Opposition Score	Opposition Score	Opposition Score	Rank
Boris Baláž; Alexandra Longová	Mixed Team	1265	22	Did not advance						22

== Athletics ==
- Men's (Tomáš Benko, Andrej Bician, Jakub Bottlík, Matúš Bubeník, Tomáš Čelko, Denis Danáč, Slaven Dizdarević, Martin Koch, Martin Kučera, Marcel Lomnický, Jakub Matúš, Matúš Olej, Dušan Páleník, Jozef Pelikán, Lukáš Privalinec, Jozef Repčík, Marek Šefránek, Roman Turčáni, Jozef Urban, Tomáš Veszelka, Juraj Vitko, Ján Volko, Adam Závacký, Ján Zmoray, Pavol Ženčár, Patrik Žeňúch

Reserve: (Peter Ďurec, Alexander Jablokov, Leonard Lendvorský, Róbert Lӧbb, Lukáš Beer, Tomáš Krajňak, Martin Benák, Libor Charfreitag)

- Women's (Katarína Beľová, Katarína Berešová, Alexandra Bezeková, Paula Habovštiaková, Andrea Holleyová, Martina Hrašnová, Anna Mária Hrvolová, Zuzana Karaffová, Lucia Klocová, Lenka Kršáková, Veronika Ľašová, Ľubomíra Maníková, Lucia Mokrášová, Michaela Pešková, Katarína Pokorná, Iveta Putalová, Lucia Slaničková, Patrícia Slošárová, Sylvia Šalgovičová, Alexandra Štuková, Ivona Tomanová, Dana Velďáková, Jana Velďáková, Monika Weigertová)

Reserve: (Júlia Kočárová, Nikola Lomnická, Klaudia Kálnayová, Ivana Krasňanová, Miroslava Vargová)

Gender	Participant	Event	Round	Mark	Place
Men's	Tomáš Benko	100 metres	Heat 2	10.60 GR	1st place
Men's	Ján Volko	200 metres	Heat 2	21.08 GR	1st place
Men's	Lukas Privalinec	400 metres	Heat 2	48.65	6th place
Men's	Jozef Repčík	800 metres		1:51.51	2nd place
Men's	Jozef Pelikán	1500 metres		3:51.07	2nd place
Men's	Jozef Pelikán	3000 metres		8:24.29	5th place
Men's	Juraj Vitko	5000 metres		14:56.08	5th place
Men's	Alexander Jablokov	3000 metres steeplechase		9:26.23	7th place
Men's	Jakub Bottlík	110 metres hurdles	Heat 2	16.41	8th place
Men's	Martin Kučera	400 metres hurdles	Heat 2	50.70 GR	1st place
Men's	Denis Danac; Roman Turcani; Ján Volko; Tomáš Benkoh	4 × 100 metre relay	Heat 2	40.80	3rd place
Men's	Lukáš Privalinec; Jozef Repčík; Denis Danac; Martin Kučera	4 × 400 metre relay	Heat 2	3:08.80 GR	1st place
Men's	Matúš Bubeník	High jump		2.26 GR	1st place
Men's	Ján Zmoray	Pole vault		5.15 GR	1st place
Men's	Tomáš Veszelka	Long jump		7.01	6th place
Men's	Martin Koch	Triple jump		15.38	6th place
Men's	Matúš Olej	Shot put		17.61	5th place
Men's	Matúš Olej	Discus throw		47.54	7th place
Men's	Marcel Lomnický	Hammer throw		75.41 GR	1st place
Men's	Patrik Žeňúch	Javelin throw		74.89 GR	1st place

Gender	Participant	Event	Round	Mark	Place
Women's	Lenka Kršáková	100 metres	Heat 2	11.76	3rd place
Women's	Alexandra Bezeková	200 metres	Heat 2	23.72	2nd place
Women's	Iveta Putalová	400 metres	Heat 2	53.07 GR	1st place
Women's	Paula Habovštiaková	800 metres		2:07.67	5th place
Women's	Paula Habovštiaková	1500 metres		4:30.17	5th place
Women's	Ľubomíra Maníková	3000 metres		9:57.89	5th place
Women's	Katarína Berešová	5000 metres		16:52.06	4th place
Women's	Katarína Beľová	3000 metres steeplechase		11:11.34	6th place
Women's	Lucia Mokrášová	110 metres hurdles	Heat 2	13.92	2nd place
Women's	Andrea Holleyová	400 metres hurdles	Heat 2	59.81	3rd place
Women's	Lenka Kršáková; Iveta Putalová; Jana Velďáková; Alexandra Bezeková	4 × 100 metre relay	Heat 2	44.92 GR	1st place
Women's	Sylvia Šalgovičová; Alexandra Štuková; Alexandra Bezeková; Iveta Putalová	4 × 400 metre relay	Heat 2	3:35.03 GR	1st place
Women's	Zuzana Karaffová	High jump		1.74	6th place
Women's	Anna Mária Hrvolová	Pole vault		3.40	5th place
Women's	Jana Velďáková	Long jump		6.68 GR	1st place
Women's	Dana Velďáková	Triple jump		13.95	2nd place
Women's	Patrícia Slošárov	Shot put		14.18	4th place
Women's	Ivona Tomanová	Discus throw		42.02	7th place
Women's	Martina Hrašnová	Hammer throw		69.31 GR	1st place
Women's	Veronika Ľašová	Javelin throw		40.35	7th place

== Badminton ==
Men

Athlete	Event	Group stage				Round of 16	Quarterfinal	Semifinal	Final / BM	
Athlete	Event	Opposition Score	Opposition Score	Opposition Score	Rank	Opposition Score	Opposition Score	Opposition Score	Opposition Score	Rank
Jarolím Vicen	Singles	Heino (FIN); L 23–25, 15–21	Malkov (RUS); L 13–21, 16–21	Gunnarsson (ISL); L 17–21, 12–21	4	Did not advance				GS

Women

Athlete	Event	Group stage				Round of 16	Quarterfinal	Semifinal	Final / BM	
Athlete	Event	Opposition Score	Opposition Score	Opposition Score	Rank	Opposition Score	Opposition Score	Opposition Score	Opposition Score	Rank
Jana Čižnárová	Singles	Stanković (SLO); W 10–21, 23–21, 21–16	Cicognini (ITA); L 16–21, 17–21	Gavnholt (CZE); L 13–21, 11–21	3	Did not advance				GS

== 3x3 Basketball ==
=== Women's tournament ===
Team

- Alexandra Pribulová
- Alexandra Riecka
- Zuzana Mračnová
- Dominika Baburová

Group Play

Pos	Team	Pld	W	D	L	PF	PA	PD	Pts	Qualification
1	Spain	3	3	0	0	53	27	+26	6	Qualification to eighth finals
2	Slovenia	3	2	0	1	39	37	+2	4	Qualification to eighth finals
3	Ireland	3	1	0	2	41	47	−6	2	Qualification to eighth finals
4	Slovakia	3	0	0	3	27	49	−22	0	Qualification to eighth finals

First match(es) will be played: 23 June 2015. Source: baku2015.com

23 Jun 2015
13:20

Game 1

Slovakia 6, Spain 14

Basketball Arena, Baku

23 Jun 2015
16:30

Game 2

Ireland 10, Slovenia 14

Basketball Arena, Baku

23 Jun 2015
18:10

Game 3

Slovenia 15, Slovakia 9

Basketball Arena, Baku

24 Jun 2015
12:30

Game 4

Spain 18, Slovenia 10

Basketball Arena, Baku

24 Jun 2015
14:10

Game 5

Ireland 11, Spain 21

Basketball Arena, Baku

24 Jun 2015
16:30

Game 6

Slovakia 12, Ireland 20

Basketball Arena, Baku

Eighth Finals

25 Jun 2015
14:00

Game 1

Ukraine 16, Slovakia 8

Basketball Arena, Baku

== Boxing ==
Men

Athlete	Event	Round of 32	Round of 16	Quarterfinals	Semifinals	Final	
Athlete	Event	Opposition Result	Opposition Result	Opposition Result	Opposition Result	Opposition Result	Rank
Viliam Tankó	52 kg	BYE	Ayigah (BEL); W 3—0	Abgaryan (ARM); W 2—1	Picardi (ITA); L 0—3	Did not advance	3rd place, bronze medalist(s)
Michal Zátorský	60 kg	BYE	Yilmaz (TUR); L 1—2	Did not advance			R16
Matúš Strnisko	81 kg	Camacho Fernandez (ESP); W 3—0	Silyagin (RUS); L 0—3	Did not advance			R16
Erik Tlkanec	91 kg	Hamori (HUN); 0—3	Did not advance				R32

== Canoe sprint ==
Men

Athlete	Event	Heats		Semifinals		Finals	
Athlete	Event	Time	Rank	Time	Rank	Time	Rank
Ľubomír Hagara	C1 200 m	42.034	6 QS	40.695	8 FB	42.507	15
Matej Rusnák	C1 1000 m	4:04.777	4 QS	3:47.954	4	Did not advance	
Miroslav Zaťko	K1 200 m	36.282	6 QS	35.808	7 FB	37.700	17
Peter Gelle	K1 1000 m	3:40.139	5 QS	3:25.951	4 FB	3:35.203	10
Marek Krajčovič	K1 5000 m	—N/a				22:30.158	16
Martin Jankovec; Ľubomír Beňo	K2 200 m	3:14:468	3 QS	33.144	8	Did not advance	
Erik Vlček; Juraj Tarr	K2 1000 m	33.448	8 FA	BYE		3:13:865	4
Marek Krajčovič; Matej Michálek; Viktor Demin; Gabor Jakubík	K4 1000 m	2:54.252	4 QS	2:50.523	1 FA	3:10.773	7

Women

Athlete	Event	Heats		Semifinals		Finals	
Athlete	Event	Time	Rank	Time	Rank	Time	Rank
Ivana Kmeťová; Martina Kohlová	K2 200 m	38.085	5 QS	36.847 GB	1 FA	41.853	8
Ivana Kmeťová; Martina Kohlová	K2 500 m	1:44.421	6 QS	1:39.875	2 FA	1:55.995	7
Lucia Mištinová	K1 5000 m	—N/a	—N/a	—N/a	—N/a	24:22.429	14

== Cycling ==
Spain has qualified for the following events based on the UCI Nations Rankings

=== Road ===
Athlete	Event	Time	Rank
Erik Baška	Men's road race	DNF	
Michael Kolář	Men's road race	5:42:25 (+15:00)	50
Ľuboš Malovec	Men's road race	DNF	
Tereza Medveďová	Women's road race	3:34:09 (+13:33)	44

=== Mountain biking ===
Athlete	Event	Time	Rank
František Lámi	Men's cross-country	LAP	26
Michal Lámi	Men's cross-country	LAP	28

=== BMX ===
Men

Athlete	Event	Qualifying Time Trial		Time Trial Super Final		Motos		Semifinal		Final	
Athlete	Event	Result	Rank	Result	Rank	Points	Rank	Result	Rank	Result	Rank
Michal Tomčo	Men's BMX	36.723	26	Did not advance		18	6	Did not advance			

== Fencing ==
Men

Athlete	Event	Pool Round					Table of 32	Table of 16	Quarterfinal	Semifinal	Final / BM	
Athlete	Event	Opposition Score	Opposition Score	Opposition Score	Opposition Score	Opposition Score	Opposition Score	Opposition Score	Opposition Score	Opposition Score	Opposition Score	Rank
David Vegh	Individual foil	(Italy) Nista (ITA); L 1–5	(France) Mourrain (FRA); L 2–5	(Denmark) Tsoronis (DEN); L 3–5	(United Kingdom) Pelermann (GER); L 3–5	(Russia) Khovanskiy (RUS); L 1–5	Did not advance					

Women

Athlete	Event	Pool Round						Table of 32	Table of 16	Quarterfinal	Semifinal	Final / BM	
Athlete	Event	Opposition Score	Opposition Score	Opposition Score	Opposition Score	Opposition Score	Opposition Score	Opposition Score	Opposition Score	Opposition Score	Opposition Score	Opposition Score	Rank
Michala Cellerová	Individual foil	(Hungary) Golya (HUN); L 2–5	(Poland) Chrzanowska (POL); L 3–5	(Ukraine) Leleyko (UKR); W 5–1	(Russia) Yakovleva (RUS); L 2–5	(Austria) Wohlgemuth (AUT); L 0–5	—N/a	Did not advance					
Dagmar Cipárová	Individual épée	(Hungary) Bukocki (HUN); L 2–5	(Estonia) Beljajeva (EST); L 2–5	(Azerbaijan) Khudaverdiyeva (AZE); W 5–3	(Poland) Nelip (POL); L 4–5	(Sweden) Samuelsson (SWE); L 2–5	(Romania) Branza (ROM); W 5–3	Did not advance					

== Gymnastics ==
=== Artistic ===
Men
Individual

Athlete	Event	Final							
Athlete	Event	Apparatus						Total	Rank
Athlete	Event	F	PH	R	V	PB	HB	Total	Rank
Slavomír Michňák	All-around	11.500	14.666	12.066	13.433	13.066	13.766	78.497	48

Women
Individual

Athlete	Event	Qualification						Final					
Athlete	Event	Apparatus				Total	Rank	Apparatus				Total	Rank
Athlete	Event	V	UB	BB	F	Total	Rank	V	UB	BB	F	Total	Rank
Barbora Mokošová	All-around	13.933	11.166	12.333	12.600	50.032	38 Q	13.833	12.166	10.633	12.200	48.832	18

== Judo ==
Athlete	Event	Round of 64	Round of 32	Round of 16	Quarterfinals	Semifinals	Repechage	Final / BM	
Athlete	Event	Opposition Result	Opposition Result	Opposition Result	Opposition Result	Opposition Result	Opposition Result	Opposition Result	Rank
Matúš Milichovský	Men's −81 kg	Bye	(Georgia (country)) Margiani (GEO); L 000–101	Did not advance					
Milan Randl	Men's −90 kg	(Lithuania) Bauza (LIT); L 000–100	Did not advance						
Matej Hajas	Men's −100 kg	—N/a	(Poland) Wojcik (POL); L 000–100	Did not advance					

== Karate ==
Women

Athlete	Event	Group phase				Semifinal	Final / BM	
Athlete	Event	Opposition Score	Opposition Score	Opposition Score	Rank	Opposition Score	Opposition Score	Rank
Ingrida Suchánková	Women's −61 kg	Abiyeva (AZE); D 2–2	Çoban (TUR); L 0–2	Lenard (CRO); D 0–0	3	Did not advance		5–6

== Shooting ==
Men

Athlete	Event	Qualification		Semifinal		Final	
Athlete	Event	Points	Rank	Points	Rank	Points	Rank
Juraj Tužinský	10 m air pistol	582	2	—N/a		180.1	3rd place, bronze medalist(s)
Pavol Kopp	10 m air pistol	578	10	—N/a		Did not advance	10
Pavol Kopp	50 metre pistol	557	7	—N/a		187.5	2nd place, silver medalist(s)
Erik Varga	Trap	123 GR	2	15	1	14	2nd place, silver medalist(s)
Marián Kovačócy	Trap	118	19	Did not advance			19
Hubert Andrzej Olejník	Double trap	140	6	27	6	Did not advance	6
Štefan Zemko	Skeet	117	22	Did not advance			22

Women

Athlete	Event	Qualification		Semifinal		Final	
Athlete	Event	Points	Rank	Points	Rank	Points	Rank
Jana Hyblerová	10 m air rifle	410.1	31	—N/a		Did not advance	
Jana Hyblerová	50 m rifle 3 positions	575	23	—N/a		Did not advance	
Daniela Pešková	10 m air rifle	413.0	16	—N/a		Did not advance	
Daniela Pešková	50 m rifle 3 positions	577	15	—N/a		Did not advance	
Zuzana Štefečeková	Trap	70	8	Did not advance			
Danka Barteková	Skeet	72	4	14	3	15	4
Andrea Stráňovská	Skeet	64	19	Did not advance			19

Mixed

Athlete	Event	Qualification		Semifinal		Final	
Athlete	Event	Points	Rank	Points	Rank	Points	Rank
Erik Varga; Zuzana Štefečeková	Trap	94	1	28	1	27	1st place, gold medalist(s)
Štefan Zemko; Danka Barteková	Skeet	91	4	25	2	25	4

== Synchronised swimming ==
Slovakia has qualified for the following events

Athlete	Event	Qualification Free Routine		Final	
Athlete	Event	Points	Rank	Points	Rank
Simona Barutova; Nada Daabousova; Petra Durisova; Miroslava Kratinova; Sophia Lobpreisova; Diana Miskechova; Natalia Pivarciova; Rebecca Schererova Sarah Kartousova; Julia Bacharova^{Res} Alexandra Ratajova^{Res}	Team	138.7097	12 Q	139.8430	12

== Table Tennis ==
Slovakia has qualified the following quota places:

Men

Athlete	Event	Round of 64	Round of 32	Round of 16	Quarterfinal	Semifinal	Final / BM	
Athlete	Event	Opposition Score	Opposition Score	Opposition Score	Opposition Score	Opposition Score	Opposition Score	Rank
Ľubomír Pištej	Singles	Li (TUR); W 4–0	Freitas (POR); L 0–4	Did not advance				R32
Yang Wang	Singles	Karakašević (SRB); W 4–3	Boll (GER) w/o	Pitchford (GBR); L 2–4	Did not advance			R16

Women

Athlete	Event	Round of 64	Round of 32	Round of 16	Quarterfinal	Semifinal	Final / BM	
Athlete	Event	Opposition Score	Opposition Score	Opposition Score	Opposition Score	Opposition Score	Opposition Score	Rank
Eva Ódorová	Singles	Bergstrom (SWE); W 4–2	Yu (POR); W 4–1	Strbikova (CZE); W 4–2	Pesotska (UKR); W 4–1	Li (NED); L 0–4	Hu (TUR); L 1–4	4
Barbora Balážová	Singles	Galic (SLO); 4–1	Bilenko (UKR); 3–4	Did not advance				R32

== Taekwondo ==
Athlete	Event	Round of 16	Quarterfinals	Semifinals	Repechage	Bronze medal	Final	
Athlete	Event	Opposition Result	Opposition Result	Opposition Result	Opposition Result	Opposition Result	Opposition Result	Rank
Terézia Pavková	Women's −49 kg	(Croatia) Zaninovic (CRO); L 2–14	Did not advance					

== Triathlon ==
Athlete	Event	Swim (1.5 km)	Trans 1	Bike (40 km)	Trans 2	Run (10 km)	Total Time	Rank
Richard Varga	Men's	18:39	0:46	56:42	0:24	33:01	1:49:32 (+1:01)	5
Lukáš Šiška	Men's	19:55	0:50	1:03:51	0:27	35:54	2:00:57 (+12:26)	44
Romana Gajdošová	Women's	23:16	0:50	1:10:31	0:28	39:39	2:14:44 (+14:16)	33
Ivana Kuriačková	Women's	23:12	0:55	1:10:29	0:29	41:13	2:16:18 (+15:50)	35

== Swimming ==
Men

Athlete	Event	Heat		Semifinals		Final	
Athlete	Event	Time	Rank	Time	Rank	Time	Rank
Alexander Svetlík	50 m backstroke	27.58	32	Did not advance			
Alexander Svetlík	100 m backstroke	59.53	44	Did not advance			
Alexander Svetlík	200 m backstroke	2:09.43	30	Did not advance			
Peter Ďurišin	50 m breaststroke	29.20	18	Did not advance			
Peter Ďurišin	100 m breaststroke	1:05.15	30	Did not advance			
Vladimír Štefánik	50 m butterfly	25.15	29	Did not advance			
Vladimír Štefánik	100 m butterfly	55.32	15	54.59	12	Did not advance	
Vladimír Štefánik	100 m freestyle	51.57	29	Did not advance			

Women

Athlete	Event	Heat		Semifinals		Final	
Athlete	Event	Time	Rank	Time	Rank	Time	Rank
Lara Babská	50 m breaststroke	33.92	26	Did not advance			
Lara Babská	100 m breaststroke	1:15.76	34	Did not advance			
Zuzana Pavlikovská	100 m freestyle	59.82	51	Did not advance			
Zuzana Pavlikovská	200 m breaststroke	2:39.25	24	Did not advance			
Zuzana Pavlikovská	200 m individual medley	2:26.92	32	Did not advance			
Lucia Simovičová	50 m freestyle	27.26	33	Did not advance			
Lucia Simovičová	100 m freestyle	58.82	34	Did not advance			
Lucia Simovičová	50 m butterfly	28.52	27	Did not advance			

== Volleyball ==
Slovakia has qualified for the following events

=== Men's indoor ===
Group – Pool B

Pos	Team	Pld	W	L	Pts	SW	SL	SR	SPW	SPL	SPR	Qualification
1	Germany	5	4	1	12	13	3	4.333	391	330	1.185	Quarterfinals
2	Russia	5	4	1	12	13	5	2.600	438	384	1.141	Quarterfinals
3	Bulgaria	5	4	1	11	12	7	1.714	445	406	1.096	Quarterfinals
4	Slovakia	5	2	3	6	7	11	0.636	378	427	0.885	Quarterfinals
5	Belgium	5	1	4	3	6	14	0.429	391	461	0.848	
6	Italy	5	0	5	1	4	15	0.267	421	456	0.923	

Date	Time		Score		Set 1	Set 2	Set 3	Set 4	Set 5	Total	Report
14 Jun	09:00	Slovakia	3–1	Italy	25–23	25–22	22–25	25–21		97–91	Report
16 Jun	16:30	Germany	3–0	Slovakia	25–15	25–18	25–23			75–56	Report
18 Jun	11:00	Russia	3–1	Slovakia	24–26	25–17	25–18	25–20		99–81	Report
20 Jun	11:00	Slovakia	3–1	Belgium	25–22	19–25	25–21	25–19		94–87	Report
22 Jun	14:30	Bulgaria	3–0	Slovakia	25–14	25–17	25–19			75–50	Report

Quarter-finals

Date	Time		Score		Set 1	Set 2	Set 3	Set 4	Set 5	Total	Report
24 Jun	13:00	Poland	3–0	Slovakia	25–16	25–23	25–19			75–58	Report

== Water Polo ==
See Water polo at the 2015 European Games

=== Men's tournament ===
Group D

Pos	Team	Pld	W	D	L	GF	GA	GD	Pts	
1	Spain	3	3	0	0	46	22	+24	9	Qualification to quarterfinals
2	Serbia	3	2	0	1	41	18	+23	6	Qualification to play-offs
3	Slovakia	3	1	0	2	29	36	−7	3	Qualification to play-offs
4	Malta	3	0	0	3	15	55	−40	0	

First match(es) will be played: 13 June 2015. Source: baku2015.com

13 Jun 2015; 11:15	Game 2	Serbia	14–5	Slovakia	Baku

14 Jun 2015; 13:00	Game 3	Malta	8–15	Slovakia	Baku

15 Jun 2015; 11:15	Game 6	Spain	14–9	Slovakia	Baku

Play-off

16 Jun 2015	Game	Germany	13–7	Slovakia	Baku

=== Women's tournament ===
Group B

Pos	Team	Pld	W	D	L	GF	GA	GD	Pts	
1	Russia	5	4	1	0	89	29	+60	13	Qualification to semifinals
2	Spain	5	4	0	1	75	33	+42	12	Qualification to play-offs
3	Italy	5	3	1	1	76	37	+39	10	Qualification to play-offs
4	Slovakia	5	2	0	3	33	64	−31	6	
5	France	5	1	0	4	27	83	−56	3	
6	Serbia	5	0	0	5	26	80	−54	0	

First match(es) will be played: 12 June 2015. Source: baku2015.com

12 Jun 2015; 15:30	Game 2	Russia	13–4	Slovakia	Water Polo Arena, Baku

13 Jun 2015; 13:00	Game 5	Serbia	8–9	Slovakia	Water Polo Arena, Baku

14 Jun 2015; 15:00	Game 8	Slovakia	9–5	France	Water Polo Arena, Baku

15 Jun 2015; 13:00	Game 11	Spain	20–4	Slovakia	Water Polo Arena, Baku

16 Jun 2015; 14:15	Game 13	Slovakia	7–18	Italy	Water Polo Arena, Baku

== Wrestling ==
Men's Greco-Roman

Athlete	Event	Qualification	Round of 16	Quarterfinal	Semifinal	Repechage 1	Repechage 2	Final / BM	
Athlete	Event	Opposition Result	Opposition Result	Opposition Result	Opposition Result	Opposition Result	Opposition Result	Opposition Result	Rank
István Lévai	66 kg	Matias (GRE); W 4—1	Cascavilla (ITA); W 4—1	Surkov (RUS); L 0—4	Did not advance	BYE	Bjerrehuus (DEN); W 3—1	Demyankov (UKR); W 3—1	3rd place, bronze medalist(s)
Vojtech Jakuš	71 kg	Stäbler (GER); L 0—3	Did not advance						QR
Richard Rigo	75 kg	Mursaliyev (AZE); L 0—4	Did not advance			Puscasu (ROU); L 1—3	Did not advance		R16

Men's freestyle

Athlete	Event	Qualification	Round of 16	Quarterfinal	Semifinal	Repechage 1	Repechage 2	Final / BM	
Athlete	Event	Opposition Result	Opposition Result	Opposition Result	Opposition Result	Opposition Result	Opposition Result	Opposition Result	Rank
Róbert Olle	70 kg	BYE	Gor (TUR); L 0—4	Did not advance					R16
Mykola Bolotnjuk	61 kg	—N/a	Perpelita (MDA); W 3—1	Aliyev (AZE); L 0—4	Did not advance				QF
Jozef Jaloviar	97 kg	BYE	Hutter (SUI); W 3—1	Odikadze (GEO); L 1—3	Did not advance	BYE	Rumbutis (LTU); W 3—1	Andriitsev (UKR); L 0—4	4
Michal Duba	74 kg	Savvoulidis (GRE); L 0—4	Did not advance						QR
Soslan Gagloev	125 kg	Cuba Vazquez (ESP); W 4—0	Chintoan (ROU); W 4—1	Ligeti (HUN); W 3—1	Akgul (TUR); L 0—5	BYE	BYE	Magomedov (AZE); L 1—3	4

Women's freestyle

Athlete	Event	Qualification	Round of 16	Quarterfinal	Semifinal	Repechage 1	Repechage 2	Final / BM	
Athlete	Event	Opposition Result	Opposition Result	Opposition Result	Opposition Result	Opposition Result	Opposition Result	Opposition Result	Rank
Lenka Matejová	48 kg	BYE	Demirhan (TUR); L 0–5	Did not advance					R16
