= San Marino at the European Games =

- IOC code: SMR
- NOC: Sammarinese National Olympic Committee
- Website: www.cons.sm
- Medals: Gold 0 Silver 1 Bronze 2 Total 3

European Games appearances (overview)
- 2015; 2019; 2023; 2027

San Marino participated at the inaugural edition of the European Games in 2015.

== Medal tables ==
=== Medals by Games ===
Games	Athletes	Gold	Silver	Bronze	Total	Rank
(Azerbaijan) 2015 Baku	9	0	1	1	2	35
(Belarus) 2019 Minsk	5	0	0	1	1	43
(Poland) 2023 Kraków-Małopolska	32	0	0	0	0	–
(Turkey) 2027 Istanbul	Future event					
Total		0	1	2	3	43

=== Medals by sports ===
Sport	Gold	Silver	Bronze	Total
Shooting	0	1	1	2
Wrestling	0	0	1	1
Totals (2 entries)	0	1	2	3

== List of medallists ==
Medal	Name(s)	Games	Sport	Event
Silver	Arianna Perilli	(Azerbaijan) 2015 Baku	Shooting	Women's trap
Bronze	Alessandra Perilli; Manuel Mancini	(Azerbaijan) 2015 Baku	Shooting	Mixed trap
Bronze	Myles Amine	(Belarus) 2019 Minsk	Wrestling	Men's freestyle 86 kg

== See also ==
- San Marino at the Olympics
