= 2015 World Shotgun Championships =

Shooting competition

The 2015 World Shotgun Championships were held from 9 to 18 September 2015 in Lonato, Italy. As in all odd-numbered years, separate ISSF World Shooting Championships were carried out in the trap, Double Trap and skeet events.

== Competition schedule ==
Date	Men, Junior Men	Women, Junior Women
11 September	Trap, day 1	Trap
12 September	Trap, day 2	
13 September		Skeet
14 September	Double Trap	
15 September		
16 September	Skeet day 1	
17 September	Skeet, day 2	

== Men ==
Individual			Teams			Juniors			Junior teams		
Trap
1st place, gold medalist(s)	Erik Varga (SVK)	120 + 12(1) + 12(2)	1st place, gold medalist(s)	Russia; Alexey Alipov; Maksim Smyko; Denis Zotov	356	1st place, gold medalist(s)	Filip Praj (SVK)	115 + 13 + 13	1st place, gold medalist(s)	Russia; Maxim Kabatskiy; Nikita Bekasov; Nikita Egorov	342
2nd place, silver medalist(s)	Giovanni Pellielo (ITA)	120 + 13 + 12(1)	2nd place, silver medalist(s)	Italy; Giovanni Pellielo; Massimo Fabbrizi; Valerio Grazini	354	2nd place, silver medalist(s)	Luca Miotto (ITA)	117 + 15 + 12	2nd place, silver medalist(s)	Slovakia; Adrian Drobny; Filip Praj; Michal Slamka	337
3rd place, bronze medalist(s)	Maxime Mottet (BEL)	120 + 12(0) + 13	3rd place, bronze medalist(s)	San Marino; Stefano Selva; Gian Marco Berti; Manuel Mancini	352	3rd place, bronze medalist(s)	Adrian Drobny (SVK)	115 + 10(4) + 12	3rd place, bronze medalist(s)	Australia; Mitchell William Iles-Crevatin; Jack Wallace; Samuel John Bylsma	333
Double Trap
1st place, gold medalist(s)	Vasily Mosin (RUS)	140 + 28 + 29	1st place, gold medalist(s)	Great Britain; Tim Kneale; Matthew Coward-Holley; Matthew French	414	1st place, gold medalist(s)	Huang Xiaomin (CHN)	136 + 27 + 28	1st place, gold medalist(s)	Italy; Jacopo dal Moro; Ignazio Maria Tronca; Lorenzo Ferrari	382
2nd place, silver medalist(s)	Tim Kneale (GBR)	142 + 27 + 26	2nd place, silver medalist(s)	Russia; Vasily Mosin; Vitaly Fokeev; Artem Nekrasov	406	2nd place, silver medalist(s)	Kirill Fokeev (RUS)	133 + 26(20) + 27	2nd place, silver medalist(s)	Russia; Kirill Fokeev; Kamil Khusaenov; Viacheslav Yukhimenko	377
3rd place, bronze medalist(s)	Ahmad Al-Afasi (KUW)	138(6) + 26(2) + 24(4)	3rd place, bronze medalist(s)	India; Asab Mohd; Ankur Mittal; Sangram Dahiya	400	3rd place, bronze medalist(s)	Conner James Gorsuch (GBR)	133 + 26(5) + 27	3rd place, bronze medalist(s)	China; Huang Xiaomin; Zhao Shiqi; Cai Jinzhan	372
Skeet
1st place, gold medalist(s)	Vincent Hancock (USA)	122(4) + 16 + 16(8)	1st place, gold medalist(s)	France; Anthony Terras; Éric Delaunay; Emmanuel Petit	364	1st place, gold medalist(s)	Valerio Palmucci (ITA)	120 + 14(5) + 12	1st place, gold medalist(s)	Italy; Valerio Palmucci; Cristian Ciccotti; Matteo Chiti	357
2nd place, silver medalist(s)	Anthony Terras (FRA)	125EWR + 16 + 16(7)	2nd place, silver medalist(s)	Italy; Gabriele Rossetti; Luigi Lodde; Valerio Luchini	362	2nd place, silver medalist(s)	Phillip Russell Jungman (USA)	119 + 15 + 11	2nd place, silver medalist(s)	Finland; Eetu Kallioinen; Lari Pesonen; Timi Vallioniemi	351
3rd place, bronze medalist(s)	Gabriele Rossetti (ITA)	122(4) + 13 + 15	3rd place, bronze medalist(s)	United States; Vincent Hancock; Dustin David Perry; Thomas Bayer	360	3rd place, bronze medalist(s)	Nicolas Vasiliou (CYP)	120 + 14(4) + 15	3rd place, bronze medalist(s)	United States; Phillip Russell Jungman; Zachary McBee; Christian Elliott	350

== Women ==
Individual			Teams			Juniors			Junior teams		
Trap
1st place, gold medalist(s)	Fatima Galvez (ESP)	69(5) + 12 + 11	1st place, gold medalist(s)	Great Britain; Charlotte Kerwood; Kirsty Barr; Abbey Ling	203	1st place, gold medalist(s)	Alessia Iezzi (ITA)	69 + 12(2) + 11(4)	1st place, gold medalist(s)	Russia; Yulia Tugolukova; Iuliia Saveleva; Ekaterina Subbotina	198
2nd place, silver medalist(s)	Elena Tkach (RUS)	71 + 11(2) + 9	2nd place, silver medalist(s)	Finland; Marika Salmi; Noora Antikainen; Satu Mäkelä-Nummela	201	2nd place, silver medalist(s)	Yulia Tugolukova (RUS)	68 + 12(2) + 11(3)	2nd place, silver medalist(s)	Italy; Maria Lucia Palmitessa; Alessia Iezzi; Fiammetta Rossi	197
3rd place, bronze medalist(s)	Pak Yong Hui (PRK)	70 + 11(1) + 12	3rd place, bronze medalist(s)	Russia; Elena Tkach; Ekaterina Rabaya; Tatiana Barsuk	200	3rd place, bronze medalist(s)	Ellie Roditis (USA)	67(0+1) + 12(1) + 11	3rd place, bronze medalist(s)	United States; Ellie Roditis; Garce Hambuchen; Emily Hampson	186
Skeet
1st place, gold medalist(s)	Morgan Craft (USA)	73 + 15(4) + 15	1st place, gold medalist(s)	United States; Morgan Craft; Caitlin Connor; Kim Rhode	215 EWR	1st place, gold medalist(s)	Che Yufei (CHN)	68 + 13 + 11(4)	1st place, gold medalist(s)	United States; Dania Jo Vizzi; Katharina Monika Jacob; Sydney Carson	206 WRJ
2nd place, silver medalist(s)	Caitlin Connor (USA)	73 + 15(3+6) + 13	2nd place, silver medalist(s)	Italy; Katiuscia Spada; Diana Bacosi; Chiara Cainero	212	2nd place, silver medalist(s)	Sydney Carson (USA)	67 + 15 + 11(3)	2nd place, silver medalist(s)	Russia; Alina Fazylzyanova; Victoria Ostapets; Ekaterina Filimonova	192
3rd place, bronze medalist(s)	Wei Ning (CHN)	72 + 15(3+5) + 15	3rd place, bronze medalist(s)	China; Wei Ning; Wei Meng; Lin Piao Piao	209	3rd place, bronze medalist(s)	Dania Jo Vizzi (USA)	71 + 11 + 14	3rd place, bronze medalist(s)	Italy; Francesca del Prete; Chiara di Marziantonio; Francesca Grieco	190

== Medal summary ==
Rank	Nation	Gold	Silver	Bronze	Total
1	Italy	4	6	2	12
2	Russia	4	6	1	11
3	United States	4	3	5	12
4	Great Britain	2	1	1	4
4	Slovakia	2	1	1	4
6	China	2	0	3	5
7	France	1	1	0	2
8	Spain	1	0	0	1
9	Finland	0	2	0	2
10	Australia	0	0	1	1
10	Belgium	0	0	1	1
10	Cyprus	0	0	1	1
10	India	0	0	1	1
10	Kuwait	0	0	1	1
10	North Korea	0	0	1	1
10	San Marino	0	0	1	1
Totals (16 entries)		20	20	20	60
