= Shooting at the 2015 European Games – Women's trap =

Women's trap at the 2015 European Games
- Venue: Baku Shooting Centre
- Date: 16 June
- Competitors: 20 from 12 nations

Medalists
gold medal	Fátima Gálvez	Spain
silver medal	Arianna Perilli	San Marino
bronze medal	Elena Tkach	Russia

The Women's trap competition at the 2015 European Games in Baku, Azerbaijan was held on 16 June at the Baku Shooting Centre.

== Schedule ==
All times are local (UTC+5).

Date	Time	Event
Tuesday, 16 June 2015	11:25	Qualification
Tuesday, 16 June 2015	16:15	Final

== Results ==
=== Qualification ===
Rank	Athlete	Series			Total	S-off	Note
Rank	Athlete	1	2	3	Total	S-off	Note
1	Fátima Gálvez (ESP)	25	24	24	73		GR
2	Arianna Perilli (SMR)	22	24	25	71		
3	Satu Mäkelä-Nummela (FIN)	23	24	24	71		
4	Elena Tkach (RUS)	24	24	23	71		
5	Tatiana Barsuk (RUS)	24	23	23	70	+8	CB:53
6	Serdağ Saadet Kandıra (TUR)	24	23	23	70	+8	CB:51
7	Deborah Gelisio (ITA)	23	23	24	70	+7	
8	Zuzana Štefečeková (SVK)	21	24	25	70	+5	
9	Katrin Quooß (GER)	23	22	25	70	+1	
10	Eva Clemente (ESP)	23	24	23	70	+1	
11	Marina Sauzet (FRA)	22	23	24	69		
12	Abbey Ling (GBR)	23	24	22	69		
13	Alessandra Perilli (SMR)	24	25	20	69		
14	Jessica Rossi (ITA)	23	22	23	68		
15	Mopsi Veromaa (FIN)	24	21	23	68		
16	Carole Cormenier (FRA)	23	22	22	67		
17	Charlotte Kerwood (GBR)	24	22	21	67		
18	Jana Beckmann (GER)	21	21	21	63		
19	Jasmina Maček (SLO)	21	21	17	59		
20	Alina Rafikhanova (AZE)	14	16	17	47		

=== Semifinal ===
Rank	Athlete	Score	S-off
1	Fátima Gálvez (ESP)	14	
1	Arianna Perilli (SMR)	14	
3	Elena Tkach (RUS)	13	
4	Tatiana Barsuk (RUS)	12	2
5	Satu Mäkelä-Nummela (FIN)	12	1
6	Serdağ Saadet Kandıra (TUR)	7	

=== Finals ===
==== Bronze medal match ====
Rank	Athlete	Score	S-off
3rd place, bronze medalist(s)	Elena Tkach (RUS)	14	
4	Tatiana Barsuk (RUS)	11	

==== Gold medal match ====
Rank	Athlete	Score	S-off
1st place, gold medalist(s)	Fátima Gálvez (ESP)	13	
2nd place, silver medalist(s)	Arianna Perilli (SMR)	11	
