= 2013 European Shotgun Championships =

- Dates: 28 July - 8 August
- Host city: Suhl, Germany
- Level: Senior & junior
- Events: 28 (20 men, 8 women)

The 2013 European Shotgun Championships (Running Target & Shotgun) were held in Suhl, Germany. 14 events were held over the competition's length, including 10 events for men and 4 for women. The competition was held over 11 days.

== Men's events ==
Event	Gold	Silver	Bronze
50m Running Target	Emil Martinsson (SWE)	Mikhail Azarenko (RUS)	Lukasz Czapla (POL)
50m Running Target TEAM	Russia; Mikhail Azarenko; Dmitry Romanov; Dimitri Lykin	Ukraine; Andrey Gilchenko; Yehor Chyrva; Vladislav Prianishnikov	Czech Republic; Miroslav Januš; Bedrich Jonas; Josef Nikl
50m Running Target Mixed	Mikhail Azarenko (RUS)	Maxim Stepanov (RUS)	Dmitry Romanov (RUS)
50m Running Target Mixed TEAM	Russia; Mikhail Azarenko; Maxim Stepanov; Dmitry Romanov	Czech Republic; Miroslav Januš; Josef Nikl; Bedrich Jonas	Hungary; Jozef Sike; Tamás Tasi; László Boros
Trap	Josip Glasnović (CRO)	Massimo Fabbrizi (ITA)	Derek Burnett (IRL)
Trap TEAM	Croatia; Josip Glasnović; Giovanni Cernogoraz; Anton Glasnović	Slovakia; Erik Varga; Roman Čavaraz; Marián Kovačócy	France; Stéphane Clamens; Kevin Gaillard; Antonin Desert
Double Trap	Vasily Mosin (RUS)	Marco Innocenti (ITA)	Emanuele Bernasconi (ITA)
Double Trap TEAM	Italy; Marco Innocenti; Emanuele Bernasconi; Davide Gasparini	Russia; Vasily Mosin; Artem Nekrasov; Vitaly Fokeev	Germany; Andreas Löw; Michael Goldbrunner; Waldemar Schanz
Skeet	Tom Jensen (NOR)	Luigi Lodde (ITA)	Georgios Achilleos (CYP)
Skeet TEAM	Norway; Tom Jensen; Tore Brovold; Ole Eilif Undseth	Germany; Sven Korte; Gorden Gosch; Ralf Buchheim	Cyprus; Georgios Achilleos; Antonakis Andreou; Andreas Chasikos

== Women's events ==
Event	Gold	Silver	Bronze
Trap	Jessica Rossi (ITA)	Zuzana Stefecekova (SVK)	Federica Caporuscio (ITA)
Trap TEAM	Italy; Federica Caporuscio; Jessica Rossi; Silvana Stanco	Russia; Elena Tkach; Tatiana Barsuk; Irina Laricheva	Slovakia; Jana Mezeiová; Zuzana Stefecekova; Lucia Boorová
Skeet	Chiara Cainero (ITA)	Cigdem Ozyaman (TUR)	Danka Bartekova (SVK)
Skeet TEAM	Italy; Katiuscia Spada; Chiara Cainero; Diana Bacosi	Great Britain; Amber Hill; Elena Allen; Diane Le Grelle	Slovakia; Danka Barteková; Monika Zemkova; Andrea Stranovská

== Men's Junior events ==
Event	Gold	Silver	Bronze
50m Running Target	Ihor Kizyma (UKR)	Benoit Germain (FRA)	Stanislav Los (UKR)
50m Running Target TEAM	Ukraine; Ihor Kizyma; Stanislav Los; Vladislav Shchepotkin	Finland; Heikki Lahdekorpi; Jani Suoranta; Mika Kinisjarvi	France; Benoit Germain; Eric Schuller; Alexis Mornet
50m Running Target Mixed	Ihor Kizyma (UKR)	Heikki Lähdekorpi (FIN)	Jani Suoranta (FIN)
50m Running Target Mixed TEAM	Ukraine; Ihor Kizyma; Stanislav Los; Vladislav Shchepotkin	Finland; Heikki Lahdekorpi; Jani Suoranta; Mika Kinisjarvi	Germany; Robert Lösekann; Emeran Mayer; Marcel Trottier
Trap	Carlo Mancarella (ITA)	Filip Praj (SVK)	Nemanja Smiljanić (SRB)
Trap TEAM	Italy; Diego Meoni; Carlo Mancarella; Luca Miotto	Czech Republic; Vladimír Štěpán; Pavel Vaněk; Jan Borkovec	Serbia; Nemanja Smiljanić; Maksim Egelja; Borko Vasiljević
Double Trap	Nathan Lee Xuereb (MLT)	Kirill Fokeev (RUS)	Roman Zagumennov (RUS)
Double Trap TEAM	Russia; Anton Slepushkin; Roman Zagumennov; Kirill Fokeev	Italy; Andrea Vescovi; Lorenzo Belei; Jacopo Trevisan	Great Britain; Max Jeffrey; Gareth Stanford-Iddon; Timothy Hawkins
Skeet	Domenico Simeone (ITA)	Nicolas Vasiliou (CYP)	Tammaro Cassandro (ITA)
Skeet TEAM	Italy; Tammaro Cassandro; Domenico Simeone; Gabriele Rossetti	Cyprus; George Kazakos; Nicolas Vasiliou; Menelaos Michaelides	Czech Republic; Miloš Slavíček; Matej Novota; František Kadlec

== Women's Junior events ==
Event	Gold	Silver	Bronze
Trap	Valeria Raffaelli (ITA)	Adeline Couet (FRA)	Nina Slamkova (SVK)
Trap TEAM	Italy; Valeria Raffaelli; Alessia Montanino; Maria Palmitessa	Russia; Zoya Khokhlova; Svetlana Krasheninnikova; Alina Chemchugova	Turkey; Safiye Sariturk; Bursa Cerci; Serdağ Saadet Kandıra
Skeet	Natalia Vinogradova (RUS)	Nadine Messerschmidt (GER)	Iryna Malovichko (UKR)
Skeet TEAM	Russia; Natalia Vinogradova; Viktoriia Golovko; Victoria Ostapets	Ukraine; Iryna Malovichko; Daria Tokareva; Anastasiia Koira	Czech Republic; Jitka Pešková; Ratka Macikova; Barbora Šumová

== Medal summary ==
=== Seniors ===
* Host nation (Germany)

Rank	Nation	Gold	Silver	Bronze	Total
1	Italy	5	3	2	10
2	Russia	4	4	1	9
3	Croatia	2	0	0	2
3	Norway	2	0	0	2
5	Sweden	1	0	0	1
6	Slovakia	0	2	3	5
7	Czech Republic	0	1	1	2
7	Germany*	0	1	1	2
9	Great Britain	0	1	0	1
9	Turkey	0	1	0	1
9	Ukraine	0	1	0	1
12	Cyprus	0	0	2	2
13	France	0	0	1	1
13	Hungary	0	0	1	1
13	Ireland	0	0	1	1
13	Poland	0	0	1	1
Totals (16 entries)		14	14	14	42

=== Juniors ===
* Host nation (Germany)

Rank	Nation	Gold	Silver	Bronze	Total
1	Italy	6	1	1	8
2	Ukraine	4	1	2	7
3	Russia	3	2	1	6
4	Malta	1	0	0	1
5	Finland	0	3	1	4
6	France	0	2	1	3
7	Cyprus	0	2	0	2
8	Czech Republic	0	1	2	3
9	Germany*	0	1	1	2
9	Slovakia	0	1	1	2
11	Serbia	0	0	2	2
12	Great Britain	0	0	1	1
12	Turkey	0	0	1	1
Totals (13 entries)		14	14	14	42
