= San Marino at the 2015 European Games =

- IOC code: SMR
- NOC: Sammarinese National Olympic Committee
- Website: www.cons.sm

in Baku, Azerbaijan 12 – 28 June 2015
- Competitors: 9 in 6 sports
- Flag bearer: Alessandra Perilli
- Medals Ranked 35th: Gold 0 Silver 1 Bronze 1 Total 2

European Games appearances (overview)
- 2015; 2019; 2023; 2027

San Marino competed at the 2015 European Games, in Baku, Azerbaijan from 12 to 28 June 2015.

It was announced that San Marino would be entering 18 athletes, to compete in the games.

== Medalists ==
Medal	Name	Sport	Event	Date
Silver	Arianna Perilli	Shooting	Women's trap	17 June
Bronze	Alessandra Perilli; Manuel Mancini	Shooting	Mixed trap	18 June

== Archery ==
Athlete	Event	Ranking round		Round of 64	Round of 32	Round of 16	Quarterfinals	Semifinals	Final / BM	
Athlete	Event	Score	Seed	Opposition Score	Opposition Score	Opposition Score	Opposition Score	Opposition Score	Opposition Score	Rank
Emanuele Guidi	Men's individual	577	63	van der Ven (Netherlands); L 0–6	Did not advance					33

== Athletics ==
Men

Athlete	Event	Heat		
Athlete	Event	Result	Rank	Points
Joseph William Guerra	1500 m	3:58.53	8	7
Joseph William Guerra	3000 m	8:47.94	7	8
Andrea Ercolani Volta	400 m Hurdles	53.70	6	9
Matteo Mosconi	Men's 110 Hurdles	DNS		
Eugenio Rossi	Men's High Jump	2.15	6	9
Federico Gorrieri	Men's Long Jump	6.79	10	5
Federico Gorrieri	Men's Triple Jump	13.58	10	5

Women

Athlete	Event	Heat		
Athlete	Event	Result	Rank	Points
Martina Muraccini	Women's Pole Vault	3.20	6	9

== Judo ==
Women

Athlete	Event	Round of 32	Round of 16	Quarterfinals	Semifinals	Repechage	Final / BM	
Athlete	Event	Opposition Result	Opposition Result	Opposition Result	Opposition Result	Opposition Result	Opposition Result	Rank
Jessica Zannoni	78 kg	BYE	Kocaturk (TUR); L 100—0	Did not advance				R16

== Shooting ==
Men

Athlete	Event	Qualification		Semi-final		Final	
Athlete	Event	Points	Rank	Points	Rank	Points	Rank
Manuel Mancini	Men's Trap	122	6	11	5	Did not advance	

Women

Athlete	Event	Qualification		Semi-final		Final	
Athlete	Event	Points	Rank	Points	Rank	Points	Rank
Alessandra Perilli	Women's Trap	69	13	Did not advance			
Arianna Perilli	Women's Trap	71	2	14	2	11	2nd place, silver medalist(s)

Mixed

Athlete	Event	Qualification		Semifinal		Final	
Athlete	Event	Points	Rank	Points	Rank	Points	Rank
Manuel Mancini; Alessandra Perilli	Trap	88	6	23	2	27	3rd place, bronze medalist(s)

== Swimming ==
Women

Athlete	Event	Heat		Semifinal		Final	
Athlete	Event	Time	Rank	Time	Rank	Time	Rank
Beatrice Felici	50 m freestyle	27.40	37	Did not advance			
Beatrice Felici	100 m freestyle	1:00.06	54	Did not advance			
Elena Giovannini	200 m freestyle	2:07.88	34	Did not advance			
Elena Giovannini	400 m freestyle	4:28.98	27	Did not advance			

== Table tennis ==
Athlete	Event	Round 1	Round 2	Round 3	Round 4	Quarterfinals	Semifinals	Final	
Athlete	Event	Opposition Result	Opposition Result	Opposition Result	Opposition Result	Opposition Result	Opposition Result	Opposition Result	Rank
Letizia Giardi	Women's singles	Erdelji (SRB); L 3—0	Did not advance						R1

== Taekwondo ==
Athlete	Event	Preliminary Round	Quarterfinals	Semifinals	Repechage	Bronze medal	Final	
Athlete	Event	Opposition Result	Opposition Result	Opposition Result	Opposition Result	Opposition Result	Opposition Result	Rank
Michele Ceccaroni	Men's −68 kg	Denisenko (RUS); L 19—1	Did not advance					PR
