= Shooting at the 2015 European Games – Men's trap =

Men's trap at the 2015 European Games
- Venue: Baku Shooting Centre
- Date: 16–17 June
- Competitors: 32 from 20 nations

Medalists
gold medal	Alexey Alipov	Russia
silver medal	Erik Varga	Slovakia
bronze medal	Giovanni Pellielo	Italy

The men's trap competition at the 2015 European Games in Baku, Azerbaijan was held on 16 and 17 June at the Baku Shooting Centre.

== Schedule ==
All times are local (UTC+5).

Date	Time	Event
Tuesday, 16 June 2015	10:30	Qualification
Wednesday, 17 June 2015	10:30	Qualification
Wednesday, 17 June 2015	14:30	Semifinal
Wednesday, 17 June 2015	14:45	Finals

== Results ==
=== Qualification ===
Rank	Athlete	Series					Total	Note
Rank	Athlete	1	2	3	4	5	Total	Note
1	Alexey Alipov (RUS)	25	25	25	23	25	123	GR
2	Erik Varga (SVK)	24	25	25	25	24	123	GR
3	Giovanni Pellielo (ITA)	24	24	25	24	25	122	
4	Edward Ling (GBR)	24	25	24	24	25	122	
5	Jesús Serrano (ESP)	25	24	25	24	24	122	
6	Manuel Mancini (SMR)	25	25	25	23	24	122	
7	Antonin Desert (FRA)	24	25	24	24	24	121	
8	Massimo Fabbrizi (ITA)	24	25	23	24	24	120	
9	Andras Szollar (HUN)	24	24	25	23	24	120	
10	Derek Burnett (IRL)	25	25	23	24	23	120	
11	Alberto Fernández (ESP)	25	25	22	22	25	119	
12	Piotr Kowalczyk (POL)	24	23	24	24	24	119	
13	Jakub Trzebinski (POL)	23	25	24	23	24	119	
14	João Azevedo (POR)	23	25	23	25	23	119	
15	Oğuzhan Tüzün (TUR)	23	25	25	23	23	119	
16	Norbert Hegyi (HUN)	25	23	25	23	23	119	
17	David Kostelecký (CZE)	25	24	24	23	23	119	
18	Anton Glasnović (CRO)	23	24	24	22	25	118	
19	Marian Kovacocy (SVK)	24	23	25	24	22	118	
20	Boštjan Maček (SLO)	25	24	22	21	25	117	
21	Josip Glasnović (CRO)	24	24	23	23	23	117	
22	Jiří Lipták (CZE)	24	25	23	23	22	117	
23	Denis Zotov (RUS)	22	24	23	24	23	116	
24	Jose Manuel Bruno Faria (POR)	23	24	23	24	22	116	
25	Lyndon Sosa (LUX)	24	23	21	23	24	115	
26	Alexandru Bicov (MDA)	25	23	23	20	24	115	
27	Bradley Davis (GBR)	25	24	21	23	22	115	
28	Andreas Makri (CYP)	24	23	24	22	22	115	
29	Karsten Bindrich (GER)	22	22	24	21	24	113	
30	Andreas Scherhaufer (AUT)	22	22	22	22	23	111	
31	Elvin Ismayilov (AZE)	24	23	21	20	21	109	
32	Alimirza Guliyev (AZE)	22	24	23	16	22	107	

=== Semifinal ===
Rank	Athlete	Score	S-off
1	Erik Varga (SVK)	15	
2	Alexey Alipov (RUS)	13	8
3	Giovanni Pellielo (ITA)	13	7
4	Edward Ling (GBR)	12	
5	Manuel Mancini (SMR)	11	3
6	Jesús Serrano (ESP)	11	2

=== Finals ===
==== Bronze medal match ====
Rank	Athlete	Score	S-off
3rd place, bronze medalist(s)	Giovanni Pellielo (ITA)	13	
4	Edward Ling (GBR)	11	

==== Gold medal match ====
Rank	Athlete	Score	S-off
1st place, gold medalist(s)	Alexey Alipov (RUS)	15	
2nd place, silver medalist(s)	Erik Varga (SVK)	14	
