= Shooting at the 2015 European Games =

- Venue: Baku Shooting Centre, Baku
- Dates: 13–19 June 2015
- Competitors: 330

Shooting competitions at the 2015 European Games in Baku were held from 13 to 19 June 2015 at the Baku Shooting centre.

Nineteen events were in the program with 330 athletes participating. The programme featured several non-Olympic Mixed team events. The winners of the fifteen Olympic events automatically qualified to the 2016 Summer Olympics.

== Qualification ==
The bulk (295 from 330) of qualification quota places were awarded based on European rankings as of 31 December 2014. The quota places were for athletes who were among: - 33 top-ranked in Men's Trap and Skeet; - 30 top-ranked in all individual Pistol and Rifle events of either gender; - 18 top-ranked in Women's Trap and Skeet, and Men's Double Trap.

The maximum number of athletes per country was 2 in each event. Should there be among the top ranked athletes more than 2 then the exceeding places are added to the pool of Universality places, in order to increase the number of nations represented. Host country athletes were not restricted to the ranking qualification standard. Azerbaijan was guaranteed 9 host quota places, 5 for men and 4 for women.

Mixed events were not subject to the quota qualification standard. Nations with entries in both the relevant men's and women's events would be able to compete with existing shooters.

== Medal summary ==
=== Men's events ===
Event	Gold	Silver	Bronze
10 meter air pistol	Damir Mikec; Serbia	João Costa; Portugal	Juraj Tužinský; Slovakia
10 meter air rifle	Vitali Bubnovich; Belarus	Niccolò Campriani; Italy	Sergey Richter; Israel
25 meter rapid fire pistol	Christian Reitz; Germany	Alexei Klimov; Russia	Oliver Geis; Germany
50 meter pistol	Damir Mikec; Serbia	Pavol Kopp; Slovakia	Abdullah Ömer Alimoğlu; Turkey
50 meter rifle prone	Henri Junghänel; Germany	Marco De Nicolo; Italy	Sergei Martynov; Belarus
50 meter rifle three positions	Valérian Sauveplane; France	Petar Gorša; Croatia	Vitali Bubnovich; Belarus
Skeet	Valerio Luchini; Italy	Stefan Nilsson; Sweden	Marko Kemppainen; Finland
Trap	Alexey Alipov; Russia	Erik Varga; Slovakia	Giovanni Pellielo; Italy
Double trap	Vitaly Fokeev; Russia	Richárd Bognár; Hungary	Antonino Barillà; Italy

=== Women's events ===
Event	Gold	Silver	Bronze
10 meter air pistol	Zorana Arunović; Serbia	Sonia Franquet; Spain	Viktoria Chaika; Belarus
10 meter air rifle	Andrea Arsović; Serbia	Sarah Hornung; Switzerland	Barbara Engleder; Germany
25 meter pistol	Heidi Diethelm Gerber; Switzerland	Antoaneta Boneva; Bulgaria	Monika Karsch; Germany
50 meter rifle three positions	Petra Zublasing; Italy	Laurence Brize; France	Olivia Hofmann; Austria
Skeet	Amber Hill; Great Britain	Diana Bacosi; Italy	Chiara Cainero; Italy
Trap	Fátima Gálvez; Spain	Arianna Perilli; San Marino	Elena Tkach; Russia

=== Mixed events ===
Event	Gold	Silver	Bronze
10 meter air pistol	Germany; Christian Reitz; Monika Karsch	Greece; Anna Korakaki; Konstantinos Malgarinos	Russia; Vladimir Gontcharov; Ekaterina Korshunova
10 meter air rifle	Italy; Niccolò Campriani; Petra Zublasing	Denmark; Steffen Olsen; Stine Nielsen	Russia; Sergey Kruglov; Daria Vdovina
Skeet	Italy; Valerio Luchini; Diana Bacosi	Cyprus; Georgios Achilleos; Andri Eleftheriou	France; Anthony Terras; Lucie Anastassiou
Trap	Slovakia; Erik Varga; Zuzana Štefečeková	Russia; Alexey Alipov; Elena Tkach	San Marino; Manuel Mancini; Alessandra Perilli

== Medal table ==
Rank	Nation	Gold	Silver	Bronze	Total
1	Italy (ITA)	4	3	3	10
2	Serbia (SRB)	4	0	0	4
3	Germany (GER)	3	0	3	6
4	Russia (RUS)	2	2	3	7
5	Slovakia (SVK)	1	2	1	4
6	France (FRA)	1	1	1	3
7	Spain (ESP)	1	1	0	2
7	Switzerland (SUI)	1	1	0	2
9	Belarus (BLR)	1	0	3	4
10	Great Britain (GBR)	1	0	0	1
11	San Marino (SMR)	0	1	1	2
12	Bulgaria (BUL)	0	1	0	1
12	Croatia (CRO)	0	1	0	1
12	Cyprus (CYP)	0	1	0	1
12	Denmark (DEN)	0	1	0	1
12	Greece (GRE)	0	1	0	1
12	Hungary (HUN)	0	1	0	1
12	Portugal (POR)	0	1	0	1
12	Sweden (SWE)	0	1	0	1
20	Austria (AUT)	0	0	1	1
20	Finland (FIN)	0	0	1	1
20	Israel (ISR)	0	0	1	1
20	Turkey (TUR)	0	0	1	1
Totals (23 entries)		19	19	19	57

== Participating nations ==
A total of 330 athletes from 48 nations competed in Shooting at the 2015 European Games:

- Albania (1)
- Andorra (1)
- Armenia (2)
- Austria (7)
- Azerbaijan (10)
- Belgium (3)
- Bosnia and Herzegovina (1)
- Belarus (8)
- Bulgaria (4)
- Croatia (12)
- Cyprus (6)
- Czech Republic (14)
- Denmark (5)
- Spain (12)
- Estonia (4)
- Finland (8)
- France (18)
- Georgia (4)
- Germany (22)
- Great Britain (13)
- Greece (4)
- Hungary (12)
- Ireland (1)
- Iceland (2)
- Israel (5)
- Italy (23)
- Kosovo (2)
- Latvia (2)
- Lithuania (2)
- Luxembourg (2)
- Macedonia (1)
- Malta (2)
- Montenegro (1)
- Moldova (1)
- Netherlands (1)
- Norway (8)
- Poland (11)
- Portugal (4)
- Romania (1)
- Russia (28)
- San Marino (3)
- Serbia (12)
- Slovakia (11)
- Slovenia (6)
- Sweden (5)
- Switzerland (10)
- Turkey (5)
- Ukraine (14)
