= 2018 European Shotgun Championships =

Sport competition

- Dates: 30 July - 13 August
- Host city: Leobersdorf, Austria
- Level: Senior
- Events: 14

The 2018 European Shotgun Championships was the 64th edition of the global shotgun competition, European Shotgun Championships, organised by the European Shooting Confederation.

== Results ==
=== Men ===
Event	1st place, gold medalist(s)	2nd place, silver medalist(s)	3rd place, bronze medalist(s)
Trap (03.08)	Boštjan Maček; Slovenia; 46 pts.	Anton Glasnović; Croatia; 44 pts.	Jiří Lipták; Czech Republic; 35 pts.
Trap (team)	Italy; Emanuele Buccolieri; Mauro De Filippis; Giovanni Pellielo; 66	Portugal; João Azevedo; Armelim Rodrigues; Jose Silva; 56	France; Antonin Desert; Sebastian Guerrero; Dorian Oblet; 60
Double trap (06.08)	Antonino Barillà; Italy; 146	Artiom Nekrasov; Russia; 141	Hubert Andrzej Olejnik; Slovakia; 139
Double trap (team)	Italy; Antonino Barillà; Ignazio Tronca; Alessandro Chianese; 415	Russia; Artem Nekrasov; Vasily Mosin; Alexander Furasyev; 393	Austria; Michael Auer; Armin Royda; Christian Keimelmayr; 299
Skeet (10.08)	Jesper Hansen; Denmark; 55	Erik Watndal; Norway; 52	Alexandr Zemlin; Russia; 42
Skeet (team)	Czech Republic; Tomáš Nýdrle; Miloš Slavíček; Jakub Tomeček; 56	Italy; Riccardo Filippelli; Gabriele Rossetti; Giancarlo Tazza; 54	Russia; Anton Astakhov; Yaroslav Startsev; Alexander Zemlin; 55

=== Women ===
Event	1st place, gold medalist(s)	2nd place, silver medalist(s)	3rd place, bronze medalist(s)
Trap (03.08)	Mélanie Couzy; France; 41 pts.	Kirsty Barr; Great Britain; 39 pts.	Zuzana Rehák-Štefečeková; Slovakia; 31 pts.
Trap (team)	Italy; Federica Caporuscio; Maria Lucia Pamitessa; Jessica Rossi; 59	Germany; Sarah Bindrich; Katrin Quooß; Sonja Scheibl; 50	Finland; Noora Antikainen; Satu Mäkelä-Nummela; Mopsi Veromaa; 61
Double trap (06.08)	Claudia De Luca; Italy; 131	Zuzana Rehák-Štefečeková; Slovakia; 119	Sofia Maglio; Italy; 114
Skeet (10.08)	Danka Barteková; Slovakia; 54	Lucie Anastassiou; France; 52	Victoria Larsson; Sweden; 43
Skeet (team)	Slovakia; Danka Barteková; Lucia Kopcanová; Veronika Sýkorová; 47	Germany; Vanessa Hauff; Nadine Messerschmidt; Katrin Wieslhuber; 45	Italy; Diana Bacosi; Chiara Cainero; Katiuscia Spada; 57

=== Mixed ===
Event	1st place, gold medalist(s)	2nd place, silver medalist(s)	3rd place, bronze medalist(s)
Trap team (05.08)	Jessica Rossi; Giovanni Pellielo; Italy; 47 pts.	Zuzana Rehák-Štefečeková; Erik Varga; Slovakia; 44 pts.	Safiye Sarıtürk; Oğuzhan Tüzün; Turkey; 29 pts.
Double trap team (06.08)	Zuzana Rehák-Štefečeková; Hubert Andrzej Olejnik; Slovakia; 67	Claudia De Luca; Antonino Barillà; Italy; 63	Sofia Maglio; Ignazio Tronca; Italy; 48
Skeet team (12.08)	Lucie Anastassiou; Anthony Terras; France; 55	Diana Bacosi; Gabriele Rossetti; Italy; 53	Nadine Messerschmidt; Sven Korte; Germany; 44

== Medal table ==
#	Country	1st place, gold medalist(s)	2nd place, silver medalist(s)	3rd place, bronze medalist(s)	Tot.
1	Italy	6	3	3	12
2	Slovakia	3	2	2	7
3	France	2	1	1	4
4	Czech Republic	1	0	1	2
5	Denmark	1	0	0	1
5	Slovenia	1	0	0	1
7	Russia	0	2	2	4
8	Germany	0	2	1	3
9	Croatia	0	1	0	1
9	Great Britain	0	1	0	1
9	Norway	0	1	0	1
9	Portugal	0	1	0	1
13	Austria	0	0	1	1
13	Finland	0	0	1	1
13	Sweden	0	0	1	1
13	Turkey	0	0	1	1
	TOTAL	14	14	14	42

== See also ==
- Shotgun
- European Shooting Confederation
- International Shooting Sport Federation
