= Antonino Barillà (sport shooter) =

Italian sports shooter (born 1987)

Personal information
- Born: 28 November 1987 (age 38) Reggio di Calabria, Italy
- Height: 187 cm (6 ft 2 in)
- Weight: 96 kg (212 lb)

Sport
- Sport: Sports shooting
- Club: G.S. Marina Militare
Medal record
Men's shooting
Representing Italy
World Championships
Gold medal – first place	2014 Granada	Double trap team
Gold medal – first place	2017 Moscow	Double trap team
Gold medal – first place	2019 Lonato del Garda	Double trap
Silver medal – second place	2014 Granada	Double trap
Bronze medal – third place	2013 Lima	Double trap team
European Games
Bronze medal – third place	2015 Baku	Double trap
European Championships
Gold medal – first place	2017 Baku	Double trap team
Gold medal – first place	2018 Leobersdorf	Double trap
Universiade
Gold medal – first place	2013 Kazan	Double trap
Silver medal – second place	2013 Kazan	Double trap team
Bronze medal – third place	2011 Shenzhen	Double trap team
ISSF Grand Prix
Gold medal – first place	2019 Lonato del Garda	Double trap team

Antonino Barillà (born 28 November 1987) is an Italian sports shooter. He competed in the men's double trap event at the 2016 Summer Olympics. Barillà is an athlete of the Gruppo Sportivo della Marina Militare.
