= Shooting at the 2015 European Games – Mixed Trap =

Mixed's trap at the 2015 European Games
- Venue: Baku Shooting Centre
- Date: 18 June 2015
- Competitors: 20 from 10 nations

Medalists
gold medal	Erik Varga; Zuzana Štefečeková	Slovakia
silver medal	Alexey Alipov; Elena Tkach	Russia
bronze medal	Manuel Mancini; Alessandra Perilli	San Marino

The Mixed trap competition at the 2015 European Games in Baku, Azerbaijan was held on 18 June 2015 at the Baku Shooting Centre.

== Schedule ==
All times are local (UTC+5).

Date	Time	Event
Thurseday, 16 June 2015	11:00	Qualification
Thurseday, 16 June 2015	15:45	Final

== Results ==
Rank	Team	Series		Total	Notes
Rank	Team	1	2	Total	Notes
1	Slovakia (SVK)	47	47	94	
	Zuzana Štefečeková	22	23	45	
	Erik Varga	25	24	49	
2	France (FRA)	43	48	91	
	Carole Cormenier	22	24	46	
	Antonin Desert	21	24	45	
3	Russia (RUS)	45	45	90	
	Elena Tkach	23	20	43	
	Alexey Alipov	22	25	47	
4	Italy (ITA)	45	45	90	
	Jessica Rossi	22	20	42	
	Giovanni Pellielo	23	25	48	
5	Spain (ESP)	44	44	88	
	Fátima Gálvez	20	22	42	
	Alberto Fernández	24	22	46	
6	San Marino (SMR)	43	45	88	
	Alessandra Perilli	21	23	44	
	Manuel Mancini	22	22	44	
7	Germany (GER)	46	39	85	
	Katrin Quooss	24	19	43	
	Karsten Bindrich	22	20	42	
8	Slovenia (SLO)	44	40	84	
	Jasmina Maček	20	16	36	
	Boštjan Maček	24	24	48	
9	Turkey (TUR)	38	45	83	
	Serdağ Saadet Kandıra	17	21	38	
	Oğuzhan Tüzün	21	24	45	
10	Azerbaijan (AZE)	40	34	74	
	Alina Rafikhanova	17	16	33	
	Elvin Ismayilov	23	18	41	

=== Semi-final ===
==== Semi-final 1 ====
Rank	Team	Total	Notes
1	Slovakia (SVK)	28	
	Zuzana Štefečeková	14	
	Erik Varga	14	
2	Spain (ESP)	24	
	Fátima Gálvez	11	
	Alberto Fernández	13	
3	Italy (ITA)	14	
	Jessica Rossi	4	
	Giovanni Pellielo	10	

==== Semi-final 2 ====
Rank	Team	Total	Notes
1	Russia (RUS)	24	
	Elena Tkach	10	
	Alexey Alipov	14	
2	San Marino (SMR)	23	
	Alessandra Perilli	12	
	Manuel Mancini	11	
3	France (FRA)	13	
	Carole Cormenier	6	
	Antonin Desert	7	

=== Finals ===
==== Bronze medal match ====
Rank	Team	Total	Notes
3rd place, bronze medalist(s)	San Marino (SMR)	27	S-off:1
	Alessandra Perilli	13	
	Manuel Mancini	14	
4	Spain (ESP)	27	S-off:0
	Fátima Gálvez	12	
	Alberto Fernández	15	

==== Gold medal match ====
Rank	Team	Total	Notes
1st place, gold medalist(s)	Slovakia (SVK)	27	
	Zuzana Štefečeková	14	
	Erik Varga	13	
2nd place, silver medalist(s)	Russia (RUS)	21	
	Elena Tkach	9	
	Alexey Alipov	12	
