= Zuzana Rehák-Štefečeková =

Slovak sport shooter (born 1984)

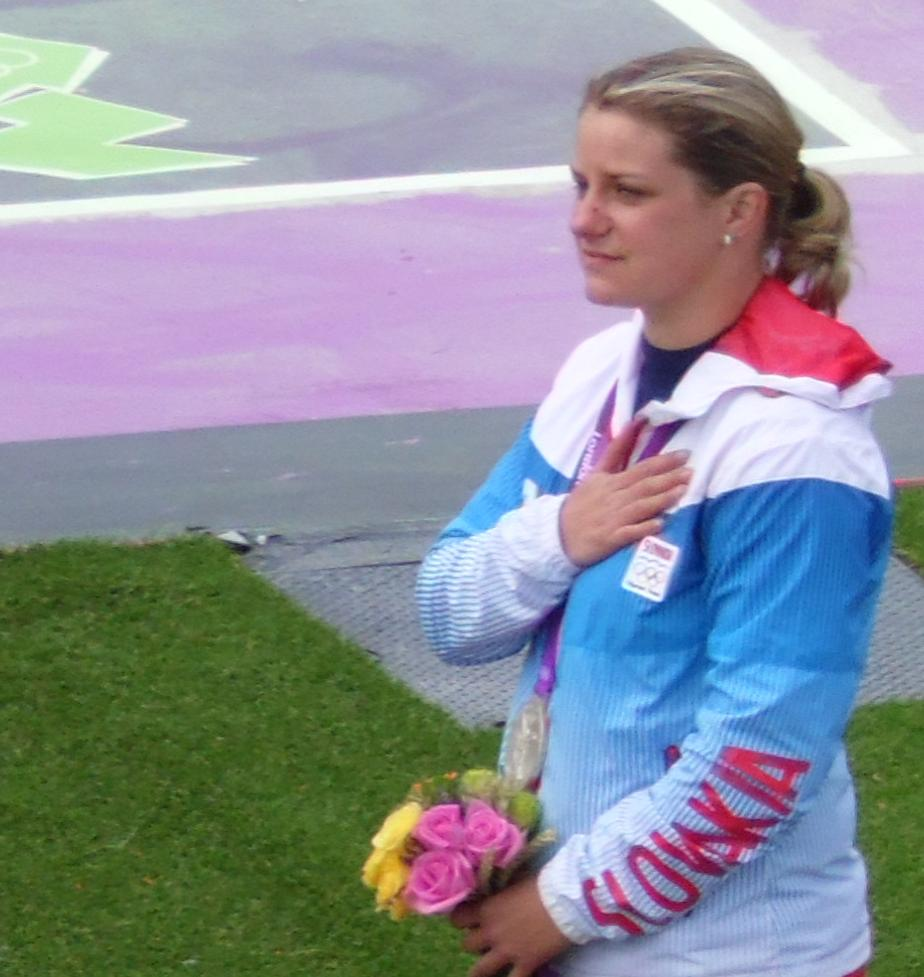
- Rehák-Štefečeková in 2012

Personal information
- Nationality: Slovak
- Born: 15 January 1984 (age 42) Nitra, Czechoslovakia
- Height: 1.66 m (5 ft 5 in)
- Weight: 75 kg (165 lb)

Sport
- Country: Slovakia
- Sport: Shooting
- Event: Trap
- Club: SCP Bratislava
Medal record
Women's shooting
Representing Slovakia
Olympic Games
| Gold medal – first place | 2020 Tokyo | Trap |
| Silver medal – second place | 2008 Beijing | Trap |
| Silver medal – second place | 2012 London | Trap |
World Championships
| Gold medal – first place | 2010 Munich | Trap |
| Gold medal – first place | 2018 Changwon | Trap |
| Gold medal – first place | 2018 Changwon | Trap mixed team |
| Silver medal – second place | 2011 Belgrade | Trap |
| Bronze medal – third place | 2003 Nicosia | Trap |
| Bronze medal – third place | 2017 Moscow | Trap |
| Bronze medal – third place | 2022 Osijek | Trap |
European Games
| Gold medal – first place | 2015 Baku | Trap mixed team |
European Championships
| Gold medal – first place | 2015 Maribor | Trap |
| Gold medal – first place | 2016 Lonato | Trap |
| Gold medal – first place | 2018 Leobersdorf | Double trap mixed team |
| Silver medal – second place | 2008 Nicosia | Trap |
| Silver medal – second place | 2010 Kazan | Trap |
| Silver medal – second place | 2013 Suhl | Trap |
| Silver medal – second place | 2015 Maribor | Trap team |
| Silver medal – second place | 2018 Leobersdorf | Trap mixed team |
| Silver medal – second place | 2018 Leobersdorf | Double trap |
| Silver medal – second place | 2023 Osijek | Trap mixed team |
| Silver medal – second place | 2023 Osijek | Trap team |
| Silver medal – second place | 2025 Chateauroux | Trap |
| Bronze medal – third place | 2006 Maribor | Trap |
| Bronze medal – third place | 2013 Suhl | Trap team |
| Bronze medal – third place | 2014 Sarlóspuszta | Trap |
| Bronze medal – third place | 2017 Baku | Trap team |
| Bronze medal – third place | 2018 Leobersdorf | Trap |
Universiade
| Gold medal – first place | 2007 Bangkok | Trap |
| Bronze medal – third place | 2007 Bangkok | Double trap |

Zuzana Rehák-Štefečeková (born 15 January 1984) is a Slovak sports shooter. She won the gold medal in the Women's Trap event at the 2020 Summer Olympics and the silver medal at the 2008 and 2012 Summer Olympics.

== Career ==
Her first big successes were bronze medals from 2002 World and European Junior Championships. She also placed fourth at the 2001 World Junior Championships and fifth at the 1999 World Junior Championship. As a junior, she also competed in double trap, her best results were the 6th place from the 2001 World Junior Championships and 7th place from the 1999 World Junior Championship.

=== Olympic Games ===
She entered the 2008 Summer Olympics as a holder of the qualification (74 hits) and final (96) world records which she achieved in 2006 at the World Cup event in Qingyuan. She won the qualification round, but placed second in the final, where she missed two more targets than Satu Mäkelä-Nummela of Finland. Her world records lasted to the 2012 Summer Olympics, where they were overcome by Jessica Rossi of Italy, who missed only one target in the whole competition. Štefečeková was the most successful in the silver medal shoot-off, beating Delphine Réau of France and Alessandra Perilli of San Marino. She is the first sports shooter who managed to defend her medal in the women's trap competition at the Olympic Games. Despite qualifying for the 2016 Summer Olympics, she did not compete due her maternity leave.

Rehák-Štefečeková competed in two events at the 2020 Summer Olympics, women's trap (individual) and mixed trap team with Erik Varga. She won the qualification in the individual trap event, setting the new world and Olympic record by hitting all 125 targets. She won the gold medal in the finals, the first ever gold medal for Slovakia from shooting events. Rehák-Štefečeková managed to hit 43 of 50 targets, one more than the silver medalist Kayle Browning. She thus became the most successful shooter in Olympic women's trap, with one gold and two silver medals (no other Olympic champion has ever managed to win another medal in this event). In the mixed trap team event she and Erik Varga placed third in the qualification, missing only one target out of 75, while Varga missed three. They advanced into the bronze medal match, where they managed hit the equal number of targets (42) as Madelynn Bernau and Brian Burrows from the USA, but ultimately lost in the subsequent shoot-off, finishing fourth.

=== World and European Championships ===
Competing at the senior level, Štefečeková won her first medal at the 2003 World Championships, where she finished third. After placing 10th in 2006, 9th in 2007 and 6th in 2009, she won the gold medal at the 2010 World Championships, with 72 hits in qualification and 19 in final, beating Liu Yingzi and Jessica Rossi. She added a silver medal in 2011, where only Liu Yingzi defeated her and a bronze medal in 2017. Her biggest success came at the 2018 World Championships, where she won the gold medal not only in the individual event, defeating Wang Xiaojing in the final shoot-off, but also in the mixed trap with Erik Varga.

Her total score from the European Championships in the single-target individual trap event is two gold (2015 and 2016), three silver (2008, 2010 and 2013) and three bronze (2006, 2014 and 2018) medals. She also won the silver medal in the individual double trap event at the 2018 European Championships and five medals in team events: gold in 2018 (mixed double trap with Hubert Andrzej Olejnik), silver in 2015 (women's trap team) and 2018 (mixed trap with Erik Varga) and bronze in 2013 and 2017 (women's trap team).

=== Other competitions ===
At the first European Games, with Erik Varga, they won a gold medal in the mixed trap event. She also won seven individual World Cup events, including two World Cup finals.

== Personal life ==
Štefečeková is a committed Christian, she studied missionary and charitable work in Bratislava. In 2016, she gave birth to a son, Nathan.

Awards and achievements
| Preceded by Peter Hochschorner/Pavol Hochschorner | Sportsperson of Slovakia; 2012 | Succeeded by Peter Sagan |
Olympic Games
| Preceded by Danka Barteková | Flagbearer for Slovakia; Tokyo 2020 together with Matej Beňuš | Succeeded by Incumbent |
