= Fátima Gálvez =

Spanish sport shooter (born 1987)

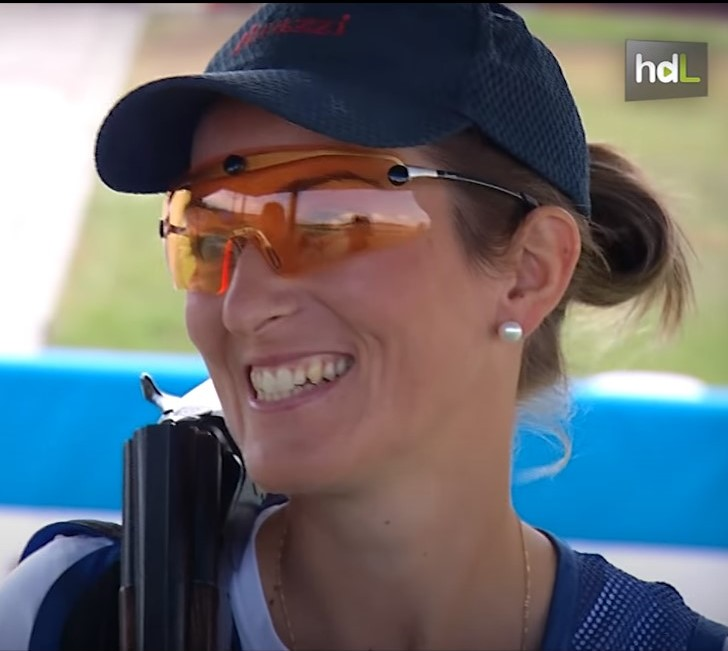
- Gálvez in 2014

Personal information
- Full name: Fátima Gálvez Marín
- Nationality: Spanish
- Born: 19 January 1987 (age 39) Baena, Córdoba, Spain
- Height: 1.66 m (5 ft 5 in)
- Weight: 55 kg (121 lb)

Sport
- Sport: Shooting
- Events: Trap, double trap
- Coached by: Jose Luis Perez Sanz
Medal record
Women's shooting
Representing Spain
Olympic Games
Gold medal – first place	2020 Tokyo	Mixed team trap
World Championships
Gold medal – first place	2015 Lonato	Trap
Silver medal – second place	2014 Granada	Trap
Silver medal – second place	2018 Changwon	Team trap
Silver medal – second place	2022 Osijek	Trap
Bronze medal – third place	2014 Granada	Team trap
Bronze medal – third place	2019 Lonato	Trap
European Games
Gold medal – first place	2015 Baku	Trap
Gold medal – first place	2019 Minsk	Mixed team trap
Bronze medal – third place	2019 Minsk	Trap
European Championships
Gold medal – first place	2011 Belgrade	Trap
Gold medal – first place	2019 Lonato	Mixed team trap
Gold medal – first place	2024 Lonato	Trap
Gold medal – first place	2026 Athens	Trap
Silver medal – second place	2012 Larnaca	Team trap
Silver medal – second place	2019 Lonato	Team trap
Silver medal – second place	2025 Chateauroux	Trap Team
Silver medal – second place	2026 Athens	Team Trap
Bronze medal – third place	2010 Kazan	Team trap
Bronze medal – third place	2016 Lonato	Trap
Bronze medal – third place	2016 Lonato	Team trap
Bronze medal – third place	2021 Osijek	Mixed team trap
Bronze medal – third place	2023 Osijek	Trap
Bronze medal – third place	2025 Chateauroux	Trap

Fátima Gálvez Marín (Note: In this Spanish name, the first or paternal surname is Gálvez and the second or maternal family name is Marín.) (born 19 January 1987) is a Spanish sport shooter. She was the World champion in the individual trap event at the 2015 World Shotgun Championships, and won the Olympic champion in the team event at the 2020 Summer Olympics.

Gálvez won a silver medal in the women's trap at the first meet of the 2011 ISSF Shotgun World Cup series in Concepcion, Chile, with a score of 91 clay pigeons, earning her first Olympic participation.

Gálvez represented Spain at the 2012 Summer Olympics in London, where she competed in the women's trap. Gálvez barely advanced to the final, after scoring a total of 70 targets from the qualifying rounds, and winning a three-person shoot-off against Finland's Satu Mäkelä-Nummela and Russia's Elena Tkach, with a bonus of 12 points. She finished in fifth place, twelve points behind winner and world-record holder Jessica Rossi of Italy, accumulating a score of 87 targets (17 in the final).

At the 2016 Summer Olympics in Rio de Janeiro, Gálvez advanced to the bronze medal match in the women's trap but lost to in the shoot-off to United States' Corey Cogdell.

At the 2020 Summer Olympics in Tokyo, Gálvez did not advance to the final in the individual event, finishing 14th. In the mixed trap team, Gálvez won the gold medal together with Alberto Fernández by winning the shoot-off in the final against San Marino's Alessandra Perilli and Gian Marco Berti.
