= San Marino at the 2019 European Games =

- IOC code: SMR
- NOC: Sammarinese National Olympic Committee
- Website: www.cons.sm

in Minsk, Belarus 21–30 June
- Competitors: 4 in 3 sports
- Medals Ranked 43rd: Gold 0 Silver 0 Bronze 1 Total 1

European Games appearances (overview)
- 2015; 2019; 2023; 2027

San Marino competed at the 2019 European Games in Minsk from 21 to 30 June 2019. San Marino was represented by 4 athletes in 3 sports.

== Competitors ==
Sport	Men	Women	Total
Archery	1	0	1
Shooting	1	1	2
Wrestling	1	0	1
Total	3	1	4

== Medalists ==
Medal	Name	Sport	Event	Date
Bronze	Myles Amine	Wrestling	Men's freestyle 86 kg	26 June

== Archery ==
Recurve

Athlete	Event	Ranking round		Round of 64	Round of 32	Round of 16	Quarterfinals	Semifinals	Final / BM	
Athlete	Event	Score	Seed	Opposition Score	Opposition Score	Opposition Score	Opposition Score	Opposition Score	Opposition Score	Rank
Jacopo Forlani	Men's individual	621	43	Ebermann (CZE); W 6–4	Huston (GBR); L 2–6	Did not advance				

== Shooting ==
Men

Athlete	Event	Qualification		Final	
Athlete	Event	Points	Rank	Points	Rank
Gian Marco Berti	Trap	103	30	Did not advance	

Women

Athlete	Event	Qualification		Final	
Athlete	Event	Points	Rank	Points	Rank
Alessandra Perilli	Trap	101	19	Did not advance	

Mixed team

Athlete	Event	Qualification		Final / BM	
Athlete	Event	Points	Rank	Opposition Result	Rank
Gian Marco Berti; Alessandra Perilli	Trap	115	22	Did not advance	

== Wrestling ==
Men's Freestyle

Athlete	Event	Round of 16	Quarterfinal	Semifinal	Repechage	Final / BM	
Athlete	Event	Opposition Result	Opposition Result	Opposition Result	Opposition Result	Opposition Result	Rank
Myles Amine	−86 kg	Bye	Kurugliev (RUS); L 0–6	Did not advance	Baranowski (POL); W 4–3	Gostiyev (AZE); W 3–3	3rd place, bronze medalist(s)
