= Danka Barteková =

Slovak sport shooter (born 1984)

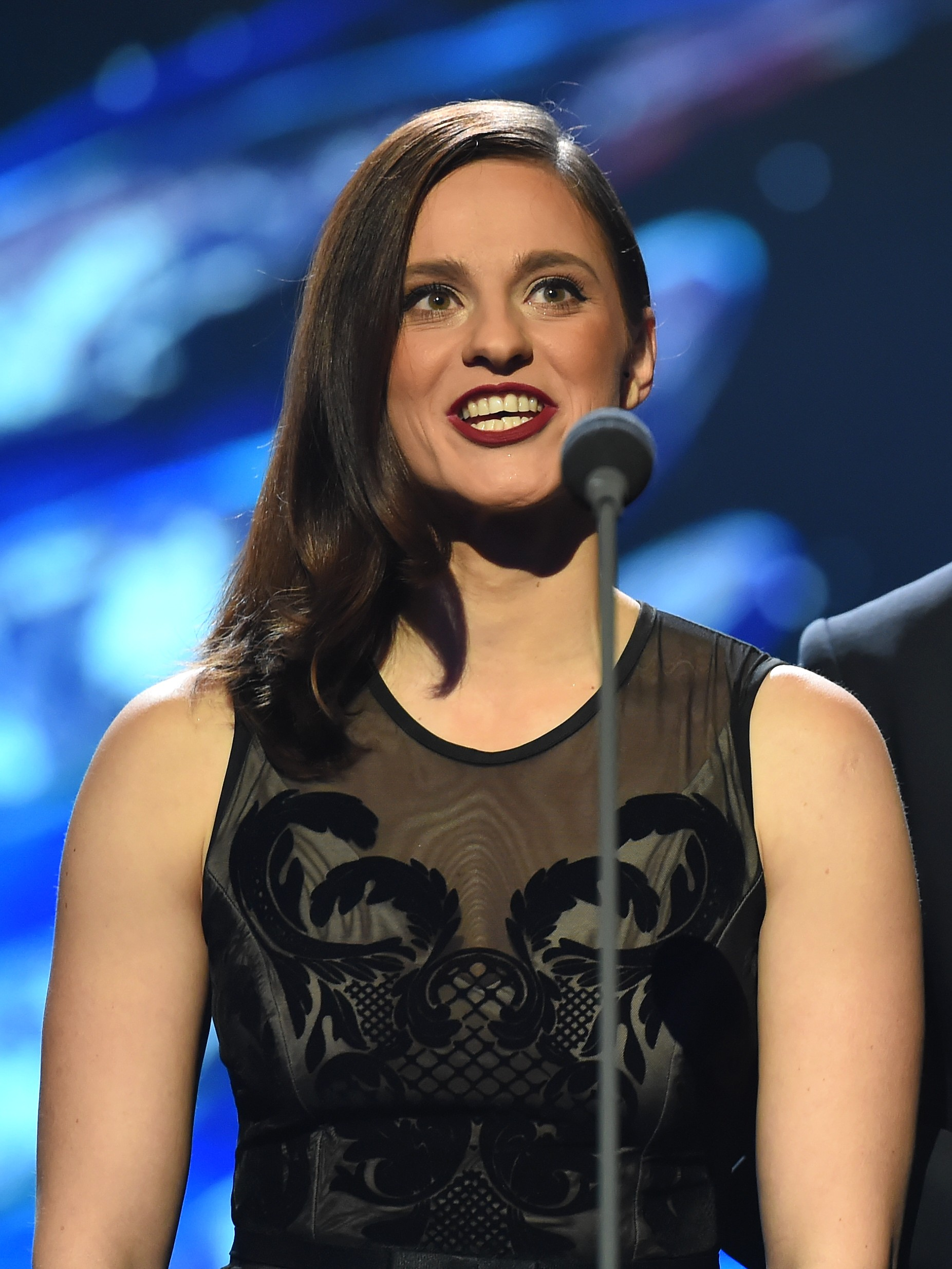
- Barteková in 2016

Personal information
- Nationality: Slovak
- Born: 19 October 1984 (age 41) Trenčín, Czechoslovakia
- Education: Matej Bel University
- Height: 170 cm (5 ft 7 in)
- Weight: 55 kg (121 lb)
- Website: dankabartekova.com

Sport
- Country: Slovakia
- Sport: Shooting
- Event: Skeet
Medal record
Women's shooting
Representing Slovakia
Olympic Games
Bronze medal – third place	2012 London	Skeet
World Championships
Gold medal – first place	2023 Baku	Skeet
Silver medal – second place	2005 Lonato	Skeet team
Silver medal – second place	2014 Granada	Skeet team
Bronze medal – third place	2005 Lonato	Skeet
Bronze medal – third place	2006 Zagreb	Skeet
Bronze medal – third place	2009 Maribor	Skeet team
Bronze medal – third place	2010 Munich	Skeet
Bronze medal – third place	2010 Munich	Skeet team
Bronze medal – third place	2011 Belgrade	Skeet team
Bronze medal – third place	2014 Granada	Skeet
Bronze medal – third place	2023 Baku	Skeet team
European Games
Silver medal – second place	2023 Kraków-Małopolska	Skeet team
European Championships
Gold medal – first place	2006 Maribor	Skeet team
Gold medal – first place	2008 Nicosia	Skeet
Gold medal – first place	2008 Nicosia	Skeet team
Gold medal – first place	2010 Kazan	Skeet
Gold medal – first place	2010 Kazan	Skeet team
Gold medal – first place	2014 Sarlóspuszta	Skeet team
Gold medal – first place	2015 Maribor	Skeet team
Gold medal – first place	2018 Leobersdorf	Skeet
Gold medal – first place	2018 Leobersdorf	Skeet team
Gold medal – first place	2023 Osijek	Skeet
Gold medal – first place	2024 Lonato	Skeet team
Silver medal – second place	2011 Belgrade	Skeet team
Silver medal – second place	2015 Maribor	Skeet
Bronze medal – third place	2007 Granada	Skeet team
Bronze medal – third place	2013 Suhl	Skeet
Bronze medal – third place	2013 Suhl	Skeet team
Bronze medal – third place	2014 Sarlóspuszta	Skeet
Bronze medal – third place	2016 Lonato	Skeet team
Universiade
Silver medal – second place	2011 Shenzhen	Skeet

Danka Hrbeková (née Barteková, born 19 October 1984) is a Slovak skeet shooter. She has won many medals from ISSF World, European Championships and ISSF World Cups. Barteková finished 8th at Women's Skeet event at the 2008 Summer Olympics and won the bronze medal in Women's Skeet at the 2012 Summer Olympics. She also competed in the 2016 Summer Olympics. Barteková is a 14-time gold medalist in the Slovak Championship since 1999.

In 2012, she was elected to the IOC Athletes' Commission. Barteková served as an IOC member from 2012 to 2021, and was also vice-chair of the IOC Athletes' Commission from 2018 to 2021. In February 2022 she was elected to serve an eight-year term as a member of the International Olympic Committee.

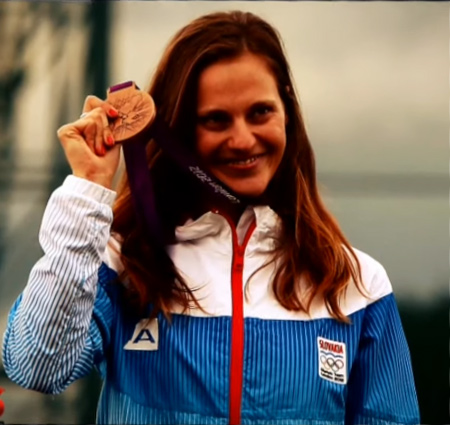
Danka Barteková with the 2012 Olympics bronze

== Achievements ==
- Won a bronze medal at the 2012 London Olympics
- In the ISSF World Shooting Championships, Danka earned one silver medal in the SK75 event in 2001 and five bronze medals in SK75 event in 2003, 2005, 2006, 2010 and 2014.
- Bagged four gold medals (2006, 2009, 2012, 2014), three silver medals (2008, 2008, 2012) and three bronze medals (2006, 2011, 2020, 2021) at the ISSF World Cup
- Secured a silver medal at the 2011 Universiade
- Won a gold medal in SK75 event at the 2012 ISSF World Cup Final
- Claimed six gold medals in SK75 & SK125W event at the European Championships in the years 2002, 2004, 2008, 2010, 2018 and 2019
- Also added one silver medal in 2015 and two bronze medals under her belt at the European Championships in 2013 and 2014

Olympic Games
Preceded by Jozef Gönci	Flagbearer for Slovakia; Rio de Janeiro 2016	Succeeded by Matej Beňuš; Zuzana Rehák-Štefečeková
