= Wrestling at the 2019 European Games – Men's freestyle 86 kg =

Men's freestyle 86 kg at the 2019 European Games
- Venue: Minsk Sports Palace
- Date: 25 June and 26 June
- Competitors: 15 from 15 nations

Medalists
| gold medal | Dauren Kurugliev | Russia |
| silver medal | Ali Shabanau | Belarus |
| bronze medal | Ahmed Dudarov | Germany |
| bronze medal | Myles Amine | San Marino |

The men's freestyle 86 kilograms wrestling competition at the 2019 European Games in Minsk was held on 25 to 26 June 2019 at the Minsk Sports Palace.

== Schedule ==
All times are in FET (UTC+03:00)

| Date | Time | Event |
|---|---|---|
| Tuesday, 25 June 2019 | 11:50 | 1/8 finals |
| Tuesday, 25 June 2019 | 13:10 | Quarterfinals |
| Tuesday, 25 June 2019 | 18:40 | Semifinals |
| Wednesday, 26 June 2019 | 11:10 | Repechage |
| Wednesday, 26 June 2019 | 19:30 | Finals |

== Results ==
Legend

- F — Won by fall
- R — Retired

=== Main bracket ===
1/8 finals
Ali Shabanau (BLR) | 5
Uri Kalashnikov (ISR) | 2
Georgios Savvoulidis (GRE) | 0
Ahmed Dudarov (GER) | 10
Taimuraz Friev (ESP) | 10
Mihai Palaghia (ROU) | 0
Denis Balaur (MDA) | 1^{R}
Alexander Gostiyev (AZE) | 7
Stefan Reichmuth (SUI) | 2
Sandro Aminashvili (GEO) | 3
Myles Amine (SMR) | 0
Dauren Kurugliev (RUS) | 6
Zbigniew Baranowski (POL) | 11
Svetoslav Dimitrov (BUL) | 0

Quarterfinals
Fatih Erdin (TUR) | 3
Ali Shabanau (BLR) | 4
Ahmed Dudarov (GER) | 8
Taimuraz Friev (ESP) | 2
Alexander Gostiyev (AZE) | 6
Sandro Aminashvili (GEO) | 2
Dauren Kurugliev (RUS) | 4
Zbigniew Baranowski (POL) | 3

Semifinals
Ali Shabanau (BLR) | 3
Ahmed Dudarov (GER) | 0
Alexander Gostiyev (AZE) | 3
Dauren Kurugliev (RUS) | 6

Final
Ali Shabanau (BLR) | 2
Dauren Kurugliev (RUS) | 3

=== Repechage ===
Repechage round 1
Uri Kalashnikov (ISR) | 0
Fatih Erdin (TUR) | 12
Myles Amine (SMR) | 4
Zbigniew Baranowski (POL) | 3

Bronze medals
Fatih Erdin (TUR) | 8
Ahmed Dudarov (GER) | 10
Myles Amine (SMR) | 3
Alexander Gostiyev (AZE) | 3
