= Elena Tkach =

Russian sports shooter (born 1970)

Personal information
- Full name: Yelena Anatolyevna Tkach
- Nationality: Russia
- Born: 19 May 1970 (age 56) Kopeysk, Chelyabinsk, Russian SFSR
- Height: 1.70 m (5 ft 7 in)
- Weight: 64 kg (141 lb)

Sport
- Sport: Shooting
- Events: Trap, double trap
- Club: Dynamo Voronezh
- Coached by: Maxim Kosarev
Medal record
Women's shooting
European Games
Silver medal – second place	2015 Baku	Mixed Trap
Bronze medal – third place	2015 Baku	Trap
World Championships
Representing Soviet Union
Silver medal – second place	1991 Perth	Double trap
Representing Russia
ISSF World Championships
Gold medal – first place	2002 Lahti	Trap
Bronze medal – third place	2011 Belgrade	Trap
Bronze medal – third place	2013 Lima	Trap

Yelena Anatolyevna Tkach (also Elena Tkach, Russian: Елена Анатольевна Ткач; born 19 May 1970 in Kopeysk, Russian SSR, Soviet Union) is a Russian sport shooter. Representing the former Soviet Union, Tkach won a silver medal in the women's double trap at the 1991 ISSF World Shooting Championships in Perth, Australia, with a total score of 121 clay pigeons. She also defeated Lithuania's Daina Gudzinevičiūtė by one point for the gold medal in the women's trap at the 2002 ISSF World Shooting Championships in Lahti, Finland, accumulating a score of 93 targets. Tkach is also a member of the shooting team for Dynamo Voronezh, and is coached and trained by her teammate and two-time Olympian Maxim Kosarev.

Tkach made her official debut for the 2000 Summer Olympics in Sydney, where she competed only in two shooting events. She scored a total of 81 clay pigeons 65 in the preliminary rounds and 16 in the final) in the women's trap by five points behind German shooter and Olympic silver medalist Susanne Kiermayer, finishing only in sixth place. The following day, Tkach placed sixteenth in the qualifying rounds of the women's double trap by three points behind Canada's Susan Nattrass, accumulating a score of 90 targets.

Twelve years after competing in her last Olympics, Tkach qualified for her second Russian team, as a 42-year-old, at the 2012 Summer Olympics in London, by placing second in the women's trap from the 2011 European Shooting Championships in Belgrade, Serbia. Tkach had finished on exactly the same score of 70 targets as Finland's Satu Mäkelä-Nummela (defending Olympic champion) and Spain's Fátima Gálvez in the qualifying rounds of the women's trap, but narrowly lost the three-person shoot-off by half the score behind winner Gálvez, for a bonus of six points.
