= Aleksey Alipov =

Russian sport shooter

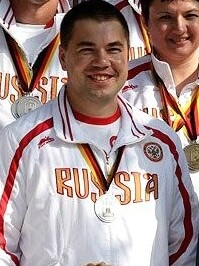
- Aleksey Alipov (2010)

Personal information
- Full name: Aleksey Aleksandrovich Alipov
- Nationality: (Russia) Russian
- Born: 7 August 1975 (age 50) Moscow, Russian SfSR, Soviet Union (now Russia)
- Height: 1.76 m (5 ft 9 in)
- Weight: 85 kg (187 lb)

Sport
- Country: Russia
- Sport: Shooting
- Event: Trap shooting
- Club: CSKA Moscow
Medal record
Men's shooting
Representing Russia
Olympic Games
Gold medal – first place	2004 Athens	Trap
Bronze medal – third place	2008 Beijing	Trap
World Championships
Silver medal – second place	2018 Changwon	Mixed Trap
Bronze medal – third place	2013 Lima	Trap
European Games
Gold medal – first place	2015 Baku	Trap
Silver medal – second place	2015 Baku	Mixed Trap
Bronze medal – third place	2019 Minsk	Mixed Trap
Military World Games
Silver medal – second place	2019 Wuhan	Trap
Bronze medal – third place	2019 Wuhan	Trap Team
Bronze medal – third place	2019 Wuhan	Mixed Trap

Aleksey Aleksandrovich Alipov (Russian: Алексей Александрович Алипов, born 7 August 1975) is a Russian olympic Trap shooter. He is the 2004 Olympic champion in that discipline.

== Career ==
Born in Moscow, he was trained at the Russian Academy of Sport. He participates for the Russian Army Sports Club, based in Moscow.

He competed at the 2000 Sydney Games where he finished ninth, but he achieved his ambition on 15 August 2004 at the Athens Olympics after a flawless final round in which he was on target with all 25 shots to finish with an overall score of 149 out of 150, beating Italy's Giovanni Pellielo into the silver medal position, while Australia's Adam Vella took bronze.

His hobbies include hunting and fishing, and he was in 2006 ranked eighth in the world in Trap by the International Shooting Sport Federation.

Olympic results
Event	2000	2004	2008	2012	2016	2020
Trap	9th 114	(gold) Gold; 124+25	(bronze) Bronze; 121+21	13th 120	7th 117	8th 122^{+10}
Double trap	14th 131	—	—	—	—	—
