= Elena Allen =

British sport shooter

Personal information
- Nationality: British
- Citizenship: United Kingdom and Russia
- Born: Elena Bogdanova; 12 July 1972 (age 54) Moscow, Soviet Union
- Spouse: (1) Chris Little (2) Malcolm Allen

Sport
- Country: Great Britain
- Sport: Skeet shooting
- Now coaching: Malcolm Allen

Achievements and titles
- Olympic finals: 2008: 13th 2012: 13th 2016: 13th
Medal record
Women's Shooting
Representing Great Britain
ISSF World Championships
Gold medal – first place	2014 Granada	Team Skeet
Silver medal – second place	2013 Lima	Team Skeet
Silver medal – second place	2014 Granada	Skeet
Bronze medal – third place	2013 Lima	Skeet
Bronze medal – third place	2002 Lahti	Skeet
Representing England
Commonwealth Games
Bronze medal – third place	2006 Melbourne	Skeet Pairs
Representing Wales
Commonwealth Games
Silver medal – second place	2014 Glasgow	Skeet
- Updated on 4 June 2016

Elena Allen (née Bogdanova; born 12 July 1972) is a British sport shooter. She represented Wales in the Commonwealth Games in 2014, winning the silver medal, having previously won bronze for England at the 2006 Games. She competed for Team GB at the 2008 and 2012 Olympics and has been chosen once more to compete at the 2016 Games.

== Early life ==
Elena Bogdanova was born in Moscow, Russia—then in the Soviet Union—on 12 July 1972. Her mother was Tatiana Bogdanova, who competed for the Soviet Union in shooting at European and World Championships, but did not compete at the Olympics. Elena has two sisters, Natasha and Maria, who are also shooters. She competed in the Soviet junior championships at the age of 18, placing third overall. In 1992, she moved to the United Kingdom where she married English international shooter Chris Little. She was later remarried to another fellow shooter Malcolm Allen. She attended the University of Bradford, where she earned a degree in modern languages.

== Shooting career ==
Allen won the bronze medal at the 2002 ISSF World Shooting Championships in Finland. In 2005, she set a world record for shooting which stood for seven years. She also won the gold medal at the World Cup event in Belgrade, Serbia, and a silver medal at the European Shooting Championships. Allen shot for England at the 2006 Commonwealth Games, winning the bronze medal in the Women's skeet shooting competition. Competing for Great Britain at the 2008 Summer Olympics in Beijing, China, she placed in 13th position overall. She won two bronze medals at World Cup events in Dorset, England, and in Italy in 2010.

In 2010 at the Commonwealth Championships held in New Delhi, she won Gold in the women's skeet event alongside her husband Malcolm Allen who also won Gold in the men's skeet event, the only time that a husband/wife had taken both titles.

At the 2012 Summer Olympics, she competed in the skeet event. Following three qualifying rounds, she finished in 13th place. She felt that the pressure of the home crowd did not help, being unfamiliar with enthusiastic crowds. She hoped that the experience would help her in the pursuit of medals at the 2016 Summer Olympics. In the 2013 World Shotgun Championships in Lima, Peru she received a bronze medal in the individual skeet competition.

In the 2014 Commonwealth Games in Glasgow, Allen took silver in the women's skeet. She had switched her allegiance to the Welsh team after qualifying for them through residency. At the World Championships during the same year, Allen placed second in the individual skeet event at the World Championships, being defeated to the gold medal by Brandy Drozd and a single target. This placing gave Great Britain a further place in the competition for the 2016 Summer Olympics in Rio de Janeiro, Brazil. The combined scores of Allen 73, Amber Hill 72 and Sarah Gray 68 won the team the overall gold medal in the competition.

Following that tournament, she was selected as part of the British team at the 2016 Olympics. At the Rio Olympics, she finished in 13th position following a breakdown in equipment.

Allen has been a member of the International Shooting Sports Federation (ISSF) athletes committee since 2017 and has been chairperson of the European Shooting Confederation (ESC) athletes committee since 2016

Her training regime includes walking, running and hill climbing.

== Personal life ==
She was originally married to Chris Little before her subsequent marriage to Malcolm Allen, who also acts as her coach. She lives in Abercarn, Caerphilly, Wales.
