= Adam Zavacký =

Slovak sprinter

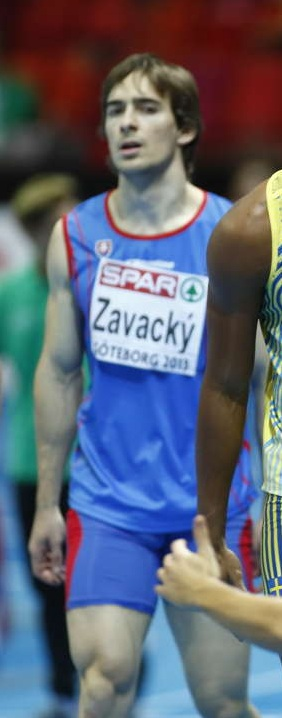
- Adam Zavacký at the 2013 European Indoor Championships

Personal information
- Nationality: Slovak
- Born: 27 June 1988 (age 38) Liptovsky Mikulas, Czechoslovakia

Sport
- Sport: Track and field
- Event: 100m
Medal record
Men's athletics
Representing Slovakia
Men's Athletics
European Games
| Gold medal – first place | 2015 Baku | Mixed team |

Adam Zavacký (born 27 June 1988) is a Slovak sprinter. He competed in the 100 metres event at the 2013 World Championships in Athletics.
