= Tatiana Barsuk =

Russian sport shooter

Personal information
- Nationality: Russian
- Born: 22 February 1985 (age 41)
- Height: 1.70 m (5 ft 7 in)
- Weight: 66 kg (146 lb)

Sport
- Country: Russia
- Sport: Shooting
Medal record
Women's shooting
Representing Russia
World Championships
Gold medal – first place	2011 Belgrade	Trap team
Silver medal – second place	2013 Lima	Trap team
Silver medal – second place	2019 Lonato del Garda	Trap team
Bronze medal – third place	2006 Zagreb	Trap team
Bronze medal – third place	2015 Lonato del Garda	Trap team
European Championships
Gold medal – first place	2017 Baku	Trap team
Universiade
Silver medal – second place	2013 Kazan	Trap team
Military World Games
Bronze medal – third place	2019 Wuhan	Trap team

Tatiana Valeryevna Barsuk (Russian: Татьяна Валерьевна Барсук; born 22 February 1985) is a Russian shooter. She represented her country at the 2016 Summer Olympics in the women's trap event, placing 18th out of 21 shooters, with 62 targets hit out of 75.
