= Katrin Quooß =

German sport shooter

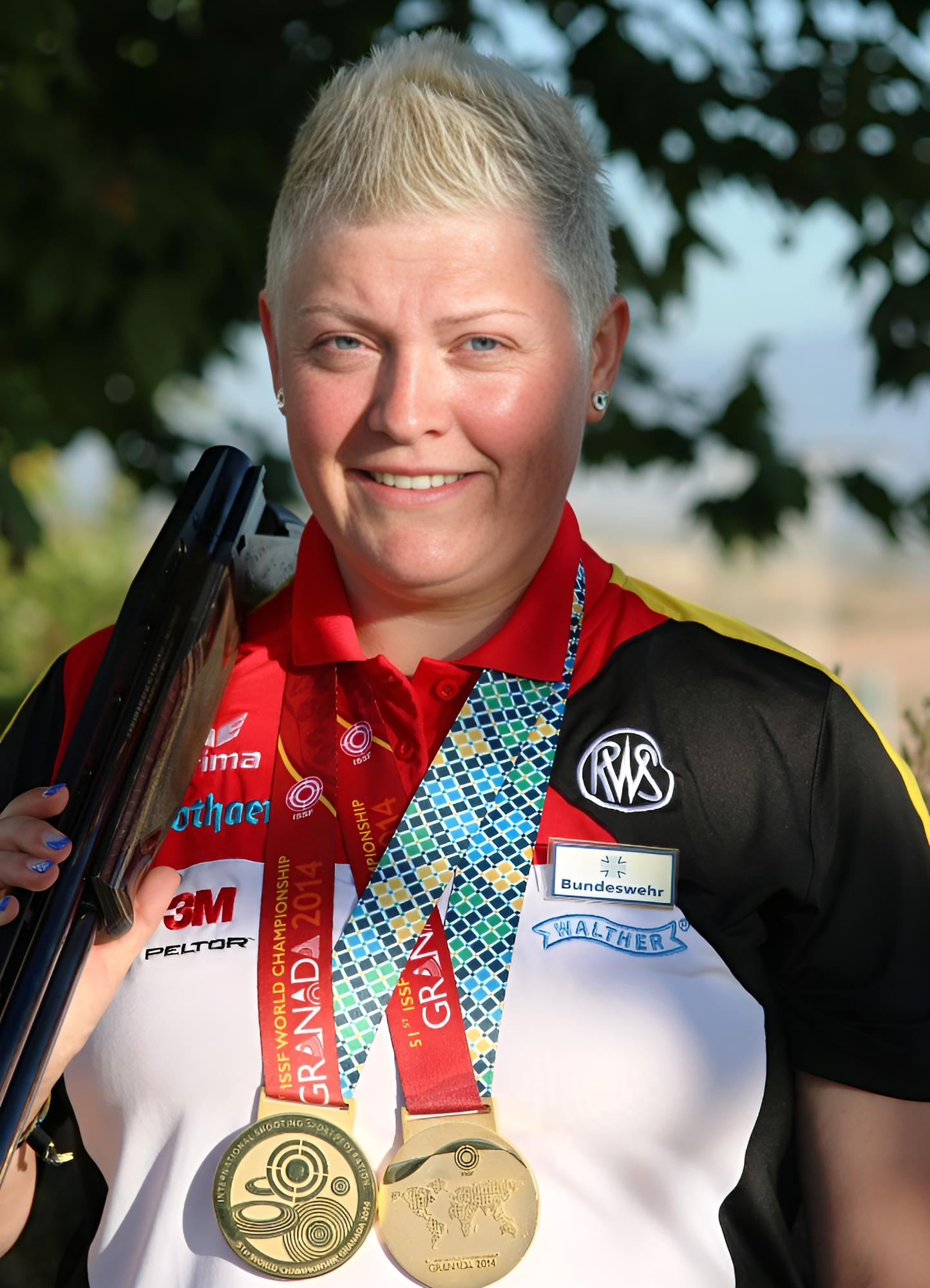
- Katrin Quooß at the 2014 World Championships in Granada

Personal information
- National team: Germany
- Born: October 23, 1986 (age 39) Kyritz
- Home town: Liebenthal, Heiligengrabe
- Occupation: Soldier
- Height: 170 cm (5 ft 7 in)

Sport
- Country: Germany
- Sport: Shooting Sports
- Event: Trap
- Club: PSG zu Wittstock Heiligendammer SGi
- Turned pro: 2003
- Coached by: Karsten Beth
- Retired: 2022
Medal record
Women's shooting
Representing Germany
World Championships
Gold medal – first place	2014 Granada	Trap
Gold medal – first place	2014 Granada	Trap Team
World Cup
Gold medal – first place	2019 Al Ain	Trap Mixed Team
Gold medal – first place	2018 Siggiewi	Trap
European Championships
Silver medal – second place	2014 Sarlóspuszta	Trap
Silver medal – second place	2014 Sarlóspuszta	Trap Team
Bronze medal – third place	2016 Lonato	Trap Mixed
Silver medal – second place	2018 Leobersdorf	Trap Team
World Military Games
Gold medal – first place	2015 Mungyeong	Trap

Katrin Quooß (born 26 April 1989) is a German sports shooter who became the World Champion at the 2014 ISSF World Shooting Championships in the Women's Trap event. She has been German Champion six times.

== Career ==
At the 2014 World Championships in Granada, Quooß won the Trap event to become World Champion. She also won the Team event with Jana Beckmann and Christiane Goehring.

In 2015, she competed at the CISM World Military Games in Mungyeong, South Korea where she won the Trap event.

In 2016, she became World Military Champion in Trap, winning the Trap event at the 49th CISM Shooting Championships in Doha.

During the Malta leg of the 2018 World Cup she won gold in the Women's Trap.
