= Boštjan Maček =

Slovenian sport shooter (born 1972)

Personal information
- Nationality: Slovenia
- Born: June 17, 1972 (age 54)

Sport
- Country: Slovenia
- Sport: Sport shooter
- Event: Skeet shooting
Medal record
Men's shooting
Representing Slovenia
World Championships
Bronze medal – third place	2022 Osijek	Team trap
European Championships
Gold medal – first place	2018 Leobersdorf	Trap
Bronze medal – third place	2009 Osijek	Team trap
Bronze medal – third place	2011 Belgrade	Trap
Bronze medal – third place	2015 Maribor	Trap
Bronze medal – third place	2024 Lonato	Trap

Boštjan Maček (born 17 June 1972 in Murska Sobota, SR Slovenia) is a sport shooter competing in trap. Maček represented Slovenia at the 2012 Summer Olympics in London, where he finished 7th in the qualification, with 121 rounds, thus missing the finals of best six.

Outside sports, Maček is employed as a truck driver at the Mlinotest bakery.
