= Hubert Olejnik =

Slovak sport shooter (born 1982)

Personal information
- Full name: Hubert Andrzej Olejnik
- Nationality: Slovak
- Born: 15 April 1982 (age 44) Wrocław, Poland
- Height: 1.86 m (6 ft 1 in)
- Weight: 100 kg (220 lb)

Sport
- Country: Slovakia
- Sport: Shooting
- Event: Double trap
- Club: Dukla Banská Bystrica
Medal record
Men's shooting
Representing Slovakia
World Championships
Silver medal – second place	2019 Lonato del Garda	Double trap
Bronze medal – third place	2018 Changwon	Double trap
ISSF World Cup
Gold medal – first place	2014 Munich	Double Trap
European Championships
Silver medal – second place	2017 Baku	Double trap
Bronze medal – third place	2018 Leobersdorf	Double trap
ISSF Grand Prix
Bronze medal – third place	2019 Lonato del Garda	Double trap team

Hubert Andrzej Olejnik (born 15 April 1982) is a Slovak sport shooter.

He participated at the 2018 ISSF World Shooting Championships, winning a medal.
