= Katarína Berešová =

Slovak long-distance runner

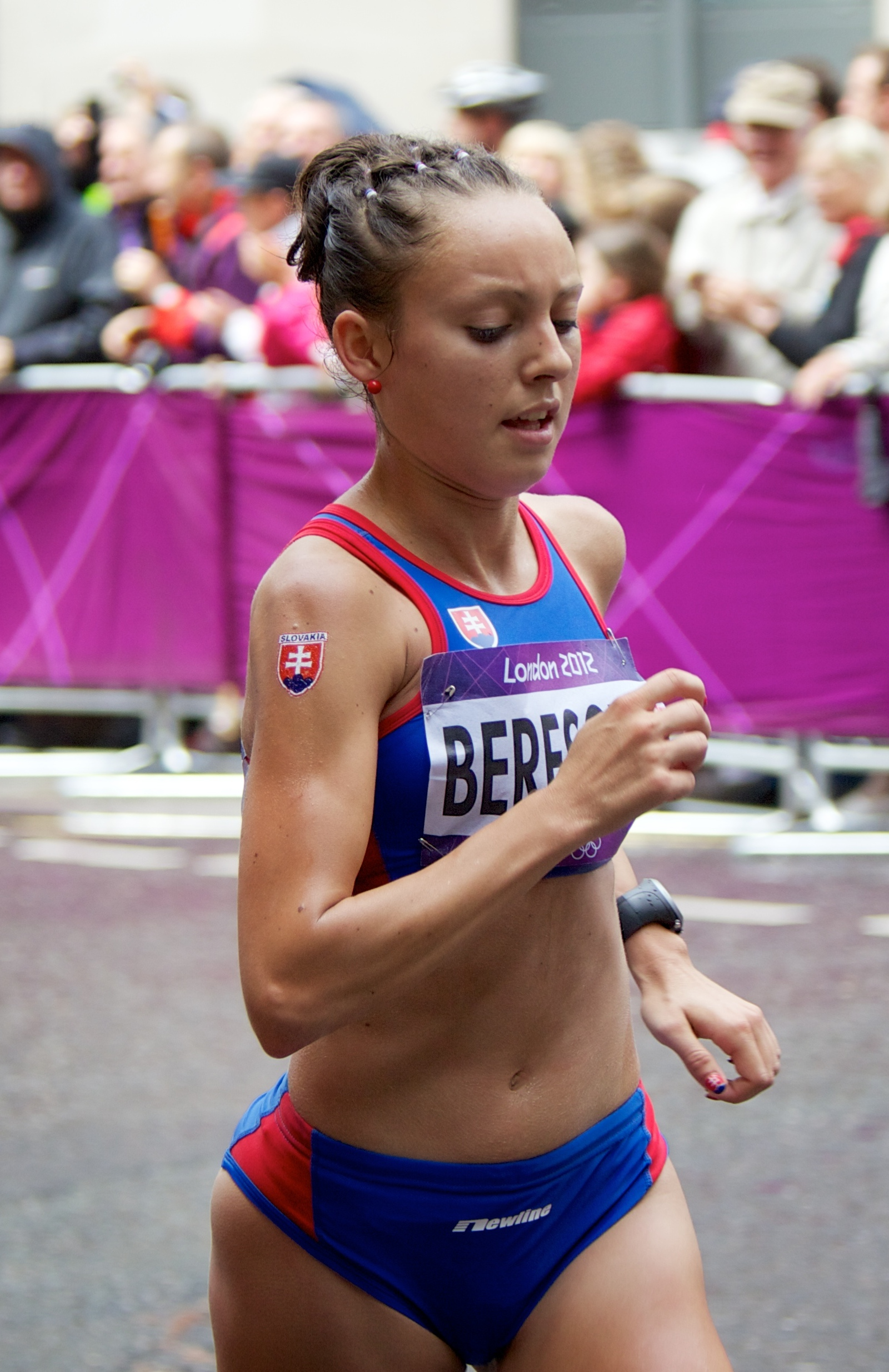
- Berešová in the 2012 Summer Olympics marathon

Personal information
- Born: October 10, 1987 (age 38) Trebišov, Slovakia
- Height: 1.63 m (5 ft 4 in)
- Weight: 47 kg (104 lb)

Sport
- Country: Slovakia
- Sport: Athletics
- Event: Marathon
Medal record
Women's Athletics
Representing Slovakia
European Games
Gold medal – first place	2015 Baku	Mixed team

Katarína Berešová-Pejpková (born 10 October 1987) is a Slovak long-distance runner. She competed in the marathon at the 2012 Summer Olympics, placing 99th with a time of 2:48:11. Later, she competed in the marathon at the 2016 Summer Olympics, standing 107th with a time of 2:50:54.
