= Pavol Kopp =

Slovak sport shooter

Personal information
- Born: 27 December 1978 (age 47)

Sport
- Country: Slovakia
- Sport: Shooting sports
Medal record
Representing Slovakia
Men's Shooting
European Games
Silver medal – second place	2015 Baku	Men's 50 metre pistol

Pavol Kopp is a Slovak sport shooter who competes in the men's 10 metre air pistol. At the 2008 Summer Olympics, he finished in 27th place in the men's 10 m air pistol, failing to make the final. In the 50 metre pistol, he reached the final, finishing 5th. At the 2012 Summer Olympics, he finished 21st in the qualifying round in the men's 10 m air pistol, failing to make the cut for the final. He also failed to make the final round in the 50 metre pistol, where he finished 20th.
