= 2013 World Shotgun Championships =

International sport shooting competition

The 2013 World Shotgun Championships were held in September 2013 in Lima, Peru. As in all odd-numbered years, separate ISSF World Shooting Championships were carried out in the trap, Double Trap and skeet events.

== Competition schedule ==
Date	Men, Junior Men	Women, Junior Women
Monday, 16 September	Skeet, day 1	Skeet, day 1
Tuesday, 17 September	Skeet, day 2	Skeet, day 2
Wednesday, 18 September	Skeet, day 3	
Thursday, 19 September		
Friday, 20 September	Double Trap	Double Trap
Saturday, 21 September		
Sunday, 22 September	Trap, day 1	Trap, day 1
Monday, 23 September	Trap, day 2	Trap, day 2
Tuesday, 24 September	Trap, day 3	

== Men ==
Individual			Teams			Juniors			Junior teams		
Trap
1st place, gold medalist(s)	Giovanni Pellielo (ITA)	121 + 13 + 13	1st place, gold medalist(s)	Spain	357	1st place, gold medalist(s)	Nicolás Pacheco (PER)	116	1st place, gold medalist(s)	Czech Republic	342
2nd place, silver medalist(s)	Anton Glasnovic (CRO)	121 + 12(2) + 11	2nd place, silver medalist(s)	Portugal	353	2nd place, silver medalist(s)	Pavel Vanek (CZE)	115(2)	2nd place, silver medalist(s)	Italy	332
3rd place, bronze medalist(s)	Alexey Alipov (RUS)	121 + 11(1) + 13	3rd place, bronze medalist(s)	Croatia	353	3rd place, bronze medalist(s)	Daniel Tarrant (GBR)	115(1)	3rd place, bronze medalist(s)	Russia	321
Double Trap
1st place, gold medalist(s)	Walton Eller (USA)	137 + 28 + 26	1st place, gold medalist(s)	United States	406	1st place, gold medalist(s)	Ian Rupert (USA)	133	1st place, gold medalist(s)	United States	382
2nd place, silver medalist(s)	Vasily Mosin (RUS)	134(4) + 27(4) + 25	2nd place, silver medalist(s)	China	404	2nd place, silver medalist(s)	Jacopo Trevisan (ITA)	132	2nd place, silver medalist(s)	Russia	377
3rd place, bronze medalist(s)	Hu Binyuan (CHN)	137 + 26(2) + 29	3rd place, bronze medalist(s)	Italy	393	3rd place, bronze medalist(s)	Kirill Fokeev (RUS)	130	3rd place, bronze medalist(s)	Italy	372
Skeet
1st place, gold medalist(s)	Jesper Hansen (DEN)	123 + 15(2) + 16	1st place, gold medalist(s)	Italy	365	1st place, gold medalist(s)	Domenico Simeone (ITA)	123	1st place, gold medalist(s)	Italy	362
2nd place, silver medalist(s)	Ennio Falco (ITA)	122(12) + 15(2) + 15	2nd place, silver medalist(s)	Czech Republic	362	2nd place, silver medalist(s)	Nicolás Pacheco (PER)	122	2nd place, silver medalist(s)	Czech Republic	347
3rd place, bronze medalist(s)	Henrik Jansson (SWE)	123+ 15(1) + 15	3rd place, bronze medalist(s)	Norway	362	3rd place, bronze medalist(s)	Tammaro Cassandro (ITA)	121	3rd place, bronze medalist(s)	United States	345

== Women ==
Individual			Teams			Juniors			Junior teams		
Trap
1st place, gold medalist(s)	Jessica Rossi (ITA)	70 + 12 + 12	1st place, gold medalist(s)	Italy	206	1st place, gold medalist(s)	Miranda Wilder (USA)	69	1st place, gold medalist(s)	Italy	190
2nd place, silver medalist(s)	Yukie Nakayama (JPN)	70 + 11(4) + 10	2nd place, silver medalist(s)	Russia	203	2nd place, silver medalist(s)	Svetlana Krasheninnikova (RUS)	64(1)	2nd place, silver medalist(s)	Russia	181
3rd place, bronze medalist(s)	Elena Tkach (RUS)	70 + 11(0) + 12	3rd place, bronze medalist(s)	Australia	202	3rd place, bronze medalist(s)	Alessia Iezzi (ITA)	64(0)	3rd place, bronze medalist(s)	United States	176
Skeet
1st place, gold medalist(s)	Christine Wenzel (GER)	74 + 16 + 15	1st place, gold medalist(s)	Italy	215	1st place, gold medalist(s)	Jitka Peskova (CZE)	67	1st place, gold medalist(s)	United States	184
2nd place, silver medalist(s)	Simona Scocchetti (ITA)	72(4) + 14 + 12	2nd place, silver medalist(s)	Great Britain	212	2nd place, silver medalist(s)	Dania Jo Vizzi (USA)	66	2nd place, silver medalist(s)	Russia	176
3rd place, bronze medalist(s)	Elena Allen (GBR)	72(4) +12(3) + 12	3rd place, bronze medalist(s)	Russia	207	3rd place, bronze medalist(s)	Chiara Di Marziantonio (ITA)	65	3rd place, bronze medalist(s)	Czech Republic	129

== Medal summary ==
=== Seniors ===
Rank	Nation	Gold	Silver	Bronze	Total
1	Italy	5	2	1	8
2	United States	2	0	0	2
3	Denmark	1	0	0	1
3	Germany	1	0	0	1
3	Spain	1	0	0	1
6	Russia	0	2	3	5
7	China	0	1	1	2
7	Croatia	0	1	1	2
7	Great Britain	0	1	1	2
10	Czech Republic	0	1	0	1
10	Japan	0	1	0	1
10	Portugal	0	1	0	1
13	Australia	0	0	1	1
13	Norway	0	0	1	1
13	Sweden	0	0	1	1
Totals (15 entries)		10	10	10	30

=== Juniors ===
Rank	Nation	Gold	Silver	Bronze	Total
1	United States	4	1	2	7
2	Italy	3	2	4	9
3	Czech Republic	2	2	1	5
4	Peru	1	1	0	2
5	Russia	0	4	2	6
6	Great Britain	0	0	1	1
Totals (6 entries)		10	10	10	30
