= Patrik Žeňúch =

Slovak javelin thrower

Personal information
- Born: 30 December 1990 (age 35)

Sport
- Country: Slovakia
- Sport: Track and field
- Event: javelin throw
Medal record
Men's athletics
Representing Slovakia
European Games
Gold medal – first place	2015 Baku	Mixed team
- Updated on 23 June 2021

Patrik Žeňúch (born 30 December 1990) is a male javelin thrower from Slovakia. He competed in the Men's javelin throw event at the 2015 World Championships in Athletics in Beijing, China.

== See also ==
- Slovakia at the 2015 World Championships in Athletics
