= Arianna Perilli =

Sammarinese professional target shooter (born 1978)

Personal information
- Born: May 1, 1978 (age 48) Rimini, Italy
- Height: 162 cm (5 ft 4 in)
- Weight: 70 kg (154 lb)

Sport
- Sport: Trap
- Team: San Marino
Medal record
Representing San Marino
European Championships
| Gold medal – first place | 2005 Belgrade | Trap |
| Gold medal – first place | 2006 Maribor | Trap |
| Bronze medal – third place | 1997 Sipoo | Double Trap |
European Games
| Silver medal – second place | 2015 Baku | Trap |

Arianna Perilli (born 1978 in Rimini) is a Sammarinese professional target shooter.

Olympic Games
| Preceded by Alessandra Perilli | Flagbearer for San Marino; 2016 Rio de Janeiro | Succeeded by Arianna Valloni & Myles Amine |
