= Marián Kovačócy =

Slovak sports shooter (born 1984)

Personal information
- Nationality: Slovak
- Born: 17 September 1984 (age 41) Trnava, Czechoslovakia
- Height: 180 cm (5 ft 11 in)
- Weight: 90 kg (198 lb)

Sport
- Country: Slovakia
- Sport: Sports shooting
- Event: Trap
- Club: SCP Bratislava
- Coached by: Branislav Slamka
Medal record
Men's shooting
Representing Slovakia
World Championships
| Gold medal – first place | 2009 Maribor | Trap |
| Silver medal – second place | 2023 Baku | Trap |
ISSF World Cup
| Bronze medal – third place | 2018 Siggiewi | Trap |
European Games
| Silver medal – second place | 2023 Kraków-Małopolska | Trap team |
European Championships
| Gold medal – first place | 2015 Maribor | Trap team |
| Gold medal – first place | 2021 Osijek | Trap team |
| Silver medal – second place | 2013 Suhl | Trap team |

Marián Kovačócy (born 17 September 1984) is a Slovak sports shooter. He competed in the men's trap event at the 2016 Summer Olympics.
