= Erik Varga =

Slovak sport shooter (born 1976)

Personal information
- Nationality: Slovak
- Born: 9 June 1976 (age 50) Šaľa, Czechoslovakia
- Height: 1.84 m (6 ft 0 in)
- Weight: 90 kg (198 lb)

Sport
- Country: Slovakia
- Sport: Shooting
- Event: Trap
- Club: SCP Bratislava
Medal record
Men's shooting
Representing Slovakia
World Championships
Gold medal – first place	2014 Granada	Trap
Gold medal – first place	2015 Lonato	Trap
Gold medal – first place	2018 Changwon	Trap mixed team
Silver medal – second place	2009 Maribor	Trap team
Silver medal – second place	2018 Changwon	Trap
European Games
Gold medal – first place	2015 Baku	Trap mixed team
Silver medal – second place	2015 Baku	Trap
Silver medal – second place	2023 Kraków-Małopolska	Team trap
European Championships
Gold medal – first place	2011 Belgrade	Trap
Gold medal – first place	2015 Maribor	Trap team
Gold medal – first place	2021 Osijek	Trap team
Silver medal – second place	2013 Suhl	Trap team
Silver medal – second place	2018 Leobersdorf	Trap mixed team
Silver medal – second place	2023 Osijek	Trap mixed team
Silver medal – second place	2026 Athens	Trap

Erik Varga (Hungarian: Varga Erik; born 9 June 1976) is a Slovak sport shooter who specializes in the trap. He is a member of the Hungarian community in Slovakia.

At the 2008 Olympic Games he finished in joint eighth place in the trap qualification, missing a place among the top six, who progressed to the final round.

At the 2012 Olympic Games he finished in twelfth place in the trap.
