= 2009 World Shotgun Championships =

Shooting competition

The 2009 World Shotgun Championships were held in August 2009 in Maribor, Slovenia. As in all odd-numbered years, separate ISSF World Shooting Championships were carried out in the trap, double trap and skeet events.

== Medal count ==
Rank	Nation	Gold	Silver	Bronze	Total
1	Italy (ITA)	6	4	5	15
2	United States (USA)	4	5	1	10
3	Russia (RUS)	3	2	1	6
4	China (CHN)	2	1	1	4
5	Czech Republic (CZE)	2	0	1	3
6	Slovakia (SVK)	1	1	1	3
6	Sweden (SWE)	1	1	1	3
8	Germany (GER)	1	0	1	2
9	Spain (ESP)	0	2	0	2
10	Great Britain (GBR)	0	1	2	3
11	Finland (FIN)	0	1	1	2
12	Cyprus (CYP)	0	1	0	1
12	Thailand (THA)	0	1	0	1
14	Denmark (DEN)	0	0	1	1
14	Poland (POL)	0	0	1	1
14	Portugal (POR)	0	0	1	1
14	San Marino (SMR)	0	0	1	1
14	Turkey (TUR)	0	0	1	1
Totals (18 entries)		20	20	20	60

== Men ==
Individual			Teams			Juniors			Junior teams		
Trap
1st place, gold medalist(s)	Marian Kovacocy (SVK)	146 (122)	1st place, gold medalist(s)	Italy	362	1st place, gold medalist(s)	Valerio Grazini (ITA)	122	1st place, gold medalist(s)	Italy	354
2nd place, silver medalist(s)	Massimo Fabbrizi (ITA)	145+1 (123)	2nd place, silver medalist(s)	Slovakia	361	2nd place, silver medalist(s)	Paco Machado (ESP)	121	2nd place, silver medalist(s)	United States	347
3rd place, bronze medalist(s)	Oguzhan Tuzun (TUR)	145+0 (123)	3rd place, bronze medalist(s)	Czech Republic	361	3rd place, bronze medalist(s)	Daniel Wiesemann (GER)	120	3rd place, bronze medalist(s)	Portugal	346
Double trap
1st place, gold medalist(s)	Francesco D'Aniello (ITA)	190 (146)	1st place, gold medalist(s)	United States	430 EWR	1st place, gold medalist(s)	Vladimir Miroshnichenko (RUS)	143	1st place, gold medalist(s)	Russia	413
2nd place, silver medalist(s)	Jeffrey Holguin (USA)	186+2 (144)	2nd place, silver medalist(s)	Italy	421	2nd place, silver medalist(s)	Davide Gasparini (ITA)	139+7	2nd place, silver medalist(s)	United States	407
3rd place, bronze medalist(s)	Wang Nan (CHN)	186+0 (144)	3rd place, bronze medalist(s)	Great Britain	418	3rd place, bronze medalist(s)	Alessandro Chianese (ITA)	139+6	3rd place, bronze medalist(s)	Italy	402
Skeet
1st place, gold medalist(s)	Vincent Hancock (USA)	149 (124)	1st place, gold medalist(s)	United States	366 WR	1st place, gold medalist(s)	Milos Slavicek (CZE)	122	1st place, gold medalist(s)	Czech Republic	353
2nd place, silver medalist(s)	Georgios Achilleos (CYP)	148 (123)	2nd place, silver medalist(s)	Finland	361	2nd place, silver medalist(s)	Marcus Svensson (SWE)	121+4	2nd place, silver medalist(s)	United States	349
3rd place, bronze medalist(s)	Ennio Falco (ITA)	147 (122)	3rd place, bronze medalist(s)	Denmark	361	3rd place, bronze medalist(s)	Angelo Moscariello (ITA)	121+3	3rd place, bronze medalist(s)	Sweden	348

== Women ==
Individual			Teams			Juniors			Junior teams		
Trap
1st place, gold medalist(s)	Jessica Rossi (ITA)	92 (71)	1st place, gold medalist(s)	Italy	211 WR	1st place, gold medalist(s)	Qi Qiuwen (CHN)	69	1st place, gold medalist(s)	China	202 WR
2nd place, silver medalist(s)	Irina Laricheva (RUS)	90 (73)	2nd place, silver medalist(s)	Great Britain	207	2nd place, silver medalist(s)	Xu Tian (CHN)	68+1	2nd place, silver medalist(s)	Spain	186
3rd place, bronze medalist(s)	Satu Mäkelä-Nummela (FIN)	89 (74 EWR)	3rd place, bronze medalist(s)	San Marino	204	3rd place, bronze medalist(s)	Rachel Yardy (GBR)	68+0	3rd place, bronze medalist(s)	United States	185
Skeet
1st place, gold medalist(s)	Christine Brinker (GER)	95 (72)	1st place, gold medalist(s)	Russia	211	1st place, gold medalist(s)	Therese Lundqvist (SWE)	74 WR	1st place, gold medalist(s)	United States	204 WR
2nd place, silver medalist(s)	Sutiya Jiewchaloemmit (THA)	94 (73)	2nd place, silver medalist(s)	Italy	209	2nd place, silver medalist(s)	Amber English (USA)	71	2nd place, silver medalist(s)	Russia	192
3rd place, bronze medalist(s)	Katiuscia Spada (ITA)	93 (72)	3rd place, bronze medalist(s)	Slovakia	204	3rd place, bronze medalist(s)	Natalia Panas (RUS)	69	3rd place, bronze medalist(s)	Poland	191

== Competition schedule ==
Date	Men, junior men	Women, junior women
Saturday, 8 August	Trap, day 1	
Sunday, 9 August	Trap, day 2	
Monday, 10 August		
Tuesday, 11 August		Trap and skeet
Wednesday, 12 August		
Thursday, 13 August	Double trap	
Friday, 14 August		
Saturday, 15 August	Skeet, day 1	
Sunday, 16 August	Skeet, day 2	
