= Satu Mäkelä-Nummela =

Finnish sport shooter (born 1970)

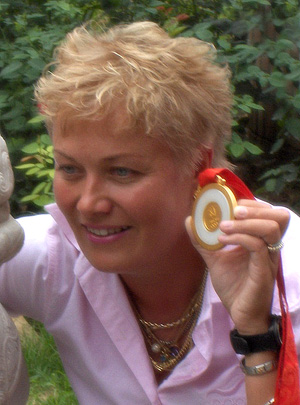
- Satu Mäkelä-Nummela celebrating her gold medal in Beijing 2008

Personal information
- Nationality: Finnish
- Born: 26 October 1970 (age 55) Orimattila, Finland

Sport
- Sport: Sports shooting
Medal record
Women's shooting
Representing Finland
Olympic Games
Gold medal – first place	2008 Beijing	Trap
World Championships
Silver medal – second place	2015 Lonato del Garda	Team trap
Silver medal – second place	2017 Moscow	Team trap
Silver medal – second place	2022 Osijek	Team trap
Bronze medal – third place	1995 Nicosia	Trap
Bronze medal – third place	1995 Nicosia	Team trap
Bronze medal – third place	2009 Maribor	Trap
European Games
Silver medal – second place	2023 Kraków-Małopolska	Trap
European Championships
Gold medal – first place	2023 Osijek	Team trap
Gold medal – first place	2024 Lonato	Team trap
Bronze medal – third place	2012 Larnaca	Team trap
Bronze medal – third place	2017 Baku	Trap
Bronze medal – third place	2018 Leobersdorf	Team trap
Bronze medal – third place	2025 Chateauroux	Trap Team
Bronze medal – third place	2026 Athens	Team Trap

Satu Mäkelä-Nummela (born 26 October 1970, in Orimattila, Finland) is a Finnish sports shooter. She won the gold medal in the Women's Trap event at the 2008 Summer Olympics. She has also won bronze medals in Women's Trap event in 1995 and 2009 at ISSF World Shotgun Championships. Her club is OSU (Orimattilan Seudun Urheiluampujat).

She qualified to represent Finland at the 2020 Summer Olympics.

Olympic Games
Preceded by Tuuli Petäjä-Sirén	Flagbearer for Finland (with Ari-Pekka Liukkonen); Tokyo 2020	Succeeded by Incumbent
