= Manuel Mancini (sport shooter) =

Sammarinese professional target shooter (born 1982)

Personal information
- Full name: Manuel Mancini
- Born: 1982 (age 43–44)
Medal record
Representing San Marino
European Games
| Bronze medal – third place | 2015 Baku | Mixed Trap |
Games of the Small States of Europe
| Gold medal – first place | 2017 San Marino | Trap |

Manuel Mancini is a Sammarinese professional target shooter.

He finished 8th in 2013 World Championships. In 2015 European Games he won bronze in mixed trap shooting with Alessandra Perilli.
