= 2015 ISSF World Cup =

The 2015 ISSF World Cup is the annual edition of the ISSF World Cup in the Olympic shooting events, governed by the International Shooting Sport Federation.

== Men's results ==
=== Rifle events ===
| 50 metre rifle three positions | | | 50 metre rifle prone | | | 10 metre air rifle | | |
| Changwon (April 8 - 16) | | | Changwon (April 8 - 16) | | | Changwon (April 8 - 16) | | |
|---|---|---|---|---|---|---|---|---|
| 1st place, gold medalist(s) | Hui Zicheng (CHN) | 457.3 | 1st place, gold medalist(s) | Matthew Emmons (USA) | 208.3 | 1st place, gold medalist(s) | Péter Sidi (HUN) | 208.2 |
| 2nd place, silver medalist(s) | Matthew Emmons (USA) | 456.0 | 2nd place, silver medalist(s) | Kim Hak-man (KOR) | 206.6 | 2nd place, silver medalist(s) | Haoran Yang (CHN) | 206.7 |
| 3rd place, bronze medalist(s) | Han Jin-seop (KOR) | 445.1 | 3rd place, bronze medalist(s) | Torben Grimmel (DEN) | 186.4 | 3rd place, bronze medalist(s) | Zhu Qinan (CHN) | 185.3 |
| Fort Benning (May 11 - 19) | | | Fort Benning (May 11 - 19) | | | Fort Benning (May 11 - 19) | | |
| 1st place, gold medalist(s) | Yuriy Yurkov (KAZ) | 456.3 | 1st place, gold medalist(s) | Michael McPhail (USA) | 208.8 | 1st place, gold medalist(s) | Milutin Stefanović (SRB) | 209.7 |
| 2nd place, silver medalist(s) | Zhu Qinan (CHN) | 455.3 | 2nd place, silver medalist(s) | Ole Kristian Bryhn (NOR) | 206.3 | 2nd place, silver medalist(s) | Haoran Yang (CHN) | 209.0 |
| 3rd place, bronze medalist(s) | Matthew Emmons (USA) | 445.0 | 3rd place, bronze medalist(s) | Gagan Narang (IND) | 185.8 | 3rd place, bronze medalist(s) | Anton Rizov (BUL) | 185.8 |
| Munich (May 26 - Jun 2) | | | Munich (May 26 - Jun 2) | | | Munich (May 26 - Jun 2) | | |
| 1st place, gold medalist(s) | Andre Link (GER) | 458.7 | 1st place, gold medalist(s) | Michael McPhail (USA) | 209.1 | 1st place, gold medalist(s) | Zhu Qinan (CHN) | 206.0 |
| 2nd place, silver medalist(s) | Haoran Yang (CHN) | 457.0 | 2nd place, silver medalist(s) | Cyril Graff (FRA) | 208.9 | 2nd place, silver medalist(s) | Vladimir Maslennikov (RUS) | 205.7 |
| 3rd place, bronze medalist(s) | Nazar Louginets (RUS) | 444.8 | 3rd place, bronze medalist(s) | Vitali Bubnovich (BLR) | 188.3 | 3rd place, bronze medalist(s) | Oleh Tsarkov (UKR) | 184.2 |
| Gabala (Aug 6 - 16) | | | Gabala (Aug 6 - 16) | | | Gabala (Aug 6 - 16) | | |
| 1st place, gold medalist(s) | Hui Zicheng (CHN) | 459.8 | 1st place, gold medalist(s) | Kirill Grigoryan (RUS) | 209.3 | 1st place, gold medalist(s) | Cao Yifei (CHN) | 207.4 |
| 2nd place, silver medalist(s) | Alexander Schmirl (AUT) | 457.9 | 2nd place, silver medalist(s) | Matthew Emmons (USA) | 208.4 | 2nd place, silver medalist(s) | Kim Sang Do (KOR) | 206.9 |
| 3rd place, bronze medalist(s) | Zhu Qinan (CHN) | 446.8 | 3rd place, bronze medalist(s) | Tomas Jerabek (CZE) | 186.6 | 3rd place, bronze medalist(s) | Petar Gorsa (CRO) | 186.5 |
| Final: Munich (Sep 1 - 7) | | | Final: Munich (Sep 1 - 7) | | | Final: Munich (Sep 1 - 7) | | |
| 1st place, gold medalist(s) | Matthew Emmons (USA) | 458.8 | 1st place, gold medalist(s) | Michael McPhail (USA) | 208.5 | 1st place, gold medalist(s) | Haoran Yang (CHN) | 207.0 |
| 2nd place, silver medalist(s) | Haoran Yang (CHN) | 458.2 | 2nd place, silver medalist(s) | Kirill Grigoryan (RUS) | 207.5 | 2nd place, silver medalist(s) | Oleh Tsarkov (UKR) | 206.6 |
| 3rd place, bronze medalist(s) | Sergey Kamenskiy (RUS) | 447.0 | 3rd place, bronze medalist(s) | Bojan Durkovic (CRO) | 186.5 | 3rd place, bronze medalist(s) | Milutin Stefanović (SRB) | 184.6 |

=== Pistol events ===
| 50 metre pistol | | | 25 metre rapid fire pistol | | | 10 metre air pistol | | |
| Changwon (April 8 - 16) | | | Changwon (April 8 - 16) | | | Changwon (April 8 - 16) | | |
|---|---|---|---|---|---|---|---|---|
| 1st place, gold medalist(s) | Bowen Zhang (CHN) | 192.4 | 1st place, gold medalist(s) | Jean Quiquampoix (FRA) | 29 | 1st place, gold medalist(s) | Jin Jong-oh (KOR) | 206.0 |
| 2nd place, silver medalist(s) | Park Dae-hun (KOR) | 191.1 | 2nd place, silver medalist(s) | Oliver Geis (GER) | 27 | 2nd place, silver medalist(s) | Ye Tun Naung (MYA) | 201.0 |
| 3rd place, bronze medalist(s) | Hoàng Xuân Vinh (VIE) | 171.8 | 3rd place, bronze medalist(s) | Song Jong-ho (KOR) | 24 | 3rd place, bronze medalist(s) | Jitu Rai (IND) | 181.1 |
| Fort Benning (May 11 - 19) | | | Fort Benning (May 11 - 19) | | | Fort Benning (May 11 - 19) | | |
| 1st place, gold medalist(s) | Damir Mikec (SRB) | 193.1 | 1st place, gold medalist(s) | Oliver Geis (GER) | 33 | 1st place, gold medalist(s) | Jin Jong-oh (KOR) | 202.0 |
| 2nd place, silver medalist(s) | Jin Jong-oh (KOR) | 191.1 | 2nd place, silver medalist(s) | Leuris Pupo (CUB) | 30 | 2nd place, silver medalist(s) | Vladimir Isakov (RUS) | 199.9 |
| 3rd place, bronze medalist(s) | Hoàng Xuân Vinh (VIE) | 168.3 | 3rd place, bronze medalist(s) | Christian Reitz (GER) | 24 | 3rd place, bronze medalist(s) | João Costa (POR) | 178.4 |
| Munich (May 26 - Jun 2) | | | Munich (May 26 - Jun 2) | | | Munich (May 26 - Jun 2) | | |
| 1st place, gold medalist(s) | João Costa (POR) | 194.7 | 1st place, gold medalist(s) | Christian Reitz (GER) | 32 | 1st place, gold medalist(s) | João Costa (POR) | 201.4 |
| 2nd place, silver medalist(s) | Bowen Zhang (CHN) | 188.5 | 2nd place, silver medalist(s) | Keith Sanderson (USA) | 26 | 2nd place, silver medalist(s) | Tomoyuki Matsuda (JPN) | 200.4 |
| 3rd place, bronze medalist(s) | Tomoyuki Matsuda (JPN) | 168.6 | 3rd place, bronze medalist(s) | Alexei Klimov (RUS) | 22 | 3rd place, bronze medalist(s) | Sun Yang (CHN) | 177.3 |
| Gabala (Aug 6 - 16) | | | Gabala (Aug 6 - 16) | | | Gabala (Aug 6 - 16) | | |
| 1st place, gold medalist(s) | Jiajie Mai (CHN) | 194.7 | 1st place, gold medalist(s) | Haozhe Hu (CHN) | 32 | 1st place, gold medalist(s) | Kim Cheong-yong (KOR) | 199.0 |
| 2nd place, silver medalist(s) | Park Dae-hun (KOR) | 191.4 | 2nd place, silver medalist(s) | Jiajie Lao (CHN) | 30 | 2nd place, silver medalist(s) | Vladimir Issachenko (KAZ) | 197.4 |
| 3rd place, bronze medalist(s) | Kim Cheong-yong (KOR) | 169.9 | 3rd place, bronze medalist(s) | Boris Artuad (FRA) | 25 | 3rd place, bronze medalist(s) | Juraj Tuzinsky (SVK) | 178.9 |
| Final: Munich (Sep 1 - 7) | | | Final: Munich (Sep 1 - 7) | | | Final: Munich (Sep 1 - 7) | | |
| 1st place, gold medalist(s) | Bowen Zhang (CHN) | 192.6 | 1st place, gold medalist(s) | Jean Quiquampoix (FRA) | 32 | 1st place, gold medalist(s) | Vladimir Isakov (RUS) | 200.7 |
| 2nd place, silver medalist(s) | Hoàng Xuân Vinh (VIE) | 189.3 | 2nd place, silver medalist(s) | Leonid Ekimov (RUS) | 31 | 2nd place, silver medalist(s) | João Costa (POR) | 196.5 |
| 3rd place, bronze medalist(s) | Zhiwei Wang (CHN) | 173.6 | 3rd place, bronze medalist(s) | Kim Jun-hong (KOR) | 27 | 3rd place, bronze medalist(s) | Kim Cheong-yong (KOR) | 177.5 |

=== Shotgun events ===
| Trap | | Double trap | | Skeet | |
| Acapulco (February 28–March 10) | | Acapulco (February 28–March 10) | | Acapulco (February 28–March 10) | |
|---|---|---|---|---|---|
| 1st place, gold medalist(s) | Massimo Fabbrizi (ITA) | 1st place, gold medalist(s) | Jeffrey Holguin (USA) | 1st place, gold medalist(s) | Vincent Hancock (USA) |
| 2nd place, silver medalist(s) | Michael Diamond (AUS) | 2nd place, silver medalist(s) | Hu Binyuan (CHN) | 2nd place, silver medalist(s) | Valerio Luchini (ITA) |
| 3rd place, bronze medalist(s) | Manavjit Singh Sandhu (IND) | 3rd place, bronze medalist(s) | Derek Haldeman (USA) | 3rd place, bronze medalist(s) | Ricardo Filippelli (ITA) |
| Al Ain (March 19–29) | | Al Ain (March 19–29) | | Al Ain (March 19–29) | |
| 1st place, gold medalist(s) | David Kostelecký (CZE) | 1st place, gold medalist(s) | Vasily Mosin (RUS) | 1st place, gold medalist(s) | Anthony Terras (FRA) |
| 2nd place, silver medalist(s) | Josip Glasnović (CRO) | 2nd place, silver medalist(s) | Marco Innocenti (ITA) | 2nd place, silver medalist(s) | Jesper Hansen (DEN) |
| 3rd place, bronze medalist(s) | Oğuzhan Tüzün (TUR) | 3rd place, bronze medalist(s) | Davide Gasparini (ITA) | 3rd place, bronze medalist(s) | Andreas Chasikos (CYP) |
| Larnaca (April 24–May 4) | | Larnaca (April 24–May 4) | | Larnaca (April 24–May 4) | |
| 1st place, gold medalist(s) | David Kostelecký (CZE) | 1st place, gold medalist(s) | Antonino Barillà (ITA) | 1st place, gold medalist(s) | Saif bin Futtais (UAE) |
| 2nd place, silver medalist(s) | Yavuz Ilnam (TUR) | 2nd place, silver medalist(s) | Enrique Brol (GUA) | 2nd place, silver medalist(s) | Marcus Svensson (SWE) |
| 3rd place, bronze medalist(s) | Josip Glasnović (CRO) | 3rd place, bronze medalist(s) | Qiang Pan (CHN) | 3rd place, bronze medalist(s) | Anton Astakhov (RUS) |
| Gabala (August 6–16) | | Gabala (August 6–16) | | Gabala (August 6–16) | |
| 1st place, gold medalist(s) | Alexey Alipov (RUS) | 1st place, gold medalist(s) | Walton Eller (USA) | 1st place, gold medalist(s) | Vincent Hancock (USA) |
| 2nd place, silver medalist(s) | Giovanni Cernogoraz (CRO) | 2nd place, silver medalist(s) | Steven Scott (GBR) | 2nd place, silver medalist(s) | Sebastian Kuntschik (AUT) |
| 3rd place, bronze medalist(s) | Erminio Frasca (ITA) | 3rd place, bronze medalist(s) | Vasily Mosin (RUS) | 3rd place, bronze medalist(s) | Gabriele Rossetti (ITA) |
| Final: Nicosia (October 15–21) | | Final: Nicosia (October 15–21) | | Final: Nicosia (October 15–21) | |
| 1st place, gold medalist(s) | Giovanni Cernogoraz (CRO) | 1st place, gold medalist(s) | Steven Scott (GBR) | 1st place, gold medalist(s) | Gabriele Rossetti (ITA) |
| 2nd place, silver medalist(s) | Giovanni Pellielo (ITA) | 2nd place, silver medalist(s) | Pan Qiang (CHN) | 2nd place, silver medalist(s) | Vincent Hancock (USA) |
| 3rd place, bronze medalist(s) | Alexey Alipov (RUS) | 3rd place, bronze medalist(s) | Asab Mohd (IND) | 3rd place, bronze medalist(s) | Jesper Hansen (DEN) |

== Women's results ==
=== Rifle events ===
| 50 metre rifle three positions | | | 10 metre air rifle | | |
| Changwon (April 8 - 16) | | | Changwon (April 8 - 16) | | |
|---|---|---|---|---|---|
| 1st place, gold medalist(s) | Snježana Pejčić (CRO) | 463.0 | 1st place, gold medalist(s) | Snježana Pejčić (CRO) | 209.1 |
| 2nd place, silver medalist(s) | Petra Zublasing (ITA) | 459.0 | 2nd place, silver medalist(s) | Ivana Maksimović (SRB) | 207.7 |
| 3rd place, bronze medalist(s) | Selina Gschwandtner (GER) | 444.7 | 3rd place, bronze medalist(s) | Apurvi Chandela (IND) | 185.6 |
| Fort Benning (May 11 - 19) | | | Fort Benning (May 11 - 19) | | |
| 1st place, gold medalist(s) | Jing Chang (CHN) | 463.3 | 1st place, gold medalist(s) | Andrea Arsović (SRB) | 208.1 |
| 2nd place, silver medalist(s) | Snježana Pejčić (CRO) | 461.1 | 2nd place, silver medalist(s) | Snježana Pejčić (CRO) | 207.8 |
| 3rd place, bronze medalist(s) | Barbara Engleder (GER) | 449.8 | 3rd place, bronze medalist(s) | Stine Nielsen (DEN) | 184.5 |
| Munich (May 26 - Jun 2) | | | Munich (May 26 - Jun 2) | | |
| 1st place, gold medalist(s) | Barbara Engleder (GER) | 461.5 | 1st place, gold medalist(s) | Yi Siling (CHN) | 209.8 |
| 2nd place, silver medalist(s) | Yo Seo Young (KOR) | 455.0 | 2nd place, silver medalist(s) | Valentina Gustin (CRO) | 207.3 |
| 3rd place, bronze medalist(s) | Yi Siling (CHN) | 444.6 | 3rd place, bronze medalist(s) | Chen Dongqi (CHN) | 184.3 |
| Gabala (Aug 6 - 16) | | | Gabala (Aug 6 - 16) | | |
| 1st place, gold medalist(s) | Dongqi Chen (CHN) | 456.2 | 1st place, gold medalist(s) | Elaheh Ahmadi (IRI) | 207.8 |
| 2nd place, silver medalist(s) | Yi Siling (CHN) | 455.4 | 2nd place, silver medalist(s) | Zhang Binbin (CHN) | 207.4 |
| 3rd place, bronze medalist(s) | Anna Zhukova (RUS) | 444.8 | 3rd place, bronze medalist(s) | Najmeh Khedmati (IRI) | 185.5 |
| Final: Munich (Sep 1 - 7) | | | Final: Munich (Sep 1 - 7) | | |
| 1st place, gold medalist(s) | Selina Gschwandtner (GER) | 459.4 | 1st place, gold medalist(s) | Elaheh Ahmadi (IRI) | 207.5 |
| 2nd place, silver medalist(s) | | 455.6 | 2nd place, silver medalist(s) | Apurvi Chandela (IND) | 206.9 |
| 3rd place, bronze medalist(s) | Snježana Pejčić (CRO) | 446.5 | 3rd place, bronze medalist(s) | Andrea Arsović (SRB) | 186.4 |

=== Pistol events ===
| 25 metre pistol | | 10 metre air pistol | | |
| Changwon (April 8 - 16) | | | Changwon (April 8 - 16) | |
|---|---|---|---|---|
| 1st place, gold medalist(s) | Otryadyn Gündegmaa (MGL) | 1st place, gold medalist(s) | Liubov Yaskevich (RUS) | 198.3 |
| 2nd place, silver medalist(s) | Lin Yuemei (CHN) | 2nd place, silver medalist(s) | Zhang Mengxue (CHN) | 197.7 |
| 3rd place, bronze medalist(s) | Antoaneta Boneva (BUL) | 3rd place, bronze medalist(s) | Jung Hye Kwak (KOR) | 175.0 |
| Fort Benning (May 11 - 19) | | | Fort Benning (May 11 - 19) | |
| 1st place, gold medalist(s) | Otryadyn Gündegmaa (MGL) | 1st place, gold medalist(s) | Antoaneta Boneva (BUL) | 199.4 |
| 2nd place, silver medalist(s) | Antoaneta Boneva (BUL) | 2nd place, silver medalist(s) | Otryadyn Gündegmaa (MGL) | 197.3 |
| 3rd place, bronze medalist(s) | Jingjing Zhang (CHN) | 3rd place, bronze medalist(s) | Anna Korakaki (GRE) | 178.9 |
| Munich (May 26 - Jun 2) | | | Munich (May 26 - Jun 2) | |
| 1st place, gold medalist(s) | Jingjing Zhang (CHN) | 1st place, gold medalist(s) | Antoaneta Boneva (BUL) | 200.6 |
| 2nd place, silver medalist(s) | Tanyaporn Prucksakorn (THA) | 2nd place, silver medalist(s) | Bobana Veličković (SRB) | 198.2 |
| 3rd place, bronze medalist(s) | Yuliya Alipava (RUS) | 3rd place, bronze medalist(s) | Liubov Yaskevich (RUS) | 177.4 |
| Gabala (Aug 6 - 16) | | | Gabala (Aug 6 - 16) | |
| 1st place, gold medalist(s) | Lija Cao (CHN) | 1st place, gold medalist(s) | Zorana Arunović (SRB) | 199.0 |
| 2nd place, silver medalist(s) | Vitalina Batsarashkina (RUS) | 2nd place, silver medalist(s) | Yuemei Lin (CHN) | 197.7 |
| 3rd place, bronze medalist(s) | Jingjing Zhang (CHN) | 3rd place, bronze medalist(s) | Chia Chen Tien (TPE) | 177.7 |
| Final: Munich (Sep 1 - 7) | | | Final: Munich (Sep 1 - 7) | |
| 1st place, gold medalist(s) | Jingjing Zhang (CHN) | 1st place, gold medalist(s) | Zorana Arunović (SRB) | 198.5 |
| 2nd place, silver medalist(s) | Otryadyn Gündegmaa (MGL) | 2nd place, silver medalist(s) | Anna Korakaki (GRE) | 198.3 |
| 3rd place, bronze medalist(s) | Lija Cao (CHN) | 3rd place, bronze medalist(s) | Liubov Yaskevich (RUS) | 178.9 |

=== Shotgun events ===
| Trap | | Skeet | |
| Acapulco (February 28–March 10) | | Acapulco (February 28–March 10) | |
|---|---|---|---|
| 1st place, gold medalist(s) | Corey Cogdell (USA) | 1st place, gold medalist(s) | Kimberly Rhode (USA) |
| 2nd place, silver medalist(s) | Laetisha Scanlan (AUS) | 2nd place, silver medalist(s) | Caitlin Connor (USA) |
| 3rd place, bronze medalist(s) | Natalie Rooney (NZL) | 3rd place, bronze medalist(s) | Wei Meng (CHN) |
| Al Ain (March 19–29) | | Al Ain (March 19–29) | |
| 1st place, gold medalist(s) | Silvana Stanco (ITA) | 1st place, gold medalist(s) | Diana Bacosi (ITA) |
| 2nd place, silver medalist(s) | Alessandra Perilli (SMR) | 2nd place, silver medalist(s) | Chiara Cainero (ITA) |
| 3rd place, bronze medalist(s) | Zuzana Rehák-Štefečeková (SVK) | 3rd place, bronze medalist(s) | Katiuscia Spada (ITA) |
| Larnaca (April 24–May 4) | | Larnaca (April 24–May 4) | |
| 1st place, gold medalist(s) | Satu Mäkelä-Nummela (FIN) | 1st place, gold medalist(s) | Diana Bacosi (ITA) |
| 2nd place, silver medalist(s) | Tatiana Barsuk (RUS) | 2nd place, silver medalist(s) | Yu Xiumin (CHN) |
| 3rd place, bronze medalist(s) | Fátima Gálvez (ESP) | 3rd place, bronze medalist(s) | Morgan Craft (USA) |
| Gabala (August 6–16) | | Gabala (August 6–16) | |
| 1st place, gold medalist(s) | Yukie Nakayama (JPN) | 1st place, gold medalist(s) | Katiuscia Spada (ITA) |
| 2nd place, silver medalist(s) | Lin Yi-chun (TPE) | 2nd place, silver medalist(s) | Morgan Craft (USA) |
| 3rd place, bronze medalist(s) | Corey Cogdell (USA) | 3rd place, bronze medalist(s) | Amber Hill (GBR) |
| Final: Nicosia (October 15–21) | | Final: Nicosia (October 15–21) | |
| 1st place, gold medalist(s) | Alessandra Perilli (SMR) | 1st place, gold medalist(s) | Amber Hill (GBR) |
| 2nd place, silver medalist(s) | Zuzana Rehák-Štefečeková (SVK) | 2nd place, silver medalist(s) | Sutiya Jiewchaloemmit (THA) |
| 3rd place, bronze medalist(s) | Fátima Gálvez (ESP) | 3rd place, bronze medalist(s) | Morgan Craft (USA) |
