= 2014 ISSF World Cup =

The 2014 ISSF World Cup is the annual edition of the ISSF World Cup in the Olympic shooting events, governed by the International Shooting Sport Federation.

== Men's results ==
=== Rifle events ===
Venue	1st place, gold medalist(s)		2nd place, silver medalist(s)		3rd place, bronze medalist(s)	
Men's 50 m Rifle Three Positions
Fort Benning	Niccolò Campriani (ITA)	453.4	Kang Hongwei (CHN)	453.0	Nazar Louginets (RUS)	443.1
Munich	Nazar Louginets (RUS)	462.5 FWR	Daniel Brodmeier (GER)	459.2	Cao Yifei (CHN)	449.5
Maribor	Sergey Kamenskiy (RUS)	459.7	Cao Yifei (CHN)	459.5	Daniel Brodmeier (GER)	449.0
Beijing	Niccolò Campriani (ITA)	458.8	Zhu Qinan (CHN)	458.1	Valérian Sauveplane (FRA)	448.8
Gabala (Final)	Sergey Kamenskiy (RUS)	459.3	Daniel Brodmeier (GER)	458.6	Ole-Kristian Bryhn (NOR)	446.7
Men's 50 m Rifle Prone
Fort Benning	Henri Junghänel (GER)	208.9	Liu Gang (CHN)	208.0	Nickolaus Mowrer (USA)	186.8
Munich	Zhao Shengbo (CHN)	208.9	Liu Gang (CHN)	208.5	Henri Junghänel (GER)	187.6
Maribor	Lan Xing (CHN)	209.0	Warren Potent (AUS)	207.7	Marcel Bürge (SUI)	186.4
Beijing	Hou Kai (CHN)	208.2	Lan Xing (CHN)	208.0	Sam Andersson (SWE)	187.2
Gabala (Final)	Daniel Brodmeier (GER)	210.5	Zhao Shengbo (CHN)	208.5	Henri Junghänel (GER)	187.9
Men's 10 m Air Rifle
Fort Benning	Nazar Louginets (RUS)	209.4	Milutin Stefanović (SRB)	209.3	Sergey Richter (ISR)	186.9
Munich	Yang Haoran (CHN)	207.7 FWRJ	Sergey Kruglov (RUS)	205.1	Niccolò Campriani (ITA)	184.8
Maribor	Zhu Qinan (CHN)	207.6	Péter Sidi (HUN)	206.2	Milutin Stefanović (SRB)	184.2
Beijing	Nazar Louginets (RUS)	209.3	Yang Haoran (CHN)	209.1 FWRJ	Péter Sidi (HUN)	187.0
Gabala (Final)	Nazar Louginets (RUS)	209.0	Niccolò Campriani (ITA)	205.8	Zhu Qinan (CHN)	184.2

=== Pistol events ===
Venue	1st place, gold medalist(s)		2nd place, silver medalist(s)		3rd place, bronze medalist(s)	
Men's 50m Pistol
Fort Benning	Anton Gourianov (RUS)	191.1	Tomoyuki Matsuda (JPN)	190.9	Andrija Zlatić (SRB)	170.6
Munich	Tomoyuki Matsuda (JPN)	194.0	Wang Zhiwei (CHN)	192.4	Pablo Carrera (ESP)	172.8
Maribor	Damir Mikec (SRB)	194.0	Jitu Rai (IND)	193.9	Tomoyuki Matsuda (JPN)	172.9
Beijing	Wang Zhiwei (CHN)	196.5	Jin Jong-oh (KOR)	193.0	Pu Qifeng (CHN)	176.2
Gabala (Final)	Wang Zhiwei (CHN)	195.8	Tomoyuki Matsuda (JPN)	194.8	Pang Wei (CHN)	170.1
Men's 25m Rapid Fire Pistol
Fort Benning	Keith Sanderson (USA)	33	Christian Reitz (GER)	26	Kehan Chen (CHN)	23
Munich	Alexei Klimov (RUS)	33	Hu Haozhe (CHN)	30	Christian Reitz (GER)	25
Maribor	Christian Reitz (GER)	30	Zhang Jian (CHN)	30	Leonid Yekimov (RUS)	24
Beijing	Riccardo Mazzetti (ITA)	35	Zhang Jian (CHN)	32	Martin Strnad (CZE)	28
Gabala (Final)	Leonid Yekimov (RUS)	35	Alexei Klimov (RUS)	31	Li Yuehong (CHN)	26
Men's 10 m Air Pistol
Fort Benning	Hoàng Xuân Vinh (VIE)	202.8	Sergey Chervyakovskiy (RUS)	202.3	Vladimir Gontcharov (RUS)	181.3
Munich	Pablo Carrera (ESP)	201.3	Jitu Rai (IND)	199.4	Pavlo Korostylov (UKR)	178.4
Maribor	Jitu Rai (IND)	200.8	Pablo Carrera (ESP)	198.7	Anton Gourianov (RUS)	177.2
Beijing	Jin Jong-oh (KOR)	200.6	Yusuf Dikeç (TUR)	200.3	Pu Qifeng (CHN)	180.9
Gabala (Final)	Sergey Chervyakovskiy (RUS)	200.4	Pablo Carrera (ESP)	199.9	Pang Wei (CHN)	177.4

=== Shotgun events ===
Venue	1st place, gold medalist(s)	2nd place, silver medalist(s)	3rd place, bronze medalist(s)
Men's Trap
Tucson	Manavjit Singh Sandhu (IND)	Michael Diamond (AUS)	Alexey Alipov (RUS)
Almaty	Alberto Fernández (ESP)	Erik Varga (SVK)	Fehaid Al-Deehani (KUW)
Munich	Antonio Bailon (ESP)	Massimo Fabbrizi (ITA)	Fehaid Al-Deehani (KUW)
Beijing	Jiří Lipták (CZE)	Alexey Alipov (RUS)	Daniele Resca (ITA)
Gabala (Final)	Massimo Fabbrizi (ITA)	Giovanni Pellielo (ITA)	Alberto Fernández (ESP)
Men's Double trap
Tucson	Jeffrey Holguin (USA)	Joshua Richmond (USA)	Vitaly Fokeev (RUS)
Almaty	Daniele di Spigno (ITA)	Joshua Richmond (USA)	Vasily Mosin (RUS)
Munich	Hubert Olejnik (SVK)	Walton Eller (USA)	Jeffrey Holguin (USA)
Beijing	Vitaly Fokeev (RUS)	Hu Binyuan (CHN)	Mikhail Leybo (RUS)
Gabala (Final)	Jeffrey Holguin (USA)	Wang Hao (CHN)	Hu Binyuan (CHN)
Men's Skeet
Tucson	Luigi Lodde (ITA)	Stefan Nilsson (SWE)	Dustin Perry (USA)
Almaty	Riccardo Filippelli (ITA)	Tore Brovold (NOR)	Alexandr Yechshenko (KAZ)
Munich	Jan Sychra (CZE)	Jin Di (CHN)	Sebastian Kuntschik (AUT)
Beijing	Abdullah Al-Rashidi (KUW)	Valerio Luchini (ITA)	Angelo Moscariello (ITA)
Gabala (Final)	Jin Di (CHN)	Azmy Mehelba (EGY)	Alexander Zemlin (RUS)

== Women's results ==
=== Rifle events ===
Venue	1st place, gold medalist(s)		2nd place, silver medalist(s)		3rd place, bronze medalist(s)	
Women's 50 m Rifle Three Positions
Fort Benning	Petra Zublasing (ITA)	462.0	Chang Jing (CHN)	458.2	Sarah Scherer (USA)	447.2
Munich	Sabrina Sena (ITA)	455.7	Petra Zublasing (ITA)	454.5	Chen Dongqi (CHN)	443.7
Maribor	Eva Rösken (GER)	453.6	Yi Siling (CHN)	453.3	Snježana Pejčić (CRO)	440.7
Beijing	Petra Zublasing (ITA)	458.8	Chang Jing (CHN)	457.1	Chen Dongqi (CHN)	445.9
Gabala (Final)	Snježana Pejčić (CRO)	460.2	Petra Zublasing (ITA)	459.9	Chang Jing (CHN)	450.0
Women's 10 m Air Rifle
Fort Benning	Chang Jing (CHN)	209.1	Ivana Maksimovic (SRB)	207.6	Anna Zhukova (RUS)	186.0
Munich	Martina Lindsay Veloso (SIN)	206.9	Kateřina Emmons (CZE)	206.6	Andrea Arsović (SRB)	184.6
Maribor	Yi Siling (CHN)	209.6	Wu Liuxi (CHN)	207.6	Ayonika Paul (IND)	185.3
Beijing	Yi Siling (CHN)	211.0 FWR	Du Bei (CHN)	207.9	Zhang Binbin (CHN)	185.9
Gabala (Final)	Yi Siling (CHN)	207.7	Andrea Arsović (SRB)	207.4	Wu Liuxi (CHN)	185.6

=== Pistol events ===
Venue	1st place, gold medalist(s)		2nd place, silver medalist(s)		3rd place, bronze medalist(s)	
Women's 25 m Pistol
Fort Benning	Heidi Diethelm Gerber (SUI)		Nino Salukvadze (GEO)		Zhang Jingjing (CHN)	
Munich	Otryadyn Gündegmaa (MGL)		Munkhbayar Sorjsuren (GER)		Zhang Jingjing (CHN)	
Maribor	Monika Karsch (GER)		Otryadyn Gündegmaa (MGL)		Antoaneta Boneva (BUL)	
Beijing	Kim Jangmi (KOR)		Naphaswan Yangpaiboon (THA)		Zhang Jingjing (CHN)	
Gabala (Final)	Monika Karsch (GER)		Otryadyn Gündegmaa (MGL)		Zhang Jingjing (CHN)	
Women's 10 m Air Pistol
Fort Benning	Antoaneta Boneva (BUL)	203.6	Heena Sidhu (IND)	200.8	Zorana Arunović (SRB)	180.9
Munich	Guo Wenjun (CHN)	200.3	Klaudia Bres (POL)	198.6	Alejandra Zavala (MEX)	177.2
Maribor	Zorana Arunović (SRB)	202.4	Ekaterina Korshunova (RUS)	200.7	Antoaneta Boneva (BUL)	175.7
Beijing	Céline Goberville (FRA)	201.1	Tien Chia-chen (TPE)	200.3	Olga Kousnetsova (RUS)	178.9
Gabala (Final)	Alejandra Zavala (MEX)	201.5	Klaudia Bres (POL)	200.6	Céline Goberville (FRA)	176.2

=== Shotgun events ===
Venue	1st place, gold medalist(s)	2nd place, silver medalist(s)	3rd place, bronze medalist(s)
Women's Trap
Tucson	Laetisha Scanlan (AUS)	Sarah Wixey (GBR)	Catherine Skinner (AUS)
Almaty	Zuzana Rehák-Štefečeková (SVK)	Tatiana Barsuk (RUS)	Fátima Gálvez (ESP)
Munich	Victoria Rose Burch (USA)	Janessa Jo Beaman (USA)	Alessandra Perilli (SMR)
Beijing	Satu Mäkelä-Nummela (FIN)	Zhu Jingyu (CHN)	Chae Hye Gyong (PRK)
Gabala (Final)	Zuzana Rehák-Štefečeková (SVK)	Janessa Jo Beaman (USA)	Catherine Skinner (AUS)
Women's Skeet
Tucson	Danka Barteková (SVK)	Wei Meng (CHN)	Kimberly Rhode (USA)
Almaty	Kimberly Rhode (USA)	Chiara Cainero (ITA)	Christine Wenzel (GER)
Munich	Kimberly Rhode (USA)	Brandy Drozd (USA)	Haley Dunn (USA)
Beijing	Lin Piao Piao (CHN)	Simona Scocchetti (ITA)	Kim Min-ji (KOR)
Gabala (Final)	Albina Shakirova (RUS)	Wei Meng (CHN)	Danka Barteková (SVK)
