= 2016 ISSF World Cup =

The 2016 ISSF World Cup is the annual edition of the ISSF World Cup in the Olympic shooting events, governed by the International Shooting Sport Federation.

== Men's results ==
=== Rifle events ===
50 metre rifle three positions			50 metre rifle prone			10 metre air rifle		
Bangkok (March 1–9)			Bangkok (March 1–9)			Bangkok (March 1–9)		
1st place, gold medalist(s)	Matthew Emmons (USA)	458.6	1st place, gold medalist(s)	Torben Grimmel (DEN)	209.1	1st place, gold medalist(s)	Haoran Yang (CHN)	209.8 FWRJ
2nd place, silver medalist(s)	Serhiy Kulish (UKR)	456.8	2nd place, silver medalist(s)	Warren Potent (AUS)	208.3	2nd place, silver medalist(s)	Cao Yifei (CHN)	207.6
3rd place, bronze medalist(s)	Cao Yifei (CHN)	445.6	3rd place, bronze medalist(s)	Istvan Peni (HUN)	187.3	3rd place, bronze medalist(s)	Istvan Peni (HUN)	186.9
Rio de Janeiro (April 13–25)			Rio de Janeiro (April 13–25)			Rio de Janeiro (April 13–25)		
1st place, gold medalist(s)	Hui Zicheng (CHN)	463.7 FWR	1st place, gold medalist(s)	Henri Junghaenel (GER)	210.0	1st place, gold medalist(s)	Vladimir Maslennikov (RUS)	207.0
2nd place, silver medalist(s)	Matthew Emmons (USA)	461.6	2nd place, silver medalist(s)	Warren Potent (AUS)	207.9	2nd place, silver medalist(s)	Cao Yifei (CHN)	206.0
3rd place, bronze medalist(s)	Zhu Qinan (CHN)	451.2	3rd place, bronze medalist(s)	Stevan Pletikosić (SRB)	186.2	3rd place, bronze medalist(s)	Sergey Kamenskiy (RUS)	184.5
Munich (May 19–26)			Munich (May 19–26)			Munich (May 19–26)		
1st place, gold medalist(s)	Matthew Emmons (USA)	464.1 FWR	1st place, gold medalist(s)	Torben Grimmel (DEN)	210.6	1st place, gold medalist(s)	Qian Xuechao (CHN)	210.6 FWR, FWRJ
2nd place, silver medalist(s)	Milenko Sebic (SRB)	460.1	2nd place, silver medalist(s)	Henri Junghaenel (GER)	209.6	2nd place, silver medalist(s)	Cao Yifei (CHN)	208.3
3rd place, bronze medalist(s)	Gernot Rumpler (AUT)	448.0	3rd place, bronze medalist(s)	Matthew Emmons (USA)	187.2	3rd place, bronze medalist(s)	Serhiy Kulish (UKR)	186.8
Baku (June 20–29)			Baku (June 20–29)			Baku (June 20–29)		
1st place, gold medalist(s)	Peter Gorsa (CRO)	457.5	1st place, gold medalist(s)	Torben Grimmel (DEN)	208.4	1st place, gold medalist(s)	Filip Nepejchal (CZE)	206.8
2nd place, silver medalist(s)	Sanjeev Rajput (IND)	456.9	2nd place, silver medalist(s)	Kenneth Parr (GBR)	208.0	2nd place, silver medalist(s)	Hossein Bagheri (IRI)	206.2
3rd place, bronze medalist(s)	Kim Hyeonjun (KOR)	445.5	3rd place, bronze medalist(s)	Peter Gorsa (CRO)	187.5	3rd place, bronze medalist(s)	Sergey Richter (ISR)	184.6
Final: Bologna (Oct 4–10)			Final: Bologna (Oct 4–10)			Final: Bologna (Oct 4–10)		
1st place, gold medalist(s)	Sergey Kamenskiy (RUS)	461.4	1st place, gold medalist(s)	Michael Mcphail (USA)	209.1	1st place, gold medalist(s)	Péter Sidi (HUN)	207.7
2nd place, silver medalist(s)	Hui Zicheng (CHN)	460.5	2nd place, silver medalist(s)	Torben Grimmel (DEN)	208.5	2nd place, silver medalist(s)	Vladimir Maslennikov (RUS)	207.2
3rd place, bronze medalist(s)	Matthew Emmons (USA)	447.9	3rd place, bronze medalist(s)	Matthew Emmons (USA)	187.2	3rd place, bronze medalist(s)	Hossein Bagheri (IRI)	186.1

=== Pistol events ===
50 metre pistol			25 metre rapid fire pistol			10 metre air pistol		
Bangkok (March 1–9)			Bangkok (March 1–9)			Bangkok (March 1–9)		
1st place, gold medalist(s)	Jitu Rai (IND)	191.3	1st place, gold medalist(s)	Zhang Fusheng (CHN)	29	1st place, gold medalist(s)	Felipe Almeida Wu (BRA)	201.9
2nd place, silver medalist(s)	Wei Pang (CHN)	186.5	2nd place, silver medalist(s)	Li Yuehong (CHN)	28	2nd place, silver medalist(s)	Will Brown (USA)	201.4
3rd place, bronze medalist(s)	Wang Zhiwei (CHN)	165.8	3rd place, bronze medalist(s)	Ha Minh Thanh (VIE)	23	3rd place, bronze medalist(s)	Hoàng Xuân Vinh (VIE)	180.1
Rio de Janeiro (April 13–25)			Rio de Janeiro (April 13–25)			Rio de Janeiro (April 13–25)		
1st place, gold medalist(s)	Oleh Omlechuk (UKR)	191.3	1st place, gold medalist(s)	Alexei Klimov (RUS)	35 EFWR	1st place, gold medalist(s)	Pablo Carrera (ESP)	199.3
2nd place, silver medalist(s)	Jin Jongoh (KOR)	189.4	2nd place, silver medalist(s)	Keith Sanderson (USA)	31	2nd place, silver medalist(s)	Damir Mikec (SRB)	198.9
3rd place, bronze medalist(s)	Wang Zhiwei (CHN)	167.7	3rd place, bronze medalist(s)	Jean Quiquampoix (FRA)	26	3rd place, bronze medalist(s)	Juraj Tuzinsky (SVK)	179.2
Munich (May 19–26)			Munich (May 19–26)			Munich (May 19–26)		
1st place, gold medalist(s)	Pablo Carrera (ESP)	193.9	1st place, gold medalist(s)	Zhang Fusheng (CHN)	29	1st place, gold medalist(s)	Oleh Omelchuk (UKR)	201.9
2nd place, silver medalist(s)	Wei Pang (CHN)	190.3	2nd place, silver medalist(s)	Jean Quiquampoix (FRA)	28	2nd place, silver medalist(s)	Ismail Keles (TUR)	201.1
3rd place, bronze medalist(s)	Jin Jongoh (KOR)	170.4	3rd place, bronze medalist(s)	Cristian Reitz (GER)	24	3rd place, bronze medalist(s)	Hoàng Xuân Vinh (VIE)	179.8
Baku (June 20–29)			Baku (June 20–29)			Baku (June 20–29)		
1st place, gold medalist(s)	Jin Jongoh (KOR)	192.4	1st place, gold medalist(s)	Christian Reitz (GER)	32	1st place, gold medalist(s)	Felipe Almeida Wu (BRA)	200.0
2nd place, silver medalist(s)	Zhang Bowen (CHN)	187.9	2nd place, silver medalist(s)	Zhang Fusheng (CHN)	30	2nd place, silver medalist(s)	Jitu Rai (IND)	199.5
3rd place, bronze medalist(s)	Lee Daemyung (KOR)	167.1	3rd place, bronze medalist(s)	Minsu Kang (KOR)	25	3rd place, bronze medalist(s)	Jin Jongoh (KOR)	178.8
Final: Bologna (Oct 4–10)			Final: Bologna (Oct 4–10)			Final: Bologna (Oct 4–10)		
1st place, gold medalist(s)	Wei Pang (CHN)	190.6	1st place, gold medalist(s)	Cristian Reitz (GER)	34	1st place, gold medalist(s)	Damir Mikec (SRB)	202.9
2nd place, silver medalist(s)	Jitu Rai (IND)	188.8	2nd place, silver medalist(s)	Li Yuehong (CHN)	31	2nd place, silver medalist(s)	Wei Pang (CHN)	199.7
3rd place, bronze medalist(s)	Giuseppe Giordano (ITA)	170.3	3rd place, bronze medalist(s)	Alexei Klimov (RUS)	26	3rd place, bronze medalist(s)	Ismail Keles (TUR)	178.4

=== Shotgun events ===
Trap		Double trap		Skeet	
Nicosia (March 17–25)		Nicosia (March 17–25)		Nicosia (March 17–25)	
1st place, gold medalist(s)	Alberto Fernández (ESP)	1st place, gold medalist(s)	Alessandro Chianese (ITA)	1st place, gold medalist(s)	Mykola Milchev (UKR)
2nd place, silver medalist(s)	Antonio Bailon (ESP)	2nd place, silver medalist(s)	Jeffrey Holguin (USA)	2nd place, silver medalist(s)	Ben Williams David Llewellin (GBR)
3rd place, bronze medalist(s)	Giovanni Cernogoraz (CRO)	3rd place, bronze medalist(s)	James Willett (AUS)	3rd place, bronze medalist(s)	Juan Jose Aramburu (ESP)
Rio de Janeiro (April 13–25)		Rio de Janeiro (April 13–25)		Rio de Janeiro (April 13–25)	
1st place, gold medalist(s)	Alberto Fernández (ESP)	1st place, gold medalist(s)	James Willett (AUS)	1st place, gold medalist(s)	Marcus Svensson (SWE)
2nd place, silver medalist(s)	Yannik Peeters (BEL)	2nd place, silver medalist(s)	Vasily Mosin (RUS)	2nd place, silver medalist(s)	Mairaj Ahmad Khan (IND)
3rd place, bronze medalist(s)	Jean Pierre Brol Cardenas (GUA)	3rd place, bronze medalist(s)	Glenn Eller (USA)	3rd place, bronze medalist(s)	Tammare Cassandro (ITA)
San Marino (June 1–11)		San Marino (June 1–11)		San Marino (June 1–11)	
1st place, gold medalist(s)	Jiri Liptakv (CZE)	1st place, gold medalist(s)	Joshua Richmond (USA)	1st place, gold medalist(s)	Stefen Nilsson (SWE)
2nd place, silver medalist(s)	Daniele Resca (ITA)	2nd place, silver medalist(s)	Andreas Loew (GER)	2nd place, silver medalist(s)	Tammaro Cassandro (ITA)
3rd place, bronze medalist(s)	Alexey Alipov (RUS)	3rd place, bronze medalist(s)	Pan Qiang (CHN)	3rd place, bronze medalist(s)	Vincent Hancock (USA)
Baku (June 20–29)Baku (June 20–29)		Baku (June 20–29)		Baku (June 20–29)	
1st place, gold medalist(s)	Gian Marco Berti (SMR)	1st place, gold medalist(s)	William Chetcuti (MLT)	1st place, gold medalist(s)	Nikolay Teplyy (RUS)
2nd place, silver medalist(s)	Erik Varga (SVK)	2nd place, silver medalist(s)	Marco Innocenti (ITA)	2nd place, silver medalist(s)	Azmy Mehelba (EGY)
3rd place, bronze medalist(s)	Piotr Kowalczyk (POL)	3rd place, bronze medalist(s)	Mo Junjie (CHN)	3rd place, bronze medalist(s)	Tammare Cassandro (ITA)
Final: Rome (Oct 11–16)		Final: Rome (Oct 11–16)		Final: Rome (Oct 11–16)	
1st place, gold medalist(s)	Giovanni Cernogoraz (CRO)	1st place, gold medalist(s)	James Willett (AUS)	1st place, gold medalist(s)	Nikolay Teplyy (RUS)
2nd place, silver medalist(s)	Erik Varga (SVK)	2nd place, silver medalist(s)	Jeffrey Holguin (USA)	2nd place, silver medalist(s)	Mykola Milchev (UKR)
3rd place, bronze medalist(s)	Antonio Bailon (ESP)	3rd place, bronze medalist(s)	William Chetcuti (MLT)	3rd place, bronze medalist(s)	Azmy Mehelba (EGY)

== Women's results ==
=== Rifle events ===
50 metre rifle three positions			10 metre air rifle		
Bangkok (March 1–9)			Bangkok (March 1–9)		
1st place, gold medalist(s)	Jolyn Beer (GER)	455.9	1st place, gold medalist(s)	Yi Siling (CHN)	207.7
2nd place, silver medalist(s)	Snježana Pejčić (CRO)	454.5	2nd place, silver medalist(s)	Olivia Hofmann (AUT)	205.4
3rd place, bronze medalist(s)	Zhang Binbin (CHN)	444.0	3rd place, bronze medalist(s)	Jasmine Ser (SIN)	184.6
Rio de Janeiro (April 13–25)			Rio de Janeiro (April 13–25)		
1st place, gold medalist(s)	Snježana Pejčić (CRO)	458.8	1st place, gold medalist(s)	Du Li (CHN)	208.3
2nd place, silver medalist(s)	Barbara Engleder (GER)	455.6	2nd place, silver medalist(s)	Daria Vdovina (RUS)	208.0
3rd place, bronze medalist(s)	Nandinzaya Gankhuyag (MGL)	443.3	3rd place, bronze medalist(s)	Selina Gschwandtner (GER)	186.8
Munich (May 19–26)			Munich (May 19–26)		
1st place, gold medalist(s)	Snježana Pejčić (CRO)	462.7	1st place, gold medalist(s)	Andrea Arsovic (SRB)	208.5
2nd place, silver medalist(s)	Anzela Voronova (EST)	456.7	2nd place, silver medalist(s)	Goretti Zumaya (MEX)	207.9 EFWRJ
3rd place, bronze medalist(s)	Petra Zublasing (ITA)	446.8	3rd place, bronze medalist(s)	Shi Mengyao (CHN)	186.7
Baku (June 20–29)			Baku (June 20–29)		
1st place, gold medalist(s)	Snježana Pejčić (CRO)	459.7	1st place, gold medalist(s)	Du Bei (CHN)	208.6
2nd place, silver medalist(s)	Franziska Peer (AUT)	454.4	2nd place, silver medalist(s)	Shi Megyao (CHN)	208.3
3rd place, bronze medalist(s)	Zhao Huixin (CHN)	444.4	3rd place, bronze medalist(s)	Park Hae Mi (KOR)	185.1
Final: Bologna (Oct 4–10)			Final: Bologna (Oct 4–10)		
1st place, gold medalist(s)	Zhang Binbin (CHN)	460.2	1st place, gold medalist(s)	Andrea Arsovic (SRB)	209.0
2nd place, silver medalist(s)	Barbara Engleder (GER)	460.0	2nd place, silver medalist(s)	Yi Siling (CHN)	208.7
3rd place, bronze medalist(s)	Du Li (CHN)	448.9	3rd place, bronze medalist(s)	Virginia Thrasher (USA)	185.5

=== Pistol events ===
25 metre pistol		10 metre air pistol		
Bangkok (March 1–9)		Bangkok (March 1–9)		
1st place, gold medalist(s)	JingJing Zhang (CHN)	1st place, gold medalist(s)	Guo Wenjun (CHN)	199.8
2nd place, silver medalist(s)	Ju Hyun Park (KOR)	2nd place, silver medalist(s)	Tien Chia Chen (TPE)	197.8
3rd place, bronze medalist(s)	Gundegmaa Otryad (MGL)	3rd place, bronze medalist(s)	Zhang Mengxue (CHN)	177.8
Rio de Janeiro (April 13–25)		Rio de Janeiro (April 13–25)		
1st place, gold medalist(s)	Maria Grozdeva (BUL)	1st place, gold medalist(s)	Olena Kostevych (UKR)	201.7
2nd place, silver medalist(s)	JingJing Zhang (CHN)	2nd place, silver medalist(s)	Antoaneta Boneva (BUL)	197.7
3rd place, bronze medalist(s)	Olena Kostevych (UKR)	3rd place, bronze medalist(s)	Teo Shun Xie (SIN)	178.0
Munich (May 19–26)		Munich (May 19–26)		
1st place, gold medalist(s)	JingJing Zhang (CHN)	1st place, gold medalist(s)	Bobana Velickovic (SRB)	199.7
2nd place, silver medalist(s)	Olena Kostevych (UKR)	2nd place, silver medalist(s)	Sonia Franquet (ESP)	199.1
3rd place, bronze medalist(s)	Naphaswan Yanpaiboon (THA)	3rd place, bronze medalist(s)	Zhang Mengxue (CHN)	179.4
Baku (June 20–29)		Baku (June 20–29)		
1st place, gold medalist(s)	Antoaneta Boneva (BUL)	1st place, gold medalist(s)	Olena Kostevych (UKR)	200.2
2nd place, silver medalist(s)	Anna Korakaki (GRE)	2nd place, silver medalist(s)	Anna Korakaki (GRE)	199.1
3rd place, bronze medalist(s)	Kim Jangmi (KOR)	3rd place, bronze medalist(s)	Alejandra Zavala Vazquez (MEX)	175.9
Final: Bologna (Oct 4–10)		Final: Bologna (Oct 4–10)		
1st place, gold medalist(s)	Anna Korakaki (GRE)	1st place, gold medalist(s)	Alejandra Zavala Vazquez (MEX)	201.0 S-off: 9.8
2nd place, silver medalist(s)	Kim Jangmi (KOR)	2nd place, silver medalist(s)	Anna Korakaki (GRE)	201.0 S-off: 9.1, EFWRJ
3rd place, bronze medalist(s)	Olena Kostevych (UKR)	3rd place, bronze medalist(s)	Zhang Mengxue (CHN)	178.4

=== Shotgun events ===
Trap		Skeet	
Nicosia (March 17–25)		Nicosia (March 17–25)	
1st place, gold medalist(s)	Ray Bassil (LIB)	1st place, gold medalist(s)	Morgan Craft (USA)
2nd place, silver medalist(s)	Sonja Scheibl (GER)	2nd place, silver medalist(s)	Andri Eleftheriou (CYP)
3rd place, bronze medalist(s)	Fatima Galvez (ESP)	3rd place, bronze medalist(s)	Katharina Monika Jacob (USA)
Rio de Janeiro (April 13–25)		Rio de Janeiro (April 13–25)	
1st place, gold medalist(s)	Lin Yi-chun (TPE)	1st place, gold medalist(s)	Sutiya Jiewchaloemmit (THA)
2nd place, silver medalist(s)	Ray Bassil (LIB)	2nd place, silver medalist(s)	Kimberly Rhode (USA)
3rd place, bronze medalist(s)	Sonja Scheibl (GER)	3rd place, bronze medalist(s)	Lu Min (CHN)
San Marino (June 1–11)		San Marino (June 1–11)	
1st place, gold medalist(s)	Emma Elizabeth Cox (AUS)	1st place, gold medalist(s)	Sutiya Jiewchaloemmit (THA)
2nd place, silver medalist(s)	Corey Cogdell (USA)	2nd place, silver medalist(s)	Diana Bacosi (ITA)
3rd place, bronze medalist(s)	Carole Cormenier (FRA)	3rd place, bronze medalist(s)	Amber Hill (GBR)
Baku (June 20–29)		Baku (June 20–29)	
1st place, gold medalist(s)	Satu Makela-Nummela (FIN)	1st place, gold medalist(s)	Amber English (USA)
2nd place, silver medalist(s)	Ray Bassil (LIB)	2nd place, silver medalist(s)	Chiara Cainero (ITA)
3rd place, bronze medalist(s)	Alessia Iezzi (ITA)	3rd place, bronze medalist(s)	Simona Scocchetti (ITA)
Final: Rome (Oct 11–16)		Final: Rome (Oct 11–16)	
1st place, gold medalist(s)	Natalie Rooney (NZL)	1st place, gold medalist(s)	Kimberly Rhode (USA)
2nd place, silver medalist(s)	Alessandra Perilli (SMR)	2nd place, silver medalist(s)	Wei Meng (CHN)
3rd place, bronze medalist(s)	Corey Cogdell (USA)	3rd place, bronze medalist(s)	Sutiya Jiewchaloemmit (THA)

== Overall Medal Table ==
Rank	Nation	Gold	Silver	Bronze	Total
1	China	13	15	14	40
2	United States	7	7	8	22
3	Russia	5	3	3	11
3	Ukraine	5	3	3	11
5	Croatia	5	1	2	9
6	Germany	4	5	3	13
7	Spain	4	2	3	9
8	Serbia	4	2	1	7
9	Denmark	3	1	0	4
10	Australia	3	2	1	5
11	Bulgaria	2	1	0	3
12	Thailand	2	0	2	4
13	Brazil	2	0	0	2
13	Czech Republic	2	0	0	2
13	Sweden	2	0	0	2
16	Italy	1	5	6	12
17	India	1	4	0	5
18	South Korea	1	3	7	11
19	Greece	1	3	0	4
20	Lebanon	1	2	0	3
20	Chinese Taipei	1	2	0	3
22	Mexico	1	1	1	3
23	Malta	1	1	0	1
23	San Marino	1	1	0	1
25	Hungary	1	0	2	3
26	Finland	1	0	0	1
26	New Zealand	1	0	0	1
28	France	0	2	2	4
29	Austria	0	2	1	3
29	United Kingdom	0	2	1	3
29	Slovakia	0	2	1	3
32	Belgium	0	1	0	1
32	Cyprus	0	1	0	1
34	Egypt	0	1	1	2
34	Iran	0	1	1	2
34	Turkey	0	1	1	2
37	Vietnam	0	0	3	3
38	Mongolia	0	0	2	2
38	Singapore	0	0	2	2
40	Guatemala	0	0	1	1
40	Israel	0	0	1	1
40	Poland	0	0	1	1
Total	42	75	75	75	225
