= 2017 ISSF World Cup =

The 2017 ISSF World Cup is the annual edition of the ISSF World Cup in the Olympic shooting events, governed by the International Shooting Sport Federation.

== Men's results ==
=== Rifle events ===
50 metre rifle three positions			50 metre rifle prone			10 metre air rifle		
New Delhi India (22 Feb-04 Mar)			New Delhi India (22 Feb-04 Mar)			New Delhi India (22 Feb-04 Mar)		
1st place, gold medalist(s)	Hui Zicheng (CHN)	454.2	1st place, gold medalist(s)	Toshikazu Yamashita (JPN)	249.8 WR	1st place, gold medalist(s)	Song Buhan (CHN)	249.5 WR, WRJ
2nd place, silver medalist(s)	Sun Jian (CHN)	451.6	2nd place, silver medalist(s)	Liu Yunkun (CHN)	249.3 WRJ	2nd place, silver medalist(s)	Péter Sidi (HUN)	249.1
3rd place, bronze medalist(s)	Jan Lochbihler (SUI)	440.2	3rd place, bronze medalist(s)	Daniel Romanczyk (POL)	226.6	3rd place, bronze medalist(s)	Atsushi Shimada (JPN)	227.4
Munich Germany (17-24 May)			Munich Germany (17-24 May)			Munich Germany (17-24 May)		
1st place, gold medalist(s)	Alexis Raynaud (FRA)	463.5	1st place, gold medalist(s)	Kim Jong-hyun (KOR)	248.3	1st place, gold medalist(s)	Sergey Kamenskiy (RUS)	250.9 WR
2nd place, silver medalist(s)	Sergey Kamenskiy (RUS)	460.9	2nd place, silver medalist(s)	Stian Bogar (NOR)	248.2	2nd place, silver medalist(s)	Vladimir Maslennikov (RUS)	250.4
3rd place, bronze medalist(s)	Liu Yukun (CHN)	446.9	3rd place, bronze medalist(s)	Thomas Mathis (AUT)	227.1	3rd place, bronze medalist(s)	Vitali Bubnovich (BLR)	228.9
Gabala Azerbaijan (06-14 June)			Gabala Azerbaijan (06-14 June)			Gabala Azerbaijan (06-14 June)		
1st place, gold medalist(s)	István Péni (HUN)	458.4	1st place, gold medalist(s)	Torben Grimmel (DEN)	249.8 EWR	1st place, gold medalist(s)	Milutin Stefanović (SRB)	250.9 EWR S-off: 10.0
2nd place, silver medalist(s)	Hui Zicheng (CHN)	457.4	2nd place, silver medalist(s)	Yury Shcherbatsevich (BLR)	248.9	2nd place, silver medalist(s)	Yao Yuncong (CHN)	250.9 EWR S-off: 9.6
3rd place, bronze medalist(s)	Tomasz Bartnik (POL)	444.4	3rd place, bronze medalist(s)	Lionel Cox (BEL)	227.9	3rd place, bronze medalist(s)	István Péni (HUN)	229.4
Final- New Delhi India (23-30 Oct)			Final- New Delhi India (23-30 Oct)			Final- New Delhi India (23-30 Oct)		
1st place, gold medalist(s)	Alexis Raynaud (FRA)	461.7	1st place, gold medalist(s)	Torben Grimmel (DEN)	250.6 WR	1st place, gold medalist(s)	István Péni (HUN)	249.8 EWR
2nd place, silver medalist(s)	Filip Nepejchal (CZE)	458.5	2nd place, silver medalist(s)	Henri Junghänel (GER)	250.1	2nd place, silver medalist(s)	Vitali Bubnovich (BLR)	249.5
3rd place, bronze medalist(s)	István Péni (HUN)	449.1	3rd place, bronze medalist(s)	Kim Jong-hyun (KOR)	228.7	3rd place, bronze medalist(s)	Péter Sidi (HUN)	228.5

=== Pistol events ===
50 metre pistol			25 metre rapid fire pistol			10 metre air pistol		
New Delhi India (22 Feb-04 Mar)			New Delhi India (22 Feb-04 Mar)			New Delhi India (22 Feb-04 Mar)		
1st place, gold medalist(s)	Jitu Rai (IND)	230.1 WR	1st place, gold medalist(s)	Lao Jiajie (CHN)	31 S-off: 5	1st place, gold medalist(s)	Tomoyuki Matsuda (JPN)	240.1 WR
2nd place, silver medalist(s)	Amanpreet Singh (IND)	226.9	2nd place, silver medalist(s)	Lin Junmin (CHN)	31 S-off: 3	2nd place, silver medalist(s)	Hoàng Xuân Vinh (VIE)	236.6
3rd place, bronze medalist(s)	Vahid Golkhandan (IRI)	208.0	3rd place, bronze medalist(s)	Ruslan Lunev (AZE)	23	3rd place, bronze medalist(s)	Jitu Rai (IND)	216.7
Munich Germany (17-24 May)			Munich Germany (17-24 May)			Munich Germany (17-24 May)		
1st place, gold medalist(s)	Jin Jongoh (KOR)	230.5 WR	1st place, gold medalist(s)	Jean Quiquampoix (FRA)	33	1st place, gold medalist(s)	Pavlo Korostylov (UKR)	240.9 WRJ
2nd place, silver medalist(s)	João Costa (POR)	228.3	2nd place, silver medalist(s)	Zhang Jian (CHN)	31	2nd place, silver medalist(s)	Tomoyuki Matsuda (JPN)	238.7
3rd place, bronze medalist(s)	Dimitrije Grgic (SRB)	209.0	3rd place, bronze medalist(s)	Christian Reitz (GER)	25	3rd place, bronze medalist(s)	Jin Jongoh (KOR)	218.4
Gabala Azerbaijan (06-14 June)			Gabala Azerbaijan (06-14 June)			Gabala Azerbaijan (06-14 June)		
1st place, gold medalist(s)	Oleh Omelchuk (UKR)	230.4	1st place, gold medalist(s)	Christian Reitz (GER)	35 EWR	1st place, gold medalist(s)	Yang Wei (CHN)	240.1
2nd place, silver medalist(s)	Yusuf Dikeç (TUR)	228.5	2nd place, silver medalist(s)	Clément Bessaguet (FRA)	29	2nd place, silver medalist(s)	Tomoyuki Matsuda (JPN)	237.9
3rd place, bronze medalist(s)	Damir Mikec (SRB)	205.5	3rd place, bronze medalist(s)	Riccardo Mazzetti (ITA)	25	3rd place, bronze medalist(s)	Oleh Omelchuk (UKR)	217.1
Final- New Delhi India (23-30 Oct)			Final- New Delhi India (23-30 Oct)			Final- New Delhi India (23-30 Oct)		
1st place, gold medalist(s)	Damir Mikec (SRB)	229.3	1st place, gold medalist(s)	Keith Sanderson (USA)	31	1st place, gold medalist(s)	Tomoyuki Matsuda (JPN)	241.8 WR
2nd place, silver medalist(s)	Oleh Omelchuk (UKR)	228.0	2nd place, silver medalist(s)	Clément Bessaguet (FRA)	29	2nd place, silver medalist(s)	Pavlo Korostylov (UKR)	241.1 EWRJ
3rd place, bronze medalist(s)	Amanpreet Singh (IND)	202.2	3rd place, bronze medalist(s)	Song Jong-ho (KOR)	24	3rd place, bronze medalist(s)	Oleh Omelchuk (UKR)	218.8

=== Shotgun events ===
Trap			Double trap			Skeet		
New Delhi India (22 Feb-04 Mar)			New Delhi India (22 Feb-04 Mar)			New Delhi India (22 Feb-04 Mar)		
1st place, gold medalist(s)	Simone D Ambrosio (ITA)	45 WR	1st place, gold medalist(s)	James Willett (AUS)	75 WR	1st place, gold medalist(s)	Riccardo Filippelli (ITA)	57 WR
2nd place, silver medalist(s)	Giovanni Pellielo (ITA)	43	2nd place, silver medalist(s)	Ankur Mittal (IND)	74	2nd place, silver medalist(s)	Gabriele Rossetti (ITA)	53
3rd place, bronze medalist(s)	Alberto Fernández (ESP)	33	3rd place, bronze medalist(s)	James Dedman (GBR)	56 WRJ	3rd place, bronze medalist(s)	Paul Adams (AUS)	45
Acapulco Mexico (17-27 Mar)			Acapulco Mexico (17-27 Mar)			Acapulco Mexico (17-27 Mar)		
1st place, gold medalist(s)	Alberto Fernández (ESP)	45 EWR	1st place, gold medalist(s)	Ankur Mittal (IND)	75 EWR	1st place, gold medalist(s)	Marco Sablone (ITA)	55
2nd place, silver medalist(s)	Antonio Bailón (ESP)	42	2nd place, silver medalist(s)	James Willett (AUS)	73	2nd place, silver medalist(s)	Frank Thompson (USA)	53
3rd place, bronze medalist(s)	Aaron Heading (GBR)	32	3rd place, bronze medalist(s)	Qi Ying (CHN)	52	3rd place, bronze medalist(s)	Paul Adams (AUS)	43
Larnaca Cyprus (28 Apr-8 May)			Larnaca Cyprus (28 Apr-8 May)			Larnaca Cyprus (28 Apr-8 May)		
1st place, gold medalist(s)	Antonio Bailón (ESP)	46 WR	1st place, gold medalist(s)	Daniele Di Spigno (ITA)	78 WR	1st place, gold medalist(s)	Federico Gil (ARG)	56
2nd place, silver medalist(s)	Giovanni Cernogoraz (CRO)	43	2nd place, silver medalist(s)	Artem Nekrasov (RUS)	72	2nd place, silver medalist(s)	Georgios Achilleos (CYP)	55
3rd place, bronze medalist(s)	Alexey Alipov (RUS)	31	3rd place, bronze medalist(s)	Davide Gasparini (ITA)	56	3rd place, bronze medalist(s)	Alexander Zemlin (RUS)	44
Final- New Delhi India (23-30 Oct)			Final- New Delhi India (23-30 Oct)			Final- New Delhi India (23-30 Oct)		
1st place, gold medalist(s)	Alberto Fernández (ESP)	48 WR	1st place, gold medalist(s)	Hu Binyuan (CHN)	79 WR	1st place, gold medalist(s)	Riccardo Filippelli (ITA)	59 WR
2nd place, silver medalist(s)	Daniele Resca (ITA)	46	2nd place, silver medalist(s)	Sangram Dahiya (IND)	76	2nd place, silver medalist(s)	Ben Llewellin (GBR)	59 WR
3rd place, bronze medalist(s)	Giovanni Cernogoraz (CRO)	37	3rd place, bronze medalist(s)	Davide Gasparini (ITA)	56	3rd place, bronze medalist(s)	Federico Gil (ARG)	49

== Women's results ==
=== Rifle events ===
50 metre rifle three positions			10 metre air rifle		
New Delhi India (22 Feb-04 Mar)			New Delhi India (22 Feb-04 Mar)		
1st place, gold medalist(s)	Zhang Yiwen (CHN)	455.7	1st place, gold medalist(s)	Shi Mengyao (CHN)	252.1 WR, WRJ
2nd place, silver medalist(s)	Jasmine Ser (SIN)	453.8	2nd place, silver medalist(s)	Dong Lijie (CHN)	248.9
3rd place, bronze medalist(s)	Eva Rösken (GER)	443.6	3rd place, bronze medalist(s)	Pooja Ghatkar (IND)	228.8
Munich Germany (17-24 May)			Munich Germany (17-24 May)		
1st place, gold medalist(s)	Snježana Pejčić (CRO)	462.2	1st place, gold medalist(s)	Laura-Georgeta Coman (ROU)	250.2
2nd place, silver medalist(s)	Selina Gschwandtner (GER)	455.4	2nd place, silver medalist(s)	Gabriela Vognarova (CZE)	246.5
3rd place, bronze medalist(s)	Jolyn Beer (GER)	444.6	3rd place, bronze medalist(s)	Armina Sadeghian (IRI)	227.1
Gabala Azerbaijan (06-14 June)			Gabala Azerbaijan (06-14 June)		
1st place, gold medalist(s)	Shi Mengyao (CHN)	459.0 WRJ	1st place, gold medalist(s)	Peng Xinyi (CHN)	248.1 S-off: 9.9
2nd place, silver medalist(s)	Nadine Ungerank (AUT)	455.2	2nd place, silver medalist(s)	Shi Mengyao (CHN)	248.1 S-off: 9.5
3rd place, bronze medalist(s)	Stine Nielsen (DEN)	444.9	3rd place, bronze medalist(s)	Jasmine Ser (SIN)	225.7
Final- New Delhi India (23-30 Oct)			Final- New Delhi India (23-30 Oct)		
1st place, gold medalist(s)	Jolyn Beer (GER)	459.9	1st place, gold medalist(s)	Andrea Arsovic (SRB)	251.3
2nd place, silver medalist(s)	Snježana Pejčić (CRO)	457.5	2nd place, silver medalist(s)	Laura-Georgeta Coman (ROU)	249.7
3rd place, bronze medalist(s)	Zhang Yiwen (CHN)	448.2 SO	3rd place, bronze medalist(s)	Peng Xinyi (CHN)	228.5

=== Pistol events ===
25 metre pistol			10 metre air pistol		
New Delhi India (22 Feb-04 Mar)			New Delhi India (22 Feb-04 Mar)		
1st place, gold medalist(s)	Naphaswan Yangpaiboon (THA)	38	1st place, gold medalist(s)	Lin Yuemei (CHN)	240.8
2nd place, silver medalist(s)	Zhang Jingjing (CHN)	30	2nd place, silver medalist(s)	Zhang Mengxue (CHN)	237.8
3rd place, bronze medalist(s)	Michelle Skeries (GER)	27	3rd place, bronze medalist(s)	Teo Shun Xie (SIN)	217.4
Munich Germany (17-24 May)			Munich Germany (17-24 May)		
1st place, gold medalist(s)	Zhang Jingjing (CHN)	36	1st place, gold medalist(s)	Anna Korakaki (GRE)	241.2
2nd place, silver medalist(s)	Antoaneta Boneva (BUL)	34	2nd place, silver medalist(s)	Olena Kostevych (UKR)	238.3
3rd place, bronze medalist(s)	Anna Korakaki (GRE)	26	3rd place, bronze medalist(s)	Lin Yuemei (CHN)	217.5
Gabala Azerbaijan (06-14 June)			Gabala Azerbaijan (06-14 June)		
1st place, gold medalist(s)	Lin Yuemei (CHN)	36	1st place, gold medalist(s)	Sylvia Steiner (AUT)	237.5
2nd place, silver medalist(s)	Kim Min-jung (KOR)	34	2nd place, silver medalist(s)	Vitalina Batsarashkina (RUS)	236.1
3rd place, bronze medalist(s)	Zhang Jingjing (CHN)	27	3rd place, bronze medalist(s)	Alejandra Zavala Vázquez (MEX)	216.7
Final- New Delhi India (23-30 Oct)			Final- New Delhi India (23-30 Oct)		
1st place, gold medalist(s)	Kim Min-jung (KOR)	34 S-off 5	1st place, gold medalist(s)	Céline Goberville (FRA)	240.9
2nd place, silver medalist(s)	Zhang Jingjing (CHN)	34 S-off 3	2nd place, silver medalist(s)	Lin Yuemei (CHN)	237.0
3rd place, bronze medalist(s)	Zorana Arunović (SRB)	30 SO	3rd place, bronze medalist(s)	Zhang Mengxue (CHN)	218.7

=== Shotgun events ===
Trap			Skeet		
New Delhi India (22 Feb-04 Mar)			New Delhi India (22 Feb-04 Mar)		
1st place, gold medalist(s)	Penny Smith (AUS)	40 WR	1st place, gold medalist(s)	Kimberly Rhode (USA)	56 WR
2nd place, silver medalist(s)	Jessica Rossi (ITA)	38	2nd place, silver medalist(s)	Sutiya Jiewchaloemmit (THA)	51
3rd place, bronze medalist(s)	Mopsi Veromaa (FIN)	27	3rd place, bronze medalist(s)	Chloe Tipple (NZL)	42
Acapulco Mexico (17-27 Mar)			Acapulco Mexico (17-27 Mar)		
1st place, gold medalist(s)	Ashley Carroll (USA)	42 S-off 1 WR	1st place, gold medalist(s)	Kimberly Rhode (USA)	54
2nd place, silver medalist(s)	Natalie Rooney (NZL)	42 S-off 0 WR	2nd place, silver medalist(s)	Caitlin Connor (USA)	53
3rd place, bronze medalist(s)	Alessandra Perilli (SMR)	30	3rd place, bronze medalist(s)	Cao Yi (CHN)	41
Larnaca Cyprus (28 Apr-8 May)			Larnaca Cyprus (28 Apr-8 May)		
1st place, gold medalist(s)	Wang Xiaojing (CHN)	45 WR	1st place, gold medalist(s)	Wei Meng (CHN)	54
2nd place, silver medalist(s)	Ray Bassil (LBN)	42	2nd place, silver medalist(s)	Kimberly Rhode (USA)	52
3rd place, bronze medalist(s)	Alessandra Perilli (SMR)	33	3rd place, bronze medalist(s)	Sutiya Jiewchaloemmit (THA)	41
Final- New Delhi India (23-30 Oct)			Final- New Delhi India (23-30 Oct)		
1st place, gold medalist(s)	Alessia Iezzi (ITA)	41, S-off: 2	1st place, gold medalist(s)	Kimberly Rhode (USA)	56 EWR, S-off: 22
2nd place, silver medalist(s)	Fatima Galvez (ESP)	41, S-off: 1	2nd place, silver medalist(s)	Diana Bacosi (ITA)	56 EWR, S-off: 21
3rd place, bronze medalist(s)	Ray Bassil (LBN)	32	3rd place, bronze medalist(s)	Dania Jo Vizzi (USA)	44

== Mixed events ==
10 meter air rifle			10 meter air pistol			Trap		
New Delhi India (24 October)			New Delhi India (24 October)			New Delhi India (24 October)		
1st place, gold medalist(s)	Wu Mingyang (CHN); Song Buhan (CHN)	499.8	1st place, gold medalist(s)	Heena Sidhu (IND); Jitu Rai (IND)	483.4	1st place, gold medalist(s)	Antonio Bailón (ESP); Beatriz Martinez (ESP)	42
2nd place, silver medalist(s)	Andrea Arsović (SRB); Milutin Stefanović (SRB)	496.8	2nd place, silver medalist(s)	Céline Goberville (FRA); Florian Fouquet (FRA)	481.1	2nd place, silver medalist(s)	Giovanni Pellielo (ITA); Jessica Rossi (ITA)	40
3rd place, bronze medalist(s)	Sui Gengcheng (CHN); Shi Mengyao (CHN)	430.3	3rd place, bronze medalist(s)	Cai Xiaoxue (CHN); Yang Wei (CHN)	418.2	3rd place, bronze medalist(s)	Derek Haldeman (USA); Ashley Carroll (USA)	31

== Overall medal table ==
Rank	Nation	Gold	Silver	Bronze	Total
1	China	15	12	10	37
2	Italy	6	6	3	15
3	United States	5	3	2	10
4	France	4	3	0	7
5	Spain	4	2	1	7
6	India	3	3	3	9
7	Japan	3	2	1	6
8	South Korea	3	1	3	7
8	Serbia	3	1	3	7
10	Ukraine	2	3	2	7
11	Germany	2	2	4	8
12	Hungary	2	1	3	6
13	Australia	2	1	2	5
14	Denmark	2	0	1	3
15	Russia	1	4	2	7
15	Croatia	1	2	1	4
17	Austria	1	1	1	3
17	Thailand	1	1	1	3
19	Romania	1	1	0	2
20	Greece	1	0	1	2
20	Argentina	1	0	1	2
22	Belarus	0	2	1	3
23	Czech Republic	0	2	0	2
24	Great Britain	0	1	2	3
24	Singapore	0	1	2	3
26	New Zealand	0	1	1	2
26	Lebanon	0	1	1	2
28	Bulgaria	0	1	0	1
28	Cyprus	0	1	0	1
28	Norway	0	1	0	1
28	Portugal	0	1	0	1
28	Turkey	0	1	0	1
28	Vietnam	0	1	0	1
34	Iran	0	0	2	2
34	Poland	0	0	2	2
34	San Marino	0	0	2	2
37	Azerbaijan	0	0	1	1
37	Belgium	0	0	1	1
37	Finland	0	0	1	1
37	Mexico	0	0	1	1
37	Switzerland	0	0	1	1
Total	41	63	63	63	189
