= Zicheng =

Zicheng could refer to:

- Cao Zicheng (Chinese: 曹子乘), Chinese warlord
- Hong Zicheng (Chinese: 洪自诚), Chinese philosopher
- Huang Zicheng (Chinese: 黃子澄), Chinese official
- Hui Zicheng (Chinese: 惠 子程; born 1989), Chinese sports shooter
- Li Zicheng (Chinese: 李自成; 1606–1645), Chinese rebel
- Li Zicheng (politician, born 1959) (Chinese: 李自成; born 1959), Chinese mayor
- Li Zicheng (runner) (born 1990), Chinese runner
- Liang Zicheng (Chinese: 梁子成; born 1982), Chinese football striker
- Zicheng Liu, researcher at Microsoft Research
- Zeng Zicheng (Chinese: 曾子城), Chinese statesman and military general
