= Joshua Richmond =

American sport shooter

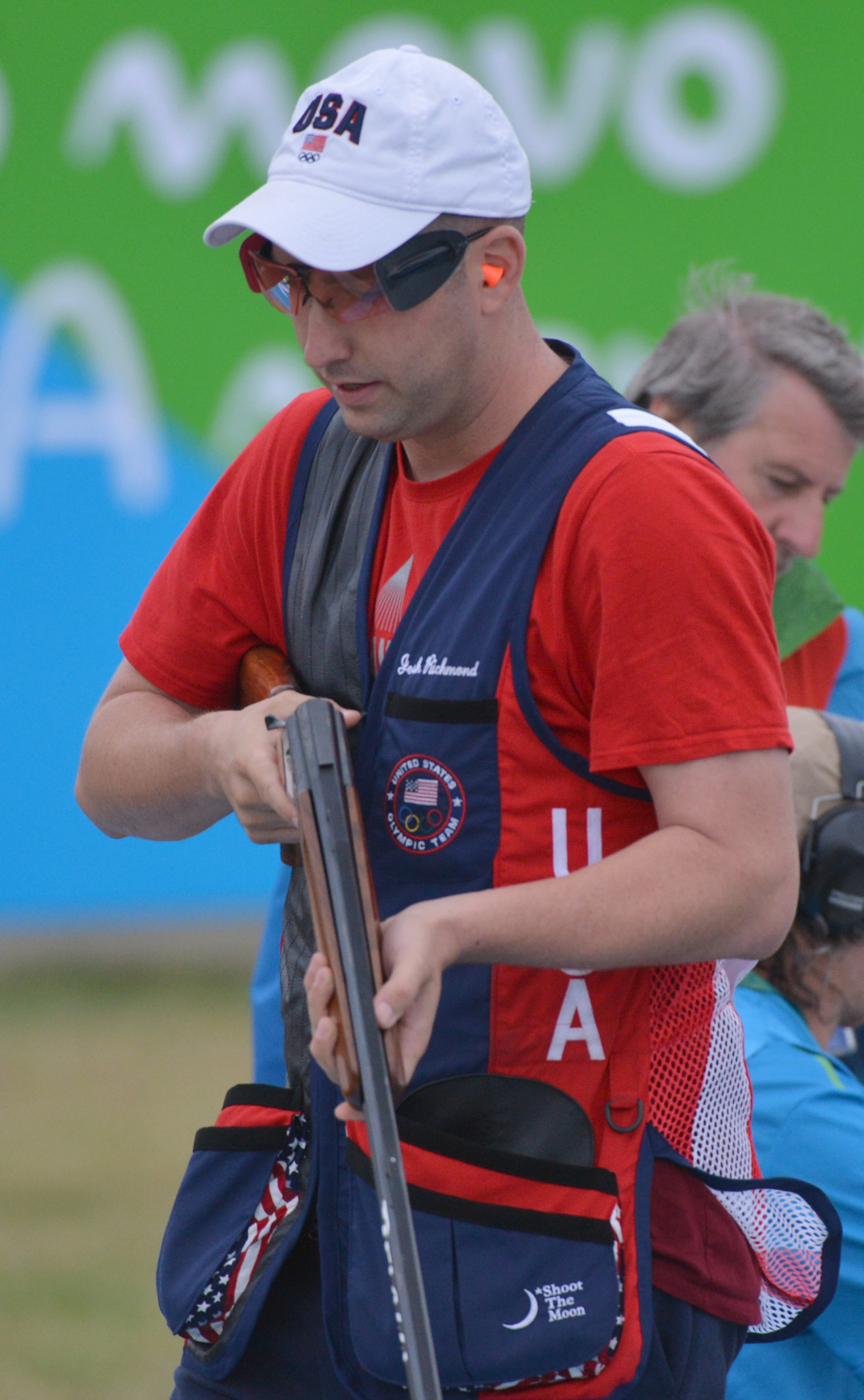
- Richmond at the 2016 Olympics

Personal information
- Born: December 19, 1985 (age 40) Sayre, Pennsylvania, U.S.
- Height: 188 cm (6 ft 2 in)
- Weight: 91 kg (201 lb)

Sport
- Sport: Trap shooting
- Event: Double trap
- Club: U.S. Army Marksmanship Unit, Fort Benning, Georgia
Medal record
Representing the United States
Pan American Games
Gold medal – first place	2007 Rio de Janeiro	Double trap
Double trap world championships
Gold medal – first place	2006 Zagreb	Team
Bronze medal – third place	2007 Nicosia	Individual
Gold medal – first place	2009 Maribor	Team
Gold medal – first place	2010 Munich	Individual
Gold medal – first place	2010 Munich	Team
Gold medal – first place	2014 Ganada	Individual

Joshua Richmond (born December 19, 1985) is an American male sport shooter who was, at one time, the world's top ranked double trap shooter. He won the ISSF World Shooting Championships in 2010 and 2014, and also has 12 ISSF World Cup medals in the sport. He was favored to win the men's double trap shooting event at the 2012 Summer Olympics, but placed 16th.

Richmond was born in Sayre, Pennsylvania to Michael and Sandra Richmond. He attended Sullivan County High School and Troy State University and resides in Hillsgrove, Pennsylvania. He has a brother, Justin, wife Scharri, and two sons, Tristan and Beaux. In 2011 he was deployed to Afghanistan and earned the Army Commendation Medal, Afghanistan Campaign Medal, National Defense Service Medal, Global War on Terrorism Service Medal, Army Service Ribbon, U.S. International Distinguished Badge and the Grenade Marksmanship Badge.

With the removal of double trap from the Olympics, Josh has transitioned into shooting international trap.

== Performance History ==
=== Double Trap ===
	2005	2006	2007	2008	2009	2010	2011	2012	2013	2014	2015	2016
Olympic Games	Not held			—	Not held			16th 131	Not held			7th 135
World Championships	(gold) Gold; 132 (J)	6th 141+44	(bronze) Bronze; 143+46	—	5th 143+40	(gold) Gold; 146+50	19th 143	—	—	(gold) Gold; 143(30)+30	—	—
Pan American Games / CAT	(gold) Gold; 136+47	—	(gold) Gold; 138+47	—	—	—	—	—	—	6th 143(25)	—	—
World Cup 1	—	27th 124	4th 140+46	6th 139+42	—	(gold) Gold; 144+48	(bronze) Bronze; 143+46	(bronze) Bronze; 143+40	—	(silver) Silver; 138(29)+27	—	9th 135
World Cup 2	—	8th 135	—	14th 134	(gold) Gold; 145+43	—	(silver) Silver; 140+46	—	—	(silver) Silver; 138(28)+28	—	7th 136
World Cup 3	—	—	(gold) Gold; 142+49	—	5th 141+47	4th 143+45	—	(gold) Gold; 144+49	30th 122	29th 137	—	(gold) Gold; 140(28)+29
World Cup 4	4th 140+46	—	—	—	(bronze) Bronze; 142+48	12th 141	4th 145+47	Not held	—	—	—	10th 136
World Cup Final	—	—	9th 137	—	—	10th 138	—	(gold) Gold; 145+47	4th 140(29)+27	4th 143(29)+26	—	—
