= Li Zicheng (disambiguation) =

Li Zicheng may refer to:

- Li Zicheng, Chinese rebel leader who overthrew the Ming dynasty in 1644
- Li Zicheng (runner), Chinese athlete
- Li Zicheng (politician), Chinese politician serving as the deputy mayor of Huaihua, Hunan
