= João Costa (sport shooter) =

Portuguese sport shooter

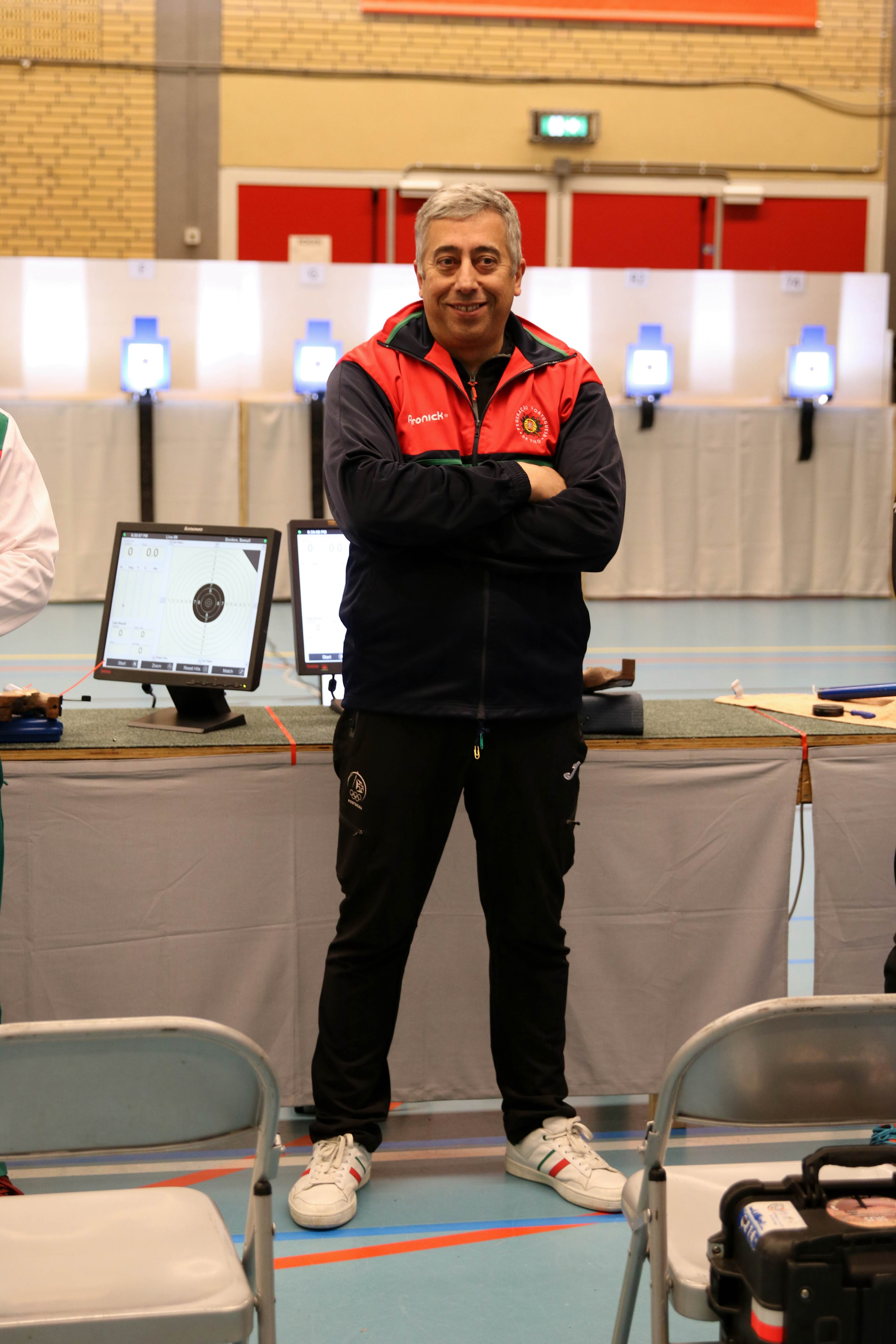

Medal record

Representing Portugal

Men's Shooting

ISSF World Shooting Championships
Silver medal – second place	2014 Granada	25m Standard pistol

MLAIC World Shooting Championships
Silver medal – second place	2022 Pforzheim	25m Pistol
Silver medal – second place	2022 Pforzheim	25m Revolver

European Games
Silver medal – second place	2015 Baku	10m air pistol

European Championships
Gold medal – first place	2009 Osijek	50m pistol
Gold medal – first place	2011 Belgrade	25m center fire pistol
Gold medal – first place	2015 Maribor	50m pistol
Gold medal – first place	2015 Arnhem	10m pistol mixed team
Gold medal – first place	2022 Wrocław	50m pistol open
Silver medal – second place	2013 Osijek	50m pistol
Bronze medal – third place	2003 Plzen	25m standard pistol
Bronze medal – third place	2003 Plzen	50m pistol
Bronze medal – third place	2003 Plzen	25m center fire pistol
Bronze medal – third place	2009 Osijek	25m center fire pistol
Bronze medal – third place	2011 Belgrade	50m pistol
Bronze medal – third place	2013 Osijek	25m standard pistol
Bronze medal – third place	2014 Moscow	10m air pistol
Bronze medal – third place	2018 Győr	10m air pistol
Bronze medal – third place	2021 Osijek	10m air pistol mixed

ISSF World Cup Final
Silver medal – second place	2009 Wuxi	50m pistol
Silver medal – second place	2015 Munich	10m Air pistol

ISSF World Cup
Gold medal – first place	2006 Munich	50m pistol
Gold medal – first place	2007 Munich	50m pistol
Gold medal – first place	2015 Munich	50m pistol
Gold medal – first place	2015 Munich	10m pistol
Silver medal – second place	2006 Guangzhou	50m pistol
Silver medal – second place	2006 Munich	10m pistol
Silver medal – second place	2011 Fort Benning	10m pistol
Silver medal – second place	2013 Granada	50m pistol
Silver medal – second place	2017 Munich	50 meter pistol
Bronze medal – third place	2001 Seoul	10m Air pistol
Bronze medal – third place	2002 Milan	10m Air pistol
Bronze medal – third place	2008 Milan	50m Air pistol
Bronze medal – third place	2013 Munich	10m Air pistol
Bronze medal – third place	2015 Fort Benning	10m Air pistol
Silver medal – second place	2014 Baku	10m Air pistol

João Carlos Calvete Pereira da Costa (born 28 October 1964 in Luanda) is a Portuguese marksman who competed at the 2000, 2004, 2008, 2012 and 2016 Summer Olympic Games representing Portugal.

Individual national champion more than 80 times and still active, having started to shoot federally in 1992.

Initially athlete of A.N.1º de Maio and since 2013 athlete of SCP.

Military by profession, João Costa is also a competitive shooter representing Portugal.

Federated since 1992, he is a master in Air Pistol, 50 meter Pistol, Center Fire Pistol, Standard Pistol, 9mm War Pistol, 9mm Sport Pistol, Black Powder Pistol and Black Powder Revolver.

João Costa won more than 80 national titles in the disciplines of Air Pistol (P10m), 50 meter Pistol (P50m), Center Fire Pistol (.32), Standard Pistol (.22), 9mm War Pistol and Black Powder Pistol, and obtained a large number of national records in the same disciplines. He is also a national record holder for teams in the modalities he practices.

Having made his first international appearance in 1996, João Costa has more than 100 presences in major international events in the sport, with emphasis on the presence in the Olympic Games:

- Sydney 2000: 7th (P10m) and 27th (P50m)

- Athens 2004: 12th (P50m) and 17th (P10m)

- Beijing 2008: 16th (P10m) and 32nd (P50m)

- London 2012: 7th (P10m) and 9th (P50m)

-Rio de Janeiro: 11th (P10) and 11th (P50m)

From the various participations in World Championships:

- Spain 2014: 2nd (Std p)

- Germany 2010: 5th (Std p) and 16th (P50m)

- Spain 2014: 9nd (CFP)

- Portugal 2010 (Black Powder): 4th (Kuchen)

- Barcelona 1998 9th (CFP)

From the more than 20 participations in European Championships:

- Gold Medal: Croatia 2009 and Slovenia 2015 (P50m) and Belgrade 2011 (CFP)

- Bronze Medal: Rep. Czech 2003 (P50m); Rep. Czech 2003 (PStdP); Rep. Czech 2003 (CFP); Croatia 2009 (CFP) and Belgrade 2011 (P50m)

Finally, in World Cup competitions:

- Silver Medal at the Cup Final in China in 2009 (P50m)

- Gold Medal: Munich 2006 (P50m) and Munich 2007 (P50m) Munich 2015 (P50m) Munich 2015 (P10m)

- Silver Medal: China 2006 (P50m); Munich 2006 (P10m) and United States 2011 (P10m)

- Bronze Medal: Cuba 1997 (P50m Teams); Korea 2001 (P10m); Italy 2002 (P10m) and Milan 2008 (P50m)

It is with this history that João Costa joins Sporting in 2013 after representing Naval 1º de Maio for 20 years.

On May 28, 2013, he won the bronze medal in the 10-meter Compressed Air Pistol at the Munich World Cup, achieving a total of 176.9 points. In the same event, on 26 May, he had been 4th in the 50 meter pistol.

João Costa, won on July 7, 2013, the silver medal in Free Pistol 50 meters in the World Cup in Granada - Spain.

At the European Championship held in Osijek, Croatia, João Costa won the silver medal in the 50-meter Free Pistol on July 27, 2013, and the bronze medal in the Standard 25-meter Pistol on August 1, 2013.

On September 29, 2013, João Costa won the gold medal in the Standard 25-meter Pistol, in the European Cup stage held in Saint Jean de Marsacq, France.

In the national air championships, in December 2013, João Costa achieved his 56th national title in Pistol, which makes him the Portuguese with the most national titles won.(all sports)

João Costa won the bronze medal in Pistol on March 5, 2014, at the 10 m Air European Championship, which took place in Moscow.

In May 2014, during the IV Ibero-American Shooting Sport Championship, in Buenos Aires, Argentina, João Costa won 1st place in 50m Free Pistol, with 193.9 points and 1st place in 10m Pistol, with 202,3 points.

In July 2014, in the national championships, he won the individual title in Standard Pistol (StdP) and was part of the team that gave Sporting the team titles in Standard Pistol (StdP) and Center Fire Pistol (CFP).

On September 16, 2014, João Costa won the silver medal in the 25-meter standard pistol event of the World Shooting Championship, held in Granada, Spain. The Sporting shooter added up to 577 points, four less than the Turkish Yusuf Dikec, who became world champion.

On October 12, 2014, in Bordeaux, João Costa finished the European Cup final in 2nd place in the 25m Standard Pistol with a total of 566 points, three less than the first, Paal Hembre from Norway.

On March 7, 2015, João Costa, teaming up with Joana Castelão, won the gold medal in the AIR 50 Pistol event, at the European Air Shooting Championships, held in Arnhem, Holland.

On May 18, 2015, at the World Cup stage held in Fort Benning in the United States, João Costa won the bronze medal in the 10m pistol event, with this result, the Sporting shooter also guaranteed an Olympic spot for Portugal.

In the World Cup stage in Munich, João Costa won the gold medal in the 50m Pistol event with 194.7 points, beating the Chinese Bowen Zhang and the Japanese Tomoyuki Matsuda, on Friday 29 May 2015. On Sunday 31, but now in the 10m Pistol discipline, the leonine shooter took another gold medal with 201.4 points, ahead of Matsuda and Sun Yang.

On June 17, 2015, João Costa won the silver medal in the 10m Pistol final of the I European Games, held in Baku, Azerbaijan. The Sporting shooter scored 201.5 points, only being beaten by Serbian Damir Mikec, who scored 201.8. The bronze medal went to Slovak Juraj Tuzinksy.

On July 25, 2015, João Costa won the title of European champion in the 50m Pistol discipline, at the European Championship held in Maribor, Slovenia. The 'SPC' athlete, who had qualified for the final in 7th place, with 554 points, won the Olympic final with 188.8 points.

On September 5, 2015, João Costa was second in the World Shooting Cup final, in the 10m Pistol category, a competition held in Munich, Germany.

On September 27, 2015, João Costa with 570 points, was second in the final of the European Cup 25m, in standard pistol, which took place in Bordeaux, France.

On June 4, 2016, in the national championships, he won the individual title in the 50m Pistol and was part of the team that gave Sporting that same title collectively.

On July 2, 2016, in the national championships, he won the individual title in Standard Pistol and was part of the team that gave Sporting that same title collectively.

At the 2016 Rio de Janeiro Olympic Games, João Costa was ranked 11th among 46 shooters in the 10 m Air Pistol with 578 points, just two away from having qualified for the final. In P50 m, with 554 points, João Costa qualified again in 11th place, this time among 41 shooters and again within two points of access to the final.

On December 3, 2016, João Costa was once again National Champion of 10m Air Pistol, also being part of the team that won the collective title for Sporting.

In the World Cup competition held in Munich from 17 to 24 May 2017, João Costa won the silver medal in the 50-meter Pistol discipline.

On May 28, 2017, at the 50 m National Championship, held in the Lisboa Shooting Center, João Costa became National Champion and was one tenth away from equaling the World Record in Finals. Collectively, he was part of the Senior Men's team that won the 6th National P50m Championship in Sporting's History.

On 10 and 11 June, the National Championships of Standard Pistol and Central Fire Pistol were disputed, and João Costa became National Champion in both disciplines. In collective terms, he was part of the Senior Men's team that won the National Standard Pistol Championship for Sporting.

At the 5th Iberoamerican Shooting Championship, which took place in El Salvador from June 20 to 28, 2017, João Costa won the 50-meter pistol and 10-meter pistol titles. In the same competition, on June 23, João Costa beat the world record score in the final of the 10 m Pistol event. The SPC shooter, who qualified in 1st place in the qualifying round with 574 points, won the race with 242.3 points in the Olympic final, scoring better than the world record then held by German Christian Reitz with 241.6 points. However, this result could not be homologated as a world record, since it can only be obtained in events of the Olympic Games, World Championships, World Cups, World Cup Finals, Continental Championships and Continental Games.

At the European Historical Muzzleloaders Shooting Championship, which took place in Las Gabias, Spain, from 3 to 9 September 2017, João Costa won the bronze medal in the Kuchenreuter (25m) event with a total of 96 points.

In the 25-meter Standard Pistol European Cup Final, which was held in Karlstad, Sweden from 15 to 17 September 2017, João Costa won first place with a record of 573 points.

On December 2 and 3, 2017, at the 10-meter Air Pistol National Championship, which took place in the National Stadium Shooting Range (Lisboa), João Costa became National Champion in Men, individually and collectively by the Sporting team.

On February 24, 2018, João Costa won the bronze medal in Air Pistol at the European 10-meter Shooting Championship, which took place in Gyor, Hungary, with 218.8 points in the final.

On June 16, 2018, João Costa became National Champion of Standard Pistol, also integrating the Sporting team that achieved the absolute title for teams. The following day, the Sporting shooter won the title of National Champion of Central Fire Pistol.

He won the bronze medal in the 10-meter Air Pistol with the Flag of Portugal at the 2018 Mediterranean Games, held in Tarragona, Spain, from 22 June to 1 July, with 217 points.

He was awarded the (SPC) Stromp award in the "European" category in 2013, 2018 and 2021 in the "World" category in 2014, 2022 and in the "Athlete" category in 2015.

In August 2022 in Pforzheim, Germany, won two silver medals in MLAIC World championships. Individual Pistol and Revolver.

Awards

Stromp Award 2013, 2014, 2015, 2018, 2021 and 2022

CNID Award - Athlete of the Year 2014

Sport Confederation of Portugal – 2009;2011;

Medal of Sports Merit Figueira da Foz 2001

Jornal de Coimbra athlete of the year and career award 2011-2012
