= Corey Cogdell =

American trapshooter

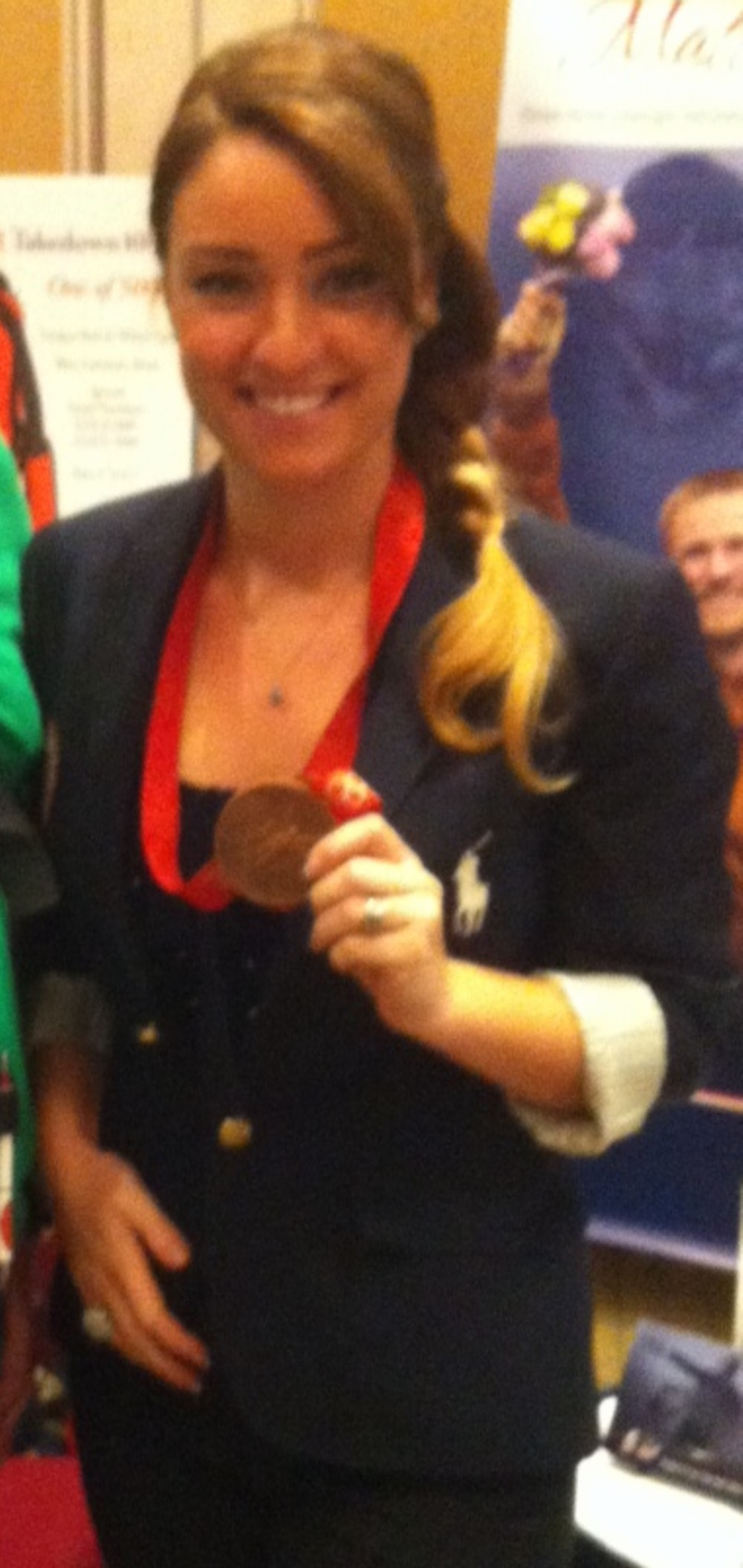
- Cogdell at the 2013 Shot Show in Las Vegas, Nevada

Personal information
- Born: September 2, 1986 (age 39) Palmer, Alaska, U.S.
- Spouse: Mitch Unrein

Sport
- Country: United States of America
- Sport: Shooting
- Event: Women's Trap
Medal record
Women's Shooting
Representing the United States
Olympic Games
Bronze medal – third place	2008 Beijing	Women's trap
Bronze medal – third place	2016 Rio de Janeiro	Women's trap
Pan American Games
Bronze medal – third place	2007 Rio de Janeiro	Women's Trap
ISSF World Cup Final
Bronze medal – third place	2016 Rome	Women's Trap
ISSF World Cup
Gold medal – first place	2012 Tucson	Women's Trap
Gold medal – first place	2015 Acapulco	Women's Trap
Gold medal – first place	2018 Tucson	Trap Mixed Team
Silver medal – second place	2010 Acapulco	Women's Trap
Silver medal – second place	2016 San Marino	Women's Trap
Bronze medal – third place	2007 Changwon	Women's Trap
Bronze medal – third place	2013 Granada	Women's Trap
Bronze medal – third place	2015 Gabala	Women's Trap
Championship of the Americas
Gold medal – first place	2010 Rio de Janeiro	Women's Trap
U.S. National Shooting Championship
Gold medal – first place	2009 National Championship	Women's Trap
Bronze medal – third place	2007 National Championship	Women's Trap
Bronze medal – third place	2010 National Championship	Women's Trap

Corey Cogdell (born September 2, 1986) is an American trapshooter. She is a two-time Olympic bronze medal winner in the Women's Trap; at the 2008 Summer Olympics and the 2016 Summer Olympics. She has won eight ISSF World Cup medals and a bronze medal at the 2007 Pan American Games. Cogdell also competed at the 2012 Summer Olympics.

== Career results ==
Olympic results
Event	2008	2012	2016
Trap	(bronze) Bronze; 69+17	11th 68	(bronze) Bronze; 68+13

== Career ==
Corey made the National Development Team in 2006 at Fall Selection when she placed first in the junior women's trap competition. That same day, she made the National Team when her score also placed her third in the open women's trap competition. In 2007 Corey was living at the Olympic Training Center as a resident athlete.

Corey took a break from competition in 2014 following her marriage, returning in 2015 to win a gold medal and Olympic Quota place at the first World Cup event of the year in Acapulco.

In 2018, Corey won a World Cup gold medal with Casey Wallace in the Mixed Team Trap at the Tucson World Cup.

== Personal life ==
Cogdell is married to former NFL defensive tackle Mitch Unrein, whom she started dating in 2010.
