= Muncy Valley, Pennsylvania =

Unincorporated community in Pennsylvania, US

Coordinates: 41°20′33″N 76°35′07″W

- Unincorporated community
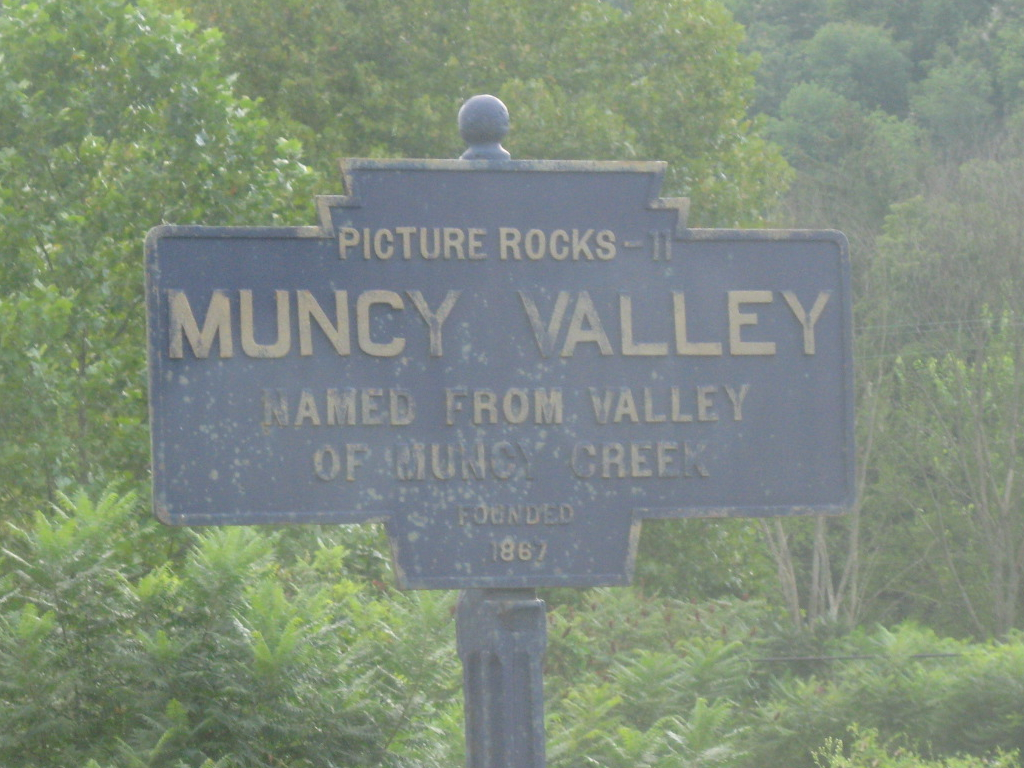
- Keystone Marker
- Interactive map of Muncy Valley, Pennsylvania
- Country: United States
- State: Pennsylvania
- County: Sullivan
- Time zone: UTC-5 (Eastern (EST))
  - Summer (DST): UTC-4 (EDT)
- ZIP code: 17758

Muncy Valley is an unincorporated community in Sullivan County, Pennsylvania, United States.

Muncy Valley is named after the valley of Muncy Creek. A tannery was constructed in Muncy Valley in 1867. It burned down in 1872, but was rebuilt. In 1893, the tannery was sold to the United States Leather Company. The village is served by the Muncy Valley Area Volunteer Fire Company.

== Notable person ==
- Morgan Craft, competitive shooter
