= Torben Grimmel =

Danish sports shooter (born 1975)

Personal information
- National team: Denmark
- Born: November 23, 1975 (age 50) Odder, Denmark
- Home town: Arhus, Denmark
- Occupations: Coach; Sport Shooter; Teacher
- Years active: 17
- Height: 183 cm (6 ft 0 in)
- Weight: 86 kg (190 lb)

Sport
- Country: Denmark
- Sport: Shooting sport
- Event: 50m Rifle Prone
- Coached by: Enrico Friedemann
- Retired: 2017

Achievements and titles
- Highest world ranking: 1
- Personal best: 632.0
Medal record
Men's shooting
Representing Denmark
Olympic Games
Silver medal – second place	2000 Sydney	50m rifle prone
ISSF World Cup Final
Gold medal – first place	2003 Milan	50m rifle prone
Silver medal – second place	2016 Bologna	50m rifle prone
Gold medal – first place	2017 New Delhi	50m rifle prone
European Championships
Gold medal – first place	1995 Zurich	50m rifle prone junior

Torben Grimmel (born 23 November 1975 in Odder) is a Danish sport shooter. Specialising in the ISSF 50m prone rifle event, Grimmel won the silver medal at the 2000 Summer Olympics. He was the European Junior Champion in 1995. As of 2023 he has won fourteen ISSF World Cup medals, and two ISSF World Cup finals.

== Shooting career ==
Grimmel started shooting in 1989, and began competing in 1990. His first international selection was for the 1992 European Junior Shooting Championships where he placed 5th in the Junior Men's Prone Rifle event.

In 1995 he was selected for the all-event European Shooting Championships in Zurich where he won the Junior Men's 50m Prone Rifle.

He competed in the 1996 Summer Olympics, the 2000 Summer Olympics, the 2004 Summer Olympics, the 2012 Summer Olympics and the 2016 Summer Olympics. He won the silver medal at the 2000 Summer Olympics.

Grimmel has won 14 medals at ISSF World Cups. In the ISSF World up Finals he has won two golds and a silver. In 2016 he dominated the World Cup circuit, winning three gold medals in four matches. He won Silver at the Final.
