= Sabrina Sena =

Italian sport shooter (born 1985)

Personal information
- Full name: Sabrina Sena
- Nationality: Italy
- Born: 14 March 1985 (age 41) Candela, Foggia, Italy
- Height: 1.59 m (5 ft 2 1/2 in)
- Weight: 60 kg (132 lb)

Sport
- Sport: Shooting
- Event(s): 10 m air rifle (AR40); 50 m rifle 3 positions (STR3X20)
- Club: Tiro a Segno Candela
- Coached by: Antonio Verlicchi
Medal record
Women's shooting
Representing Italy
European Championships (10 m)
Silver medal – second place	2015 Arnhem	AR40

Sabrina Sena (born 14 March 1985 in Candela, Foggia) is an Italian sport shooter. She has been selected to compete for Italy in rifle shooting at the 2004 Summer Olympics and has won a career total of three medals, one gold and two silver, in a major international competition, spanning the World Cup series and the European Championships. Sena is a member of her town's firing shooting range (Italian: Tiro a Segno Candela), and also, a resident athlete of the Italy national shooting team under Swiss-born rifle head coach and five-time Olympian Gabriele Bühlmann.

Sena's sporting debut came as the youngest member of the Italian shooting team (aged 19), when she qualified only for the women's 10 m air rifle at the 2004 Summer Olympics in Athens. She had registered a minimum qualifying score of 395 from her top finish at the European Junior Championships in Győr, Hungary, to fill out a quota place for the Games, after the Italian Union of Rifle Shooting (UITS) decided to exchange a spot in the air pistol, won by Caterina Padovan at the World Championships in Lahti, Finland, two years earlier, with the air rifle. Among the less experienced in the field, Sena demonstrated her best ability to score 390 out of a possible 400 points in the qualifying phase, which was enough for her to finish in thirty-second out of forty-four shooters.

In 2014, Sena came to prominence from an Olympic feat ten years earlier with her first gold medal victory over the rest of the field in the rifle three positions at the ISSF World Cup meet in Munich, Germany. The following year, she added a silver to her career tally in rifle shooting at the European Championships (10 m) in Arnhem, Netherlands, with 204.3, losing in a duel to Germany's Selina Gschwandtner by a 2.5-point margin.
