= Zicheng Liu =

American electrical engineer

Zicheng Liu from Microsoft Research, Redmond, WA was named Fellow of the Institute of Electrical and Electronics Engineers (IEEE) in 2015 for contributions to visual processing for multimedia interaction.
