= Pablo Carrera =

Spanish sport shooter

Pablo Carrera (born 2 August 1986, Bilbao, Spain) is a Spanish sport shooter who competes in the men's 10 metre air pistol and the 50 m pistol. At the 2012 Summer Olympics, he finished 4th in the qualifying round of the 10 metre air pistol, reaching the final with a score of 585. He finished 6th in the final round with a final score of 683.3. He also competed in the 50 m pistol, finishing in 22nd place.
