= Li Zicheng (politician, born 1959) =

Chinese politician

Li Zicheng (Chinese: 李自成; pinyin: Lǐ Zìchéng, born May 1959) is a Chinese politician serving as deputy mayor of the city of Huaihua, Hunan.

Li joined the Communist Party in 1986. From January 2013 to March 2013, Li served as both the deputy mayor of Huaihua and secretary of the Xupu Committee; he served exclusively as a deputy mayor of Huaihua beginning in March 2013. Investigations into allegations of bribery and sexual abuse by the Hunan Commission for Discipline Inspection led to his prosecution on March 8, 2016.
