= Morgan Craft =

American competitive shooter

Personal information
- Full name: Morgan Craft
- Nationality: United States
- Born: 11 May 1993 (age 33) Muncy Valley, Pennsylvania, United States
- Height: 1.65 m (5 ft 5 in)
- Weight: 60 kg (132 lb)

Sport
- Sport: Shooting
- Event: Skeet (SK75)
- Coached by: Craig Hancock
Medal record
Women's shooting
Representing the United States
World Championships
Gold medal – first place	2015 Lonato, Italy	SK75

Morgan Craft (born May 11, 1993, in Muncy Valley, Pennsylvania), is an American competitive shooter. A member of the U.S. national shooting team in the women's skeet, she competed at the 2015 World Shotgun Championships in Lonato, Italy. She scored higher than teammate Caitlin Connor for the gold medal and a spot to her first Olympic Games in a shoot-off with a score of 15–13.

Craft is currently ranked number one in the women's Olympic skeet.
