= Chen Dongqi =

Chinese sport shooter

Personal information
- Nationality: Chinese
- Born: 18 August 1988 (age 37) Chifeng, China

Sport
- Sport: Shooting
Medal record
Women's shooting
Representing China
Asian Championships
Gold medal – first place	2015 Kuwait City	50 m rifle 3 positions
Gold medal – first place	2015 Kuwait City	50 m rifle 3 positions team
Bronze medal – third place	2015 Kuwait City	50 m rifle prone team

Chen Dongqi is a Chinese sport shooter. She represents China at the 2020 Summer Olympics in Tokyo.
