= Anna Sergeevna Zhukova =

18th-century Russian writer and poet

- Born: Anna Sergeevna Buturlina
- Died: c. 1799
- Occupation: poet

Anna Sergeevna Zhukova (died 1799) was a Russian writer and poet who was one of the first female writers in Russia.

== Biography ==
Much of Zhukova's life is unknown, however it is known that she was the wife of Vasily Mikhailovich Zhukov. After the death of her husband in 1799, Zhukova went to the grave of her late son-in-law. During that trip, she fell ill, causing her to die later that year.

== Works ==
- Чувства матери (Feelings of a mother)
- Супругу моему, с коим я в разлуке», духовная ода (To my husband, from whom I am separated)
- Любовь (Love)
