= Sebastian Kuntschik =

Austrian sports shooter (born 1988)

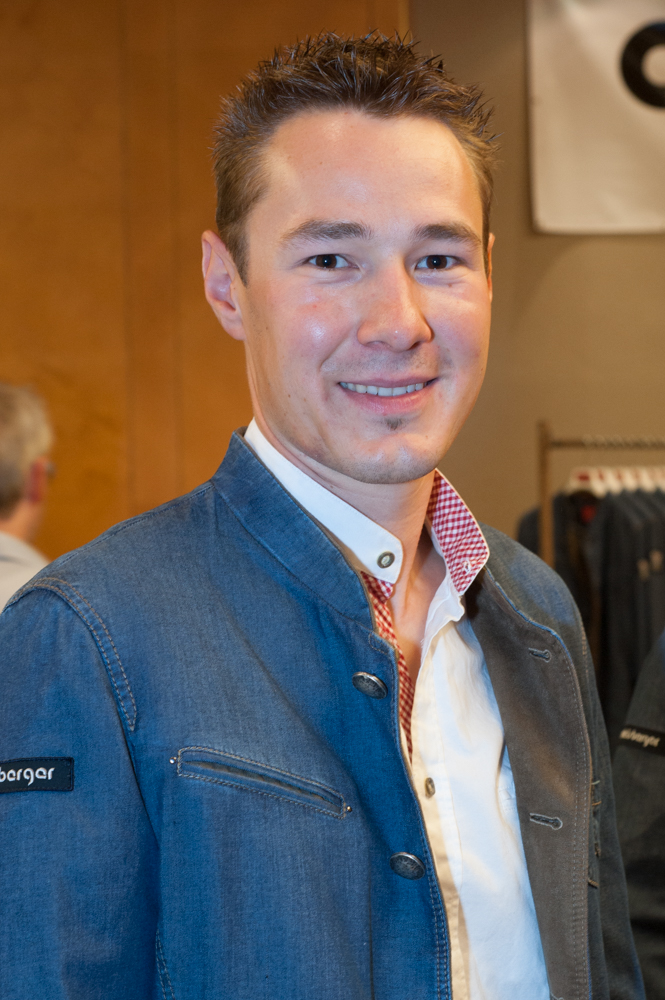
- Sebastian Kuntschik in 2016

Personal information
- Born: 23 September 1988 (age 37)

Sport
- Sport: Sports shooting

Sebastian Kuntschik (born 23 September 1988) is an Austrian sports shooter. He competed in the men's skeet event at the 2016 Summer Olympics.
