= Snježana Pejčić =

Croatian sport shooter (born 1982)

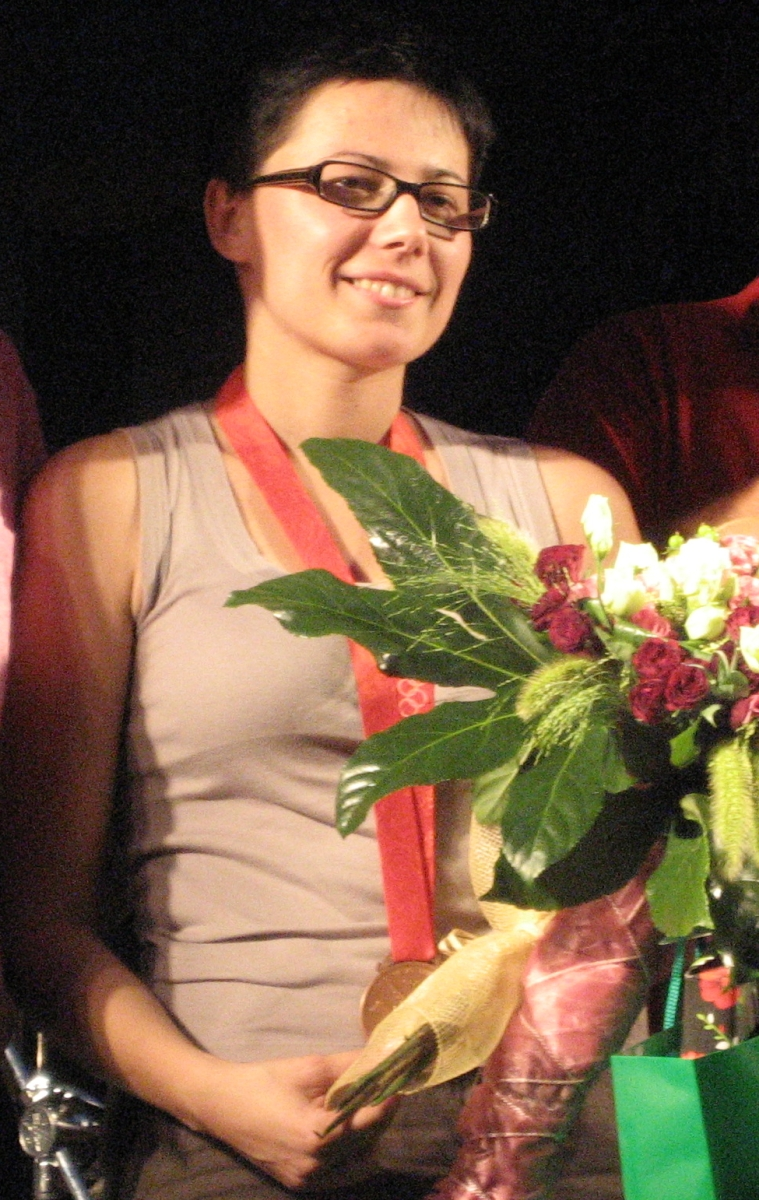

Personal information
- Nationality: Croatian
- Born: 25 January 1982 (age 44) Rijeka, SR Croatia, SFR Yugoslavia
- Height: 1.70 m (5 ft 7 in)
- Weight: 66 kg (146 lb)

Sport
- Country: Croatia
- Sport: Shooting
- Event: Air rifle
- Club: Lokomotiva
Medal record
Women's Shooting
Representing Croatia
Olympic Games
Bronze medal – third place	2008 Beijing	10 m air rifle
World Championships
Silver medal – second place	2014 Granada	50 m rifle 3 positions
Bronze medal – third place	2018 Changwon	50 m rifle 3 positions
European Championships
Gold medal – first place	2009 Prague	10 m air rifle
Gold medal – first place	2009 Prague	Team 10 m air rifle
Gold medal – first place	2017 Maribor	10 m air rifle
Silver medal – second place	2011 Brescia	Team 10 m air rifle
Silver medal – second place	2013 Osijek	50 m rifle 3 positions
Silver medal – second place	2015 Arnhem	Mixed team 10 m air rifle
Silver medal – second place	2017 Maribor	Team 10 m air rifle
Mediterranean Games
Gold medal – first place	2009 Pescara	50 m rifle 3 positions

Snježana Pejčić (born 13 July 1982) is a Croatian athlete who competes in shooting. Her first notable success was winning silver at the Juniors European Shooting Championship in Thessaloniki in 2002, and she won second place at an ISSF World Cup held in Munich in 2008. She took up sports shooting at the age of 15 and she is a member of Lokomotiva sport shooting club in Rijeka. Her greatest success came at the 2008 Summer Olympics where she earned a bronze medal.

== World records ==
	unrecognized result
=	equalization of world record

Discipline	F/Q	Result	Date and place
STR3X20	F	462.8	2015-01-28, Kuwait *
STR3X20	F	463.0	2015-04-12, Changwon
STR3X20	Q	= 592	2015-05-17, Fort Benning
STR3X20	Q	594	2016-04-22, Rio de Janeiro
R3X40	Q	1180	2018-04-26, Changwon

* unrecognized as WR due to insufficient number of countries entered
