= Henri Junghänel =

German sport shooter (born 1988)

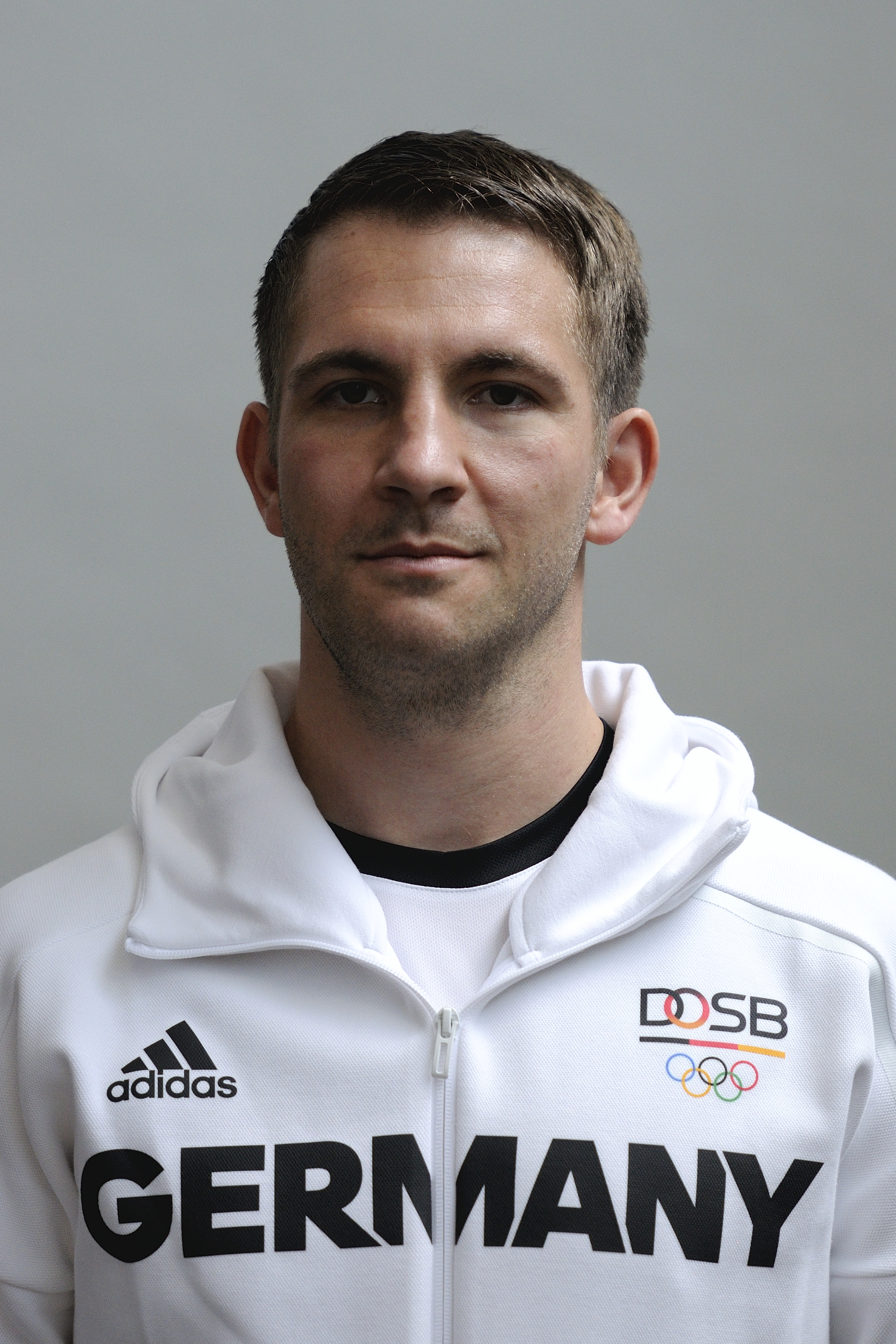
- Junghänel in 2016

Personal information
- Born: 5 February 1988 (age 38) Breuberg, Germany
- Height: 179 cm (5 ft 10 in)
- Weight: 80 kg (176 lb)

Sport
- Country: Germany
- Sport: Shooting
- Event: ISSF 50 meter rifle prone
- College team: University of Kentucky
Medal record
Olympic Games
Gold medal – first place	2016 Rio de Janeiro	50 m rifle prone
European Games
Gold medal – first place	2015 Baku	50 m rifle prone

Henri Junghänel (also spelled Junghaenel, born 5 February 1988) is a German shooter. He represented his country at the 2016 Summer Olympics, where he won the gold medal in the 50 metre rifle prone event.

He attended the University of Kentucky where he was a member of the Kentucky Wildcats rifle team and graduated in 2013 with a mechanical engineering degree.

== Olympic results ==
Event	2016
50 metre rifle prone	(gold) Gold; 627.8+209.5
