= Selina Gschwandtner =

German sports shooter

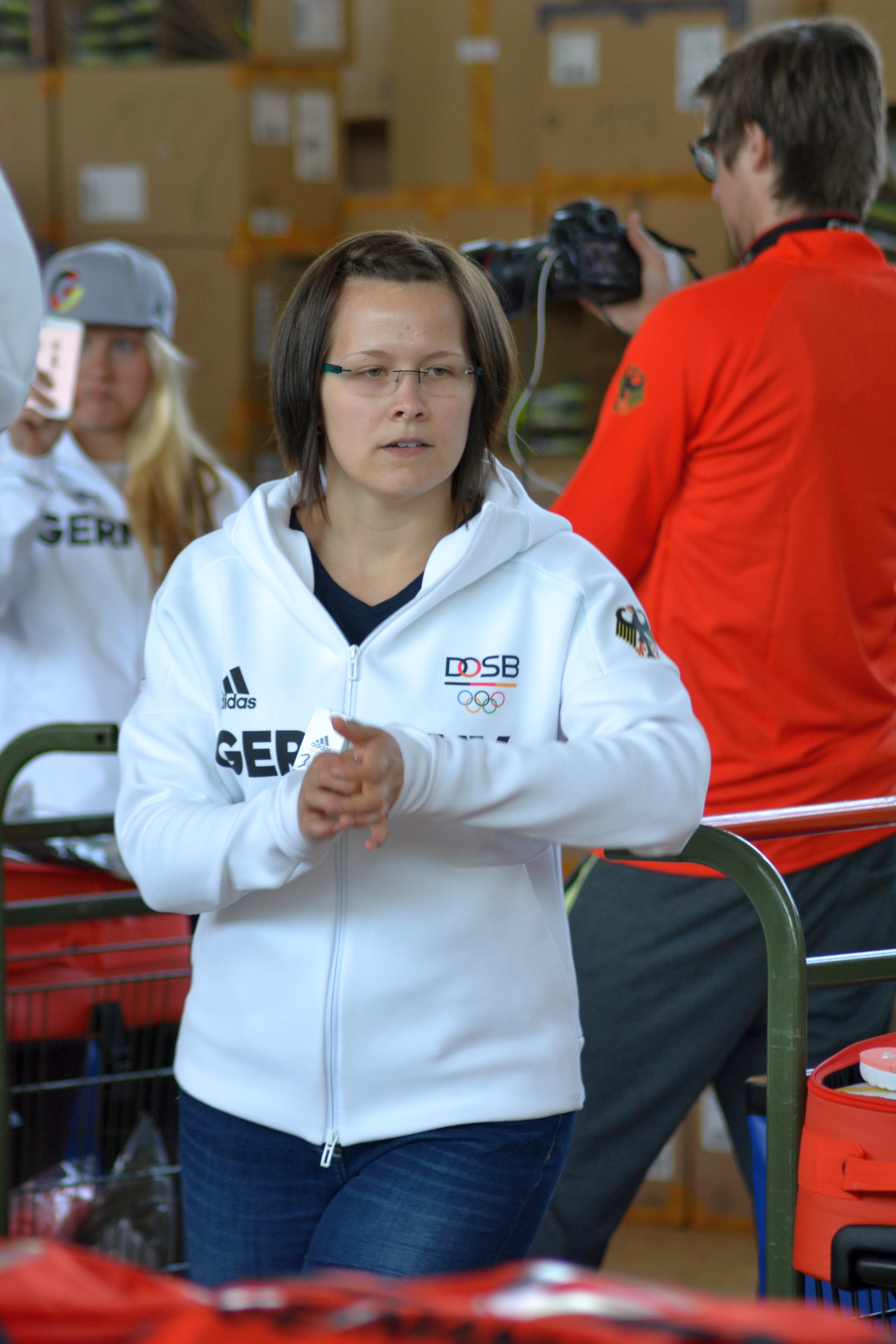
- Gschwandtner in 2016

Personal information
- Nationality: German
- Born: 18 May 1994 (age 32) Altötting, Bavaria, Germany
- Height: 1.66 m (5 ft 5 in)
- Weight: 64 kg (141 lb)

Sport
- Country: Germany
- Sport: Sports shooting
- Event: Air rifle
Medal record
World Championships
Bronze medal – third place	2018 Changwon	10 m team air rifle

Selina Gschwandtner (born 18 May 1994) is a German sports shooter. She competed in the women's 10 metre air rifle event at the 2016 Summer Olympics.
