= Zhang Jingjing =

Chinese sport shooter

Medal record

Women's shooting

Representing China

Asian Championships
Gold medal – first place	2012 Doha	25 m pistol team
Gold medal – first place	2015 Kuwait City	25 m pistol
Silver medal – second place	2012 Doha	25 m pistol
Silver medal – second place	2015 Kuwait City	25 m pistol team
Silver medal – second place	2019 Doha	25 m pistol team
Bronze medal – third place	2015 Kuwait City	10 m air pistol team
Bronze medal – third place	2019 Doha	25 m pistol

Zhang Jingjing (born December 3, 1988) is a Chinese sport shooter. She placed fourth in the women's 25 metre pistol event at the 2016 Summer Olympics. She also won the gold medal at the 2019 ISSF World Cup's women's 25-meter pistol competition.
