= Hui Zicheng =

Chinese sport shooter (born 1989)

Personal information
- Nationality: Chinese
- Born: 2 June 1989 (age 37)
- Height: 1.78 m (5 ft 10 in)
- Weight: 65 kg (143 lb)

Sport
- Country: China
- Sport: Sports shooting
- Event: Air rifle
Medal record
Men's shooting
Representing China
World Championships
Gold medal – first place	2018 Changwon	10 m air rifle team
Silver medal – second place	2018 Changwon	50 m rifle 3 positions team
Asian Championships
Silver medal – second place	2015 Kuwait City	50 m rifle 3 positions team
Bronze medal – third place	2015 Kuwait City	50 m rifle 3 positions

Hui Zicheng (Simplified Chinese:惠 子程, born 2 June 1989) is a Chinese sports shooter. He competed in the men's 50 metre rifle three positions event at the 2016 Summer Olympics.
