= ISSF World Cup =

By the International Shooting Sport Federation

The ISSF World Cup was introduced by the International Shooting Sport Federation in 1986 to provide a homogeneous system for qualification to the Olympic shooting competitions. It still is carried out in the Olympic shooting events, with four competitions per year in each event. For the best shooters there is since 1988 a World Cup Final.

== World Cup Final ==
The World Cup Final in rifle and pistol is often, but not always, held in Munich as the ISSF shooting season ending competition. The location and date of the World Cup Final in shotgun are more flexible. To the Final, the following shooters are qualified:

- The defending Olympic, World, ISSF World Cup Final champions.
- Silver and bronze medalists of either the last Olympic or the World Championship, whichever competition that was most recently held.
- The eight shooters that have made the best performances at the World Cup competitions during the year. For rating the performances, a special score system is used by taking into account of both the rank and the score achieved in the competitions.
- As many as two shooters can be nominated by the host country to compete in two of the World Cup Final events if no one from the host country qualifies.

== Editions ==
The venues are decided by the ISSF from time to time. However, some are more common than others. Two World Cups in rifle and pistol events are almost always held in Munich and Milan. The other two are usually held outside Europe, in places like Fort Benning, Buenos Aires, Seoul, Changwon or Sydney. Some common locations for the shotgun competitions are Nicosia, Lonato, New Delhi, and Americana, São Paulo. A new location for the shotgun competitions is held in Kerrville, Texas located in the Hill Country of Texas.

In Olympic years, an early World Cup is held at the Olympic venue and considered a Pre-Olympic test event.

=== Rifle and pistol ===
Cancelled due to COVID-19

N	Year	World Cup 1	World Cup 2	World Cup 3	World Cup 4	World Cup 5	World Cup 6	World Cup Final
1	1986	Mexico City (MEX)	Suhl (GDR)	Munich (FRG)	Zurich (SUI)	Bucharest (ROM)	Seoul (KOR)	
2	1987	Havana (CUB)	Mexico City (MEX)	Munich (FRG)	Suhl (GDR)	Zurich (SUI)	Seoul (KOR)	
3	1988	Mexico City (MEX)	Rio de Janeiro (BRA)	Suhl (GDR)	Munich (FRG)	Moscow (URS)		Munich (FRG)
4	1989	Mexico City (MEX)	Zagreb (YUG)	Suhl (GDR)	Munich (FRG)	Zurich (SUI)	Rio de Janeiro (BRA)	Munich (FRG)
5	1990	Mexico City (MEX)	Los Angeles (USA)	Suhl (GDR)	Munich (FRG)	Zurich (SUI)	Rio de Janeiro (BRA)	Munich (FRG)
6	1991	Mexico City (MEX)	Los Angeles (USA)	Seoul (KOR)	Zagreb (YUG)	Munich (GER)	Zurich (SUI)	Munich (GER)
7	1992	Mexico City (MEX)	Los Angeles (USA)	Suhl (GER)	Munich (GER)	Milan (ITA)		Munich (GER)
8	1993	Seoul (KOR)	Los Angeles (USA)	Munich (GER)	Milan (ITA)	Milan (ITA)		Munich (GER)
9	1994	Fort Benning (USA)	Havana (CUB)	Beijing (CHN)	Milan (ITA)	Barcelona (ESP)		Munich (GER)
10	1995	Havana (CUB)	Hiroshima (JPN)	Seoul (KOR)	Munich (GER)	Milan (ITA)		Munich (GER)
11	1996	Havana (CUB)	Atlanta (USA)	Munich (GER)	Milan (ITA)			Näfels (SUI)
12	1997	Havana (CUB)	Seoul (KOR)	Munich (GER)	Milan (ITA)			Lugano (SUI)
13	1998	Atlanta (USA)	Munich (GER)	Milan (ITA)	Buenos Aires (ARG)			Zurich (SUI)
14	1999	Seoul (KOR)	Munich (GER)	Milan (ITA)	Atlanta (USA)			Munich (GER)
15	2000	Sydney (AUS)	Milan (ITA)	Munich (GER)	Atlanta (USA)			Munich (GER)
16	2001	Atlanta (USA)	Seoul (KOR)	Milan (ITA)	Munich (GER)			Munich (GER)
17	2002	Sydney (AUS)	Shanghai (CHN)	Atlanta (USA)	Milan (ITA)			Munich (GER)
18	2003	Fort Benning (USA)	Zagreb (CRO)	Munich (GER)	Changwon (KOR)			Milan (ITA)
19	2004	Bangkok (THA)	Sydney (AUS)	Athens (GRE)	Milan (ITA)			Bangkok (THA)
20	2005	Changwon (KOR)	Fort Benning (USA)	Munich (GER)	Milan (ITA)			Munich (GER)
21	2006	Guangzhou (CHN)	Resende (BRA)	Munich (GER)	Milan (ITA)			Granada (ESP)
22	2007	Fort Benning (USA)	Sydney (AUS)	Bangkok (THA)	Munich (GER)			Bangkok (THA)
23	2008	Rio de Janeiro (BRA)	Beijing (CHN)	Munich (GER)	Milan (ITA)			Bangkok (THA)
24	2009	Changwon (KOR)	Beijing (CHN)	Munich (GER)	Milan (ITA)			Wuxi (CHN)
25	2010	Sydney (AUS)	Beijing (CHN)	Fort Benning (USA)	Belgrade (SRB)			Munich (GER)
26	2011	Sydney (AUS)	Changwon (KOR)	Fort Benning (USA)	Munich (GER)			Wrocław (POL)
27	2012	London (UK)	Milan (ITA)	Munich (GER)				Bangkok (THA)
28	2013	Changwon (KOR)	Fort Benning (USA)	Munich (GER)	Granada (ESP)			Munich (GER)
29	2014	Fort Benning (USA)	Munich (GER)	Maribor (SLO)	Beijing (CHN)			Gabala (AZE)
30	2015	Changwon (KOR)	Fort Benning (USA)	Munich (GER)	Gabala (AZE)			Munich (GER)
31	2016	Bangkok (THA)	Rio de Janeiro (BRA)	Munich (GER)	Baku (AZE)			Bologna (ITA)
32	2017	New Delhi (IND)	Munich (GER)	Gabala (AZE)				New Delhi (IND)
33	2018	Guadalajara (MEX)	Changwon (KOR)	Fort Benning (USA)	Munich (GER)			
34	2019	New Delhi (IND)	Beijing (CHN)	Munich (GER)	Rio de Janeiro (BRA)			Putian (CHN)
35	2020	New Delhi (IND)	Munich (GER)	Baku (AZE)				
36	2021	New Delhi (IND)	Changwon (KOR)	Osijek (CRO)				Wrocław (POL)
37	2022	Cairo (EGY)	Rio de Janeiro (BRA)	Baku (AZE)	Changwon (KOR)			
38	2023	Jakarta (INA)	Cairo (EGY)	Bhopal (IND)	Lima (PER)	Baku (AZE)	Rio de Janeiro (BRA)	Doha (QAT)
39	2024	Cairo (EGY)	Granada (ESP) (10m only)	Baku (AZE)	Munich (GER)			New Delhi (IND)
40	2025	Buenos Aires (ARG)	Lima (PER)	Munich (GER)	Ningbo (CHN)			Doha (QAT)
41	2026	Granada (ESP)	Munich (GER)	Hangzhou (CHN)	Cairo (EGY)			(Italy) Rome

=== Shotgun ===
Cancelled due to COVID-19

N	Year	World Cup 1	World Cup 2	World Cup 3	World Cup 4	World Cup 5	World Cup 6	World Cup Final
1	1986	Mexico City (MEX)	Montecatini (ITA)	Moscow (URS)	Suhl (GDR)	Seoul (KOR)		
2	1987	Havana (CUB)	Mexico City (MEX)	Montecatini (ITA)	Moscow (URS)	Seoul (KOR)		
3	1988	Mexico City (MEX)	Belo Horizonte (BRA)	Suhl (GDR)	Osijek (YUG)	Bologna (ITA)		Munich (FRG)
4	1989	Mexico City (MEX)	Suhl (GDR)	Osijek (YUG)	Tampere (FIN)	Tallinn (URS)		Munich (FRG)
5	1990	Mexico City (MEX)	Los Angeles (USA)	Bologna (ITA)	Suhl (GDR)	Weert (NED)		Munich (FRG)
6	1991	Mexico City (MEX)	Los Angeles (USA)	Lonato (ITA)	Seoul (KOR)	Cairo (EGY)		Munich (GER)
7	1992	Cairo (EGY)	Mexico City (MEX)	Los Angeles (USA)	Lonato (ITA)	Suhl (GER)		Munich (GER)
8	1993	Cairo (EGY)	Seoul (KOR)	Los Angeles (USA)	Suhl (GER)	Fagnano (ITA)		Munich (GER)
9	1994	Nicosia (CYP)	Cairo (EGY)	Havana (CUB)	Beijing (CHN)	Fagnano (ITA)		Munich (GER)
10	1995	Lima (PER)	Nicosia (CYP)	Seoul (KOR)	Chiba (JPN)	Lahti (FIN)		Munich (GER)
11	1996	Lima (PER)	Atlanta (USA)	Lonato (ITA)	Suhl (GER)			Montecatini Terme (ITA)
12	1997	New Delhi (IND)	Nicosia (CYP)	Lonato (ITA)	Seoul (KOR)	Brisbane (AUS)		Montecatini Terme (ITA)
13	1998	Cairo (EGY)	Brunei (BRU)	Atlanta (USA)	Lonato (ITA)			Montecatini Terme (ITA)
14	1999	Lima (PER)	Latsia (CYP)	Kumamoto (JPN)	Lonato (ITA)			Kuwait City (KUW)
15	2000	New Delhi (IND)	Sydney (AUS)	Cairo (EGY)	Lonato (ITA)			Nicosia (CYP)
16	2001	Nicosia (CYP)	Seoul (KOR)	Lonato (ITA)	Americana (BRA)			Doha (QAT) (early in 2002)
17	2002	Sydney (AUS)	Shanghai (CHN)	Suhl (GER)	Santo Domingo (DOM)			Lonato (ITA)
18	2003	Perth (AUS)	New Delhi (IND)	Granada (ESP)	Lonato (ITA)			Rome (ITA)
19	2004	Sydney (AUS)	Cairo (EGY)	Athens (GRE)	Americana (BRA)			Maribor (SLO)
20	2005	Changwon (KOR)	Rome (ITA)	Belgrade (SCG)	Americana (BRA)			Dubai (UAE)
21	2006	Qingyuan (CHN)	Kerrville (USA)	Cairo (EGY)	Suhl (GER)			Granada (ESP)
22	2007	Santo Domingo (DOM)	Changwon (KOR)	Lonato (ITA)	Maribor (SLO)			Belgrade (SRB)
23	2008	Beijing (CHN)	Kerrville (USA)	Suhl (GER)	Belgrade (SRB)			Minsk (BLR)
24	2009	Cairo (EGY)	Munich (GER)	Minsk (BLR)	San Marino (SMR)			Beijing (CHN)
25	2010	Acapulco (MEX)	Beijing (CHN)	Dorchester (GBR)	Lonato (ITA)			İzmir (TUR)
26	2011	Concepción (CHI)	Sydney (AUS)	Beijing (CHN)	Maribor (SLO)			Al Ain (UAE)
27	2012	Tucson (USA)	London (GBR)	Lonato (ITA)				Maribor (SLO)
28	2013	Acapulco (MEX)	Al Ain (UAE)	Nicosia (CYP)	Granada (ESP)			Abu Dhabi (UAE)
29	2014	Tucson (USA)	Almaty (KAZ)	Munich (GER)	Beijing (CHN)			Gabala (AZE)
30	2015	Acapulco (MEX)	Al Ain (UAE)	Larnaca (CYP)	Gabala (AZE)			Nicosia (CYP)
31	2016	Nicosia (CYP)	Rio de Janeiro (BRA)	San Marino (SMR)	Baku (AZE)			Rome (ITA)
32	2017	New Delhi (IND)	Acapulco (MEX)	Larnaca (CYP)				New Delhi (IND)
33	2018	Guadalajara (MEX)	Changwon (KOR)	Siġġiewi (MLT)	Tucson (USA)			
34	2019	Acapulco (MEX)	Al Ain (UAE)	Changwon (KOR)	Lahti (FIN)			Al Ain (UAE)
35	2020	Nicosia (CYP)	New Delhi (IND)	Baku (AZE)				
36	2021	Cairo (EGY)	New Delhi (IND)	Lonato (ITA)	Osijek (CRO)			Larnaca (CYP)
37	2022	Nicosia (CYP)	Lima (PER)	Lonato (ITA)	Baku (AZE)	Changwon (KOR)		
38	2023	Rabat (MAR)	Doha (QAT)	Larnaca (CYP)	Cairo (EGY)	Almaty (KAZ)	Lonato (ITA)	Doha (QAT)
39	2024	Cairo (EGY)	Rabat (MAR)	Baku (AZE)	Lonato (ITA)			New Delhi (IND)
40	2025	Buenos Aires (ARG)	Nicosia (CYP)	Lonato (ITA)	Lima (PER)			
41	2026	Tangier (MAR)	Almaty (KAZ)	Lonato (ITA)	Hangzhou (CHN)			

=== Running target (discontinued) ===
Year	World Cup 1	World Cup 2	World Cup 3	World Cup 4	World Cup 5	World Cup 6	World Cup Final
1989	Guatemala City (GUA)	Suhl (GDR)	Munich (FRG)				Munich (GER)
1990	Guatemala City (GUA)	Mexico City (MEX)	Los Angeles (USA)	Suhl (GDR)	Munich (FRG)	Zurich (SUI)	Munich (GER)
1991	Guatemala City (GUA)	Los Angeles (USA)	Seoul (KOR)	Zagreb (YUG)	Munich (GER)	Suhl (GER)	Munich (GER)
1992	Guatemala City (GUA)	Los Angeles (USA)	Suhl (GER)	Munich (GER)	Milan (ITA)		Munich (GER)
1993	Seoul (KOR)	Los Angeles (USA)	Munich (GER)	Milan (ITA)			Munich (GER)
1994	Guatemala City (GUA)	Beijing (CHN)	Milan (ITA)	Barcelona (ESP)			Munich (GER)
1995	Seoul (KOR)	Munich (GER)	Milan (ITA)	Guatemala City (GUA)			Munich (GER)
1996	Havana (CUB)	Atlanta (USA)	Plzeň (CZE)	Milan (ITA)			Näfels (SUI)
1997	Havana (CUB)	Seoul (KOR)	Munich (GER)	Milan (ITA)			Lugano (SUI)
1998	Guatemala City (GUA)	Atlanta (USA)	Munich (GER)	Milan (ITA)			Zurich (SUI)
1999	Seoul (KOR)	Munich (GER)	Milan (ITA)	Atlanta (USA)			Munich (GER)
2000	Sydney (AUS)	Milan (ITA)	Munich (GER)	Guatemala City (GUA)			Munich (GER)
2001	Atlanta (USA)	Seoul (KOR)	Milan (ITA)	Munich (GER)			Munich (GER)
2002	Sydney (AUS)	Shanghai (CHN)	Atlanta (USA)	Plzeň (CZE)			Munich (GER)
2003	Zagreb (CRO)	Munich (GER)	Changwon (KOR)	Suhl (GER)			Milan (ITA)
2004	Bangkok (THA)	Sydney (AUS)	Athens (GRE)	Milan (ITA)			Bangkok (THA)

== Spin-offs ==
The lack for a World Cup in the non-Olympic events has led to the creation of a European Cup by the European Shooting Confederation, based on largely the same rules as the ISSF World Cup. Originally it consisted of 300 metre rifle three positions, 300 metre rifle prone and 300 metre standard rifle, but since the 2005 season there is also a European Cup in 25 metre center-fire pistol and 25 metre standard pistol.

Since 2016, there has also been a separate world cup specifically for junior shooters.

== Multi-medalists ==
In this table the shooters with at least 7 gold medals won in the World Cup stages.

Still active

#	Name	Nation	Years	Gold medal	Silver medal	Bronze medal	Total	Discipline
1	Ralf Schumann	Germany East Germany	1986–2012	39	7	10	56	Pistol
2	Rajmond Debevec	Slovenia Yugoslavia	1986–2013	27	21	19	67	Rifle
3	Christian Reitz	Germany	2008–2023	19	13	9	41	Pistol
4	Roberto Di Donna	Italy	1991–2001	19	7	7	33	Pistol
5	Vincent Hancock	United States	2005–2023	19	5	2	26	Shotgun
6	Sergei Martynov	Belarus Soviet Union	1988–2012	17	8	7	32	Rifle
7	Jozef Gonci	Slovakia	1995–2011	16	9	11	36	Rifle
8	Jongoh Jin	South Korea	2003–2017	16	6	5	27	Pistol
9	Qinan Zhu	China	2004–2016	15	6	6	27	Rifle
10	Yifu Wang	China	1986–2003	13	13	7	33	Pistol
11	Manu Bhaker	India	2018–present	13	2	4	19	Pistol
12	Harald Stenvaag	Norway	1986–2004	12	13	13	38	Rifle
13	Damir Mikec	Serbia	2009–2024	11	11	3	25	Pistol
14	Franck Dumoulin	France	1996–2010	11	7	5	23	Pistol
15	Zongliang Tan	China	1993–2012	11	7	4	22	Pistol
16	Igor Basinski	Belarus Soviet Union	1986–2002	11	4	6	21	Pistol
17	Ennio Falco	Italy	1988–2009	10	7	6	23	Shotgun
18	Attila Solti	Guatemala Hungary	1987–2000	10	7	5	22	Running
19	Michael Jakosits	Germany West Germany	1989–2003	10	4	5	19	Running
20	Saurabh Chaudhary	India	2019–present	10	4	3	17	Pistol
21	Daniele Di Spigno	Italy	1997–2017	10	3	3	16	Shotgun
21	Giovanni Pellielo	Italy	1992–2022	10	2	8	20	Shotgun
22	Manfred Kurzer	Germany	1991–2004	10	2	5	17	Running
23	Artem Khadjibekov	Russia	1993–2010	9	18	7	34	Rifle
24	Matthew Emmons	United States	2001–2016	9	12	11	32	Rifle
25	Boris Kokorev	Russia Unified Team Soviet Union	1987–2008	9	11	6	26	Pistol
26	Péter Sidi	Hungary	1999–2017	9	10	7	26	Rifle
27	Alexey Alipov	Russia	1998–2021	9	9	10	28	Shotgun
28	Alberto Fernandez	Spain	2007–2024	9	5	4	18	Shotgun
29	Jean-Pierre Amat	France	1986–2000	9	5	3	17	Rifle
30	Tanyu Kiriakov	Bulgaria	1986–2008	8	13	11	32	Pistol
31	Michael Diamond	Australia	1991–2015	8	12	4	24	Shotgun
32	Oleh Omelchuk	Ukraine	2007–2023	8	7	3	18	Pistol
33	Niccolò Campriani	Italy	2009–2014	8	4	3	15	Rifle
34	Mikhail Nestruev	Russia	1996–2009	8	3	6	17	Pistol
34	Jiri Privratsky	Czech Republic	2021–2024	8	3	6	17	Rifle
36	Albano Pera	Italy	1986–1997	8	3	4	15	Shotgun
37	Sergei Pyzhianov	Russia Unified Team Soviet Union	1986–1997	7	12	8	27	Pistol
38	Sergey Kamenskiy	Russia	2014–2021	7	6	1	14	Rifle
39	Tomoyuki Matsuda	Japan	2008–2017	7	4	4	15	Pistol
40	Warren Potent	Australia	2007–2016	7	3	2	12	Rifle
