= 2017 European 10 m Events Championships =

- Dates: 6–12 March
- Host city: Maribor, Slovenia
- Level: Senior
- Events: 4 men + 4 women

The 2017 European 10 m Events Championships were held in Maribor, Slovenia from March 6 to 12, 2017.

== Men's events ==
Event	Gold		Silver		Bronze	
Pistol	Christian Reitz; Germany	241.6 WR ER	Damir Mikec; Serbia	241.4	İsmail Keleş; Turkey	220.7
Pistol Team	Russia; Nikolai Kilin; Vladimir Gontcharov; Artem Chernousov	1734	Ukraine; Pavlo Korostylov; Viktor Bankin; Oleh Omelchuk	1728	Serbia; Damir Mikec; Dusko Petrov; Dimitrije Grgić	1727
Rifle	Vladimir Maslennikov; Russia	250.5	Oleh Tsarkov; Ukraine	247.7	Alexis Raynaud; France	225.5
Rifle Team	Russia; Vladimir Maslennikov; Sergey Kamenskiy; Evgeny Panchenko	1878.5	Serbia; Milutin Stefanović; Milenko Sebić; Stevan Pletikosić	1869.2	Germany; Maximilian Dallinger; Robin Zissel; Dennis Welsch	1868.5
Running Target	Łukasz Czapla; Poland		Vladislav Shchepotkin; Russia		Vladislav Prianishnikov; Russia	
Running Target Team	Russia; Vladislav Shchepotkin; Vladislav Prianishnikov; Maxim Stepanov	1739 WR ER	Sweden; Jesper Nyberg; Emil Martinsson; Niklas Bergström	1711	Finland; Tomi-Pekka Heikkilä; Krister Holmberg; Heikki Lähdekorpi	1704
Running Target Mixed	Vladislav Shchepotkin; Russia	386+19+17	Maxim Stepanov; Russia	386+19+16	Emil Martinsson; Sweden	384
Running Target Mixed Team	Russia; Vladislav Shchepotkin; Maxim Stepanov; Vladislav Prianishnikov	1153	Sweden; Emil Martinsson; Jesper Nyberg; Niklas Bergström	1133 (27x)	Finland; Tomi-Pekka Heikkilä; Krister Holmberg; Heikki Lähdekorpi	1133 (20x)

== Women's events ==
Event	Gold		Silver		Bronze	
Pistol	Zorana Arunović; Serbia	246.9 WR ER	Olena Kostevych; Ukraine	239.5	Sonia Franquet; France	218.9
Pistol Team	Serbia; Zorana Arunović; Bobana Veličković; Jasmina Milovanović	1146	Germany; Sandra Reitz; Julia Hochmuth; Stefanie Thurmann	1139	Russia; Vitalina Batsarashkina; Margarita Lomova; Alena Doroshkevich	1134
Rifle	Snježana Pejčić; Croatia	249.1 ER	Stine Nielsen; Denmark	247.8	Daria Vdovina; Russia	224.1
Rifle Team	Russia; Anastasiia Galashina; Yulia Karimova; Daria Vdovina	1251.5	Croatia; Snježana Pejčić; Valentina Gustin; Marta Zeljkovic	1245.3	Czech Republic; Nikola Mazurová; Aneta Brabcová; Gabriela Vognarová	1244.2
Running Target	Galina Avramenko; Ukraine		Lilit Mkrtchyan; Armenia		Julia Eydenzon; Russia	
Running Target Team	Russia; Olga Stepanova; Julia Eydenzon; Irina Izmalkova	1112	Ukraine; Galina Avramenko; Viktoriya Rybovalova; Liudmyla Vasylyuk	1107	Hungary; Gabriella Körtvélyessy; Edit Máthé; Hajnalka Ádám	998
Running Target Mixed	Galina Avramenko; Ukraine	373	Olga Stepanova; Russia	371	Irina Izmalkova; Russia	370
Running Target Mixed Team	Russia; Olga Stepanova; Irina Izmalkova; Julia Eydenzon	1110	Ukraine; Galina Avramenko; Viktoriya Rybovalova; Liudmyla Vasylyuk	1102	Hungary; Edit Máthé; Hajnalka Ádám; Gabriella Körtvélyessy	1008

== Mixed events ==
Event	Gold	Silver	Bronze
Pistol	Serbia; Zorana Arunović; Damir Mikec	Russia; Vitalina Batsarashkina; Vladimir Gontcharov	Azerbaijan; Ruslan Lunev; Nigar Nasirova
Rifle	Serbia; Andrea Arsović; Milutin Stefanović	Russia; Vladimir Maslennikov; Daria Vdovina	Germany; Selina Gschwandtner; Maximilian Dallinger

== Men's junior events ==
Event	Gold		Silver		Bronze	
Pistol	Anton Aristarkhov; Russia	239.8 WRJ ERJ	Paolo Monna; Italy	239.7	Ernests Erbs; Latvia	216.7
Pistol Team	Russia; Anton Aristarkhov; Alexander Petrov; Mikhail Isakov	1719	Germany; Robin Walter; Nils Strubel; Aleksandar Todorov	1706	Ukraine; Pavlo Krepostniak; Bohdan Kyrylenko; Oleksandr Samostrol	1705
Rifle	Andrei Golovkov; Russia	249.8 WRJ ERJ	Lazar Kovačević; Serbia	249.0	István Péni; Hungary	227.0
Rifle Team	Hungary; István Péni; Péter Vas; Csaba Kovács	1873.3 WRJ ERJ	Croatia; Borna Petanjek; Andrija Mikuljan; Miran Maričić	1873.1	Russia; Ilia Marsov; Andrei Golovkov; Roman Mailkov	1864.5
Running Target	Ihor Kizyma; Ukraine		Maksym Babushok; Ukraine		Nicolas Tranchant; France	
Running Target Team	Ukraine; Ihor Kizyma; Maksym Babushok; Danylo Danilenko	1687	Russia; Valerii Davydov; Iaroslav Klepikov; Egor Spekhov	1645	Hungary; István Sándor; Richárd Nagy; Áron Macsek	1593
Running Target Mixed	Ihor Kizyma; Ukraine	380	Maksym Babushok; Ukraine	377	Valerii Davydov; Russia	372+19+17
Running Target Mixed Team	Ukraine; Ihor Kizyma; Maksym Babushok; Danylo Danilenko	1119	Russia; Valerii Davydov; Iaroslav Klepikov; Egor Spekhov	1073	Hungary; István Sándor; Richárd Nagy; Áron Macsek	1024

== Women's junior events ==
Event	Gold		Silver		Bronze	
Pistol	Veronika Major; Hungary	235.9 WRJ ERJ	Polina Konarieva; Ukraine	235.0	Denisa Bezděčná; Czech Republic	214.3
Pistol Team	France; Mathilde Lamolle; Camille Jedrzejewski; Kateline Nicolas	1118 (29x)	Germany; Jessica Schrader; Miriam Piechaczek; Lea Kleesattel	1118 (16x)	Czech Republic; Denisa Bezděčná; Anna Dědová; Alžběta Dědová	1116
Rifle	Jade Bordet; France	249.1 ERJ	Isabelle Johansson; Sweden	247.3	Anna Janssen; Germany	226.7
Rifle Team	Germany; Anna Janssen; Verena Schmid; Jana Heck	1241.8	Serbia; Tatjana Banjac; Sanja Vukašinović; Marija Malić	1240.4	Italy; Alessandra Luciani; Nicole Gabrielli; Elena Pizzi	1239.5
Running Target	Veronika Major; Hungary		Kseniia Anufrieva; Russia		Anna Kostina; Russia	
Running Target Team	Russia; Kseniia Anufrieva; Anna Kostina; Natalia Pochatkova	1086	Ukraine; Viktoriia Stetsiura; Yuliya Tymoshko; Darya Rozhniatovska	1043	Hungary; Veronika Major; Borbála Csányi; Lilla Békevári	1008
Running Target Mixed	Veronika Major; Hungary	378	Anna Kostina; Russia	363	Viktoriia Stetsiura; Ukraine	355
Running Target Mixed Team	Russia; Kseniia Anufrieva; Anna Kostina; Natalia Pochatkova	1062	Ukraine; Viktoriia Stetsiura; Yuliya Tymoshko; Darya Rozhniatovska	1047	Hungary; Veronika Major; Borbála Csányi; Lilla Békevári	1043

== Mixed junior events ==
Event	Gold	Silver	Bronze
Pistol	France; Nicolas Thiel; Mathilde Lamolle	Russia; Anton Aristarkhov; Olga Veretelnikova	Italy; Paolo Monna; Rebecca Lesti
Rifle	Germany; Verena Schmid; David Koenders	Serbia; Sanja Vukašinović; Lazar Kovačević	Czech Republic; Filip Nepejchal; Nikola Foistová

== Medal table ==
Rank	Nation	Gold	Silver	Bronze	Total
1	Russia (RUS)	14	10	8	32
2	Ukraine (UKR)	6	9	2	17
3	Serbia (SRB)	4	5	1	10
4	Hungary (HUN)	4	0	7	11
5	Germany (GER)	3	3	3	9
6	France (FRA)	3	0	3	6
7	Croatia (CRO)	1	2	0	3
8	Poland (POL)	1	0	0	1
9	Sweden (SWE)	0	3	1	4
10	Denmark (DEN)	0	2	0	2
11	Italy (ITA)	0	1	2	3
12	Armenia (ARM)	0	1	0	1
13	Czech Republic (CZE)	0	0	4	4
14	Finland (FIN)	0	0	2	2
15	Azerbaijan (AZE)	0	0	1	1
15	Latvia (LAT)	0	0	1	1
15	Turkey (TUR)	0	0	1	1
Totals (17 entries)		36	36	36	108

== See also ==
- European Shooting Confederation
- International Shooting Sport Federation
- List of medalists at the European Shooting Championships
- List of medalists at the European Shotgun Championships
