= 2019 European Running Target Championships =

- Dates: 8 - 15 July
- Host city: Gyenesdiás, Hungary
- Venue: BEFAG Sportlőtér
- Level: Senior
- Events: 4 men (2 individual + 2 team); 4 women (2 individual + 2 team)
- Participation: 162 athletes from 10 nations

The 2019 European Running Target Championships was the 14th edition of the running target competition, European Running Target Championships, organised for the first time by the European Shooting Confederation (ESC) and not by the International Shooting Sport Federation (ISSF).

== Results ==
=== Men ===
Event	Gold	Silver	Bronze
50 m Running Target	(Sweden) Jesper Nyberg	(Russia) Maxim Stepanov	(Russia) Mikhail Azarenko
50 m Running Target Team	Russia; Mikhail Azarenko; Maxim Stepanov; Dmitry Romanov	Sweden; Jesper Nyberg; Emil Martinsson; Oscar Roland Andersson	Finland; Topi Hulkkonen; Heikki Lahdekorpi; Krister Holmberg
50 m Running Target Mixed	(Poland) Łukasz Czapla	(Sweden) Emil Martinsson	(Ukraine) Ihor Kizyma
50 m Running Target Mixed Team	Finland; Topi Hulkkonen; Heikki Lahdekorpi; Krister Holmberg	Russia; Mikhail Azarenko; Maxim Stepanov; Dmitry Romanov	Sweden; Jesper Nyberg; Emil Martinsson; Oscar Roland Andersson

=== Women ===
Event	Gold	Silver	Bronze
50 m running target	(Russia) Viktoriya Rybovalova	(Ukraine) Valentyna Goncharova	(Germany) Daniela Vogelbacher
50 m running target, team	Ukraine; Valentyna Goncharova; Viktoriya Rybovalova; Galina Avramenko	Russia; Irina Izmalkova; Olga Stepanova; Julia Eydenzon	Hungary; Veronica Major; Gabriella Körtvélyessy; Viktória Bedekovich
50 m running target mixed	(Hungary) Veronica Major	(Ukraine) Galina Avramenko	(Russia) Irina Izmalkova
50 m running target mixed, team	Ukraine; Valentyna Goncharova; Viktoriya Rybovalova; Galina Avramenko	Russia; Irina Izmalkova; Olga Stepanova; Julia Eydenzon	Hungary; Veronica Major; Gabriella Körtvélyessy; Viktória Bedekovich

== Medal table ==
Host country

#	Country	1st place, gold medalist(s)	2nd place, silver medalist(s)	3rd place, bronze medalist(s)	Tot.
1	Russia	2	4	2	8
2	Ukraine	2	2	1	5
3	Hungary	2	0	2	4
4	Sweden	1	2	1	4
5	Finland	1	0	1	2
6	Germany	0	0	1	1
Total		8	8	8	24

== See also ==
- List of medalists at the European Shooting Championships
- List of medalists at the European Shotgun Championships
