= 2018 European 10 m Events Championships =

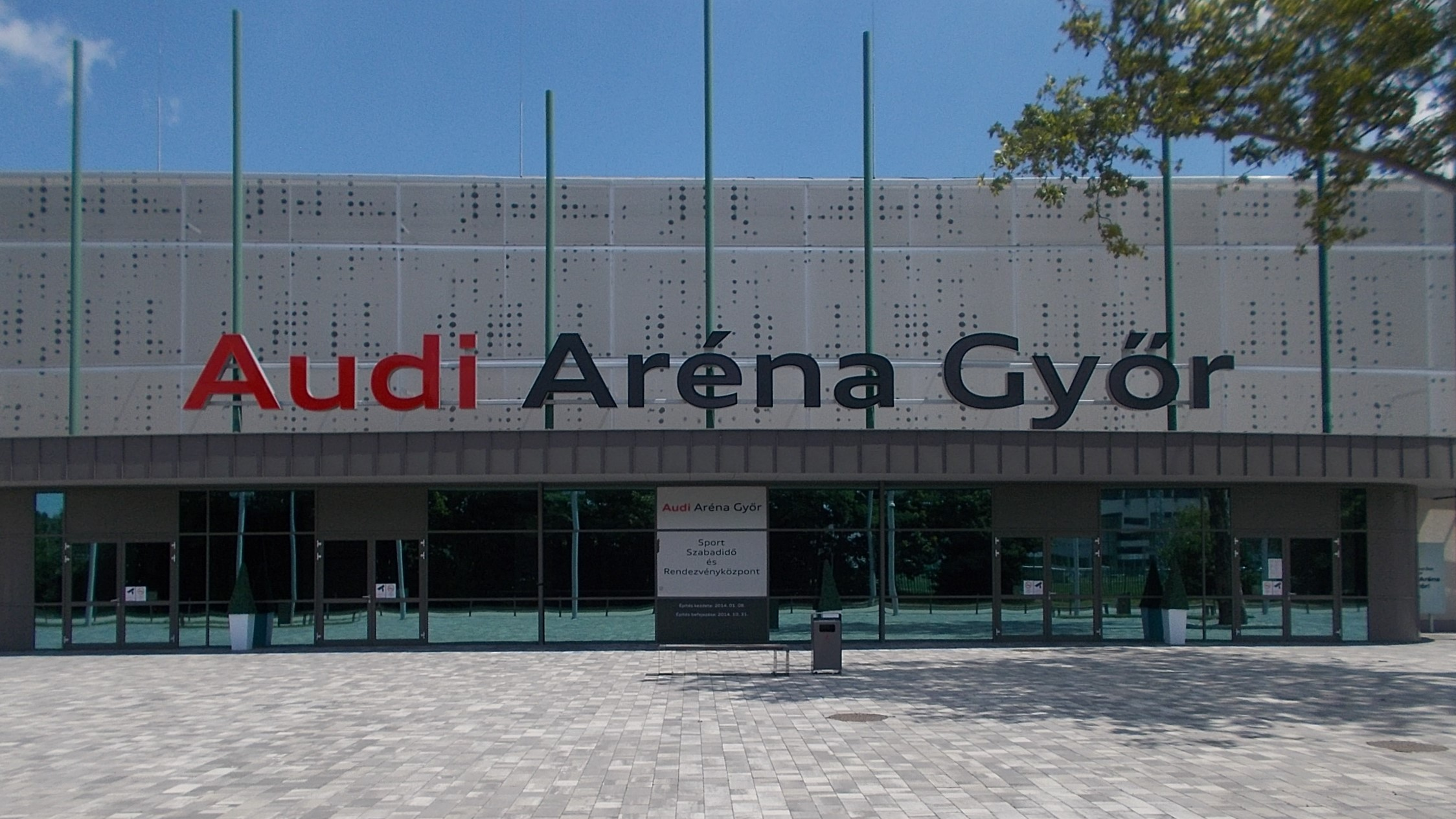
- Audi Arena Győr
- Dates: 16 - 26 February
- Host city: Győr, Hungary
- Venue: Audi Aréna
- Level: Senior
- Events: 4 men + 4 women

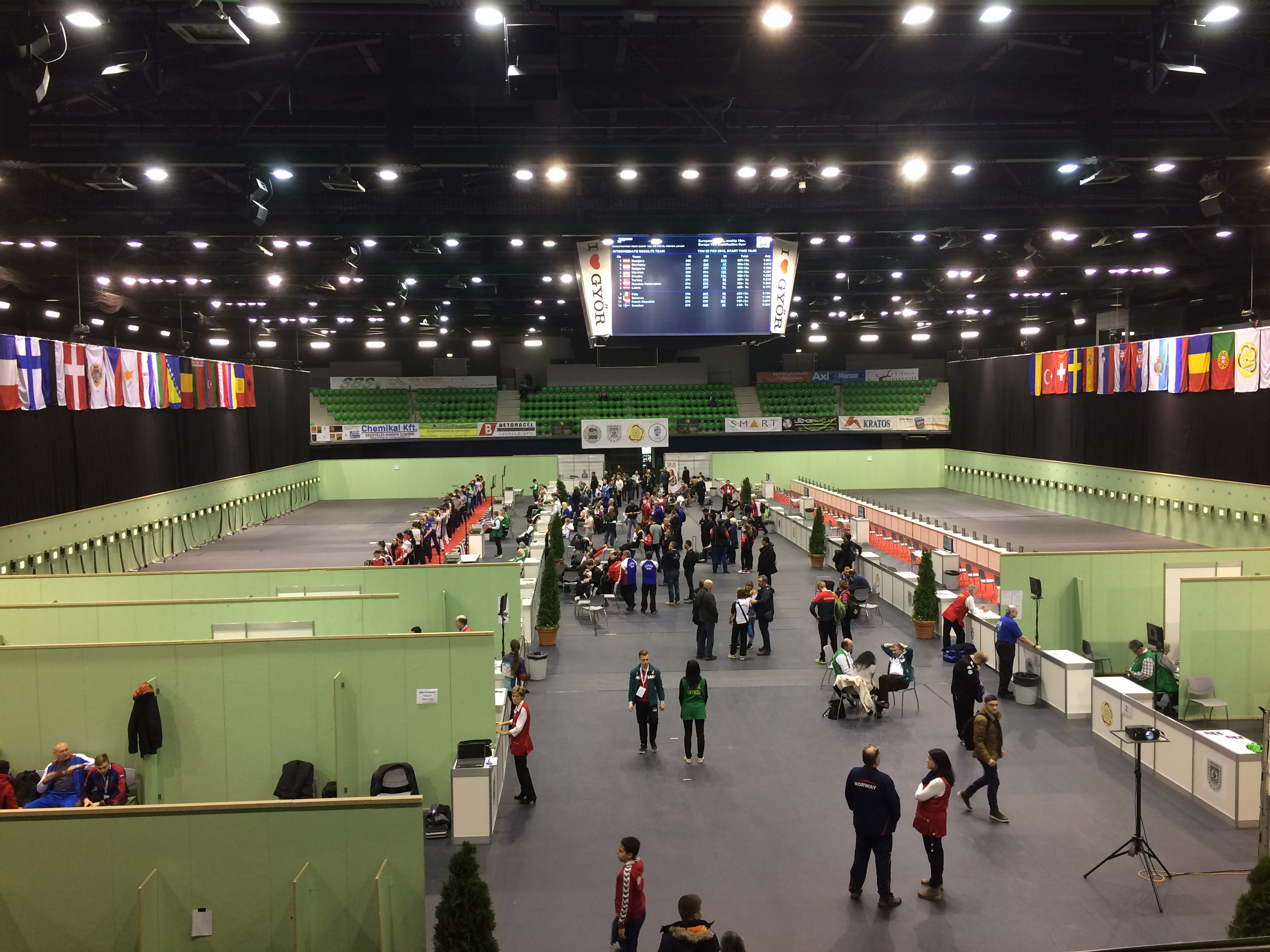
Arena configured for 10m airgun events

The 2018 European 10 m Events Championships took place in Audi Aréna, Győr, Hungary from 16 to 26 February 2018.

== Men's events ==
Event	Gold		Silver		Bronze	
Pistol	Yusuf Dikeç; Turkey	241.6	Artem Chernousov; Russia	239.8	João Costa; Portugal	218.8
Pistol Team	Ukraine; Pavlo Korostylov; Oleh Omelchuk; Viktor Bankin		Serbia; Damir Mikec; Dimitrije Grgić; Dusko Petrov		Germany; Matthias Holderried; Philipp Käfer; Michael Schwald	
Rifle	Vladimir Maslennikov; Russia	251.0 WR ER	Alexander Dryagin; Russia	248.2	Petar Gorša; Croatia	227.0
Rifle Team	Russia; Sergey Kamenskiy; Vladimir Maslennikov; Alexander Dryagin		Croatia; Petar Gorša; Marin Čerina; Miran Maričić		Hungary; István Péni; Péter Sidi; Péter Somogyi	
Running Target	Emil Martinsson; Sweden		Jesper Nyberg; Sweden		Maxim Stepanov; Russia	
Running Target Team	Sweden; Jesper Nyberg; Emil Martinsson; Niklas Bergström	1734	Russia; Vladyslav Prianishnikov; Maxim Stepanov; Vladislav Shchepotkin	1721	Finland; Tomi-Pekka Heikkila; Heikki Lahdekorpi; Krister Holmberg	1716
Running Target Mixed	Vladislav Shchepotkin; Russia	388	Maxim Stepanov; Russia	386	László Boros; Hungary	385
Running Target Mixed Team	Russia; Vladyslav Prianishnikov; Maxim Stepanov; Vladislav Shchepotkin	1155	Sweden; Jesper Nyberg; Emil Martinsson; Niklas Bergström	1145	Hungary; László Boros; Jozsef Sike; Tamas Tasi	1135

== Women's events ==
Event	Gold		Silver		Bronze	
Pistol	Céline Goberville; France	240.2	Zorana Arunović; Serbia	239.8	Bobana Veličković Momčilović; Serbia	219.0
Pistol Team	Russia; Vitalina Batsarashkina; Ekaterina Korshunova; Margarita Lomova		Germany; Monika Karsch; Sandra Reitz; Carina Wimmer		Serbia; Zorana Arunović; Bobana Veličković Momčilović; Jelena Tomić	
Rifle	Stine Nielsen; Denmark	249.1	Katarzyna Komorowska; Poland	248.7	Manon Smeets; Netherlands	226.8
Rifle Team	Romania; Laura-Georgeta Coman; Roxana-Georgiana Tudose; Eliza-Alexandra Molnar		Denmark; Stine Nielsen; Rikke Ibsen; Line Petermann		Ukraine; Anna Ilina; Mariia Voitsekhivska; Olga Zakapko	
Running Target	Julia Eydenzon; Russia		Viktoriya Rybovalova; Ukraine		Olga Stepanova; Russia	
Running Target Team	Russia; Olga Stepanova; Julia Eydenzon; Irina Izmalkova	1694 WR ER	Ukraine; Galina Avramenko; Viktoriya Rybovalova; Liudmyla Vasylyuk	1663	Hungary; Gabriella Kortvelyessy; Edit Mathe; Veronika Major	1617
Running Target Mixed	Olga Stepanova; Russia	381	Julia Eydenzon; Russia	379(18)	Galina Avramenko; Ukraine	379(17)
Running Target Mixed Team	Russia; Olga Stepanova; Julia Eydenzon; Irina Izmalkova	1135 ER	Ukraine; Galina Avramenko; Viktoriya Rybovalova; Liudmyla Vasylyuk	1114	Hungary; Gabriella Kortvelyessy; Edit Mathe; Veronika Major	1025

== Mixed events ==
Event	Gold		Silver		Bronze	
Pistol	Russia; Margarita Lomova; Artem Chernousov	482.8 WR ER	Serbia; Zorana Arunović; Damir Mikec	480.0	Ukraine; Olena Kostevych; Oleh Omelchuk	416.6
Rifle	Russia; Daria Vdovina; Vladimir Maslennikov	498.3 WR ER	Serbia; Andrea Arsović; Milutin Stefanović	495.0	Ukraine; Anna Ilina; Oleh Tsarkov	431.9
Running Target	Russia; Maxim Stepanov; Olga Stepanova		Russia; Vladislav Shchepotkin; Julia Eydenzon		France; Nicolas Tranchant; Florence Louis	

== Men's junior events ==
Event	Gold		Silver		Bronze	
Pistol	Anton Aristarkhov; Russia	239.7	Alexander Petrov; Russia	238.9	Aleksandr Kondrashin; Russia	217.6
Pistol Team	Russia; Anton Aristarkhov; Aleksandr Kondrashin; Alexander Petrov	866	Ukraine; Maksym Horodynets; Bohdan Kyrylenko; Dmytro Honta	844	Germany; Paul Fröhlich; Jonathan Mader; Robin Walter	843
Rifle	Ilia Marsov; Russia	249.2	Filip Nepejchal; Czech Republic	249.0	Grigorii Shamakov; Russia	226.8
Rifle Team	Russia; Denis Goncharenko; Grigorii Shamakov; Ilia Marsov	621.0	Croatia; Borna Petanjek; Luka Štrbenac; Denis Tomašević	620.7	Italy; Carmine Formichella; Alexandros Chatziplis; Marco Suppini	612.4
Running Target	Denys Babliuk; Ukraine		Espen Teppdalen Nordsveen; Norway		Hovhannes Margaryan; Armenia	
Running Target Team	Ukraine; Denys Babliuk; Maksym Babushok; Danylo Danilenko	1684	Russia; Samir Khagi; Pavel Golubev; Egor Spekhov	1602	Hungary; István Sándor; Ferenc Haris; Áron Mácsek	1593
Running Target Mixed	Maksym Babushok; Ukraine	383	Danylo Danilenko; Ukraine	375	Espen Teppdalen Nordsveen; Norway	372
Running Target Mixed Team	Ukraine; Maksym Babushok; Danylo Danilenko; Denys Babliuk	1124	Russia; Samir Khagi; Pavel Golubev; Egor Spekhov	1064	Hungary; István Sándor; Ferenc Haris; Áron Mácsek	1063

== Women's junior events ==
Event	Gold		Silver		Bronze	
Pistol	Denisa Bezdecna; Czech Republic	236.8 ERJ	Miroslava Mincheva; Bulgaria	249.2	Iana Enina; Russia	226.8
Pistol Team	Russia; Iana Enina; Ekaterina Chikanova; Olga Veretelnikova	562	Italy; Giulia Campostrini; Maria Varricchio; Brigida Margherita Veccaro	558	Belarus; Liubou Stralchonak; Yulyana Rohach; Marharyta Ramanchuk	554
Rifle	Anna Janssen; Germany	250.3 ERJ	Anastasiia Dereviagina; Russia	249.2	Marija Malic; Serbia	226.8
Rifle Team	Germany; Lisa Haunerdinger; Anna Janssen; Larissa Weindorf	935.9	Finland; Viivi Natalia Kemppi; Marianne Palo; Henna Viljanen	932.7	Russia; Daria Boldinova; Anastasiia Dereviagina; Tatiana Kharkova	931.6
Running Target	Anna Kostina; Russia		Kseniia Anufreiva; Russia		Darya Rozhniatovska; Ukraine	
Running Target Team	Russia; Anna Kostina; Kseniia Anufreiva; Tatiana Boltaeva	1568 WRJ ERJ	Ukraine; Kristina Hilevych; Darya Rozhniatovska; Viktoriia Stetsiura	1561	Hungary; Klaudia Palánki; Borbála Csányi; Viktória Nagy	1452
Running Target Mixed	Anna Kostina; Russia	373	Darya Rozhniatovska; Ukraine	362	Kristina Hilevych; Ukraine	357
Running Target Mixed Team	Russia; Anna Kostina; Kseniia Anufreiva; Tatiana Boltaeva	1067	Ukraine; Darya Rozhniatovska; Kristina Hilevych; Viktoriia Stetsiura	1034	Hungary; Klaudia Palánki; Borbála Csányi; Viktória Nagy	961

== Mixed junior events ==
Event	Gold		Silver		Bronze	
Pistol	Russia 1 Iana Enina; Anton Aristarkhov	480.7 WRJ ERJ	Bulgaria 2 Monika Boteva; Kaloyan Stamenov	472.1	Bulgaria 1 Miroslava Mincheva; Kiril Kirov	411.5
Rifle	Russia 2 Tatiana Kharkova; Griogirii Shamakov	498.4 WRJ ERJ	Russia 1 Daria Boldinova; Ilia Marsov	494.3	Norway 1 Jeanette Hegg Duestad; Benjamin Tingsrud Karlsen	430.0

== Men's youth events ==
Event	Gold		Silver		Bronze	
Pistol	Jason Solari; Switzerland	236.1	Dmytro Honta; Ukraine	233.2	Ihor Solovei; Ukraine	213.7
Rifle	Maximilian Ulbrich; Germany	247.1(10.5)	Grigorii Shamakov; Russia	247.1 (8.8)	Denis Goncharenko; Russia	221.8

== Women's youth events ==
Event	Gold		Silver		Bronze	
Pistol	Gloria Fernandez; Spain	233.7	Iana Enina; Russia	233.0	Vanessa Seeger; Germany	213.1
Rifle	Anastasiia Dereviagina; Russia	249.2	Sofia Benetti; Italy	247.0	Wiktoria Zuzanna Bober; Poland	224.2

== Medal table ==
Rank	Nation	Gold	Silver	Bronze	Total
1	Russia (RUS)	24	14	7	45
2	Ukraine (UKR)	5	9	7	21
3	Germany (GER)	3	1	3	7
4	Sweden (SWE)	2	2	0	4
5	Czech Republic (CZE)	1	1	0	2
5	Denmark (DEN)	1	1	0	2
7	France (FRA)	1	0	1	2
8	Romania (ROU)	1	0	0	1
8	Spain (ESP)	1	0	0	1
8	Switzerland (SUI)	1	0	0	1
8	Turkey (TUR)	1	0	0	1
12	Serbia (SRB)	0	4	3	7
13	Bulgaria (BUL)	0	2	1	3
13	Croatia (CRO)	0	2	1	3
13	Italy (ITA)	0	2	1	3
16	Norway (NOR)	0	1	2	3
17	Finland (FIN)	0	1	1	2
17	Poland (POL)	0	1	1	2
19	Hungary (HUN)	0	0	9	9
20	Armenia (ARM)	0	0	1	1
20	Belarus (BLR)	0	0	1	1
20	Netherlands (NED)	0	0	1	1
20	Portugal (POR)	0	0	1	1
Totals (23 entries)		41	41	41	123

== See also ==
- European Shooting Confederation
- International Shooting Sport Federation
- List of medalists at the European Shooting Championships
- List of medalists at the European Shotgun Championships
