= 2012 European 10 m Events Championships =

- Dates: 16 - 19 February
- Host city: Vierumäki, Finland
- Level: Senior
- Events: 4 men + 4 women

The 2012 European 10 m Events Championships were held in Vierumäki, Finland from February 16-19, 2012.

== Men's events ==
Event	Gold	Silver	Bronze
Pistol	Pablo Carrera; Spain	Yusuf Dikeç; Turkey	Leonid Yekimov; Russia
Pistol TEAM	Russia; Leonid Yekimov; Vladimir Isakov; Anton Gourianov	Turkey; Yusuf Dikeç; İsmail Keleş; Abdullah Ömer Alimoğlu	Belarus; Vladislav Kocarenko; Yury Dauhapolau; Vitali Kudzi
Running Target	Maxim Stepanov; Russia	Emil Martinsson; Sweden	Aleksandr Blinov; Russia
Running Target TEAM	Russia; Aleksandr Blinov; Maxim Stepanov; Dmitry Romanov	Finland; Krister Holmberg; Tomi-Pekka Heikkilä; Tarmo Koskela	Ukraine; Vladislav Prianishnikov; Yehor Chyrva; Andrey Gilchenko
Running Target Mixed	Vladyslav Prianishnikov; Ukraine	Krister Holmberg; Finland	Dmitry Romanov; Russia
Running Target Mixed TEAM	Russia; Dmitry Romanov; Maxim Stepanov; Aleksandr Blinov	Ukraine; Vladislav Prianishnikov; Yehor Chyrva; Andrey Gilchenko	Czech Republic; Miroslav Januš; Jonáš Bedřich; Josef Nikl
Rifle	Denis Sokolov; Russia	Niccolò Campriani; Italy	Marco De Nicolo; Italy
Rifle TEAM	Italy; Niccolò Campriani; Marco De Nicolo; Simone Tressoldi	France; Jérémy Monnier; Pierre Edmond Piasecki; Etienne Germond	Russia; Denis Sokolov; Nazar Louginets; Alexei Kamenski

== Women's events ==
Event	Gold	Silver	Bronze
Pistol	Bobana Veličković; Serbia	Olena Kostevych; Ukraine	Liubov Yaskevich; Russia
Pistol TEAM	Russia; Liubov Yaskevich; Galina Orlovskaya; Kira Mozgalova	Hungary; Zsófia Csonka; Adrienn Nemes; Renáta Tobai-Sike	Serbia; Bobana Veličković; Zorana Arunović; Jasna Šekarić
Running Target	Irina Izmalkova; Russia	Olga Stepanova; Russia	Galina Avramenko; Ukraine
Running Target TEAM	Russia; Olga Stepanova; Irina Izmalkova; Julia Eydenzon	Ukraine; Galina Avramenko; Liudmyla Vasylyuk; Viktoriya Rybovalova	Finland; Marika Salminen; Marianna Mollari; Maria Heikola
Running Target Mixed	Galina Avramenko; Ukraine	Olga Stepanova; Russia	Liudmyla Vasylyuk; Ukraine
Running Target Mixed TEAM	Russia; Olga Stepanova; Irina Izmalkova; Julia Eydenzon	Ukraine; Galina Avramenko; Liudmyla Vasylyuk; Viktoriya Rybovalova	Finland; Marika Salminen; Maria Heikola; Marianna Mollari
Rifle	Sonja Pfeilschifter; Germany	Katerina Emmons; Czech Republic	Andrea Arsovic; Serbia
Rifle TEAM	Germany; Sonja Pfeilschifter; Barbara Engleder; Beate Gauß	Serbia; Andrea Arsović; Dragana Todorović; Ivana Maksimović	France; Émilie Évesque; Sandy Morin; Myriam Duperron

== Men's Junior events ==
Event	Gold	Silver	Bronze
Pistol	Kamil Gersten (POL)	Ante Kristo (CRO)	Vincent Jeanningros (FRA)
Pistol TEAM	Switzerland	Russia	Czech Republic
Running Target	Sami Heikkila (FIN)	Ivan Serebryakov (RUS)	Jani Suoranta (FIN)
Running Target TEAM	Finland	Ukraine	Russia
Running Target Mixed	Sami Heikkila (FIN)	Vladlen Onopko (UKR)	Dmytro Chausov (UKR)
Running Target Mixed TEAM	Finland	Ukraine	Russia
Rifle	Michael Janker (GER)	Giuseppe Pio Capano (ITA)	Sergiy Kasper (UKR)
Rifle TEAM	Germany	Russia	Ukraine

== Women's Junior events ==
Event	Gold	Silver	Bronze
Pistol	Joanna Tomala (POL)	Nadzeya Leanavets (BLR)	Valentina Pereglin (CRO)
Pistol TEAM	Poland	Germany	France
Running Target	Micaela Qvarnstrom (FIN)	Mariia Kramar (UKR)	Ganna Chehovska (UKR)
Running Target TEAM	Ukraine	Russia	France
Running Target Mixed	Ganna Chehovska (UKR)	Oksana Sokolova (RUS)	Mariia Kramar (UKR)
Running Target Mixed TEAM	Ukraine	Russia	France
Rifle	Mira Biatovszki (HUN)	Nikola Mazurova (CZE)	Sandra Pettersson (SWE)
Rifle TEAM	Switzerland	Czech Republic	Ukraine

== Medal summary ==
=== Seniors ===
Rank	Nation	Gold	Silver	Bronze	Total
1	Russia	9	2	5	16
2	Ukraine	2	4	3	9
3	Germany	2	0	0	2
4	Serbia	1	1	2	4
5	Italy	1	1	1	3
6	Spain	1	0	0	1
7	Finland	0	2	2	4
8	Turkey	0	2	0	2
9	Czech Republic	0	1	1	2
9	France	0	1	1	2
11	Hungary	0	1	0	1
11	Sweden	0	1	0	1
13	Belarus	0	0	1	1
Totals (13 entries)		16	16	16	48

=== Juniors ===
Rank	Nation	Gold	Silver	Bronze	Total
1	Finland	5	0	1	6
2	Ukraine	3	4	6	13
3	Poland	3	0	0	3
4	Germany	2	1	0	3
5	Switzerland	2	0	0	2
6	Hungary	1	0	0	1
7	Russia	0	6	2	8
8	Czech Republic	0	2	1	3
9	Croatia	0	1	1	2
10	Belarus	0	1	0	1
10	Italy	0	1	0	1
12	France	0	0	4	4
13	Sweden	0	0	1	1
Totals (13 entries)		16	16	16	48

== See also ==
- European Shooting Confederation
- International Shooting Sport Federation
- List of medalists at the European Shooting Championships
- List of medalists at the European Shotgun Championships
