= 2016 World Running Target Championships =

International sport shooting competition

The 2016 World Running Target Championships was held from 14 until 23 July, 2016 in Suhl, Germany. 24 events were held.

== Medal count ==
* Host nation (Germany)

| Rank | Nation | Gold | Silver | Bronze | Total |
|---|---|---|---|---|---|
| 1 | Ukraine (UKR) | 8 | 2 | 5 | 15 |
| 2 | Russia (RUS) | 3 | 10 | 2 | 15 |
| 3 | China (CHN) | 3 | 1 | 1 | 5 |
| 4 | Sweden (SWE) | 2 | 4 | 1 | 7 |
| 5 | Germany (GER)* | 2 | 1 | 4 | 7 |
| 6 | Finland (FIN) | 2 | 0 | 2 | 4 |
| 7 | North Korea (PRK) | 1 | 3 | 2 | 6 |
| 8 | France (FRA) | 1 | 1 | 3 | 5 |
| 9 | Hungary (HUN) | 1 | 1 | 1 | 3 |
| 10 | Poland (POL) | 1 | 0 | 0 | 1 |
| 11 | Austria (AUT) | 0 | 1 | 0 | 1 |
| 12 | Czech Republic (CZE) | 0 | 0 | 2 | 2 |
| 13 | Norway (NOR) | 0 | 0 | 1 | 1 |
| Totals (13 entries) | | 24 | 24 | 24 | 72 |

== Men ==
| Individual | | | Teams | | | Juniors | | | Junior teams | | |
|---|---|---|---|---|---|---|---|---|---|---|---|
50 metre running target
| 1st place, gold medalist(s) | Maxim Stepanov (RUS) | 590 | 1st place, gold medalist(s) | Russia | 1761 | 1st place, gold medalist(s) | Ihor Kizyma (UKR) | 584 | 1st place, gold medalist(s) | Germany | 1706 |
| 2nd place, silver medalist(s) | Mikhail Azarenko (RUS) | 589 | 2nd place, silver medalist(s) | Hungary | 1746 | 2nd place, silver medalist(s) | Valerii Davydov (RUS) | 580 | 2nd place, silver medalist(s) | Russia | 1695 |
| 3rd place, bronze medalist(s) | Emil Martinsson (SWE) | 587+20+20 | 3rd place, bronze medalist(s) | Czech Republic | 1743 | 3rd place, bronze medalist(s) | Kris Grossheim (GER) | 577 | 3rd place, bronze medalist(s) | France | 1673 |
50 metre running target mixed
| 1st place, gold medalist(s) | Emil Martinsson (SWE) | 396 | 1st place, gold medalist(s) | Russia | 1172 | 1st place, gold medalist(s) | Ihor Kizyma (UKR) | 390 | 1st place, gold medalist(s) | Ukraine | 1148 |
| 2nd place, silver medalist(s) | Jesper Nyberg (SWE) | 393 | 2nd place, silver medalist(s) | Sweden | 1167 | 2nd place, silver medalist(s) | Maksym Babushok (UKR) | 388 | 2nd place, silver medalist(s) | Germany | 1108 |
| 3rd place, bronze medalist(s) | Pak Myong-won (PRK) | 392+20 | 3rd place, bronze medalist(s) | Hungary | 1159 | 3rd place, bronze medalist(s) | Espen Teppdalen Nordsveen (NOR) | 387 | 3rd place, bronze medalist(s) | France | 1096 |
10 metre running target
| 1st place, gold medalist(s) | Lukasz Czapla (POL) | Details | 1st place, gold medalist(s) | Finland | 1718 | 1st place, gold medalist(s) | Nicolas Tranchant (FRA) | Details | 1st place, gold medalist(s) | Ukraine | 1666 |
| 2nd place, silver medalist(s) | Pak Myong-won (PRK) | | 2nd place, silver medalist(s) | Sweden | 1713 | 2nd place, silver medalist(s) | So Kwang (PRK) | | 2nd place, silver medalist(s) | Russia | 1636 |
| 3rd place, bronze medalist(s) | Bedrich Jonas (CZE) | | 3rd place, bronze medalist(s) | Russia | 1712 | 3rd place, bronze medalist(s) | Ihor Kizyma (UKR) | | 3rd place, bronze medalist(s) | Germany | 1618 |
10 metre running target mixed
| 1st place, gold medalist(s) | Emil Martinsson (SWE) | 390 | 1st place, gold medalist(s) | Finland | 1146 | 1st place, gold medalist(s) | So Kwang (PRK) | 383 | 1st place, gold medalist(s) | Germany | 1092 |
| 2nd place, silver medalist(s) | Pak Myong-won (PRK) | 387 | 2nd place, silver medalist(s) | Sweden | 1135 | 2nd place, silver medalist(s) | Raphael Benjamin Rauter (AUT) | 370 | 2nd place, silver medalist(s) | Russia | 1071 |
| 3rd place, bronze medalist(s) | Tomi-Pekka Heikkila (FIN) | 384 | 3rd place, bronze medalist(s) | North Korea | 1134 | 3rd place, bronze medalist(s) | Nicolas Tranchant (FRA) | 367+19 | 3rd place, bronze medalist(s) | Ukraine | 1060 |

=== Men's medal match ===
Semifinals
(579) Pak Myong-won (PRK) | 6
(575) Tomi-Pekka Heikkila (FIN) | 4
(577) Bedrich Jonas (CZE) | 5
(576) Lukasz Czapla (POL) | 7

Final
Pak Myong-won (PRK) | 8
Lukasz Czapla (POL) | 10
Bronze match
Tomi-Pekka Heikkila (FIN) | 2
Bedrich Jonas (CZE) | 6

=== Junior Men's medal match ===
Semifinals
(566) Ihor Kizyma (UKR) | 6
(564) So Kwang (PRK) | 8
(565) Iaroslav Kelpikov (RUS) | 6
(564) Nicolas Tranchant (FRA) | 8

Final
Nicolas Tranchant (FRA) | 6
So Kwang (PRK) | 2
Bronze match
Ihor Kizyma (UKR) | 7
Iaroslav Klepikov (RUS) | 5

== Women ==
| Individual | | | Teams | | | Juniors | | | Junior teams | | |
|---|---|---|---|---|---|---|---|---|---|---|---|
10 metre running target
| 1st place, gold medalist(s) | Galina Avramenko (UKR) | Details | 1st place, gold medalist(s) | China | 1132 | 1st place, gold medalist(s) | Veronika Major (HUN) | Details | 1st place, gold medalist(s) | Ukraine | 1070 |
| 2nd place, silver medalist(s) | Julia Eydenzon (RUS) | | 2nd place, silver medalist(s) | Russia | 1124 | 2nd place, silver medalist(s) | Ke Luqi (CHN) | | 2nd place, silver medalist(s) | Russia | 1059 |
| 3rd place, bronze medalist(s) | Zhao Li Li (CHN) | | 3rd place, bronze medalist(s) | Ukraine | 1119 | 3rd place, bronze medalist(s) | Yuliya Tymoshki (UKR) | | 3rd place, bronze medalist(s) | Germany | 1014 |
10 metre running target mixed
| 1st place, gold medalist(s) | Yang Zeng (CHN) | 388 | 1st place, gold medalist(s) | China | 1141 | 1st place, gold medalist(s) | Darya Rozhiniatovska (UKR) | 368 | 1st place, gold medalist(s) | Ukraine | 1072 |
| 2nd place, silver medalist(s) | Galina Avramenko (UKR) | 385 | 2nd place, silver medalist(s) | Russia | 1128 | 2nd place, silver medalist(s) | Florence Louis (FRA) | 362 | 2nd place, silver medalist(s) | Russia | 1054 |
| 3rd place, bronze medalist(s) | Julia Eydenzon (RUS) | 379 | 3rd place, bronze medalist(s) | Ukraine | 1122 | 3rd place, bronze medalist(s) | Elli Rasanen (FIN) | 358+19 | 3rd place, bronze medalist(s) | Germany | 944 |

=== Women's medal match ===
Semifinals
(383) Zhao Li Li (CHN) | 6
(376) Julia Eydenzon (RUS) | 8
(379) Galina Avramenko (UKR) | 6
(378) Olga Stepanova (RUS) | 4

Final
Julia Eydenzon (RUS) | 4
Galina Avramenko (UKR) | 6
Bronze match
Zhao Li Li (CHN) | 6
Olga Stepanova (RUS) | 4

=== Junior Women's medal match ===
Semifinals
(372) Veronika Major (HUN) | 7
(362) Yuliya Tymoshko (UKR) | 5
(366) Ke Luqi (CHN) | 6
(362) Florence Louis (FRA) | 2

Final
Veronika Major (HUN) | 7
Ke Luqi (CHN) | 5
Bronze match
Yuliya Tymoshko (UKR) | 6
Florence Louis (FRA) | 4

== Competition schedule ==
| Date | Men | Junior men | Women | Junior women |
|---|---|---|---|---|
| Saturday, 16 July | 50 m, slow runs | 50 m, slow runs | | |
| Sunday, 17 July | 50 m, fast runs | 50 m, fast runs | | |
| Monday, 18 July | 50 m mixed | 50 m mixed | | |
| Tuesday, 19 July | 10 m, slow runs | 10 m, slow runs | 10 m, slow runs | 10 m, slow runs |
| Wednesday, 20 July | 10 m, fast runs, medal matches | 10 m, fast runs, medal matches | 10 m, fast runs, medal matches | 10 m, fast runs, medal matches |
| Thursday, 21 July | 10 m mixed | 10 m mixed | | |
| Friday, 22 July | | | 10 m mixed | 10 m mixed |
