= 2009 World Running Target Championships =

International sport shooting competition

The 2009 World Running Target Championships were separate ISSF World Shooting Championships for the running target events, held in August 2009 in Heinola, Finland. Russia dominated, winning 14 of the 20 gold medals.

== Medal count ==
* Host nation (Finland)

Rank	Nation	Gold	Silver	Bronze	Total
1	Russia (RUS)	14	0	6	20
2	Ukraine (UKR)	3	6	6	15
3	Hungary (HUN)	1	2	0	3
4	Sweden (SWE)	1	0	1	2
5	Kazakhstan (KAZ)	1	0	0	1
6	Finland (FIN)*	0	9	1	10
7	Czech Republic (CZE)	0	3	1	4
8	Slovakia (SVK)	0	0	3	3
9	Norway (NOR)	0	0	2	2
Totals (9 entries)		20	20	20	60

== Men ==
Individual			Teams			Juniors			Junior teams		
50 metre running target
1st place, gold medalist(s)	Maxim Stepanov (RUS)	596 EWR	1st place, gold medalist(s)	Russia	1768	1st place, gold medalist(s)	László Boros (HUN)	587	1st place, gold medalist(s)	Russia	1725
2nd place, silver medalist(s)	Krister Holmberg (FIN)	590	2nd place, silver medalist(s)	Finland	1752	2nd place, silver medalist(s)	Tomi-Pekka Heikkilä (FIN)	577+19	2nd place, silver medalist(s)	Finland	1710
3rd place, bronze medalist(s)	Peter Pelach (SVK)	589	3rd place, bronze medalist(s)	Slovakia	1745	3rd place, bronze medalist(s)	Mikhail Azarenko (RUS)	577+18	3rd place, bronze medalist(s)	Ukraine	1689
50 metre running target mixed
1st place, gold medalist(s)	Maxim Stepanov (RUS)	392+37	1st place, gold medalist(s)	Russia	1169	1st place, gold medalist(s)	Yuri Dovgal (RUS)	389	1st place, gold medalist(s)	Russia	1139
2nd place, silver medalist(s)	Staffan Holmström (FIN)	392+36	2nd place, silver medalist(s)	Finland	1168	2nd place, silver medalist(s)	László Boros (HUN)	385	2nd place, silver medalist(s)	Finland	1130
3rd place, bronze medalist(s)	Niklas Bergström (SWE)	391	3rd place, bronze medalist(s)	Czech Republic	1158	3rd place, bronze medalist(s)	Mikhail Azarenko (RUS)	381	3rd place, bronze medalist(s)	Ukraine	1084
10 metre running target
1st place, gold medalist(s)	Emil Martinsson (SWE)	Details	1st place, gold medalist(s)	Russia	1720	1st place, gold medalist(s)	Mikhail Azarenko (RUS)	578	1st place, gold medalist(s)	Russia	1702 WR
2nd place, silver medalist(s)	Vladyslav Prianishnikov (UKR)		2nd place, silver medalist(s)	Czech Republic	1715	2nd place, silver medalist(s)	László Boros (HUN)	571	2nd place, silver medalist(s)	Finland	1665
3rd place, bronze medalist(s)	Dimitry Romanov (RUS)		3rd place, bronze medalist(s)	Ukraine	1701	3rd place, bronze medalist(s)	Aleksandr Naumenko (RUS)	563	3rd place, bronze medalist(s)	Ukraine	1660
10 metre running target mixed
1st place, gold medalist(s)	Dimitry Romanov (RUS)	388	1st place, gold medalist(s)	Russia	1148	1st place, gold medalist(s)	Mikhail Azarenko (RUS)	379	1st place, gold medalist(s)	Russia	1114
2nd place, silver medalist(s)	Miroslav Januš (CZE)	387	2nd place, silver medalist(s)	Czech Republic	1136	2nd place, silver medalist(s)	Igor Matskevych (UKR)	378	2nd place, silver medalist(s)	Finland	1102
3rd place, bronze medalist(s)	Maxim Stepanov (RUS)	384	3rd place, bronze medalist(s)	Slovakia	1129	3rd place, bronze medalist(s)	Tomi-Pekka Heikkilä (FIN)	371	3rd place, bronze medalist(s)	Ukraine	1098

=== Men's medal match ===
Semifinals
(580) Krister Holmberg (FIN)	1
(577) Vladyslav Prianishnikov (UKR)	6
(579) Dimitry Romanov (RUS)	3
(578) Emil Martinsson (SWE)	6

Final
Vladyslav Prianishnikov (UKR)	2
Emil Martinsson (SWE)	6
Bronze match
Krister Holmberg (FIN)	3
Dimitry Romanov (RUS)	6

== Women ==
Individual			Teams	Juniors			Junior teams
10 metre running target
1st place, gold medalist(s)	Galina Avramenko (UKR)	Details	No championship	1st place, gold medalist(s)	Valentyna Gontcharova (UKR)	367	No championship
2nd place, silver medalist(s)	Tetyana Yevseyenko (UKR)		No championship	2nd place, silver medalist(s)	Liudmyla Vasylyuk (UKR)	362	No championship
3rd place, bronze medalist(s)	Viktoriya Zabolotna (UKR)		No championship	3rd place, bronze medalist(s)	Therese Holm (NOR)	354	No championship
10 metre running target mixed
1st place, gold medalist(s)	Natalya Gurova (KAZ)	376	No championship	1st place, gold medalist(s)	Liudmyla Vasylyuk (UKR)	369	No championship
2nd place, silver medalist(s)	Viktoriya Zabolotna (UKR)	375	No championship	2nd place, silver medalist(s)	Valentyna Gontcharova (UKR)	365	No championship
3rd place, bronze medalist(s)	Olga Stepanova (RUS)	373	No championship	3rd place, bronze medalist(s)	Therese Holm (NOR)	350	No championship

=== Women's medal match ===
Semifinals
(384) Galina Avramenko (UKR)	6
(373) Viktoriya Zabolotna (UKR)	2
(379) Olga Stepanova (RUS)	3
(378) Tetyana Yevseyenko (UKR)	6

Final
Galina Avramenko (UKR)	6
Tetyana Yevseyenko (UKR)	5
Bronze match
Viktoriya Zabolotna (UKR)	6
Olga Stepanova (RUS)	4

== Competition schedule ==
Date	Men	Junior men	Women	Junior women
Monday, 24 August	10 m mixed	10 m mixed	10 m mixed	10 m mixed
Tuesday, 25 August	10 m, slow runs	10 m	10 m, slow runs	10 m
Wednesday, 26 August	10 m, fast runs		10 m, fast runs	
Thursday, 27 August	50 m mixed	50 m mixed		
Friday, 28 August	50 m, slow runs	50 m, slow runs		
Saturday, 29 August	50 m, fast runs	50 m, fast runs		
