= 2008 World Running Target Championships =

Shooting competition

The 2008 World Running Target Championships were separate ISSF World Shooting Championships held in Plzeň, the Czech Republic, in October 2008 as a replacement for the lost Olympic status of 10 metre running target. Apart from this event, competitions were also held in 10 metre running target mixed, 50 metre running target and 50 metre running target mixed. The men's and women's regular 10 metre competitions featured the new semifinal and final stages known as medal matches.

Most of the top European shooters, which constitute the majority of the worldwide elite in running target, were present. No shooters from the most successful non-European nation, China, were competing. Russia and Ukraine dominated, winning 19 medals each.

== Schedule ==
Date	Men	Junior men	Women	Junior women
Monday, October 20	10 m RT mixed	10 m RT mixed	10 m RT mixed	10 m RT mixed
Tuesday, October 21	10 m RT (slow runs)	10 m RT	10 m RT (slow runs)	10 m RT
Wednesday, October 22	10 m RT (fast runs + medal match)		10 m RT (fast runs + medal match)	
Thursday, October 23	50 m RT mixed	50 m RT mixed		
Friday, October 24	50 m RT (slow runs)	50 m RT (slow runs)		
Saturday, October 25	50 m RT (fast runs)	50 m RT (fast runs)		

== Medal table ==
* Host nation (Czech Republic)

Rank	Nation	Gold	Silver	Bronze	Total
1	Russia (RUS)	6	8	5	19
2	Ukraine (UKR)	5	7	7	19
3	Czech Republic (CZE)*	4	3	3	10
4	Hungary (HUN)	3	1	4	8
5	Finland (FIN)	2	1	0	3
6	Sweden (SWE)	1	0	2	3
7	Poland (POL)	1	0	0	1
8	Germany (GER)	0	1	1	2
9	Slovakia (SVK)	0	1	0	1
Totals (9 entries)		22	22	22	66

== Results ==
Individual			Teams			Juniors			Junior teams		
Men's 50 metre running target
1st place, gold medalist(s)	Krister Holmberg (FIN)	593	1st place, gold medalist(s)	Czech Republic	1763	1st place, gold medalist(s)	Mikhail Azarenko (RUS)	590	1st place, gold medalist(s)	Czech Republic	1745
2nd place, silver medalist(s)	Maxim Stepanov (RUS)	592+20	2nd place, silver medalist(s)	Russia	1759	2nd place, silver medalist(s)	Igor Matskevych (UKR)	586	2nd place, silver medalist(s)	Ukraine	1742
3rd place, bronze medalist(s)	Miroslav Januš (CZE)	592+19	3rd place, bronze medalist(s)	Ukraine	1758	3rd place, bronze medalist(s)	Aleksiy Vylyvanyy (UKR)	585	3rd place, bronze medalist(s)	Russia	1732
Men's 50 metre running target mixed
1st place, gold medalist(s)	Aleksandr Blinov (RUS)	393+19	1st place, gold medalist(s)	Czech Republic	1169	1st place, gold medalist(s)	Josef Nikl (CZE)	389+20	1st place, gold medalist(s)	Finland	1147
2nd place, silver medalist(s)	Peter Pelach (SVK)	393+17	2nd place, silver medalist(s)	Russia	1164	2nd place, silver medalist(s)	László Boros (HUN)	389+16	2nd place, silver medalist(s)	Ukraine	1143
3rd place, bronze medalist(s)	Alexander Zinenko (UKR)	391	3rd place, bronze medalist(s)	Sweden	1160	3rd place, bronze medalist(s)	Mikhail Azarenko (RUS)	387	3rd place, bronze medalist(s)	Russia	1140
Men's 10 metre running target
1st place, gold medalist(s)	Emil Martinsson (SWE)	Details below	1st place, gold medalist(s)	Ukraine	1726	1st place, gold medalist(s)	László Boros (HUN)	572	1st place, gold medalist(s)	Russia	1698
2nd place, silver medalist(s)	Miroslav Januš (CZE)	Details below	2nd place, silver medalist(s)	Czech Republic	1714	2nd place, silver medalist(s)	Aleksey Bratchikov (RUS)	570	2nd place, silver medalist(s)	Czech Republic	1670
3rd place, bronze medalist(s)	Vladyslav Prianishnikov (UKR)	Details below	3rd place, bronze medalist(s)	Russia	1711	3rd place, bronze medalist(s)	Mikhail Azarenko (RUS)	568	3rd place, bronze medalist(s)	Hungary	1662
Men's 10 metre running target mixed
1st place, gold medalist(s)	Łukasz Czapla (POL)	383+18	1st place, gold medalist(s)	Russia	1137	1st place, gold medalist(s)	Mikhail Azarenko (RUS)	382	1st place, gold medalist(s)	Russia	1109
2nd place, silver medalist(s)	Krister Holmberg (FIN)	383+16	2nd place, silver medalist(s)	Ukraine	1127	2nd place, silver medalist(s)	Aleksey Bratchikov (RUS)	378	2nd place, silver medalist(s)	Germany	1102
3rd place, bronze medalist(s)	Emil Martinsson (SWE)	382	3rd place, bronze medalist(s)	Hungary	1125	3rd place, bronze medalist(s)	Frantisek Losos (CZE)	374	3rd place, bronze medalist(s)	Czech Republic	1091
Women's 10 metre running target
1st place, gold medalist(s)	Galina Avramenko (UKR)	Details below	No team championship			1st place, gold medalist(s)	Bianka Keczeli (HUN)	371	1st place, gold medalist(s)	Ukraine	1080
2nd place, silver medalist(s)	Julia Eydenzon (RUS)	Details below	No team championship			2nd place, silver medalist(s)	Anastasiya Savelyeva (UKR)	368+20	2nd place, silver medalist(s)	Russia	1052
3rd place, bronze medalist(s)	Elena Neff (GER)	Details below	No team championship			3rd place, bronze medalist(s)	Valentyna Honcharova (UKR)	368+18	3rd place, bronze medalist(s)	Hungary	991
Women's 10 metre running target mixed
1st place, gold medalist(s)	Galina Avramenko (UKR)	381	No team championship			1st place, gold medalist(s)	Bianka Keczeli (HUN)	374	1st place, gold medalist(s)	Ukraine	1093
2nd place, silver medalist(s)	Viktoriya Zabolotna (UKR)	376	No team championship			2nd place, silver medalist(s)	Anastasiya Savelyeva (UKR)	368	2nd place, silver medalist(s)	Russia	1048
3rd place, bronze medalist(s)	Kateryna Samohina (UKR)	373	No team championship			3rd place, bronze medalist(s)	Valentyna Honcharova (UKR)	366	3rd place, bronze medalist(s)	Hungary	964

=== Men's medal match ===
Semifinals
(585) Vladyslav Prianishnikov (UKR)	3
(577) Emil Martinsson (SWE)	6
(579) Miroslav Januš (CZE)	6
(578) Niklas Bergström (SWE)	5

Final
Emil Martinsson (SWE)	6
Miroslav Januš (CZE)	1
Bronze match
Vladyslav Prianishnikov (UKR)	6
Niklas Bergström (SWE)	5

=== Women's medal match ===
Semifinals
(382) Galina Avramenko (UKR)	6
(368) Elena Neff (GER)	3
(377) Julia Eydenzon (RUS)	6
(370) Daniela Faust (GER)	5

Final
Galina Avramenko (UKR)	6
Julia Eydenzon (RUS)	2
Bronze match
Elena Neff (GER)	6
Daniela Faust (GER)	2
