= 2020 European 10 m Events Championships =

- Dates: 23 February - 1 March
- Host city: Wrocław, Poland
- Level: Senior
- Events: 4 men + 4 women + 2 mixed

The 2020 European 10 m Events Championships were held in Wrocław, Poland, from 23 February to 1 March 2020.

== Results ==
=== Men ===
Event	Gold	Silver	Bronze
Rifle	István Péni; Hungary (HUN)	Oleh Tsarkov; Ukraine (UKR)	Sergy Rikhter; Israel (ISR)
Rifle team	Russia (RUS); Alexander Dryagin; Sergey Kamenskiy; Vladimir Maslennikov	Croatia (CRO); Petar Gorša; Miran Maričić; Borna Petanjek	France (FRA); Brian Baudouin; Etienne Germond; Alexis Raynaud
Pistol	Artem Chernousov; Russia (RUS)	Paolo Monna; Italy (ITA)	İsmail Keleş; Turkey (TUR)
Pistol team	Russia (RUS); Anton Aristarkhov; Artem Chernousov; Andrei Chilikov	Italy (ITA); Giuseppe Giordano; Paolo Monna; Alessio Torracchi	Serbia (SRB); Dimitrije Grgić; Damir Mikec; Dusko Petrov
Running target	Emil Martinsson; Sweden (SWE)	Mikhail Azarenko; Russia (RUS)	Łukasz Czapla; Poland (POL)
Running target mixed	Jesper Nyberg; Sweden (SWE)	Vladislav Shchepotkin; Russia (RUS)	Mikhail Azarenko; Russia (RUS)
Running target mixed team	Sweden (SWE); Jesper Nyberg; Niklas Bergström; Emil Martinsson	Russia (RUS); Vladislav Shchepotkin; Mikhail Azarenko; Vladislav Prianishnikov	Finland (FIN); Tomi-Pekka Heikkila; Heikki Lahdekorp; Krister Holmberg

=== Women ===
Event	Gold	Silver	Bronze
Rifle	Laura-Georgeta Coman; Romania (ROU)	Anastasiia Galashina; Russia (RUS)	Andrea Arsović; Serbia (SRB)
Rifle team	Russia (RUS); Daria Boldinova; Anastasiia Galashina; Yulia Karimova	Norway (NOR); Jeanette Hegg Duestad; Johanna Reksten; Jenny Stene	Poland (POL); Natalia Kochańska; Agnieszka Nagay; Aneta Stankiewicz
Pistol	Bobana Veličković; Serbia (SRB)	Heidi Diethelm Gerber; Switzerland (SUI)	Anna Korakaki; Greece (GRE)
Pistol team	Serbia (SRB); Zorana Arunović; Jasmina Milovanović; Bobana Veličković	Poland (POL); Beata Bartków-Kwiatkowska; Klaudia Breś; Joanna Tomala	Germany (GER); Andrea Katharina Heckner; Julia Hochmuth; Monika Karsch
Running target	Olga Stepanova; Russia (RUS)	Daniela Vogelbacher; Germany (GER)	Viktoriya Rybovalova; Ukraine (UKR)
Running target mixed	Galina Avramenko; Ukraine (UKR)	Viktoriya Rybovalova; Ukraine (UKR)	Olga Stepanova; Russia (RUS)
Running target mixed team	Russia (RUS); Olga Stepanova; Irina Izmalkova; Julia Eydenzon	Ukraine (UKR); Galina Avramenko; Viktoriya Rybovalova; Valentyna Honcharova	Armenia (ARM); Lilit Mkrtchyan; Gohar Harutyunyan; Arusyak Grigoryan

=== Mixed events ===
Event	Gold	Silver	Bronze
Rifle	Russia (RUS); Vladimir Maslennikov; Yulia Karimova	Hungary (HUN); István Péni; Eszter Dénes	Croatia (CRO); Miran Maričić; Estera Herceg
Pistol	Russia (RUS); Artem Chernousov; Vitalina Batsarashkina	Serbia (SRB); Damir Mikec; Zorana Arunovic	Switzerland (SUI); Jason Solari; Heidi Diethelm Gerber
Running target mixed team	Russia (RUS); Mikhail Azarenko; Julia Eydenzon	Ukraine (UKR); Ihor Kizyma; Halyna Avramenko	Ukraine (UKR); Danylo Danilenko; Viktoriya Rybovalova

== See also ==
- European Shooting Confederation
- International Shooting Sport Federation
- List of medalists at the European Shooting Championships
- List of medalists at the European Shotgun Championships
