= 10 meter running target mixed =

ISSF shooting event

Men
- Number of shots: 2x20
- World Championships: Since 1994
- Abbreviation: 10RTMIX

Women
- Number of shots: 2x20
- World Championships: Since 2002
- Abbreviation: 10RT20MIX

Targets used in ISSF 10 meter running target disciplines

10 meter running target mixed is one of the ISSF shooting events, in which one shoots an airgun at a target that moves sideways. The target is pulled across a two-meter aisle at a range of 10 meters from the firing point. The target is pulled either slow or fast, and it is visible for 5 or 2.5 seconds, respectively. The difference from 10 meter running target is that the slow and the fast runs are fired in a randomized order that is not known beforehand to the shooter.

The course of fire is 40 shots, divided into two 20-shot stages, each consisting of exactly 10 slow and 10 fast runs.

== World Championships, Men ==
| Year | Place | Gold | Silver | Bronze |
|---|---|---|---|---|
| 1994 | (Italy) Milan | Roy Hill (USA) | Miroslav Janus (CZE) | Krister Holmberg (FIN) |
| 1998 | (Spain) Barcelona | Zhiyuan Niu (CHN) | Miroslav Lizal (CZE) | Jury Jourasov (UKR) |
| 2002 | (Finland) Lahti | Jozsef Sike (HUN) | Michael Jakosits (GER) | Adam Saathoff (USA) |
| 2006 | (Croatia) Zagreb | Lukasz Czapla (POL) | Lin Gan (CHN) | Zhiyuan Niu (CHN) |
| 2008 | (Czech Republic) Plzeň | Lukasz Czapla (POL) | Krister Holmberg (FIN) | Emil Martinsson (SWE) |
| 2009 | (Finland) Heinola | Dmitry Romanov (RUS) | Miroslav Januš (CZE) | Maxim Stepanov (RUS) |
| 2010 | (Germany) Munich | Jo Yong Chol (PRK) | Zeng Guobin (CHN) | Jeong You Jin (KOR) |
| 2012 | (Sweden) Stockholm | Josef Nikl (CZE) | László Boros (HUN) | Mikhail Azarenko (RUS) |
| 2014 | (Spain) Granada | Zhai Yujia (CHN) | Emil Martinsson (SWE) | Dmitry Romanov (RUS) |
| 2016 | (Germany) Suhl | Emil Martinsson (SWE) | Pak Myong Won (PRK) | Tomi-Pekka Heikkilä (FIN) |
| 2018 | (South Korea) Changwon | Tomi-Pekka Heikkilä (FIN) | Łukasz Czapla (POL) | Mikhail Azarenko (RUS) |
| 2022 | (France) Châteauroux | Ihor Kizyma (UKR) | Denys Babliuk (UKR) | Emil Martinsson (SWE) |

== World Championships, Men Team ==
| Year | Place | Gold | Silver | Bronze |
|---|---|---|---|---|
| 1994 | (Italy) Milan | (Czech Republic) Czech Republic; Miroslav Januš; Jan Kermiet; Lubos Racansky | (Russia) Russia; Anatoli Asrabaev; Igor Kolesov; Alexander Konichev | United States of America; Roy Hill; Adam Saathoff; Lonn Saunders |
| 1998 | (Spain) Barcelona | (Czech Republic) Czech Republic; Miroslav Lizal; Lubos Racansky; Miroslav Januš | (China) People's Republic of China; Zhiyuan Niu; Ling Yang; Jun Xiao | (Finland) Finland; Krister Holmberg; Vesa Saviahde; Pasi Wedman |
| 2002 | (Finland) Lahti | (Russia) Russia; Dimitri Lykin; Maxim Stepanov; Igor Kolesov | (China) People's Republic of China; Ling Yang; Guobin Zeng; Zhiyuan Niu | (Finland) Finland; Pasi Wedman; Vesa Saviahde; Teppo Koskue |
| 2006 | (Croatia) Zagreb | (China) People's Republic of China; Zhiyuan Niu; Lin Gan; Ling Yang | (Ukraine) Ukraine; Vladyslav Prianishnikov; Oleksandr Ulvak; Andrey Gilchenko | (Sweden) Sweden; Niklas Bergstroem; Emil Martinsson; Sami Pesonen |
| 2008 | (Czech Republic) Plzeň | (Russia) Russia; Dmitry Romanov; Aleksandr Blinov; Maxim Stepanov | (Ukraine) Ukraine; Vladyslav Prianishnikov; Andrey Gilchenko; Alexander Zinenko | (Hungary) Hungary; Jozsef Sike; Tibor Szabo; Tamas Tasi |
| 2009 | (Finland) Heinola | (Russia) Russia; Dmitry Romanov; Alexander Ivanov; Maxim Stepanov | (Czech Republic) Czech Republic; Miroslav Januš; Josef Nikl; Bedrich Jonas | (Slovakia) Slovakia; Peter Planovsky; Peter Pelach; Miroslav Jurco |
| 2010 | (Germany) Munich | (China) China; Zeng Guobin; Zhai Yujia; Yang Ling | (Russia) Russia; Dmitry Romanov; Mikhail Azarenko; Maxim Stepanov | (Slovakia) Slovakia; Peter Planovsky; Peter Pelach; Miroslav Jurco |
| 2012 | (Sweden) Stockholm | (Russia) Russia; Dmitry Romanov; Mikhail Azarenko; Maxim Stepanov | (Ukraine) Ukraine; Yehor Chyrva; Vladislav Prianishnikov; Andrey Gilchenko | (Czech Republic) Czech Republic; Josef Nikl; Bedrich Jonas; Miroslav Januš |
| 2014 | (Spain) Granada | (Russia) Russia; Dmitry Romanov; Alexander Ivanov; Maxim Stepanov | (China) China; Zhai Yujia; Zhang Jie; Xie Duran | (Hungary) Hungary; László Boros; Jozsef Sike; Tamas Tasi |
| 2016 | (Germany) Suhl | (Finland) Finland; Tomi-Pekka Heikkilä; Heikki Lahdekorpi; Krister Holmberg | (Sweden) Sweden; Emil Martinsson; Niklas Bergström; Jesper Nyberg | (North Korea) North Korea; Pak Myong Won; Jo Yong Chol; Ri Yong Hun |
| 2018 | (South Korea) Changwon | (Sweden) Sweden; Jesper Nyberg; Niklas Bergström; Emil Martinsson | (Russia) Russia; Mikhail Azarenko; Maxim Stepanov; Vladislav Prianishnikov | (North Korea) North Korea; Kwon Kwang Il; Jo Yong Chol; Pak Myong Won |
| 2022 | (South Korea) Châteauroux | Sweden | South Korea | Finland |

== World Championships, Women ==
| Year | Place | Gold | Silver | Bronze |
|---|---|---|---|---|
| 2002 | (Finland) Lahti | Audrey Soquet (FRA) | Zhiqi Qiu (CHN) | Xia Wang (CHN) |
| 2006 | (Croatia) Zagreb | Audrey Corenflos (FRA) | Galina Avramenko (UKR) | Aiwen Sun (CHN) |
| 2008 | (Czech Republic) Plzeň | Galina Avramenko (UKR) | Viktoriya Zabolotna (UKR) | Kateryna Samohina (UKR) |
| 2009 | (Finland) Heinola | Natalya Gurova (KAZ) | Viktoriya Zabolotna (UKR) | Olga Stepanova (RUS) |
| 2010 | (Germany) Munich | Li Xueyan (CHN) | Yang Zeng (CHN) | Su Li (CHN) |
| 2012 | (Sweden) Stockholm | Su Li (CHN) | Li Xueyan (CHN) | Galina Avramenko (UKR) |
| 2014 | (Spain) Granada | Su Li (CHN) | Yang Zeng (CHN) | Galina Avramenko (UKR) |
| 2016 | (Germany) Suhl | Yang Zeng (CHN) | Galina Avramenko (UKR) | Julia Eydenzon (RUS) |
| 2018 | (South Korea) Changwon | Su Li (CHN) | Li Xueyan (CHN) | Irina Izmalkova (RUS) |
| 2022 | (France) Châteauroux | Galina Avramenko (UKR) | Nourma Try Indiani (INA) | Arusyak Grigoryan (ARM) |

== World Championships, Women Team ==
| Year | Place | Gold | Silver | Bronze |
|---|---|---|---|---|
| 2002 | (Finland) Lahti | (China) China; Zhiqi Qiu; Xia Wang; Xuan Xu | (Germany) Germany; Silke Johannes; Daniela Faust; Julie Kirr | (Ukraine) Ukraine; Galina Avramenko; Ganna Neustroyeva; Kateryna Samohina |
| 2006 | (Croatia) Zagreb | (Ukraine) Ukraine; Galina Avramenko; Viktoriya Zabolotna; Kateryna Samohina | (China) China; Aiwen Sun; Xuan Xu; Qijue Wang | (Russia) Russia; Anna Ilina; Irina Izmalkova; Julia Eydenzon |
| 2010 | (Germany) Munich | (China) China; Su Li; Li Xueyan; Yang Zeng | (Russia) Russia; Marina Gulak; Julia Eydenzon; Irina Izmalkova | (Ukraine) Ukraine; Galina Avramenko; Viktoriya Rybovalova; Tetanya Davydenko |
| 2012 | (Sweden) Stockholm | (China) China; Su Li; Li Xueyan; Yang Zeng | (Russia) Russia; Olga Stepanova; Julia Eydenzon; Irina Izmalkova | (Ukraine) Ukraine; Galina Avramenko; Viktoriya Rybovalova; Anastasiya Savelyeva |
| 2014 | (Spain) Granada | (China) China; Su Li; Li Xueyan; Yang Zeng | (Russia) Russia; Olga Stepanova; Julia Eydenzon; Irina Izmalkova | (Ukraine) Ukraine; Galina Avramenko; Viktoriya Rybovalova; Kateryna Samohina |
| 2016 | (Germany) Suhl | (China) China; Su Li; Zhao Li Li; Yang Zeng | (Russia) Russia; Olga Stepanova; Julia Eydenzon; Irina Izmalkova | (Ukraine) Ukraine; Galina Avramenko; Viktoriya Rybovalova; Liudmyla Vasylyuk |
| 2018 | (South Korea) Changwon | (China) China; Su Li; Li Xueyan; Huang Qingqing | (Ukraine) Ukraine; Galina Avramenko; Viktoriya Rybovalova; Valentyna Honcharova | (Russia) Russia; Olga Stepanova; Julia Eydenzon; Irina Izmalkova |
| 2022 | (France) Châteauroux | No team event | | |

== World Championships, total medals ==
| Rank | Nation | Gold | Silver | Bronze | Total |
|---|---|---|---|---|---|
| 1 | China | 15 | 11 | 4 | 30 |
| 2 | Russia | 6 | 7 | 9 | 22 |
| 3 | Czech Republic | 3 | 4 | 1 | 8 |
| 4 | Ukraine | 2 | 8 | 9 | 19 |
| 5 | Sweden | 2 | 2 | 2 | 6 |
| 6 | Finland | 2 | 1 | 4 | 7 |
| 7 | Poland | 2 | 1 | 0 | 3 |
| 8 | France | 2 | 0 | 0 | 2 |
| 9 | Hungary | 1 | 1 | 2 | 4 |
| 9 | North Korea | 1 | 1 | 2 | 4 |
| 11 | United States | 1 | 0 | 2 | 3 |
| 12 | Kazakhstan | 1 | 0 | 0 | 1 |
| 13 | Germany | 0 | 2 | 0 | 2 |
| 14 | Slovakia | 0 | 0 | 2 | 2 |
| 15 | South Korea | 0 | 0 | 1 | 1 |
| Totals (15 entries) | | 38 | 38 | 38 | 114 |

== Current world records ==
Current world records in 10 meter running target mixed
| Men | Individual | 393 | Vladyslav Prianishnikov (UKR); Jesper Nyberg (SWE) | February 26, 2008; February 27, 2020 | Winterthur (SUI); Wrocław (POL) |
| Men | Teams | 1158 | Russia (Blinov, Ermolenko, Lykin); China (Gan, Niu, Yang) | March 22, 2002; July 31, 2006 | Thessaloniki (GRE); Zagreb (CRO) |
| Junior Men | Individual | 386 | Dmitry Romanov (RUS); Mikhail Azarenko (RUS) | July 31, 2006; March 5, 2011 | Zagreb (CRO); Brescia (ITA) |
| Junior Men | Teams | 1138 | Ukraine (Gilchenko, Savkin, Zinenko) | March 31, 1996 | Budapest (HUN) |
| Women | Individual | 391 | Su Li (CHN) | September 11, 2018 | Changwon (KOR) |
| Women | Teams | 1158 | China (Li, Yang, Su) | August 5, 2010 | Munich (GER) |
| Junior Women | Individual | 383 | Galina Avramenko (UKR) | November 6, 2003 | Gothenburg (SWE) |
| Junior Women | Teams | 1105 | Russia (Danilenko, Gulak, Stepanova) | July 26, 2006 | Zagreb (CRO) |
