= Adrienn Nemes =

Hungarian sport shooter (born 1991)

Personal information
- National team: Hungary
- Born: 30 December 1991 (age 34) Budapest
- Home town: Budapest
- Height: 156 cm (5 ft 1 in)
- Weight: 81 kg (179 lb)

Sport
- Country: Hungary
- Sport: Shooting Sports
- Events: Air Pistol; 25m Pistol
- Club: USI SE
- Turned pro: 2003
- Coached by: Pal-Plichta Györgyi; Györik Csaba
- Retired: 2022
Medal record
Women's shooting
Representing Hungary
World Championships
Bronze medal – third place	2014 Granada	Air Pistol Team
European Championships
Bronze medal – third place	2011 Brescia	Air Pistol (Junior)
Silver medal – second place	2012 Vierumäki	Air Pistol Team

Adrienn Nemes (born 30 December 1991) is a Hungarian sports shooter. She competes in the 10 Meter Air Pistol and 25 Meter Sport Pistol events. She won a bronze medal at the 2014 World Shooting Championships in the Women's Air Pistol Team event. As a junior, she won a medal at the 2011 European Championships.

== Career ==
Nemes' first major international selection was for the 2006 ISSF World Shooting Championships in Zagreb, where she finished 54th in the Junior Women's Air Pistol.

In 2011 she won the bronze medal for Junior Women's Air Pistol at the 2011 European 10metre Championships in Brescia.

At the 2014 World Championships in Granada, Nemes won Bronze in the 10m Air Pistol Team event with Renáta Tobai-Sike and Zsófia Csonka.

In 2016 Nemes won the Hungarian national championships in the individual and team 25m Pistol events.
