= Yusuf Dikeç =

Turkish sport shooter (born 1973)

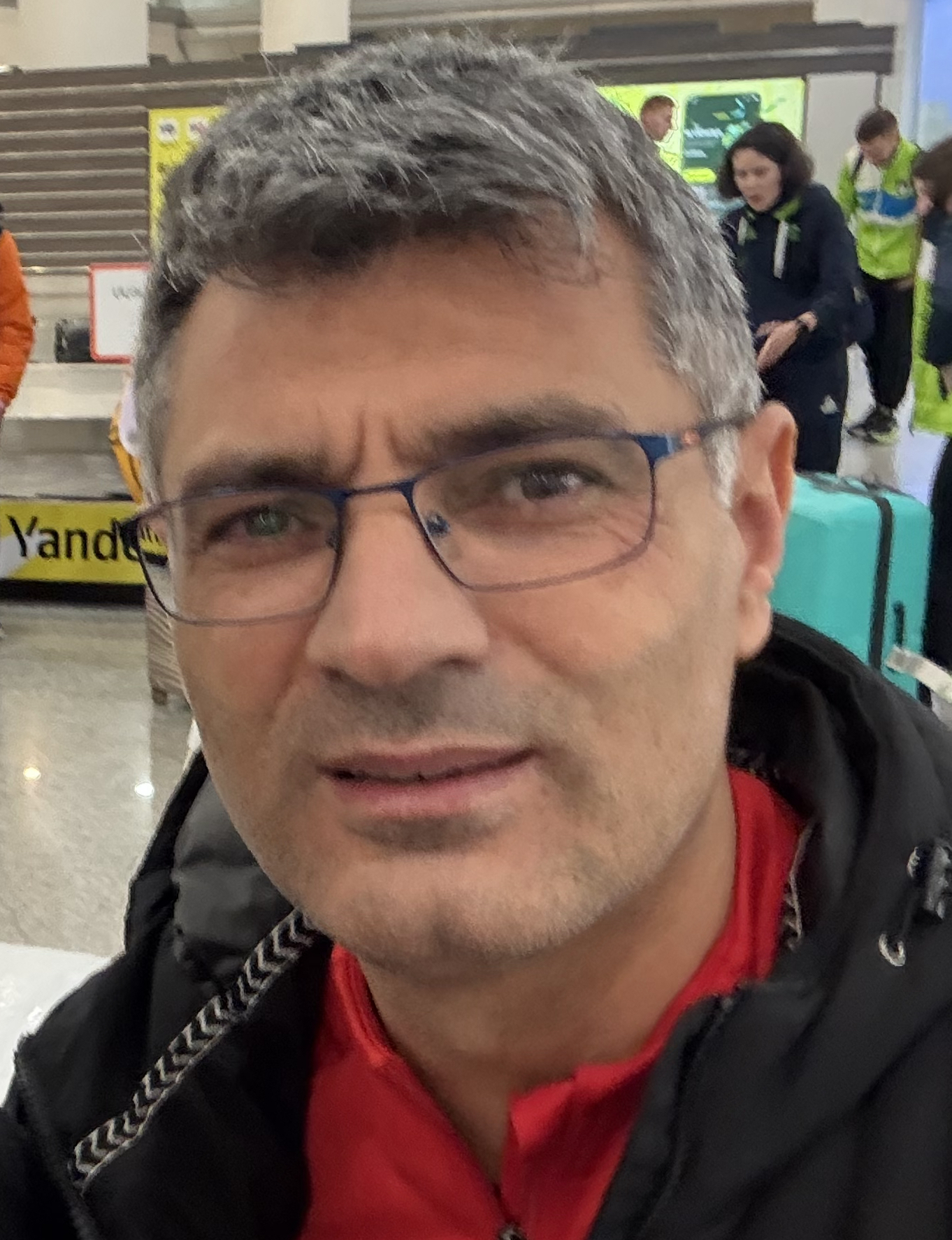
- Dikeç in 2026

Personal information
- Born: 1 January 1973 (age 53) Taşoluk, Göksun, Kahramanmaraş, Turkey
- Education: Military and sport trainer, Gazi University
- Occupation: Gendarmerie NCO
- Years active: 2001–present
- Height: 1.80 m (5 ft 11 in)
- Weight: 80 kg (176 lb)

Sport
- Country: Turkey
- Sport: Air pistol
- Events: 10 m air pistol, 50 m pistol
- Club: Jandarma Gücü
Medal record
Shooting
Representing Turkey
Olympic Games
Silver medal – second place	2024 Paris	10 m air pistol Mixed team
ISSF World Championships
Gold medal – first place	2014 Granada	25 m c-f pistol
Gold medal – first place	2014 Granada	25 m std pistol
Silver medal – second place	2014 Granada	10 m air pistol
Silver medal – second place	2023 Baku	10 m air pistol Mixed team
Bronze medal – third place	2014 Granada	25 m std pistol team
European Games
Silver medal – second place	2023 Kraków-Małopolska	10 m air pistol team
European Championships
Gold medal – first place	2013 Osijek	25 m c-f pistol
Gold medal – first place	2013 Osijek	25 m std pistol
Gold medal – first place	2013 Osijek	25 m c-f pistol team
Gold medal – first place	2016 Győr	pistol
Gold medal – first place	2018 Győr	pistol
Gold medal – first place	2024 Győr	10 m air pistol trio
Gold medal – first place	2025 Osijek	10 m air pistol trio
Gold medal – first place	2025 Osijek	10 m air pistol Mixed team
Gold medal – first place	2026 Yerevan	10 m air pistol trio
Silver medal – second place	2012 Vierumäki	pistol
Silver medal – second place	2012 Vierumäki	pistol team
Silver medal – second place	2013 Osijek	25 m std pistol team
Silver medal – second place	2013 Osijek	50 m pistol team
Silver medal – second place	2024 Győr	10 m air pistol team
Silver medal – second place	2025 Osijek	10 m air pistol solo
Silver medal – second place	2026 Yerevan	10 m air pistol team
Silver medal – second place	2026 Yerevan	10 m air pistol Mixed team
Bronze medal – third place	2021 Osijek	10 m air pistol team
ISSF World Cup
Gold medal – first place	2011 Munich	10 m air pistol
Gold medal – first place	2023 Jakarta	10 m air pistol team
Gold medal – first place	2024 Munich	10 m air pistol Mixed team
Silver medal – second place	2022 Cairo	10 m air pistol team
Silver medal – second place	2025 Munich	10 m air pistol
Bronze medal – third place	2011 Wrocław	10 m air pistol
Bronze medal – third place	2012 Munich	10 m air pistol
Bronze medal – third place	2012 Bangkok	10 m air pistol
Bronze medal – third place	2022 Baku	10 m air pistol Mixed team
CISM World Championships
Gold medal – first place	2006 Rena	25 m c-f pistol
Bronze medal – third place	2010 Zagreb	25 m c-f pistol
Mediterranean Games
Gold medal – first place	2013 Mersin	50 m pistol
Silver medal – second place	2005 Almeria	10 m air pistol
Silver medal – second place	2013 Mersin	10 m air pistol
Military World Games
Silver medal – second place	2007 Hyderabad	Military rapid fire pistol

Yusuf Dikeç (born 1 January 1973) is a Turkish sport shooter who competes in the pistol events and is a multi-time world and European champion. He is a retired non-commissioned officer of the Turkish Gendarmerie and a member of Jandarma Gücü Sports Club. He has been subject to overnight fame and various Internet memes due to his casual attire combined with minimal equipment during the 2024 Summer Olympics in which he won a silver medal in the 10 meter air pistol mixed team event alongside his teammate Şevval İlayda Tarhan. Dikeç used the following expression in his life philosophy on the official Olympic page: "Success doesn't come with your hands in your pockets."

== Early life ==
Dikeç was born in 1973 in Taşoluk village of Göksun district in Kahramanmaraş Province. After his primary schooling in his village, he completed his secondary education in Göksun. In 1994, he enrolled at the Military School of Gendarmerie in Ankara. After graduation, he became a corporal and entered duty in Mardin. In 1999, Dikeç re-entered the Military School of Gendarmerie. After one year, he graduated with the rank of sergeant serving in the Gendarmerie Special Public Security Command. He served one year in Istanbul, and then was appointed to Jandarma Gücü in Ankara, the sports club of the Turkish Gendarmerie.

In 2001, he began sport shooting. Since then, Dikeç competes on the military national team as well as the national team. He was educated in physical education and sports at Gazi University in Ankara.

== Sports career ==
Dikeç became the Turkish champion several times and is the national record holder in different categories of pistol events.

In 2006, he set a new world record in 25 m center-fire pistol event at the CISM Military World Championships held in Rena, Norway, scoring 597 points.

Dikeç won the bronze medal in the 10 metre air pistol event at the 2012 ISSF World Cup Final held in Bangkok, Thailand.

He first participated in the Olympics in Beijing representing Turkey in 2008, at age 35, and competed again in 2012, 2016, 2020, and 2024. He qualified for participation in the 10 m air pistol men's event at the 2012 Summer Olympics. He also took part in the 50 m pistol event without advancing to the final round.

At the 2013 European Shooting Championships held in Osijek, Croatia, from 21 July to 4 August, he became double gold medalist in 25 m standard pistol and 25 m center-fire pistol. He took also a silver medal in the 25 m standard team event with his teammates Fatih Kavruk and Murat Kılınç and another gold medal in the 25 m center-fire pistol team competition. In the 50 m pistol event, he won another silver medal with his teammates Ömer Alimoğlu and İsmail Keleş.

At the 2021 European Shooting Championships in Osijek, Croatia, he won the bronze medal with his teammates Serdar Demirel and İsmail Keleş in the 10 m Air Pistol Team event.

=== 2024 Summer Olympics and going viral ===
Yusuf Dikeç at the 2024 Summer Olympics

Dikeç and his teammate Şevval İlayda Tarhan won the silver medal in the 10 m air pistol Mixed team event at the 2024 Summer Olympics in Paris, losing to the Serbian team of Zorana Arunović and Damir Mikec in the final. He thus became Turkey's oldest ever Olympic medallist, at the age of 51 years and 212 days.

In this event, Dikeç went viral for his "seeming nonchalance" and "noticeably casual vibe". While many of his competitors wore large, bulky ear protectors, visors, and high-tech shooting glasses, Dikeç, at age 51, wore a jersey that resembled an ordinary T-shirt and regular eyeglasses, with barely noticeable earplugs, and shot with one hand casually tucked in his trouser pocket. He was praised on social media for this unusual attitude towards a global sporting event. Dikeç was compared to James Bond or a hitman on social media posts; Variety dubbed him the "Turkish John Wick." Dikeç's casual appearance and his nonchalant pose became the subject of a number of Internet memes and were mimicked by other athletes at the Paris Olympics including Armand Duplantis, Nina Kennedy and Rojé Stona. Dikeç embraced the memes, posting a compilation of them on his Instagram page.

Following the 2024 Summer Olympics, Dikeç sought to register his shooting pose as a trademark in Turkey.

=== 2025 ===
At the 2025 ISSF World Cup in Munich, Germany, he took the silver medal in the 10m air pistol event.

He won the silver medal in the 10m air pistol solo event, and the gold medal with his teammate Şevval İlayda Tarhan in the 10m air pistol mixed team event, and the gold medal with his teammates İsmail Keleş and Buğra Selimzade in the 10m air pistol trio event at the 2025 European 10 m Events Championships in Osijek, Croatia.

== Achievements ==
Representing Turkey
Year	Competition	Venue	Position	Event	Notes
2003	European Military Championships	Plzeň, Czech Republic	2nd		
2004	European Military Championships	Ankara, Turkey	2nd		
2005	XV Mediterranean Games	Almeria, Spain	2nd	10 m air pistol	585
2005	Balkan Championships	Romania	2nd		
2006	CISM World Championships	Rena, Norway	1st	25 m center-fire pistol	597 WR
2007	Military World Games	Hyderabad, India	2nd	25 m rapid-fire pistol	
2007	Military Olympics	Brazil	2nd		
2010	CISM World Championships	Zagreb, Croatia	3rd	25 m center-fire pistol	
2011	ISSF World Cup	Munich, Germany	1st	10 m air pistol	687.3
2011	ISSF World Cup Final	Wrocław, Poland	3rd	10 m air pistol	682.9
2012	ISSF World Cup	Munich, Germany	3rd	10 m air pistol	686.5
2012	ISSF World Cup Final	Bangkok, Thailand	3rd	10 m air pistol	684.5
2012	European Championships	Vierumäki, Finland	2nd	10 m pistol	
2012	European Championships	Vierumäki, Finland	2nd	10 m pistol team	
2013	XVII Mediterranean Games	Mersin, Turkey	2nd	10 m air pistol	577
2013	XVII Mediterranean Games	Mersin, Turkey	1st	50 m pistol	555
2013	European Championships	Osijek, Croatia	1st	25 m center-fire pistol	590
2013	European Championships	Osijek, Croatia	1st	25 m center-fire pistol team	1,741
2013	European Championships	Osijek, Croatia	1st	25 m standard pistol	
2013	European Championships	Osijek, Croatia	2nd	25 m standard pistol team	
2013	European Championships	Osijek, Croatia	2nd	50 m pistol team	1,665
2014	ISSF World Championships	Granada, Spain	1st	25 m center-fire pistol	588
2014	ISSF World Championships	Granada, Spain	1st	25 m standard pistol	581
2014	ISSF World Championships	Granada, Spain	2nd	10 m air pistol	582
2014	ISSF World Championships	Granada, Spain	3rd	25 m standard pistol team	
2016	European Championships	Győr, Hungary	1st	10 m pistol	
2018	European Championships	Győr, Hungary	1st	10 m pistol	241.6
2021	European Championships	Osijek, Croatia	3rd	10 m pistol team	
2022	ISSF World Cup	Cairo, Egypt	2nd	10 m air pistol team	869
2022	ISSF World Cup	Baku, Azerbaijan	3rd	10 m air pistol Mixed team	578
2023	ISSF World Cup	Jakarta, Indonesia	1st	10 m air pistol team	867
2023	European Games	Kraków-Małopolska, Poland	2nd	10 m air pistol team	
2023	ISSF World Championships	Baku, Azerbaijan	2nd	10 m air pistol Mixed team	581
2024	European Championships	Győr, Hungary	1st	10 m pistol trio	
2024	European Championships	Győr, Hungary	2nd	10 m pistol team	
2024	ISSF World Cup	Munich, Germany	1st	10 m air pistol Mixed team	580
2024	Summer Olympic Games	Paris, France	2nd	10 m air pistol Mixed team	
2025	ISSF World Cup	Munich, Germany	2nd	10 m air pistol	
2025	European Championships	Osijek, Croatia	1st	10 m pistol trio	
2025	European Championships	Osijek, Croatia	1st	10 m pistol Mixed team	
2025	European Championships	Osijek, Croatia	2nd	10 m pistol solo	

== See also ==
- Kim Ye-ji (sport shooter) – South Korean Olympian (born 1992)
