= Andrea Arsović =

Serbian sport shooter (born 1987)

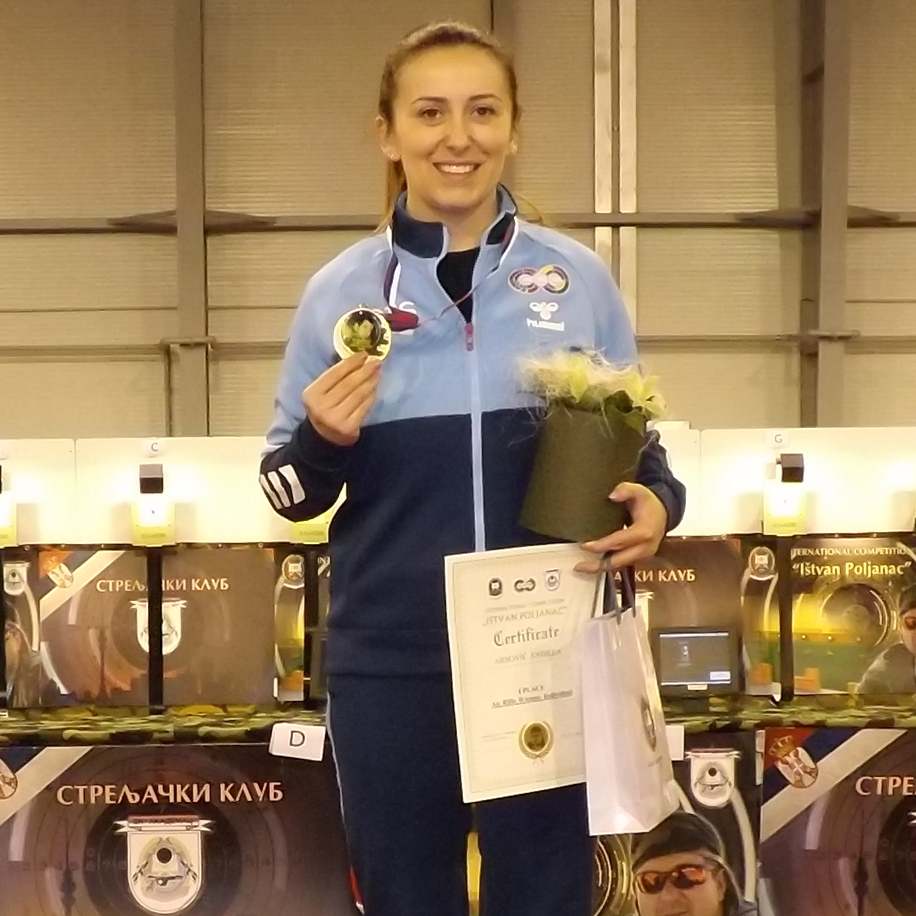

Personal information
- Born: 5 February 1987 (age 39) Titov Drvar, SR Bosnia and Herzegovina, SFR Yugoslavia
- Height: 1.65 m (5 ft 5 in)
- Weight: 60 kg (132 lb; 9 st 6 lb)
- Website: Website

Sport
- Sport: Sport shooting
- Club: JSD Partizan
- Coached by: Dragan Donević
Medal record
Women's shooting
Representing Serbia
World Championships
Bronze medal – third place	2010 Munich	50m rifle TP team
Bronze medal – third place	2014 Granada	10m air rifle team
European Games
Gold medal – first place	2015 Baku	10m air rifle
European Championships
Gold medal – first place	2010 Meråker	10m air rifle
Gold medal – first place	2014 Moscow	10m air rifle team
Gold medal – first place	2015 Arnhem	10m air rifle mixed team
Gold medal – first place	2016 Győr	10m air rifle
Gold medal – first place	2016 Győr	10m air rifle mixed team
Gold medal – first place	2017 Maribor	10m air rifle mixed team
Silver medal – second place	2012 Vierumäki	10m air rifle team
Silver medal – second place	2014 Moscow	10m air rifle
Silver medal – second place	2018 Győr	10m air rifle mixed team
Bronze medal – third place	2012 Vierumäki	10m air rifle
Bronze medal – third place	2020 Wrocław	10m air rifle
Mediterranean Games
Gold medal – first place	2009 Pescara	10m air rifle
Gold medal – first place	2018 Tarragona	10m air rifle
Silver medal – second place	2022 Oran	10 m air rifle mixed team
Bronze medal – third place	2013 Mersin	50m rifle TP

Andrea Arsović (Serbian Cyrillic: Андреа Арсовић, born 5 February 1987) is a Serbian sport shooter. She won a gold medal in the 10m air rifle at the 2015 European Games and is also a two-time European champion in the same discipline as well as a three-time champion in mixed team and once in women's team. Arsović won a gold medal at the 2009 and 2018 Mediterranean Games.

At the 2014 World Championship she won a bronze medal in team competition and finished in 5th place in 10m air rifle, securing a first quota for Serbia for the 2016 Summer Olympics.

She competed in the Women's 10 metre air rifle and women's 50 metre three positions events at the 2012 Summer Olympics. She competed in the same events at the 2016 Rio Olympic Games. At the Tokyo Olympic Games, she qualified for the 50m rifle three positions final, where she finished in eighth place.

She was named Belgrade's Best Female Athlete of 2020 by the Belgrade Sports Association
