= Kateryna Samohina =

Ukrainian sport shooter

Personal information
- National team: Ukraine
- Born: 20 November 1977 (age 48) Chernihiv, Ukraine
- Height: 164 cm (5 ft 5 in)
- Weight: 55 kg (121 lb)

Sport
- Country: Ukraine
- Sport: Shooting sport
- Events: 10 meter running target; 10 meter running target mixed
- Coached by: Galina Nazarenko
Medal record
Representing Ukraine
ISSF World Shooting Championships
Silver medal – second place	Lahti 2002	10m running target team
Bronze medal – third place	Lahti 2002	10m running target mixed team
Gold medal – first place	Zagreb 2006	10m running target mixed team
Silver medal – second place	Zagreb 2006	10m running target team
Bronze medal – third place	Plzeň 2008	10m running target mixed
Bronze medal – third place	Granada 2014	10m running target mixed team
European Shooting Championships
Silver medal – second place	Deauville 2007	10m running target team
Silver medal – second place	Odense 2013	10m running target team
Silver medal – second place	Moscow 2014	10m running target team

Kateryna Samohina (born 20 November 1977) is a Ukrainian target shooter. She competes in the ISSF 10meter running target events. She won a bronze medal at the 2008 World Running Target Championships in the 10m running target mixed event. She has won multiple team medals including a gold medal at the 2006 World Championships.
