= Vladimir Maslennikov =

Russian sports shooter (born 1994)

Personal information
- Full name: Vladimir Anatolyevich Maslennikov
- Nationality: Russian
- Born: 17 August 1994 (age 31) Lesnoy, Russia
- Height: 1.71 m (5 ft 7 in)
- Weight: 73 kg (161 lb)

Sport
- Country: Russia
- Sport: Sports shooting
- Event: Air rifle
Medal record
Men's Shooting
Representing Russia
Olympic Games
Bronze medal – third place	2016 Rio de Janeiro	10 m rifle
World Championships
Gold medal – first place	2018 Changwon	50 m team rifle 3 positions
Silver medal – second place	2018 Changwon	10 m team air rifle
Bronze medal – third place	2018 Changwon	Mixed 10 m air rifle
European Championships
Gold medal – first place	2018 Győr	Rifle
Gold medal – first place	2018 Győr	Rifle team
Gold medal – first place	2018 Győr	Rifle mixed team
Gold medal – first place	2017 Maribor	Rifle
Gold medal – first place	2017 Maribor	Rifle team
Gold medal – first place	2020 Wroclaw	Rifle team
Gold medal – first place	2020 Wroclaw	Rifle mixed team
Gold medal – first place	2021 Osijek	10 m air rifle team
Silver medal – second place	2017 Maribor	Rifle mixed team
Silver medal – second place	2021 Osijek	10 m air rifle mixed
Bronze medal – third place	2021 Osijek	10 m air rifle
European Games
Silver medal – second place	2019 Minsk	Mixed 10 m air rifle

Vladimir Anatolyevich Maslennikov (Russian: Владимир Анатольевич Масленников; born 17 August 1994) is a Russian sports shooter. He won the bronze medal in the men's 10 metre air rifle event at the 2016 Summer Olympics.
