= Stine Nielsen =

Danish sports shooter (born 1991)

Personal information
- Nationality: Danish
- Born: 9 February 1991 (age 35) Årslev, Faaborg-Midtfyn, Funen, Denmark
- Height: 1.63 m (5 ft 4 in)
- Weight: 81 kg (179 lb)

Sport
- Country: Denmark
- Sport: Sports shooting
- Event: Air rifle
Medal record
Women's shooting
Representing Denmark
World Championships
Silver medal – second place	2018 Changwon	50 m team rifle prone
Silver medal – second place	2018 Changwon	50 m team rifle 3 positions
European Games
Silver medal – second place	2015 Baku	Mixed team 10 m air rifle
European Championships
Gold medal – first place	2018 Győr	10 m air rifle
Silver medal – second place	2017 Maribor	10 m air rifle
Silver medal – second place	2018 Győr	Team 10 m air rifle

Stine Nielsen (born 9 February 1991) is a Danish sports shooter. She competed in the Women's 10 metre air rifle and women's 50 m 3 positions events at the 2012 and 2016 Summer Olympics.

She won the junior World title in the 50 m rifle 3 positions in 2010, and gold at the 2018 European Championships in the 10 m air rifle. She won silver in the same event at the 2017 European Championships.
