= Matthew Thomson (sport shooter) =

British sport shooter (born 1986)

Personal information
- National team: Great Britain
- Citizenship: British
- Born: 11 January 1986 (age 40) Edinburgh
- Home town: Edinburgh
- Education: University of Edinburgh
- Years active: 2004–2013
- Height: 181 cm (5 ft 11 in)
- Weight: 83 kg (183 lb)

Sport
- Sport: Shooting sport
- Event: 50 metre rifle prone
- Club: Watsonian's Rifle Club
- Coached by: Donald McIntosh
Medal record
Men's shooting
Representing Great Britain
Event / 1st / 2nd / 3rd; World Shooting Championships / 2 / - / -
ISSF World Shooting Championships
Gold medal – first place	2006 Zagreb	50 metre rifle prone Junior Individual
Gold medal – first place	2006 Zagreb	50 metre rifle prone Junior Team
- Updated on 24 October 2016

Matthew Thomson (born 11 January 1986) is a 50 m Rifle shooter who won two gold medals at the 2006 ISSF World Shooting Championships. He won gold for the Junior Men's Prone competition with a score of 593 and also led the British Junior Men's team to its first gold in 24 years.

== Career ==
Thomson began his career in 1996 as a school boy with the Watsonian shooting club. While at university, he was involved with the University of Edinburgh rifle club as well as maintaining his link with Watsonians.

His career has taken him around the world where he has competed in Nordic, European and World competitions, as well as being crowned Scottish Senior Men's Prone Champion in 2004 and claiming the Scottish Junior Men's Prone Championship in both 2004 and 2005.

Thomson received his first GB Cap in 2004 as a Junior, representing Great Britain at the European Shooting Championships in the Junior Men's 50M Rifle Prone where he placed 29th. In 2006 he won the Junior Men's 50M Rifle Prone event at the 2006 World Shooting Championships, making him the World Junior Men's Prone Champion. He was also part of the Junior Men's Prone Team who won Britain's first Junior Team Gold in 24 years. Later in the year he went on to become the British Universities Long Range Champion at the 2006 BUSA Smallbore Rifle Championships.

In 2008 he won his first senior international medal when he won the Men's Prone at ISAS in Dortmund.

In 2012, Thomson won Bronze at the International Shooting Competition of Hannover whilst representing Great Britain. The Men's Prone Team comprising Thomson, James Huckle and Neil Stirton also took Silver.

=== Junior ===
- Scottish Men's Prone Champion 2004 & 2005
- World Junior Men's Prone Champion, 2006

=== Senior ===
- Scottish Men's Prone Champion 2004
- International Start of Season Match (ISAS) Men's Prone Champion 2008
