= İsmail Keleş =

Turkish sport shooter (born 1988)

Personal information
- Nationality: Turkish
- Born: 5 March 1988 (age 38) Ankara, Turkey
- Education: Military
- Occupation: Gendarmerie officer
- Years active: 2007-present
- Height: 1.68 m (5 ft 6 in)
- Weight: 72 kg (159 lb)

Sport
- Country: Turkey
- Sport: Air pistol
- Events: 10 m air pistol, 50 m pistol
- Club: Jandarma Gücü
- Coached by: Hüseyin TOSUN
Medal record
Shooting
Representing Turkey
European Games
Gold medal – first place	2023 Kraków-Małopolska	10 m air pistol
Silver medal – second place	2023 Kraków-Małopolska	10 m air pistol team
European Championships
Gold medal – first place	2024 Győr	10 m air pistol trio
Gold medal – first place	2025 Osijek	10 m air pistol trio
Gold medal – first place	2026 Yerevan	10 m air pistol trio
Silver medal – second place	2012 Vierumäki	10 m air pistol team
Silver medal – second place	2013 Osijek	50 m pistol team
Silver medal – second place	2024 Győr	10 m air pistol team
Silver medal – second place	2025 Châteauroux	50 m pistol team
Silver medal – second place	2026 Yerevan	10 m air pistol team
Bronze medal – third place	2017 Maribor	10 m air pistol
Bronze medal – third place	2020 Wrocław	10 m air pistol
Bronze medal – third place	2021 Osijek	10 m air pistol team
Bronze medal – third place	2025 Châteauroux	25 m Standard Pistol Team
Mediterranean Games
Gold medal – first place	2026 Taranto	10 m air pistol
Gold medal – first place	2026 Taranto	10 m air pistol mixed team
Silver medal – second place	2022 Oran	10 m air pistol
ISSF World Cup
Silver medal – second place	2012 Milan	10 m air pistol
Silver medal – second place	2016 Munich	10 m air pistol
Bronze medal – third place	2016 Bologna	10 m air pistol

İsmail Keleş (born 5 March 1988 in Ankara) is a Turkish sport shooter competing in the pistol events. By profession an officer in the rank of First lieutenant at the Turkish Gendarmerie, the 1.68 m (5 ft 6 in) tall athlete at 72 kg (159 lb), is a member of Jandarma Gücü Sports Club, where he is coached by Muhammed Topal.

== Career ==
Keleş began with sport shooting in 2007. He has competed since 2008.

He qualified for participation in the 10 m air pistol men event at the 2012 Summer Olympics after he won the silver medal at the 2012 ISSF World Cup held in Milan, Italy. He also competed in the 50 m pistol at the 2012 Summer Olympics.

At the 2013 European Shooting Championships held in Osijek, Croatia from 21 July to 4 August, he won the silver in the 50 m pistol event together with his team mates Ömer Alimoğlu and Yusuf Dikeç.

He competed at the 2016 Summer Olympics in the 10 and 50 m pistol.

He won the gold medal with his teammates Yusuf Dikeç and Buğra Selimzade in the 10m air pistol trio event at the 2025 European 10 m Events Championships in Osijek, Croatia.

== Achievements ==
Year	Competition	Venue	Position	Event	Notes
2012	ISSF World Cup	Milan, Italy	2nd	10 m pistol	
2012	European Championships	Vierumäki, Finland	2nd	10 m pistol team	
2013	European Championships	Osijek, Croatia	2nd	50 m pistol team	1,665
2016	ISSF World Cup	Munich, Germany	2nd	10 m pistol	585
2016	ISSF World Cup	Bologna, Italy	3rd	10 m pistol	
2017	European Championships	Maribor, Slovenia	3rd	10 m pistol	
2020	European Championships	Wrocław, Poland	3rd	10 m pistol	
2021	European Championships	Osijek, Croatia	3rd	10 m pistol team	
2022	Mediterranean Games	Oran, Algeria	2nd	10 m pistol	
2023	European Games	Wrocław, Poland	1st	10 m pistol	
2023	European Games	Wrocław, Poland	2nd	10 m pistol team	
2024	European Championships	Győr, Hungary	1st	10 m pistol trio	
2024	European Championships	Győr, Hungary	2nd	10 m pistol team	
2025	European Championships	Osijek, Croatia	1st	10 m pistol trio	
