= Streljački Klub Partizan =

Shooting club in Belgrade, Serbia

SK Partizan
- Founded: 27 May 1959; 67 years ago
- Colors: Black and white
- Website: partizanshooting.com

Streljački klub Partizan (Serbian Cyrillic: Стрељачки клуб Партизан, transl. Partizan Shooting Club), usually referred to as SK Partizan or simply Partizan, is a shooting club based in Belgrade, Serbia and a part of the Partizan multi-sports club.

The club celebrated its 50th anniversary in 2009.

== History ==
The club was founded on 27 May 1959. The biggest success of the club was when its member got the gold medal at the 1988 Summer Olympics in Seoul, setting the world record on the way.

== Honors ==
The club and its members have achieved significant results over the years...

- Olympic Games – Gold medal with Olympic record by Goran Maksimović
- World Championships – 3 gold, 3 silver and 4 bronze medals
  - Four World Records
- European Championships – 16 gold, 11 silver and 8 bronze medals
- Balkan Championships – 52 gold, 52 silver, and 50 bronze medals
  - 14 Balkan Records
- Yugoslav Championship – 172 gold medals
