= Zorana Arunović =

Serbian sport shooter (born 1986)

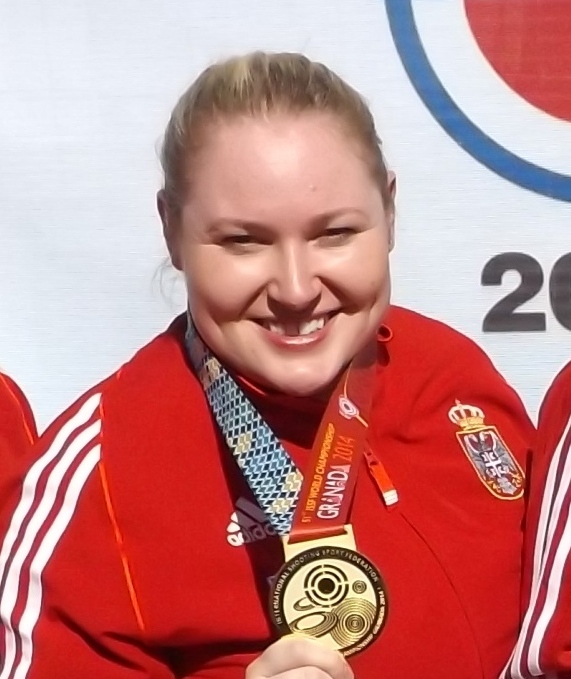
- Arunović in 2015

Personal information
- Nationality: Serbian
- Born: 22 November 1986 (age 39) Belgrade, Serbia, Yugoslavia
- Height: 1.67 m (5 ft 6 in)
- Weight: 75 kg (165 lb)

Sport
- Country: Serbia
- Sport: Shooting
- Rank: No. 1 (September 2010)
- Event: Air pistol
Medal record
Women's shooting
Representing Serbia
Olympic Games
| Gold medal – first place | 2024 Paris | 10m air pistol mixed team |
World Championships
| Gold medal – first place | 2010 Munich | 10m air pistol |
| Gold medal – first place | 2014 Granada | 10m air pistol team |
| Silver medal – second place | 2010 Munich | 25m pistol |
| Silver medal – second place | 2010 Munich | 25m pistol team |
| Silver medal – second place | 2018 Changwon | 10m air pistol |
| Bronze medal – third place | 2022 Cairo | 10m air pistol |
European Games
| Gold medal – first place | 2015 Baku | 10m air pistol |
| Gold medal – first place | 2019 Minsk | 10m air pistol |
| Silver medal – second place | 2019 Minsk | 10m air pistol mixed team |
European Championships
| Gold medal – first place | 2010 Meråker | 10m air pistol team |
| Gold medal – first place | 2011 Brescia | 10m air pistol team |
| Gold medal – first place | 2013 Odense | 10m air pistol team |
| Gold medal – first place | 2016 Győr | 10m air pistol mixed team |
| Gold medal – first place | 2017 Maribor | 10m air pistol |
| Gold medal – first place | 2017 Maribor | 10m air pistol team |
| Gold medal – first place | 2017 Maribor | 10m air pistol mixed team |
| Gold medal – first place | 2020 Wrocław | 10m air pistol team |
| Gold medal – first place | 2022 Hamar | 10m air pistol team |
| Silver medal – second place | 2013 Odense | 10m air pistol mixed team |
| Silver medal – second place | 2016 Győr | 10m air pistol team |
| Silver medal – second place | 2018 Győr | 10m air pistol |
| Silver medal – second place | 2018 Győr | 10m air pistol mixed team |
| Silver medal – second place | 2020 Wrocław | 10m air pistol mixed team |
| Silver medal – second place | 2021 Osijek | 10m air pistol mixed team |
| Silver medal – second place | 2022 Hamar | 10m air pistol |
| Silver medal – second place | 2025 Osijek | 10m air pistol |
| Bronze medal – third place | 2012 Vierumäki | 10m air pistol team |
| Bronze medal – third place | 2013 Osijek | 25m pistol team |
| Bronze medal – third place | 2016 Győr | 10m air pistol |
| Bronze medal – third place | 2018 Győr | 10m air pistol team |
| Bronze medal – third place | 2019 Osijek | 10m air pistol mixed team |
| Bronze medal – third place | 2021 Osijek | 10m air pistol team |
| Bronze medal – third place | 2022 Hamar | 10m air pistol mixed team |
| Bronze medal – third place | 2024 Győr | 10 m air pistol |
| Bronze medal – third place | 2025 Osijek | 10m air pistol mixed team |
Mediterranean Games
| Gold medal – first place | 2009 Pescara | 10m air pistol |
| Gold medal – first place | 2013 Mersin | 25m pistol |
| Gold medal – first place | 2022 Oran | 10m air pistol mixed team |
| Gold medal – first place | 2026 Taranto | 10 m air pistol |
| Silver medal – second place | 2013 Mersin | 10m air pistol |
| Silver medal – second place | 2018 Tarragona | 10m air pistol |
| Bronze medal – third place | 2022 Oran | 10m air pistol |
| Bronze medal – third place | 2026 Taranto | 10 m air pistol mixed team |
Universiade
| Silver medal – second place | 2011 Shenzhen | 25m pistol |

Zorana Arunović (Serbian Cyrillic: Зорана Аруновић; born 22 November 1986) is a Serbian retired sport shooter. She won 10 metre air pistol event at the 2010 World Shooting Championships and was later named Serbian Sportswoman of The Year by the Olympic Committee of Serbia. She also won individual gold medals in 10 m air pistol event at 2017 European Championships, and 2015 and 2019 European Games. She won Serbia's gold medal in shooting at the Olympics in 2024 with Damir Mikec in the 10 meter air pistol mixed category. She retired in 2026.

== Career ==
Arunović became interested in shooting because of her older sister Jelena. She began to train in 2001 at the shooting club Policajac, and later moved to SK Crvena Zvezda.

She won silver team medal in Junior event at the European 10 m Events Championships in 2004 in Győr, and bronze team medal the following year in Tallinn, respectively. She won individual and team gold in the same event in 2006 in Moscow. Later in the year, Arunović won individual gold in 25 m pistol and team bronze in 10 m air pistol in Junior events at the 2006 World Shooting Championships in Zagreb. At the 2009 Mediterranean Games in Pescara, she won gold medal in 10 m air pistol.

Arunović made breakthrough in 2010, when she won individual gold medal in 10 m air pistol, and both individual and team silver in 25 m pistol, alongside her sister Jelena and legendary sports shooter Jasna Šekarić, at the 2010 World Shooting Championships in Munich. The win also made her the first woman athlete to secure quota for Serbia for the London 2012 Summer Olympics. In September 2010, she climbed to first place in the ISSF world ranking in women's 10 m air pistol. At the end of the year, she was named Serbian Sportswoman of The Year by the Olympic Committee of Serbia. Arunović received Serbia's sport association "May award" in 2011. She won a silver medal in 25 m pistol at the 2011 Summer Universiade in Shenzhen.

Arunović finished 4th in Women's 25 metre pistol and 7th in Women's 10 metre air pistol at the 2012 Summer Olympics in London.

She competed at the 2016 Summer Olympics in Rio in the Women's 10 metre air pistol and Women's 25 metre pistol, but failed to progress to the final.

In 2021, she competed in three events at the 2020 Summer Olympics in Tokyo, including new Mixed 10 metre air pistol team event, where she teamed up with longtime partner Damir Mikec to finish in 4th place.

Arunović won individual bronze medal in 10 m air pistol at the 2022 World Shooting Championships in Cairo, to secure first quota for Serbia for the Paris 2024 Summer Olympics, just as she did for the previous Olympic Games, when she qualified by winning individual silver medal at the 2018 World Shooting Championships.

At the 2024 Summer Olympics, she competed in both the Women's 10 metre air pistol, where she placed tenth, and the Mixed 10 metre air pistol team, where she finished in first alongside Damir Mikec.

She announced her retirement in late September 2026.

=== Olympic results ===
| Event | 2012 | 2016 | 2020 | 2024 |
|---|---|---|---|---|
| 25 metre pistol | 4th 787.3 | 19th 576 | 9th 584 | - |
| 10 metre air pistol | 7th 385+98.5 | 11th 382 | 17th 573 | 10th 575 |
| 10 metre air pistol mixed team | - | - | 4th | 1st |

== Records ==
Current world records held in 10 m Air Pistol
| Women | Final | 246.9 | Zorana Arunović (SRB) | March 11, 2017 | ECH Maribor (SLO) |

== Personal life ==
She has studied Ukrainian, Russian, and English.

Records
| Preceded by (India) Heena Sidhu | Women's 10m air pistol final world record holder March 11, 2017 – | Succeeded by Incumbent |
