= 2006 ISSF World Shooting Championships =

International sport shooting competition

The 49th ISSF World Shooting Championships were held in Zagreb, Croatia from July 22, 2006, to August 5, 2006.

Medal count – World records – Men's rifle events – Women's rifle events – Men's pistol events – Women's pistol events
Men's shotgun events – Women's shotgun events – Men's running target events – Women's running target events – References

== Medal count ==
Rank	Country	Gold	Silver	Bronze	Total
1	China	32	14	8	54
2	Russia	24	19	16	59
3	United States	6	2	6	14
4	Germany	5	7	6	18
5	France	4	5	5	14
6	Czech Republic	3	6	5	14
7	Norway	3	4	4	11
8	Great Britain	3	2	0	5
9	India	3	1	2	6
10	Poland	3	1	1	5
11	Italy	2	8	5	15
12	South Korea	2	6	4	12
13	Ukraine	2	4	6	12
14	North Korea	2	4	4	10
15	Belarus	2	3	1	6
16	Serbia and Montenegro	2	1	2	5
17	Austria	1	3	3	7
18	Hungary	1	2	3	6
19	Kazakhstan	1	1	2	4
20	Denmark	1	0	3	4
21	Canada	1	0	0	1
21	Estonia	1	0	0	1
21	Kuwait	1	0	0	1
24	Sweden	0	3	4	7
25	Bulgaria	0	2	0	2
26	Slovakia	0	1	3	4
26	Thailand	0	1	3	4
28	Israel	0	1	1	2
28	Switzerland	0	1	1	2
30	Croatia	0	1	0	1
30	Romania	0	1	0	1
30	Spain	0	1	0	1
33	Australia	0	0	2	2
34	Finland	0	0	1	1
34	Japan	0	0	1	1
34	Mongolia	0	0	1	1
34	Slovenia	0	0	1	1
34	United Arab Emirates	0	0	1	1

== World records ==
A total of 15 world records were bettered or equalled during the championships.

Event	Score	Competitor	Nationality
Men's individual world records
300 m Rifle Three Positions	1181	Espen Berg-Knutsen	Norway
10 m Running Target Mixed	391 (Equalled)	Lukasz Czapla	Poland
Women's individual world records
300 m Rifle Three Positions	588 (Equalled)	Charlotte Jakobsen	Denmark
50 m Rifle Prone	597 (Equalled)	Olga Dovgun	Kazakhstan
Junior Men's individual world records
10 m Running Target Mixed	386	Dmitry Romanov	Russia
Junior Women's individual world records
Men's team world records
300 m Rifle Three Positions	3517	Norway	
25 m Rapid Fire Pistol	1743	China	
Skeet:	365	Italy	
10 m Running Target Mixed	1158 (Equalled)	China	
Women's team world records
300 m Rifle Prone	1776	United States	
Skeet	211	United States	
Junior Men's team world records
10 m Air Pistol	1726 (Equalled)	China	
Skeet	348	United States	
Junior Women's team world records
10 m Running Target	1116	Germany	
10 m Running Target Mixed	1105	Russia	

== Rifle events ==
=== Men ===
Pos	Individual			Team		Junior			Junior Team	
Men's 300 m Rifle Three Positions
Gold	Espen Berg-Knutsen	Norway	1181	Norway	3517					
Silver	Vebjørn Berg	Norway	1178	Austria	3514					
Bronze	Mario Knoegler	Austria	1178	Sweden	3503					
Men's 300 m Rifle Prone
Gold	Lubos Opelka	Czech Republic	599	Norway	1792					
Silver	Péter Sidi	Hungary	599	Sweden	1790					
Bronze	Rajmond Debevec	Slovenia	598	Australia	1787					
Men's 300 m Standard Rifle
Gold	Thomas Farnik	Austria	586	Belarus	1749					
Silver	Per Sandberg	Sweden	584	Norway	1747					
Bronze	Vebjørn Berg	Norway	584	United States	1741					
Men's 50 m Rifle Three Positions
Gold	Artem Khadjibekov	Russia	1273.5	Russia	3498	Cao Yifei	China	1158	China	3451
Silver	Stevan Pletikosić	Serbia and Montenegro	1269.1	Austria	3482	Vaclav Haman	Czech Republic	1156	Germany	3435
Bronze	Zhang Lei	China	1268.4	United States	3482	Daniel Brodmeier	Germany	1155	United States	3431
Men's 50 m Rifle Prone
Gold	Sergei Martynov	Belarus	702.1	United States	1786	Matthew Thomson	United Kingdom	593	United Kingdom	1764
Silver	Youri Sukhorukov	Ukraine	700.9	Austria	1779	Daniel Brodmeier	Germany	592	United States	1759
Bronze	Marco De Nicolo	Italy	700.6	Hungary	1779	Stefan Raser	Austria	592	Germany	1759
Men's 10 m Air Rifle
Gold	Abhinav Bindra	India	699.1	China	1783	Navanath Bhanud Faratade	India	596	China	1769
Silver	Alin George Moldoveanu	Romania	698.3	Russia	1783	Petar Gorsa	Croatia	595	Italy	1767
Bronze	Zhu Qinan	China	697.9	Austria	1782	Cao Yifei	China	593	South Korea	1766

=== Women ===
Pos	Individual			Team		Junior			Junior Team	
Women's 300 m Rifle Three Positions
Gold	Charlotte Jakobsen	Denmark	588	France	1723					
Silver	Tatsiana Kasiantsova	Belarus	580	Switzerland	1717					
Bronze	Isabelle Grigorian	France	578	Denmark	1713					
Women's 300 m Rifle Prone
Gold	Solveig Bibard	France	595	United States	1776					
Silver	Marina Giannini	Italy	594	France	1773					
Bronze	Charlotte Jakobsen	Denmark	593	Denmark	1757					
Women's 50 m Rifle Three Positions
Gold	Lioubov Galkina	Russia	684.3	Russia	1739	Zhang Yi	China	582	China	1729
Silver	Sylwia Bogacka	Poland	683.8	Germany	1738	Kristina Vestveit	Norway	582	Germany	1725
Bronze	Sonja Pfeilschifter	Germany	683.4	China	1734	Ratchadaporn Plangsangthong	Thailand	580	Serbia and Montenegro	1714
Women's 50 m Rifle Prone
Gold	Olga Dovgun	Kazakhstan	597	Germany	1766	Valentina Protasova	Russia	592	Russia	1764
Silver	Hanne Skarpodde	Norway	596	Kazakhstan	1761	Daria Vdovina	Russia	589	Israel	1752
Bronze	Varvara Kovalenko	Kazakhstan	594	Ukraine	1761	Danielle Roth	Israel	589	Norway	1750
Women's 10 m Air Rifle
Gold	Du Li	China	502.1	Germany	1192	Zhang Yi	China	399	China	1183
Silver	Kateřina Kůrková	Czech Republic	501.8	China	1190	Lee Sena	South Korea	397	South Korea	1179
Bronze	Olga Dovgun	Kazakhstan	500.9	Russia	1187	Yuriko Kaizuka	Japan	396	Germany	1178

== Pistol events ==
=== Men ===
Pos	Individual			Team		Junior			Junior Team	
Men's 50 m Pistol
Gold	Tan Zongliang	China	667.1	China	1685	Pu Qifeng	China	560	China	1641
Silver	Vigilio Fait	Italy	662.8	Russia	1668	Ventsislav Savov	Bulgaria	554	South Korea	1630
Bronze	Vladimir Isakov	Russia	662.7	Italy	1667	Lee Daemyung	South Korea	552	Germany	1629
Men's 25 m Rapid Fire Pistol
Gold	Zhang Penghui	China	786.6	China	1743	Christian Reitz	Germany	575	Russia	1711
Silver	Liu Zhongsheng	China	781.7	Russia	1736	Philipp Wagenitz	Germany	575	Germany	1708
Bronze	Sergei Alifirenko	Russia	778.9	Italy	1721	Dmitry Brayko	Russia	573	France	1676
Men's 25 m Center-Fire Pistol						25 m Pistol				
Gold	Liu Yadong	China	587	Russia	1746	Leonid Ekimov	Russia	580	Russia	1721
Silver	Mikhail Nestruev	Russia	585	South Korea	1741	Thibaut Sauvage	France	580	France	1715
Bronze	Michael Hofmann	Switzerland	585	North Korea	1740	Ivan Stoukachev	Russia	576	South Korea	1694
Men's 25 m Standard Pistol
Gold	Liu Guohoi	China	577	China	1715	Park Kyusang	South Korea	559	Russia	1651
Silver	Kim Jong Su	North Korea	575	Russia	1711	Leonid Ekimov	Russia	558	France	1645
Bronze	Jakkrit Panichpatikum	Thailand	575	Ukraine	1706	Thibaut Sauvage	France	557	Thailand	1588
Men's 10 m Air Pistol
Gold	Pang Wei	China	683.8	China	1747	Pu Qifeng	China	580	China	1726
Silver	Jakkrit Panichpatikum	Thailand	683.0	Russia	1745	Lee Daemyung	South Korea	578	Russia	1717
Bronze	Vladimir Gontcharov	Russia	681.1	France	1733	Mai Jiajie	China	578	India	1716

=== Women ===
Pos	Individual			Team		Junior			Junior Team	
Women's 25 m Pistol
Gold	Chen Ying	China	792.8	China	1740	Zorana Arunović	Serbia and Montenegro	577	China	1715
Silver	Fei Fengji	China	790.4	Belarus	1735	Yu Lu	China	576	Bulgaria	1710
Bronze	Otryadyn Gündegmaa	Mongolia	785.2	Germany	1730	Alena Suslonova	Russia	575	Russia	1708
Women's 10 m Air Pistol
Gold	Natalia Paderina	Russia	486.9	China	1154	Brankica Zaric	Serbia and Montenegro	384	China	1139
Silver	Hu Jun	China	485.2	Belarus	1140	Liu Weiwei	China	384	South Korea	1132
Bronze	Viktoria Chaika	Belarus	485.1	Russia	1138	Harveen Srao	India	382	Serbia and Montenegro	1130

== Shotgun events ==
=== Men ===
Pos	Individual			Team		Junior			Junior Team	
Men's Trap
Gold	Manavjit Singh Sandhu	India	143	Russia	362	Abdulrahm Alfaihan	Kuwait	117	Italy	344
Silver	Erminio Frasca	Italy	142	India	360	Carl Exton	United Kingdom	117	Spain	341
Bronze	Bret Erickson	United States	142	United States	359	Daniele Resca	Italy	116	Slovakia	339
Men's Double Trap
Gold	Vitaly Fokeev	Russia	190	United States	414	Mikhail Leybo	Russia	131	Russia	384
Silver	Hu Binyuan	China	189	China	414	Simone Camerini	Italy	129	Italy	382
Bronze	Roland Gerebics	Hungary	187	Russia	403	Ahmad Dhadi	United Arab Emirates	129	United States	365
Men's Skeet
Gold	Andrei Inešin	Estonia	148	Italy	365	Lawrence Collier	United Kingdom	121	United States	348
Silver	Valeri Shomin	Russia	147	Czech Republic	361	Wesley Wise	United States	120	Italy	346
Bronze	Tore Brovold	Norway	147	Norway	360	Jesse Louhelainen	Finland	119	France	344

=== Women ===
Pos	Individual			Team		Junior			Junior Team
Women's Trap
Gold	Susan Nattrass	Canada	90	China	201	Qin Wen	China	68	
Silver	Chen Li	China	89	United Kingdom	201	Marina Sauzet	France	67	
Bronze	Chae Hye Gyong	North Korea	88	Russia	196	Emma Eagles	Australia	64	
Women's Double Trap
Gold	Son Hye Kyoung	South Korea	106						
Silver	Li Yuxiang	China	104						
Bronze	Lee Bo Na	South Korea	103						
Women's Skeet
Gold	Erdzhanik Avetisyan	Russia	95	United States	211	Emily Blount	United States	71	
Silver	Chiara Cainero	Italy	94	Russia	209	Albina Shakirova	Russia	68	
Bronze	Danka Bartekova	Slovakia	94	Italy	209	Angelina Mishchuk	Russia	67	

== Running target events ==
=== Men ===
Pos	Individual			Team		Junior			Junior Team	
Men's 50 m Running Target
Gold	Lukasz Czapla	Poland	593	Czech Republic	1753	Tomas Caknakis	Czech Republic	590	Russia	1744
Silver	Miroslav Janus	Czech Republic	592	Sweden	1742	Dmitry Romanov	Russia	588	North Korea	1740
Bronze	Peter Pelach	Slovakia	587	Russia	1739	Norbert Kocsis	Hungary	587	Czech Republic	1717
Men's 50 m Running Target Mixed
Gold	Lukasz Czapla	Poland	395	Ukraine	1165	Jo Yong Chol	North Korea	392	North Korea	1156
Silver	Peter Pelach	Slovakia	393	Russia	1165	Tomas Caknakis	Czech Republic	390	Russia	1151
Bronze	Bedrich Jonas	Czech Republic	391	Sweden	1164	Dmitry Romanov	Russia	388	Poland	1150
Men's 10 m Running Target
Gold	Niu Zhiyuan	China	584	Russia	1722	Dmitry Romanov	Russia	573	Russia	1686
Silver	Aleksandr Blinov	Russia	581	China	1716	Pak Myong Won	North Korea	572	Czech Republic	1683
Bronze	Miroslav Janus	Czech Republic	581	Sweden	1715	Tomas Caknakis	Czech Republic	569	North Korea	1681
Men's 10 m Running Target Mixed
Gold	Lukasz Czapla	Poland	391	China	1158	Dmitry Romanov	Russia	386	Russia	1134
Silver	Gan Lin	China	387	Ukraine	1142	Roman Marchenko	Russia	383	North Korea	1114
Bronze	Niu Zhiyuan	China	387	Sweden	1136	Pak Myong Won	North Korea	381	Czech Republic	1111

=== Women ===
Pos	Individual			Team		Junior			Junior Team	
Women's 10 m Running Target
Gold	Audrey Corenflos	France	385	China	1135	Anne Weigel	Germany	382	Germany	1116
Silver	Sun Aiwen	China	382	Ukraine	1115	Bianka Keczeli	Hungary	376	Russia	1096
Bronze	Viktoriya Zabolotna	Ukraine	380	Russia	1108	Tetyana Yevseyenko	Ukraine	371	Ukraine	1060
Women's 10 m Running Target Mixed
Gold	Audrey Corenflos	France	385	Ukraine	1131	Bianka Keczeli	Hungary	371	Russia	1105
Silver	Galina Avramenko	Ukraine	383	China	1126	Oksana Danilenko	Russia	370	Germany	1074
Bronze	Sun Aiwen	China	381	Russia	1121	Olga Stepanova	Russia	370	Ukraine	1071

== See also ==
- Shooting at the 2008 Summer Olympics
