= Vladislav Shchepotkin =

Russian sport shooter

Personal information
- Nationality: Russian
- Born: 4 November 1996 (age 29)

Sport
- Country: Russia
- Sport: Shooting
- Event: Air pistol
Medal record
World Championships
| Gold medal – first place | 2018 Changwon | 10 m team running target |
European Championships
| Silver medal – second place | 2020 Wroclaw | 10 m running target mixed |
| Silver medal – second place | 2020 Wroclaw | 10 m team running target mixed |

Vladislav Shchepotkin (born 4 November 1996) is a Russian sport shooter.

He participated at the 2018 ISSF World Shooting Championships, winning a medal.
