= Dmitry Romanov =

Russian sport shooter

Personal information
- Full name: Dmitry Alekseyevich Romanov
- Nationality: Russian
- Born: 17 March 1987 (age 39)
- Height: 1.80 m (5 ft 11 in)
- Weight: 58 kg (128 lb)

Sport
- Country: Russia
- Sport: Shooting
- Event: Running target shooting
Medal record
World Championships
Gold medal – first place	2018 Changwon	50 m team running target
Silver medal – second place	2018 Changwon	50 m team running target mixed

Dmitry Alekseyevich Romanov (Russian: Дмитрий Алексеевич Романов; born 17 March 1987) is a Russian sport shooter.

He participated at the 2018 ISSF World Shooting Championships, winning a medal.
