= Łukasz Czapla =

Polish sport shooter (born 1982)

Personal information
- Nationality: Polish
- Born: 8 December 1982 (age 43) Kraków, Poland
- Height: 1.90 m (6 ft 3 in)
- Weight: 89 kg (196 lb)

Sport
- Country: Poland
- Sport: Shooting
- Event: Running target shooting
- Club: Army Club Wawel Krakow
Medal record
Men's Shooting
Representing Poland
World Championships
Gold medal – first place	2023 Baku	50 m running target open
Silver medal – second place	2018 Changwon	10 m running target mixed
Silver medal – second place	2018 Changwon	50 m running target
European Championships
Gold medal – first place	2026 Yerevan	10 m running target mixed
Silver medal – second place	2024 Plzeň	50 m running target mixed
Silver medal – second place	2026 Yerevan	10 m running target
Bronze medal – third place	2024 Plzeň	10 m running target
Bronze medal – third place	2025 Chateauroux	10 m Running Target

Łukasz Czapla (born 8 December 1982) is a Polish sport shooter, a four-time world champion and former holder of the world record in 10 metre running target mixed. He holds all four Polish running target records, three of them higher than the world records.

Czapla won 50 metre running target, 50 metre running target mixed and 10 metre running target mixed at the 2006 ISSF World Shooting Championships, and successfully defended the 10 metre mixed title at the 2008 World Running Target Championships.
