= Niklas Bergström =

Swedish sports shooter

Personal information
- Full name: Lars Niklas Bergström
- Nationality: Swedish
- Born: 18 August 1974 (age 51) Karlstad, Sweden
- Height: 1.90 m (6 ft 3 in)
- Weight: 83 kg (183 lb)

Sport
- Country: Sweden
- Sport: Shooting
- Event(s): 10 m running target (10RT); 50 m running target (50RT)
- Club: Glaskogens JSK
- Coached by: Claes Johansson
Medal record
Men's shooting
Representing Sweden
World Championships
Gold medal – first place	2018 Changwon	50 m team running target mixed
Gold medal – first place	2018 Changwon	10 m team running target mixed
Silver medal – second place	2018 Changwon	50 m team running target
Bronze medal – third place	2009 Vierumäki	50RTMIX
Bronze medal – third place	2018 Changwon	10 m team running target
European Championships
Gold medal – first place	2005 Tallinn	10RT
Gold medal – first place	2009 Prague	10RT
Silver medal – second place	2005 Belgrade	10RT
Silver medal – second place	2009 Osijek	50RT
Bronze medal – third place	2001 Zagreb	50RT

Lars Niklas Bergström (born 18 August 1974) is a Swedish sport shooter. He has been selected to compete for Sweden in running target shooting at the 2004 Summer Olympics, and has won a total of seventeen medals in a major international competition, spanning the ISSF World Cup series, the World Championships, and the European Championships. Bergstrom trains under head coach Claes Johansson for the national running target team, while shooting at Glaskogens JSK in Glava.

== Career ==
Bergström qualified for his first and only Swedish squad in the last Olympic running target competition at the 2004 Summer Olympics in Athens. He finished behind U.S. shooter and three-time Olympian Adam Saathoff in a runner-up position at the ISSF World Cup meet a year earlier in Suhl, Germany to secure an Olympic berth for Sweden, and eventually join with fellow marksman Emil Andersson for the national team. Bergstrom marked a steady 286 in the slow-target portion and 285 in the fast-moving round to accumulate a total score of 571 points in the qualifying round, shutting him out of the Olympic final to twelfth in a 19-shooter field.

At the 2009 World Running Target Championships in Vierumäki, Finland, Bergström held off a strenuous challenge from Russia's Igor Kolessov to capture his first ever Worlds medal in a bronze medal duel 20 to 19, finishing third at 391 points.
