= Emil Martinsson =

Swedish sport shooter (born 1979)

Personal information
- Full name: Per Johan Emil Andersson Martinsson
- Nationality: Swedish
- Born: Emil Andersson; 14 November 1979 (age 46) Göteryd, Sweden
- Height: 1.81 m (5 ft 11 in)
- Weight: 78 kg (172 lb)

Sport
- Country: Sweden
- Sport: Shooting
- Event: Running target shooting
- Club: Osby
Medal record
Individual
| Event | 1st | 2nd | 3rd |
|---|---|---|---|
| World Championships | 7 | 5 | 3 |
| European Championships | 9 | 10 | 12 |
| Total | 16 | 15 | 15 |
Team
| Event | 1st | 2nd | 3rd |
|---|---|---|---|
| World Championships | 3 | 1 | 3 |

Emil Martinsson, sometimes known as Emil Andersson (born 14 November 1979) is a Swedish running target sport shooter who won several medals at the ISSF World Shooting Championships.

He competed with his birth name Emil Andersson until 2009, when he married and chose to acquire the surname of his wife Martinsson, as permitted by Swedish law.

== Biography ==
Martinsson was fourth in the Running Target, 10 metres at Athens 2004.

He grew up close to the Småland-Skåne border, but now lives in Strömsund, Jämtland. His trainer is Claes Johansson. At the 2008 World Running Target Championships, Martinsson became the first ever 10 metre running target World Champion in a knockout format. He defeated top seed Vladyslav Prianishnikov in the semifinal (6–3) and then scored seven straight tens in the final, winning it with 6–1 over Miroslav Januš. Martinsson defeated his title at the 2009 World Running Target Championships, once again scoring straight tens in the final.

Prior to this, Martinsson had won two individual world championship medals: a silver in 50 metre running target mixed at the 2002 ISSF World Shooting Championships and a bronze in 10 metre running target mixed in 2008. He also participated in the last Olympic running target competition which was held in 2004, reaching the final and finishing fourth, missing the bronze medal by 0.3 points. At the 2006 ISSF World Shooting Championships he failed to win an individual medal, but was part of the Swedish team that won medals in all four team events (one silver and three bronze).

Martinsson holds several Swedish records; his 50 metre running target record is 598 points, two points higher than the world record.

== Individual and team medals at World Championships ==
Team event

| Year | Competition | Venue | Rank | Event | Points |
|---|---|---|---|---|---|
| 2002 | World Championships | (Finland) Lahti | 2nd | 50 m running target mixed | 394 |
| 2008 | World Championships | (Czech Republic) Plzeň | 1st | 10 m running target | 577 + 6 + 6 |
| 2008 | World Championships | (Czech Republic) Plzeň | 3rd | 10 m running target mixed | 382 |
| 2008 | World Championships | (Czech Republic) Plzeň | 3rd | 50 m running target mixed (team) | 1160 |
| 2009 | World Championships | (Finland) Heinola | 1st | 10 m running target | 578 + 6 + 6 |
| 2008 | World Championships | (Germany) Munich | 1st | 50 m running target | 590 |
| 2008 | World Championships | (Germany) Munich | 3rd | 50 m running target mixed | 391 |
| 2012 | World Championships | (Sweden) Stockholm | 2nd | 50 m running target | 590 + 19 |
| 2012 | World Championships | (Sweden) Stockholm | 2nd | 50 m running target mixed | 390 |
| 2014 | World Championships | (Spain) Granada | 1st | 10 m running target | 578 + 6 + 6 |
| 2014 | World Championships | (Spain) Granada | 1st | 50 m running target (team) | 1166 |
| 2014 | World Championships | (Spain) Granada | 2nd | 10 m running target mixed | 389 |
| 2014 | World Championships | (Spain) Granada | 2nd | 50 m running target mixed | 394 |
| 2014 | World Championships | (Spain) Granada | 3rd | 50 m running target mixed (team) | 1741 |
| 2016 | World Championships | (Germany) Suhl | 1st | 10 m running target mixed | 390 |
| 2016 | World Championships | (Germany) Suhl | 1st | 50 m running target mixed | 396 |
| 2016 | World Championships | (Germany) Suhl | 3rd | 50 m running target | 587 |
| 2018 | World Championships | (South Korea) Changwon | 1st | 50 m running target mixed | 393 |
| 2018 | World Championships | (South Korea) Changwon | 1st | 10 m running target mixed (team) | 1147 |
| 2018 | World Championships | (South Korea) Changwon | 1st | 50 m running target mixed (team) | 1171 |
| 2018 | World Championships | (South Korea) Changwon | 2nd | 50 m running target (team) | 1756 |
| 2018 | World Championships | (South Korea) Changwon | 3rd | 10 m running target (team) | 1718 |

== Individual medals at the European Championships ==
| Discipline | 1st place, gold medalist(s) | 2nd place, silver medalist(s) | 3rd place, bronze medalist(s) |
|---|---|---|---|
| 10 m running target | 3 | 2 | 4 |
| 10 m running target mixed | 2 | 1 | 4 |
| 50 m running target | 2 | 4 | 1 |
| 50 m running target mixed | 1 | 3 | 2 |
| | 8 | 10 | 11 |
