= Julia Eydenzon =

Russian sport shooter

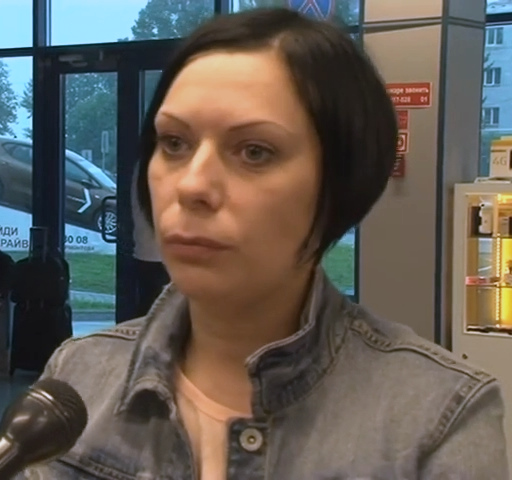
- Eydenzon in 2016

Personal information
- Nationality: Russian
- Born: 12 June 1982 (age 44) Omsk, Russia
- Height: 1.60 m (5 ft 3 in)
- Weight: 50 kg (110 lb)

Sport
- Country: Russia
- Sport: Shooting
- Event: Running target shooting
Medal record
World Championships
Bronze medal – third place	2018 Changwon	10 m team running target
Bronze medal – third place	2018 Changwon	10 m team running target mixed
European Championships
Gold medal – first place	2020 Wroclaw	10 m team running target mixed
Gold medal – first place	2020 Wroclaw	10 m mixed team running target mixed

Julia Eydenzon (born 12 June 1982) is a Russian sport shooter.

She participated at the 2018 ISSF World Shooting Championships, winning a medal.
