= Tomi-Pekka Heikkilä =

Finnish sport shooter

Personal information
- Nationality: Finnish
- Born: 12 April 1990 (age 36) Kangasala, Finland
- Height: 1.78 m (5 ft 10 in)
- Weight: 75 kg (165 lb)

Sport
- Country: Finland
- Sport: Shooting
- Event: Running target shooting
- Club: K-64
Medal record
World Championships
Gold medal – first place	2018 Changwon	10 m running target mixed
Bronze medal – third place	2018 Changwon	50 m running target

Tomi-Pekka Heikkilä (born 12 April 1990) is a Finnish sport shooter.

He participated at the 2018 ISSF World Shooting Championships, winning a medal.
