= Running target shooting =

Set of shooting sports involving moving targets

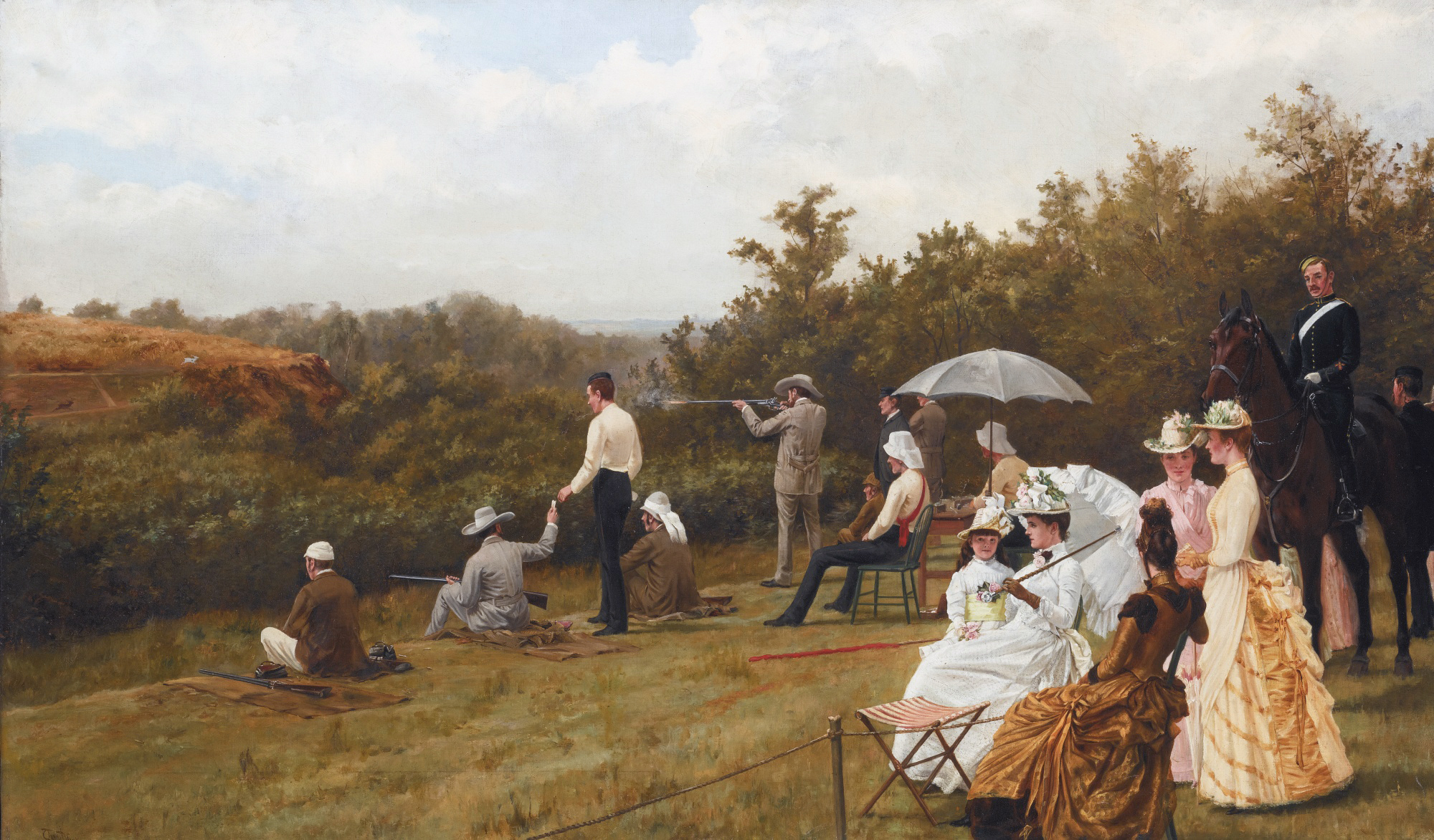
The American shooter Walter Winans during a 100 meter running deer competition in Wimbledon Common, London (painting by Thomas Blinks, 1888).

Running target shooting refers to a number of target shooting sports and events involving a shooting target—sometimes called a boar, moose, or deer—that is made to move as if it is a running animal. Competitions are shot at known target distances, and with known target velocity and for how long the target is visible. The target starts every other time from left or right.

== Events ==
- ISSF 10 meter running target and ISSF 10 meter running target mixed
- ISSF 50 meter running target and ISSF 50 meter running target mixed (also known as 50 meter running boar)
- 100 meter running deer, which previously was an ISSF event. Running deer competitions are currently only held in the Nordic Shooting Region.
- 100 meter running moose, a popular competition in Scandinavia oriented towards hunters. Usually fired at 100 meters, but sometimes at 80 meters instead.

In running deer the target is visible for 4.3 seconds, while in running moose it is visible for 4 to 5 seconds. 10 and 50 m running target competitions feature two different times of visibility, with slow at 5 seconds and fast at 2.5 seconds.

== World championships ==
The 1969 World Running Target Championships were separate ISSF World Shooting Championships for the 100 metre running deer event held in Sandviken, Sweden. The competition was also valid as a 1969 European Running Target Championships, in which the rankings of the races played with all world athletes were drawn up taking into account only European athletes.

== See also ==
- Shooting sports
