= Olga Stepanova =

Russian sport shooter

Personal information
- Nationality: Russian
- Born: 10 November 1986 (age 39)

Sport
- Country: Russia
- Sport: Shooting
- Event: Running target shooting
Medal record
World Championships
Gold medal – first place	2018 Changwon	10 m running target
Bronze medal – third place	2018 Changwon	10 m team running target
Bronze medal – third place	2018 Changwon	10 m team running target mixed
European Championships
Gold medal – first place	2020 Wroclaw	10 m running target
Gold medal – first place	2020 Wroclaw	10 m team running target mixed
Bronze medal – third place	2020 Wroclaw	10 m running target mixed

Olga Sergeyevna Stepanova (Russian: Ольга Сергеевна Степанова; born 10 November 1986) is a Russian sport shooter.

She participated at the 2018 ISSF World Shooting Championships, winning a medal.
