= Maxim Stepanov (sport shooter) =

Russian sport shooter

Personal information
- Full name: Maxim Sergeyevich Stepanov
- Nationality: Russian
- Born: 3 February 1980 (age 46) Leningrad, USSR, Soviet Union
- Height: 1.75 m (5 ft 9 in)
- Weight: 58 kg (128 lb)

Sport
- Country: Russia
- Sport: Shooting
- Event: Running target shooting
Medal record
World Championships
Gold medal – first place	2018 Changwon	10 m team running target
Gold medal – first place	2018 Changwon	50 m team running target
Silver medal – second place	2018 Changwon	10 m running target
Silver medal – second place	2018 Changwon	10 m team running target mixed
Silver medal – second place	2018 Changwon	50 m team running target mixed

Maxim Sergeyevich Stepanov (Russian: Максим Сергеевич Степанов; born 3 February 1980) is a Russian sport shooter.

He participated at the 2018 ISSF World Shooting Championships, winning a medal.
