= Krister Holmberg (sport shooter) =

Finnish sports shooter

Personal information
- Nationality: Finnish
- Born: 17 May 1972 (age 52); Ekenäs, Finland

Sport
- Sport: Sports shooting

Krister Holmberg (born 17 May 1972) is a Finnish sports shooter who competed in the men's 10 metre running target event at the 1996 Summer Olympics.
