= European 10 m Events Championships =

Shooting Tournament

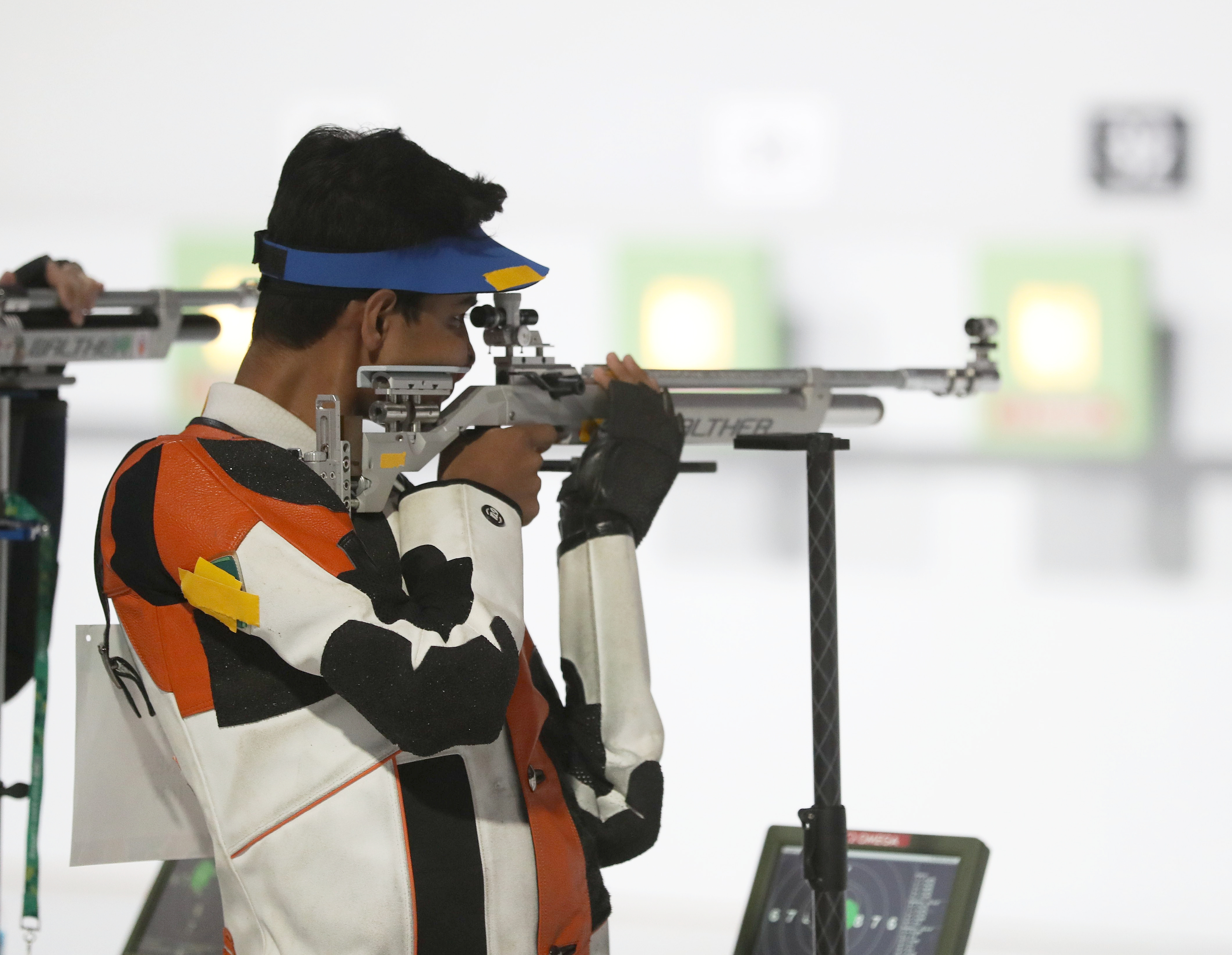
A shooter in competition 10 m air rifle.

The European 10m Championships are special shooting sport championships for ISSF 10metre air rifle and pistol disciplines. They have been organised by the European Shooting Confederation (ESC) since 1971.

== Disciplines ==
- 10 m air pistol
- 10 m air rifle

== Editions ==
#	Year	City	Date	Events
1	1971	Meziboří, Czechoslovakia	16–20 March	Air rifle, air pistol (2 men + 2 women)
2	1972	(Socialist Federal Republic of Yugoslavia) Belgrade, Yugoslavia	18–20 February	Air rifle, air pistol (2 men + 2 women)
3	1973	Linz, Austria	16–17 February	Air rifle, air pistol (2 men + 2 women)
4	1974	Enschede, Netherlands	23–24 February	Air rifle, air pistol (2 men + 2 women)
5	1975	London, United Kingdom	22–23 February	Air rifle, air pistol (2 men + 2 women)
6	1976	Paris, France	21–22 February	Air rifle, air pistol (2 men + 2 women)
7	1977	Andorra la Vella, Andorra	12–13 February	Air rifle, air pistol (2 men + 2 women)
8	1978	Copenhagen, Denmark	22–25 February	Air rifle, air pistol (2 men + 2 women)
9	1979	Graz, Austria	6–11 March	Air rifle, air pistol, running target (3 men + 2 women)
10	1980	Oslo, Norway	1–2 March	Air rifle, air pistol, running target (3 men + 2 women)
11	1981	Athens, Greece	26–27 February	Air rifle, air pistol, running target (3 men + 2 women)
12	1982	The Hague, Netherlands	18–19 March	Air rifle, air pistol, running target (3 men + 2 women)
13	1983	Dortmund, West Germany	17–19 March	Air rifle, air pistol, running target (3 men + 2 women)
14	1984	Budapest, Hungary	3–4 March	Air rifle, air pistol, running target (3 men + 2 women)
15	1985	Varna, Bulgaria	2–3 March	Air rifle, air pistol, running target (3 men + 2 women)
16	1986	Espoo, Finland	1–2 March	Air rifle, air pistol, running target (3 men + 2 women)
17	1987	Bratislava, Czechoslovakia	28 February – 1 March	Air rifle, air pistol, running target (3 men + 2 women)
18	1988	Stavanger, Norway	26–28 February	Air rifle, air pistol, running target (3 men + 2 women)
19	1989	Copenhagen, Denmark	3–5 March	Air rifle, air pistol, running target (3 men + 2 women)
20	1990	Arnhem, Netherlands		Air rifle, air pistol, running target (3 men + 2 women)
21	1991	Manchester, United Kingdom		Air rifle, air pistol, running target (3 men + 2 women)
22	1992	Budapest, Hungary		Air rifle, air pistol, running target (3 men + 2 women)
23	1994	Strasbourg, France	28 February – 6 March	Air rifle, air pistol, running target (3 men + 2 women)
24	1995	Vantaa, Finland		Air rifle, air pistol, running target (3 men + 2 women)
25	1996	Budapest, Hungary		Air rifle, air pistol, running target (3 men + 2 women)
26	1997	Warsaw, Poland	28 February – 1 March	Air rifle, air pistol, running target (3 men + 2 women)
27	1998	Tallinn, Estonia		Air rifle, air pistol, running target (3 men + 2 women)
28	1999	Arnhem, Netherlands		Air rifle, air pistol, running target (3 men + 2 women)
29	2000	Munich, Germany		Air rifle, air pistol, running target, running target mixed (4 men + 4 women)
30	2001	Pontevedra, Spain		Air rifle, air pistol, running target, running target mixed (4 men + 4 women)
31	2002	Thessaloniki, Greece	22–24 March	Air rifle, air pistol, running target, running target mixed (4 men + 4 women)
32	2003	Gothenburg, Sweden	3–9 November	Air rifle, air pistol, running target, running target mixed (4 men + 4 women)
33	2004	Győr, Hungary	22–28 March	Air rifle, air pistol, running target, running target mixed (4 men + 4 women)
34	2005	Tallinn, Estonia	28 February – 2 March	Air rifle, air pistol, running target, running target mixed (4 men + 4 women)
35	2006	Moscow, Russia	27 February – 2 March	Air rifle, air pistol, running target, running target mixed (4 men + 4 women)
36	2007	Deauville, France	12–18 March	Air rifle, air pistol, running target, running target mixed (4 men + 4 women)
37	2008	Winterthur, Switzerland	24 February – 2 March	Air rifle, air pistol, running target, running target mixed (4 men + 4 women)
38	2009	Prague, Czech Republic	19–23 February	Air rifle, air pistol, running target, running target mixed (4 men + 4 women)
39	2010	Meråker, Norway	7–14 March	Air rifle, air pistol, running target, running target mixed (4 men + 2 women)
40	2011	Brescia, Italy	3–6 March	Air rifle, air pistol, running target, running target mixed (4 men + 4 women)
41	2012	Vierumäki, Finland	16–19 February	Air rifle, air pistol, running target, running target mixed (4 men + 4 women)
42	2013	Odense, Denmark	25 February – 3 March	Air rifle, air pistol, running target, running target mixed (4 men + 4 women)
43	2014	Moscow, Russia	26 February – 3 March	Air rifle, air pistol, running target, running target mixed (4 men + 4 women)
44	2015	Arnhem, Netherlands	2–8 March	Air rifle, air pistol, running target, running target mixed (4 men + 4 women)
45	2016	Győr, Hungary	22–28 February	Air rifle, air pistol, running target, running target mixed (4 men + 4 women)
46	2017	Maribor, Slovenia	6–12 March	Air rifle, air pistol, running target, running target mixed (4 men + 4 women)
47	2018	Győr, Hungary	16–26 February	Air rifle, air pistol, running target, running target mixed (4 men + 4 women)
48	2019	Osijek, Croatia	16–25 March	Air rifle, air pistol, running target, running target mixed (4 men + 4 women)
49	2020	Wrocław, Poland	23 February – 1 March	Air rifle, air pistol, running target, running target mixed (4 men + 4 women + 2 mixed)
50	2021	Osijek, Croatia	23 May – 7 June	Air rifle, air pistol, running target, running target mixed (4 men + 4 women + 2 mixed)
51	2022	Hamar, Norway	18–27 March	Air rifle, air pistol, running target, running target mixed (4 men + 4 women + 2 mixed)
52	2023	Tallinn, Estonia	5–13 March	Air rifle, air pistol (4 men + 4 women + 2 mixed)
53	2024	Győr, Hungary	24 February – 3 March	Air rifle, air pistol (4 men + 4 women + 2 mixed)
54	2025	Osijek, Croatia	7–13 March	Air rifle, air pistol (4 men + 4 women + 2 mixed)
55	2026	Yerevan, Armenia	27 February – 5 March	Air rifle, air pistol, running target, running target mixed (4 men + 4 women + 3 mixed)

== See also ==
- European Shooting Confederation
- European Shooting Championships
- ISSF shooting events
- International Shooting Sport Federation
