= European Shooting Championships =

European championship in sport shooting

- Status: Active
- Genre: Sporting event
- Date: Mid-year
- Frequency: Biennial
- Country: Varying
- Inaugurated: 1955

The European Shooting Championships are the continental championships for ISSF sport shooting disciplines in Europe, including 10m air rifle and air pistol, cartridge rifle (50m and 300m) and pistol (25m and 50m). Sometimes the competition also includes trap shooting, skeet and running target shooting events, usually organized in special championships.

The championships are organised by the European Shooting Confederation (ESC) with the support of the International Shooting Sport Federation (ISSF).

The first edition of the championships took place in 1955 in Bucharest. It takes place biennially, but every year 2-4 special championships held for European countries in separate shooting disciplines.

In reaction to the 2022 Russian invasion of Ukraine, the European Shooting Confederation stripped Russia of its right to host the 2022 European Shooting Championships in the 25m, 50m, 300m, running target and shotgun.

== Summary of Championships ==
Shooting championships
10 m events championships
300 m rifle championships
Running target championships
Shotgun championships

=== 1955–1990 ===
Championships	55	56	57	58	59	60	61	62	63	64	65	66	67	68	69	70	71	72	73	74	75	76	77	78	79	80	81	82	83	84	85	86	87	88	89	90
Shooting	•		•		•		•		•		•		•		•		•		•		•		•		•	•	•		•		•		•		•	
10 Events																	•	•	•	•	•	•	•	•	•	•	•	•	•	•	•	•	•	•	•	•
300 m Rifle					•																		•				•		•		•				•	
Running Target									•						•				•					•			•									
Shotgun		•	•	•	•	•		•	•	•	•	•	•	•	•	•		•	•	•	•	•	•	•	•	•	•	•		•	•	•		•		•

=== 1990–2020 ===
Championships	91	92	93	94	95	96	97	98	99	00	01	02	03	04	05	06	07	08	09	10	11	12	13	14	15	16	17	18	19	20
Shooting	•		•		•		•		•		•		•		•		•		•		•		•		•		•		•	
10 Events	•	•		•	•	•	•	•	•	•	•	•	•	•	•	•	•	•	•	•	•	•	•	•	•	•	•	•	•	•
300 m Rifle	•		•		•		•		•																					
Running Target					•		•																•							
Shotgun		•		•	•	•	•	•	•	•		•	•	•		•		•		•		•	•	•		•		•	•	

== Global Shooting Championships ==
#	Year	Venue	Disciplines	Individual events	Team events	Date
1	1955	(Romania) Bucharest	Rifle, Pistol, Trap, Skeet, Running deer	21 (17 men + 5 women)	15 (11 men + 4 women)	11 - 18 September
2	1957	(Socialist Federal Republic of Yugoslavia) Belgrade	Rifle	4 (2 men + 2 women)	4 (2 men + 2 women)	8 - 10 October
3	1959	(Italy) Brescia / Milan	Rifle, Pistol, Running target	14 (12 men + 2 women)		30 August - 6 September
4	1961	(Hungary) Budapest	Rifle, Pistol	5 (3 men + 2 women)		18 - 24 September
5	1963	(Norway) Oslo (Sweden) Stockholm	Rifle, Pistol	13 (men)		12 August and 18–24 August
6	1965	(Romania) Bucharest (Egypt) Cairo	Rifle, Pistol, Skeet, Running deer	20 (18 men + 2 women)		19 September and 23–30 September
7	1969	(Czechoslovakia) Plzeň	Rifle, Pistol	16 (men)		16 - 24 August
8	1971	(East Germany) Suhl	Rifle, Pistol, Trap, Skeet, Running target	14 (9 men + 5 women)		20 - 29 August
9	1975	(Romania) Bucharest (Spain) Madrid	Rifle, Pistol	8 (men)		19 - 22 June and 26–30 September
10	1977	(Romania) Bucharest	Rifle, Pistol	8 (men)		30 August - 4 September
11	1979	(Soviet Union) Lviv (West Germany) Frankfurt	Rifle, Pistol, Running target	9 (6 men + 3 women)		3 - 12 September and 27–30 September
12	1980	(Spain) Madrid	Rifle, Pistol	3 (women)		24 - 27 September
13	1981	(Socialist Federal Republic of Yugoslavia) Titograd	Rifle, Pistol	11 (8 men + 3 women)		14 - 22 September
14	1983	(Romania) Bucharest	Rifle, Pistol, Shotgun, Running target	13 (8 men + 5 women)		
15	1985	(Socialist Federal Republic of Yugoslavia) Osijek	Rifle, Pistol	14 (11 men + 3 women)		
16	1987	(Finland) Lahti	Rifle, Pistol, RT, 300 m rifle, Trap (women), Skeet (men)	14 (15 men + 4 women)		
17	1989	(Socialist Federal Republic of Yugoslavia) Zagreb	Rifle, Pistol, Running target, Trap, Skeet (men)	19 (15 men + 4 women)		
18	1991	(Italy) Bologna				
19	1993	(Czech Republic) Brno				
20	1995	(Switzerland) Zürich				
21	1997	(Finland) Kouvola				
22	1999	(France) Bordeaux				
23	2001	(Croatia) Zagreb				
24	2003	(Czech Republic) Plzeň				
25	2005	(Serbia) Belgrade				
26	2007	(Spain) Granada				
27	2009	(Croatia) Osijek	Rifle, Pistol, 300 m rifle, Shotgun, Running target	21 (14 men + 7 women)	20 (14 men + 6 women)	12–26 July
28	2011	(Serbia) Belgrade	Rifle, Pistol, 300 m rifle, Shotgun, Running target	21 (14 men + 7 women)	21 (14 men + 7 women)	31 July – 14 August
29	2013	(Croatia) Osijek	Rifle, Pistol, 300 m rifle	14 (9 men + 5 women)	14 (9 men + 5 women)	21 July – 4 August
30	2015	(Slovenia) Maribor	Rifle, Pistol, 300 m rifle, Shotgun, Running target	21 (14 men + 7 women)	21 (14 men + 7 women)	19–31 July
31	2017	(Azerbaijan) Baku	Rifle, Pistol, 300 m rifle, Shotgun, Running target	22 (14 men + 8 women)	25 (14 m + 8 w + 3 mixed)	21 July – 4 August
32	2019	(Italy) Bologna / Tolmezzo	Rifle, Pistol, 300 m rifle, Shotgun	13 (10 men + 5 women)	18 (10 m + 5 w + 3 mixed)	12–27 September
33	2021	(Croatia) Osijek	Rifle, Pistol, 300 m rifle, Shotgun	13 (10 men + 5 women)	18 (10 m + 5 w + 3 mixed)	22 May – 5 June
34	2024	(Croatia) Osijek	Rifle, Pistol, 300 m rifle	14 (9 men + 5 women)	14 (9 men + 5 women)	22 May – 7 June
35	2025	(France) Châteauroux	Rifle, Pistol, 300 m rifle, Shotgun, Running target	13 (10 men + 5 women)	18 (10 m + 5 w + 3 mixed)	25 July – 6 August
36	2026	(Croatia) Osijek	Rifle, Pistol			8–17 May

The European Championship Shotgun will take place in Larnaca, Cyprus, on August 24 — September 12, 2022.

The European Championship 25m/50m will take place in Wroclaw, Poland, on September 5-18, 2022.The competitions will include events for Men and Women as well as Men Junior and Women Junior.

== Special Shotgun Championships ==
European Shotgun Championships were first held in 1956. The 2020 edition was deleted for COVID-19.

Cancelled for COVID-19

#	Year	Venue	Disciplines	Individual events	Team events	Date
1	1956	(Spain) San Sebastián	Trap, Skeet	2 (men)	2 (men)	
2	1957	(France) Paris	Trap, Skeet	4 (2 men + 2 women)	2 (men)	
3	1958	(Switzerland) Geneva	Trap, Skeet	4 (2 men + 2 women)	2 (men)	
4	1959	(Italy) Turin	Trap, Skeet	4 (2 men + 2 women)	2 (men)	5 - 6 September
5	1960	(Spain) Barcelona (France) Paris	Trap, Skeet	4 (2 men + 2 women)	2 (men)	
6	1961	(Switzerland) Bern	Trap, Skeet	4 (2 men + 2 women)	2 (men)	
7	1962	(Lebanon) Beirut	Trap, Skeet	4 (2 men + 2 women)	2 (men)	
8	1963	(Czechoslovakia) Brno	Trap, Skeet	4 (2 men + 2 women)	2 (men)	
9	1964	(Italy) Bologna	Trap, Skeet	4 (2 men + 2 women)	2 (men)	
10	1965	(Portugal) Lisbon	Trap, Skeet	4 (2 men + 2 women)	2 (men)	
11	1966	(Finland) Lahti	Trap, Skeet	4 (2 men + 2 women)	2 (men)	
12	1967	(Czechoslovakia) Brno	Trap, Skeet	4 (2 men + 2 women)	2 (men)	
13	1968	(Belgium) Namur	Trap, Skeet	4 (2 men + 2 women)	2 (men)	
14	1969	(France) Paris	Trap, Skeet	4 (2 men + 2 women)	2 (men)	
15	1970	(Romania) Bucharest	Trap, Skeet	4 (2 men + 2 women)	2 (men)	
16	1972	(Spain) Madrid	Trap, Skeet	4 (2 men + 2 women)	2 (men)	5 - 15 May
17	1973	(Italy) Turin	Trap, Skeet	4 (2 men + 2 women)	4 (2 men + 2 women)	23 - 30 September
18	1974	(France) Antibes	Trap, Skeet	4 (2 men + 2 women)	4 (2 men + 2 women)	21 - 30 June
19	1975	(Austria) Vienna	Trap, Skeet	4 (2 men + 2 women)	4 (2 men + 2 women)	21 July - 3 August
20	1976	(Czechoslovakia) Brno	Trap, Skeet	4 (2 men + 2 women)	4 (2 men + 2 women)	23 - 30 May
21	1977	(United Kingdom) Dorset	Trap, Skeet	4 (2 men + 2 women)	4 (2 men + 2 women)	13 - 25 June
22	1978	(West Germany) Suhl	Trap, Skeet, Running target	5 (3 men + 2 women)	5 (3 men + 2 women)	12 - 23 July
23	1979	(Italy) Montecatini Terme	Trap, Skeet	4 (2 men + 2 women)	4 (2 men + 2 women)	
24	1980	(Spain) Zaragoza	Trap, Skeet	4 (2 men + 2 women)	4 (2 men + 2 women)	
25	1981	(Soviet Union) Moscow	Trap, Skeet	4 (2 men + 2 women)	4 (2 men + 2 women)	
26	1982	(Italy) Montecatini Terme	Trap, Skeet	4 (2 men + 2 women)	4 (2 men + 2 women)	
27	1984	(Spain) Zaragoza	Trap, Skeet	4 (2 men + 2 women)	4 (2 men + 2 women)	
28	1985	(France) Antibes	Trap, Skeet	4 (2 men + 2 women)	4 (2 men + 2 women)	
29	1986	(Italy) Montecatini Terme	Trap, Skeet	4 (2 men + 2 women)	4 (2 men + 2 women)	
30	1988	(Turkey) Istanbul	Trap, Skeet	4 (2 men + 2 women)	4 (2 men + 2 women)	
31	1990	(Sweden) Uddevalla	Trap, Skeet	4 (2 men + 2 women)	4 (2 men + 2 women)	
32	1992	(Turkey) Istanbul	Trap, Skeet	6 (3 men + 3 women)	6 (3 men + 3 women)	
33	1994	(Portugal) Lisbon	Trap, Skeet	6 (3 men + 3 women)	6 (3 men + 3 women)	
34	1995	(Finland) Lahti	Trap, Skeet, Running target	8 (5 men + 3 women)	8 (5 men + 3 women)	
35	1996	(Estonia) Tallinn	Trap, Skeet	6 (3 men + 3 women)	6 (3 men + 3 women)	
36	1997	(Finland) Sipoo	Trap, Skeet, Running target	8 (5 men + 3 women)	8 (5 men + 3 women)	
37	1998	(Cyprus) Nicosia	Trap, Skeet	6 (3 men + 3 women)	6 (3 men + 3 women)	
38	1999	(France) Poussan	Trap, Skeet	6 (3 men + 3 women)	6 (3 men + 3 women)	
39	2000	(Italy) Montecatini Terme	Trap, Skeet	6 (3 men + 3 women)	6 (3 men + 3 women)	
40	2002	(Italy) Lonato del Garda	Trap, Skeet	6 (3 men + 3 women)	6 (3 men + 3 women)	
41	2003	(Czech Republic) Brno	Trap, Skeet	6 (3 men + 3 women)	6 (3 men + 3 women)	
42	2004	(Cyprus) Nicosia	Trap, Skeet	6 (3 men + 3 women)	6 (3 men + 3 women)	
43	2006	(Slovenia) Maribor	Trap, Skeet	6 (3 men + 3 women)	6 (3 men + 3 women)	
44	2008	(Cyprus) Nicosia	Trap, Skeet	6 (3 men + 3 women)	6 (3 men + 3 women)	
45	2010	(Russia) Kazan	Trap, Skeet	5 (3 men + 2 women)	5 (3 men + 2 women)	
46	2012	(Cyprus) Larnaca	Trap, Skeet	5 (3 men + 2 women)	5 (3 men + 2 women)	19–25 May
47	2013	(Germany) Suhl	Trap, Skeet, Running target	7 (5 men + 2 women)	7 (5 men + 2 women)	28 July - 8 August
48	2014	(Hungary) Sarlóspuszta	Trap, Skeet	5 (3 men + 2 women)	5 (3 men + 2 women)	16–27 June
49	2016	(Italy) Lonato del Garda	Trap, Skeet	5 (3 men + 2 women)	5 (3 men + 2 women)	4–12 July
50	2018	(Austria) Leobersdorf	Trap, Skeet	6 (3 men + 3 women)	8 (3 men + 2 women + 3 mixed)	30 July - 13 August
51	2019	(Italy) Lonato del Garda	Trap, Skeet	4 (2 men + 2 women)	6 (3 men + 2 women + 2 mixed)	3–17 September
52	2022	(Cyprus) Larnaca	Trap, Skeet	5 (2 men + 2 women + 1 open)	6 (2 men + 2 women + 2 mixed)	26 August - 11 September
53	2023	(Croatia) Osijek	Trap, Skeet	5 (2 men + 2 women + 1 open)	6 (2 men + 2 women + 2 mixed)	10–26 September
54	2024	(Italy) Lonato del Garda	Trap, Skeet	5 (2 men + 2 women + 1 open)	6 (2 men + 2 women + 2 mixed)	17–26 May
55	2026	(Greece) Athens	Trap, Skeet	5 (2 men + 2 women + 1 open)	6 (2 men + 2 women + 2 mixed)	27-13 October

== Special 10 m Events Championships ==
#	Year	Venue	Disciplines	Individual events	Team events	Date
1	1971	(Czechoslovakia) Meziboří	Air rifle, air pistol	2 men + 2 women	2 men + 2 women	16 - 20 March
2	1972	(Socialist Federal Republic of Yugoslavia) Belgrade	Air rifle, air pistol	2 men + 2 women		
3	1973	(Austria) Linz	Air rifle, air pistol	2 men + 2 women		
4	1974	(Netherlands) Enschede	Air rifle, air pistol	2 men + 2 women		
5	1975	(United Kingdom) London	Air rifle, air pistol	2 men + 2 women		
6	1976	(France) Paris	Air rifle, air pistol	2 men + 2 women		
7	1977	Andorra La Vella	Air rifle, air pistol	2 men + 2 women		
8	1978	(Denmark) Copenhagen	Air rifle, air pistol	2 men + 2 women		
9	1979	(Austria) Graz	Air rifle, air pistol, running target	3 men + 2 women		
10	1980	(Norway) Oslo	Air rifle, air pistol, running target	3 men + 2 women		
11	1981	(Greece) Athens	Air rifle, air pistol, running target	3 men + 2 women		
12	1982	(Netherlands) The Hague	Air rifle, air pistol, running target	3 men + 2 women		
13	1983	(West Germany) Dortmund	Air rifle, air pistol, running target	3 men + 2 women		
14	1984	(Hungary) Budapest	Air rifle, air pistol, running target	3 men + 2 women		
15	1985	(Bulgaria) Varna	Air rifle, air pistol, running target	3 men + 2 women		
16	1986	(Finland) Espoo	Air rifle, air pistol, running target	3 men + 2 women		
17	1987	(Czechoslovakia) Bratislava	Air rifle, air pistol, running target	3 men + 2 women		
18	1988	(Norway) Stavanger	Air rifle, air pistol, running target	3 men + 2 women		
19	1989	(Denmark) Copenhagen	Air rifle, air pistol, running target	3 men + 2 women		
20	1990	(Netherlands) Arnhem	Air rifle, air pistol, running target	3 men + 2 women		
21	1991	(United Kingdom) Manchester	Air rifle, air pistol, running target	3 men + 2 women		
22	1992	(Hungary) Budapest	Air rifle, air pistol, running target	3 men + 2 women		
23	1994	(France) Strasbourg	Air rifle, air pistol, running target	3 men + 2 women		28 February - 6 March
24	1995	(Finland) Vantaa	Air rifle, air pistol, running target	3 men + 2 women		
25	1996	(Hungary) Budapest	Air rifle, air pistol, running target	3 men + 2 women		
26	1997	(Poland) Warsaw	Air rifle, air pistol, running target	3 men + 2 women		28 February - 1 March
27	1998	(Estonia) Tallinn	Air rifle, air pistol, running target	3 men + 2 women		
28	1999	(Netherlands) Arnhem	Air rifle, air pistol, running target	3 men + 2 women		
29	2000	(Germany) Munich	Air rifle, air pistol, running target, running target mixed	4 men + 4 women		
30	2001	(Spain) Pontevedra	Air rifle, air pistol, running target, running target mixed	4 men + 4 women		
31	2002	(Greece) Thessaloniki	Air rifle, air pistol, running target, running target mixed	4 men + 4 women		22–24 March
32	2003	(Sweden) Gothenburg	Air rifle, air pistol, running target, running target mixed	4 men + 4 women		3–9 November
33	2004	(Hungary) Győr	Air rifle, air pistol, running target, running target mixed	4 men + 4 women		22–28 March
34	2005	(Estonia) Tallinn	Air rifle, air pistol, running target, running target mixed	4 men + 4 women		28 February – 2 March
35	2006	(Russia) Moscow	Air rifle, air pistol, running target, running target mixed	4 men + 4 women		27 February – 2 March
36	2007	(France) Deauville	Air rifle, air pistol, running target, running target mixed	4 men + 4 women		12–18 March
37	2008	(Switzerland) Winterthur	Air rifle, air pistol, running target, running target mixed	4 men + 4 women		24 February – 2 March
38	2009	(Czech Republic) Prague	Air rifle, air pistol, running target, running target mixed	4 men + 4 women		19–23 February
39	2010	(Norway) Meråker	Air rifle, air pistol, running target, running target mixed	4 men + 2 women		7–14 March
40	2011	(Italy) Brescia	Air rifle, air pistol, running target, running target mixed	4 men + 4 women		3–6 March
41	2012	(Finland) Vierumäki	Air rifle, air pistol, running target, running target mixed	4 men + 4 women		16–19 February
42	2013	(Denmark) Odense	Air rifle, air pistol, running target, running target mixed	4 men + 4 women		25 February – 3 March
43	2014	(Russia) Moscow	Air rifle, air pistol, running target, running target mixed	4 men + 4 women		26 February – 3 March
44	2015	(Netherlands) Arnhem	Air rifle, air pistol, running target, running target mixed	4 men + 4 women		2–8 March
45	2016	(Hungary) Győr	Air rifle, air pistol, running target, running target mixed	4 men + 4 women		22–28 February
46	2017	(Slovenia) Maribor	Air rifle, air pistol, running target, running target mixed	4 men + 4 women		6–12 March
47	2018	(Hungary) Győr	Air rifle, air pistol, running target, running target mixed	4 men + 4 women		16–26 February
48	2019	(Croatia) Osijek	Air rifle, air pistol, running target, running target mixed	4 men + 4 women		16–25 March
49	2020	(Poland) Wrocław	Air rifle, air pistol, running target, running target mixed	4 men + 4 women + 2 mixed		23 February – 1 March
50	2021	(Croatia) Osijek	Air rifle, air pistol, running target, running target mixed	4 men + 4 women + 2 mixed		23 May – 7 June
51	2022	(Norway) Hamar	Air rifle, air pistol, running target, running target mixed	4 men + 4 women + 2 mixed		20–27 March
52	2023	(Estonia) Tallinn	Air rifle, air pistol, running target, running target mixed	4 men + 4 women + 2 mixed		7–12 March
53	2024	(Hungary) Győr	Air rifle, air pistol	2 men + 2 women + 2 mixed		26 February – 2 March
54	2025	(Croatia) Osijek	Air rifle, air pistol	2 men + 2 women + 2 mixed		9–12 March
55	2026	(Armenia) Yerevan	Air rifle, air pistol, running target, running target mixed	4 men + 4 women + 3 mixed	4 men + 4 women + 3 mixed	27 February – 5 March

== Special 300 m Rifle Championships ==
#	Year	Venue	Disciplines	Individual events	Team events	Date
1	1959	(Switzerland) Winterthur	300 m rifle	5 (men)	1 (men)	25 - 26 August
2	1977	(Switzerland) Winterthur	300 m rifle	5 (men)	5 (men)	9 - 11 September
3	1981	(Finland) Oulu	300 m rifle	5 (men)	5 (men)	15 - 20 June
4	1983	(Norway) Oslo	300 m rifle	5 (men)	5 (men)	15 - 19 June
5	1985	(Switzerland) Zürich	300 m rifle	5 (men)	5 (men)	6 - 10 September
6	1989	(Finland) Lahti	300 m rifle	5 (men)	5 (men)	29 July - 2 August
7	1991	(Switzerland) Winterthur	300 m rifle	5 (men)	5 (men)	
8	1993	(Switzerland) Thun	300 m rifle	3 (men)	3 (men)	
9	1995	(Sweden) Boden	300 m rifle	3 (men)	3 (men)	
10	1997	(Denmark) Copenhagen	300 m rifle	3 (men)	3 (men)	
11	1999	(France) Saint-Jean-de-Marsacq	300 m rifle	3 (men)	3 (men)	

== Special Running Target Championships ==
#	Year	Venue	Disciplines	Individual events	Team events	Date
1	1963	(Sweden) Sandviken	Running target, Running deer	3 (men)	3 (men)	
2	1969	(Sweden) Sandviken	Running target	1 (men)	1 (men)	
3	1973	(West Germany) Munich	Running target	1 (men)	1 (men)	
4	1981	(Hungary) Miskolc	Running target	1 (men)	1 (men)	
5	1995	(Finland) Lahti	Running target	1 (men)	1 (men)	
6	1997	(Finland) Sipoo	Running target	1 (men)	1 (men)	
7	2013	(Germany) Suhl	Running target	1 (men)	1 (men)	
8	2019	(Hungary) Gyenesdiás	Running target, running target mixed	2 men + 2 women	2 men + 2 women	8 - 15 July
9	2021	(France) Déols	Running target, running target mixed	2 men + 2 women	2 men + 2 women	28 Sep. - 6 Oct.
10	2024	(Czech Republic) Plzeň	Running target, running target mixed	2 men + 2 women	2 men + 2 women	28 Aug. - 3 Sep.

== Unofficial Championships ==
From 1929 to 1954 the European Championships was disputed only in clay pigeon shooting.

Year	Venue	Host country
1929	Stockholm	Sweden
1930	Rome	Italy
1931	Lvov	Poland
1933	Vienna	Austria
1934	Budapest	Hungary
1935	Brussels	Belgium
1936	Berlin	Germany
1937	Helsinki	Finland
1938	Luhačovice	Czechoslovakia
1939	Berlin	Germany
1940	Rome	Italy
1949	Bordighera	Italy
1950	Vichy	France
1952	Rome	Italy
1953	Barcelona	Spain
1954	Paris	France

== See also ==
- List of medalists at the European Shooting Championship
- European Junior Shooting Championships
- World Shooting Championships
