= Damir Mikec =

Serbian sport shooter (born 1984)

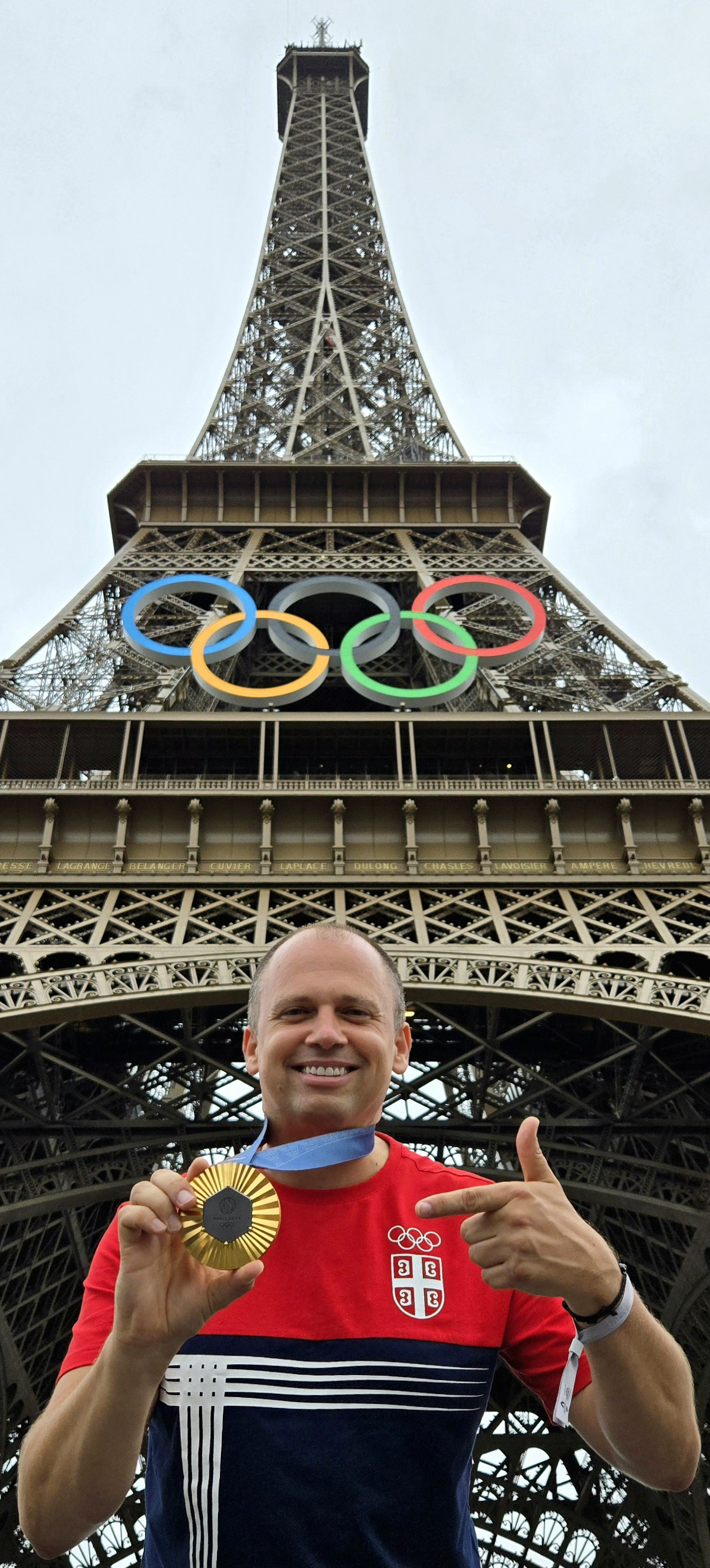
- Mikec with Olympic Gold at the Eiffel Tower

Personal information
- Nationality: Serbian
- Born: 31 March 1984 (age 42) Split, SFR Yugoslavia
- Height: 1.79 m (5 ft 10 in)
- Weight: 84 kg (185 lb)

Sport
- Country: Serbia and Montenegro and Serbia
- Sport: Shooting
- Event: 10m Air Pistol, 10m Air Pistol Mix, 50m Free Pistol
- Club: KSS "Policajac", Belgrade
Medal record
Men's shooting
Representing Serbia
Event	1st	2nd	3rd
Olympic Games	1	1	-
World Championships	1	4	-
World Cup Final	3	-	1
World Cup	11	11	3
European Games	2	1	-
European Championships	6	13	12
Mediterranean Games	3	1	3
ISSF Grand Prix	3	2	-
Universiade	-	1	-
Total	30	34	19
Olympic Games
Gold medal – first place	2024 Paris	10m Air Pistol Mix
Silver medal – second place	2020 Tokyo	10m Air Pistol
World Championships
Gold medal – first place	2022 Cairo	50m Pistol
Silver medal – second place	2023 Baku	10m Air Pistol
Silver medal – second place	2018 Changwon	50m Pistol
Silver medal – second place	2018 Changwon	50m Pistol Team
Silver medal – second place	2010 Munich	10m Air Pistol Team
World Cup Final
Gold medal – first place	2022 Cairo	10m Air Pistol
Gold medal – first place	2017 New Delhi	50m Pistol
Gold medal – first place	2016 Bologna	10m Air Pistol
Bronze medal – third place	2021 Wrocław	10m Air Pistol Mix
World Cup
Gold medal – first place	2023 Rio de Janeiro	10m Air Pistol Mix
Gold medal – first place	2023 Lima	10m Air Pistol Mix
Gold medal – first place	2023 Lima	10m Air Pistol
Gold medal – first place	2022 Changwon	10m Air Pistol Mix
Gold medal – first place	2022 Changwon	10m Air Pistol
Gold medal – first place	2022 Baku	10m Air Pistol
Gold medal – first place	2022 Cairo	10m Air Pistol Mix
Gold medal – first place	2015 Fort Benning	50m Pistol
Gold medal – first place	2014 Maribor	50m Pistol
Gold medal – first place	2012 Milan	50m Pistol
Gold medal – first place	2010 Fort Benning	10m Air Pistol
Silver medal – second place	2023 Baku	10m Air Pistol Mix
Silver medal – second place	2023 Cairo	10m Air Pistol Mix
Silver medal – second place	2021 Osijek	10m Air Pistol
Silver medal – second place	2021 Osijek	10m Air Pistol Team
Silver medal – second place	2019 New Delhi	10m Air Pistol
Silver medal – second place	2018 Munich	10m Air Pistol Mix
Silver medal – second place	2018 Fort Benning	10m Air Pistol Mix
Silver medal – second place	2016 Rio de Janeiro	10m Air Pistol
Silver medal – second place	2012 Munich	50m Pistol
Silver medal – second place	2010 Beijing	10m Air Pistol
Silver medal – second place	2009 Munich	50m Pistol
Bronze medal – third place	2022 Baku	10m Air Pistol Mix
Bronze medal – third place	2018 Changwon	10m Air Pistol Mix
Bronze medal – third place	2017 Gabala	50m Pistol
European Games
Gold medal – first place	2015 Baku	10m Air Pistol
Gold medal – first place	2015 Baku	50m Pistol
Silver medal – second place	2019 Minsk	10m Air Pistol Mix
European Championships
Gold medal – first place	2023 Tallinn	10m Air Pistol Mix
Gold medal – first place	2023 Tallinn	10m Air Pistol
Gold medal – first place	2017 Baku	50m Pistol Team
Gold medal – first place	2017 Maribor	10m Air Pistol Mix
Gold medal – first place	2016 Győr	10m Air Pistol Mix
Gold medal – first place	2003 Győr	10m Air Pistol Junior Team
Silver medal – second place	2021 Osijek	50m Pistol
Silver medal – second place	2021 Osijek	10m Air Pistol Mix
Silver medal – second place	2020 Wrocław	10m Air Pistol Mix
Silver medal – second place	2019 Osijek	10m Air Pistol
Silver medal – second place	2018 Győr	10m Air Pistol Mix
Silver medal – second place	2018 Győr	10m Air Pistol Team
Silver medal – second place	2017 Baku	50m Pistol
Silver medal – second place	2017 Maribor	10m Air Pistol
Silver medal – second place	2015 Arnhem	10m Air Pistol
Silver medal – second place	2013 Odense	10m Air Pistol Team
Silver medal – second place	2009 Prague	10m Air Pistol Team
Silver medal – second place	2004 Munich	50m Pistol Junior
Silver medal – second place	2004 Munich	50m Pistol Junior Team
Bronze medal – third place	2026 Yerevan	10m Air Pistol Team
Bronze medal – third place	2025 Osijek	10m Air Pistol Mix
Bronze medal – third place	2023 Tallinn	10m Air Pistol Team
Bronze medal – third place	2022 Wrocław	50m Pistol
Bronze medal – third place	2022 Hamar	10m Air Pistol Mix
Bronze medal – third place	2020 Wrocław	10m Air Pistol Team
Bronze medal – third place	2019 Osijek	10m Air Pistol Mix
Bronze medal – third place	2017 Maribor	10m Air Pistol Team
Bronze medal – third place	2016 Győr	10m Air Pistol Team
Bronze medal – third place	2015 Arnhem	10m Air Pistol Team
Bronze medal – third place	2011 Brescia	10m Air Pistol Team
Bronze medal – third place	2005 Belgrade	50m Pistol Team
Mediterranean Games
Gold medal – first place	2022 Oran	10m Air Pistol
Gold medal – first place	2022 Oran	10m Air Pistol Mix
Gold medal – first place	2018 Tarragona	10m Air Pistol
Silver medal – second place	2009 Pescara	50m Pistol
Bronze medal – third place	2026 Taranto	10m Air Pistol Mix
Bronze medal – third place	2013 Mersin	10m Air Pistol
Bronze medal – third place	2005 Almería	10m Air Pistol
ISSF Grand Prix
Gold medal – first place	2025 Ruse	10m Air Pistol
Gold medal – first place	2022 Granada	10m Air Pistol Mix
Gold medal – first place	2022 Osijek	10m Air Pistol Team
Silver medal – second place	2022 Granada	10m Air Pistol
Silver medal – second place	2022 Ruse	10m Air Pistol Team
Universiade
Silver medal – second place	2011 Shenzhen	50m Pistol

Damir Mikec (Serbian Cyrillic: Дамир Микец; born 31 March 1984) is a Serbian sport shooter.

== Biography ==
Mikec represented Serbia at the 2008 Summer Olympics in Beijing, People's Republic of China. He earned his qualification by finishing 6th at the 2007 World Cup #1 Rifle, Pistol in Fort Benning, United States of America. In Beijing, Mikec reached the final in 50 metre pistol and finished 7th. In 10 metre air pistol he missed the final by a one-point margin and finished 13th.

Mikec won a silver medal in 50 metre pistol at the 2009 ISSF World Cup in Munich.

At the 2012 Summer Olympics, he came as world's number one at the world rank list, again competed in the 10 metre air pistol and the 50 metre pistol, finishing in 17th and 16th positions respectively.

At the 2016 Summer Olympics in Rio de Janeiro, he finished 18th in the 50m pistol event and 25th in the 10m air pistol event.

At the 2020 Summer Olympics, he competed in the 10 metre air pistol finishing second, granting Serbia its first medal at the Games. Partnering Zorana Arunović, he finished fourth in the 10m air pistol mixed team.

At the 2024 Summer Olympics, he competed in both the Men's 10 metre air pistol, where he placed seventh, and the mixed 10 metre air pistol team, where he finished in first alongside Zorana Arunović.

== Personal life ==
His paternal grandparents hail from Novo Mesto, but due to his grandfather's engagement in the Yugoslav People's Army, his father was born in Bitola. His father was in the Army as well, and met his mother, a discus thrower, in Senta while located there at the time. Because of his older brothers Igor and Goran's respiratory problems, his family moved to Split–where he was born–due to the benefits of sea air and climate. After the outbreak of the Croatian War of Independence, his family moved to Herceg Novi. Finally, in 1997, his family moved to Petlovo Brdo, Belgrade, where he finished the last grade of primary school and started secondary school. After the NATO bombing of Yugoslavia, he started training shooting at the urging of his mother and Srećko Pejović.

He was married to Salvadoran sports shooter Melissa Pérez, whom he met in 2005. They married in 2011 in the Ružica Church. Despite plans for another wedding in El Salvador, the Catholic Church there would not agree on a compromise due to Mikec's Eastern Orthodox faith, unlike the Serbian Orthodox Church who did agree on a compromise due to Pérez's Roman Catholic faith. The couple have two children, a son Milan Ricardo (b. 2015) and Mia Vanessa (b. 2020). They divorced in 2024.
