= 2014 European 10 m Events Championships =

- Dates: 26 February - 3 March
- Host city: Moscow, Russia
- Level: Senior
- Events: 4 men + 4 women

The 2014 European 10 m Events Championships were held in Moscow, Russia, from February 26 to March 3, 2014.

== Men's events ==
Event	Gold	Silver	Bronze
Pistol	Oleh Omelchuk (UKR)	Vitali Kudzi (BLR)	João Costa (POR)
Pistol TEAM	Ukraine	Italy	Belarus
Running Target	Łukasz Czapla (POL)	Vladyslav Prianishnikov (UKR)	József Sike (HUN)
Running Target TEAM	Hungary	Russia	Finland
Running Target Mixed	Krister Holmberg (FIN)	Vladyslav Prianishnikov (UKR)	Emil Martinsson (SWE)
Running Target Mixed TEAM	Finland	Russia	Hungary
Rifle	Oleh Tsarkov (UKR)	Vitali Bubnovich (BLR)	Nazar Luguinets (RUS)
Rifle TEAM	Belarus	Ukraine	Russia

== Women's events ==
Event	Gold	Silver	Bronze
Pistol	Stefanie Thurmann (GER)	Monika Karsch (GER)	Viktoriya Chaika (BLR)
Pistol TEAM	Russia	Germany	France
Running Target	Viktoriya Rybovalova (UKR)	Olga Stepanova (RUS)	Galina Avramenko (UKR)
Running Target TEAM	Russia	Ukraine	Not awarded
Running Target Mixed	Olga Stepanova (RUS)	Galina Avramenko (UKR)	Irina Izmalkova (RUS)
Running Target Mixed TEAM	Russia	Ukraine	Not awarded
Rifle	Julianna Miskolczi (HUN)	Andrea Arsović (SRB)	Ivana Maksimović (SRB)
Rifle TEAM	Serbia	Germany	Italy

== Mixed events ==
Event	Gold	Silver	Bronze
Rifle	Sergei Kruglov; Daria Vdovina (RUS)	Malin Westerheim; Are Hansen (NOR)	Petra Zublasing; Niccolò Campriani (ITA)
Pistol	Liubov Yaskevich; Anton Gurianov (RUS)	Bobana Veličković; Damir Mikec (SRB)	Viktoriya Chaika; Yuri Dauhapolau (BLR)

== Medal table ==
Rank	Nation	Gold	Silver	Bronze	Total
1	Russia (RUS)	6	3	3	12
2	Ukraine (UKR)	4	6	1	11
3	Hungary (HUN)	2	0	2	4
4	Finland (FIN)	2	0	1	3
5	Germany (GER)	1	3	0	4
6	Belarus (BLR)	1	2	3	6
7	Serbia (SRB)	1	2	1	4
8	Poland (POL)	1	0	0	1
9	Italy (ITA)	0	1	2	3
10	Norway (NOR)	0	1	0	1
11	France (FRA)	0	0	1	1
11	Portugal (POR)	0	0	1	1
11	Sweden (SWE)	0	0	1	1
Totals (13 entries)		18	18	16	52

== See also ==
- European Shooting Confederation
- International Shooting Sport Federation
- List of medalists at the European Shooting Championships
- List of medalists at the European Shotgun Championships
