= 2008 European 10 m Events Championships =

- Dates: 24 February - 2 March
- Host city: Winterthur, Switzerland
- Level: Senior
- Events: 4 men + 4 women
- Participation: 385 athletes from 41 nations

The 2008 European 10 m Events Championships was held in Winterthur, Switzerland, from February 25 to March 2, 2008. Competitions were contested at the Eulachhalle.

== Participating countries ==
385 shooters from 41 countries participated in this championships.

- Armenia (3)
- Austria (14)
- Belgium (9)
- Belarus (10)
- Bosnia and Herzegovina (4)
- Bulgaria (10)
- Croatia (11)
- Czech Republic (15)
- Denmark (6)
- Estonia (11)
- Finland (14)
- France (13)
- Georgia (5)
- Germany (16)
- United Kingdom (5)
- Greece (12)
- Hungary (15)
- Iceland (2)
- Israel (11)
- Italy (12)
- Latvia (8)
- Liechtenstein (3)
- Lithuania (10)
- Luxembourg (9)
- Moldova (2)
- Monaco (2)
- Montenegro (7)
- Netherlands (4)
- Norway (10)
- Poland (12)
- Portugal (8)
- Romania (5)
- Russia (18)
- San Marino (3)
- Serbia (12)
- Slovakia (12)
- Slovenia (12)
- Spain (12)
- Sweden (12)
- Switzerland (12)
- Turkey (1)
- Ukraine (18)

== Results ==
=== Men ===
Event	Gold	Silver	Bronze
Rifle	Are Hansen (NOR)	Sergéi Kruglov (RUS)	Jozef Gönci (SVK)
Rifle (teams)	Russia	Slovakia	Serbia
Pistol	Leonid Ekimov (RUS)	Walter Lapeyre (FRA)	Tanyu Kiriakov (BUL)
Pistol (teams)	Russia	Germany	Italy
Running target	Vladislav Prianishnikov (UKR)	Łukasz Czapla (POL)	Alexander Zinenko (UKR)
Running target (teams)	Ukraine	Russia	Czech Republic
Running target mixed	Vladislav Prianishnikov (UKR)	Niklas Bergström (SWE)	Aleksandr Blinov (RUS)
Running target mixed (teams)	Ukraine	Russia	Czech Republic

=== Women ===
Event	Gold	Silver	Bronze
Rifle	Liubov Galkina (RUS)	Kateřina Emmons (CZE)	Olga Desiatskaya (RUS)
Rifle (teams)	Germany	Poland	Czech Republic
Pistol	Viktoria Chaika (BLR)	Nino Salukvadze (GEO)	Natalia Paderina (RUS)
Pistol (teams)	Russia	Belarus	Ukraine
Running target	Halyna Avramenko (UKR)	Irina Izmalkova (RUS)	Yulia Eydenzon (RUS)
Running target (teams)	Russia	Ukraine	Germany
Running target mixed	Halyna Avramenko (UKR)	Olga Stepanova (RUS)	Viktoria Zabolotna (UKR)
Running target mixed (teams)	Ukraine	Russia	Germany

== Medal table ==
Rank	Nation	Gold	Silver	Bronze	Total
1	Ukraine (UKR)	7	1	3	11
2	Russia (RUS)	6	6	4	16
3	Germany (GER)	1	1	2	4
4	Belarus (BLR)	1	1	0	2
5	Norway (NOR)	1	0	0	1
6	Poland (POL)	0	2	0	2
7	Czech Republic (CZE)	0	1	3	4
8	Slovakia (SVK)	0	1	1	2
9	France (FRA)	0	1	0	1
9	Georgia (GEO)	0	1	0	1
9	Sweden (SWE)	0	1	0	1
12	Bulgaria (BUL)	0	0	1	1
12	Italy (ITA)	0	0	1	1
12	Serbia (SRB)	0	0	1	1
Totals (14 entries)		16	16	16	48

== See also ==
- European Shooting Confederation
- International Shooting Sport Federation
- List of medalists at the European Shooting Championships
- List of medalists at the European Shotgun Championships
