= Viktoriya Rybovalova =

Ukrainian sport shooter

Personal information
- Nationality: Ukrainian
- Born: 8 April 1986 (age 40) Kryvyi Rih, Ukraine
- Years active: 1999–
- Height: 1.58 m (5 ft 2 in)
- Weight: 48 kg (106 lb)

Sport
- Country: Ukraine
- Sport: Shooting
- Event: 10RT20, 10RT20MIX
- Club: Dinamo
- Coached by: Gennadi Avramenko, Chapala Genadi
Medal record
Event	1st	2nd	3rd
World Championships	1	4	2
European Championships	1	3	2
World Championships
Gold medal – first place	2022 Châteauroux	10 m running target
Gold medal – first place	2023 Baku	10 m running target team
Silver medal – second place	2008 Plzeň	10RT20MIX
Silver medal – second place	2009 Heinola	10RT20MIX
Silver medal – second place	2014 Granada	10RT20
Silver medal – second place	2018 Changwon	10 m team running target mixed
Silver medal – second place	2023 Baku	10 m running target mixed team
Bronze medal – third place	2009 Heinola	10RT20
Bronze medal – third place	2006 Zagreb	10RT20
European Championships
Gold medal – first place	2016 Győr	10RT20
Gold medal – first place	2025 Chateauroux	10 m Running Target
Gold medal – first place	2025 Chateauroux	10 m Running Target Team
Gold medal – first place	2025 Chateauroux	50 m Running Target Team
Gold medal – first place	2026 Yerevan	10 m running target Mixed
Gold medal – first place	2026 Yerevan	10 m running target Team
Gold medal – first place	2026 Yerevan	10 m running target Mixed Team
Silver medal – second place	2009 Prague	10RT20
Silver medal – second place	2009 Prague	10RT20MIX
Silver medal – second place	2011 Brescia	10RT20
Silver medal – second place	2018 Győr	10RT20
Silver medal – second place	2025 Chateauroux	10 m Running Target Mixed
Bronze medal – third place	2005 Tallinn	10RT20
Bronze medal – third place	2016 Győr	10RT20MIX
Bronze medal – third place	2025 Chateauroux	10 m Running Target Mixed Team
World Junior Championships
Silver medal – second place	2002 Lahti	10RT20
European Junior Championships
Gold medal – first place	2002 Thessaloniki	10RT20MIX
Bronze medal – third place	2002 Thessaloniki	10RT20

Viktoriya Rybovalova (Ukrainian: Вікторія Рибовалова, born 8 April 1986) is a Ukrainian shooter, who competes in running target competitions.

== Career ==
At the 2025 European Shooting Championships in Chateroux, she won individual and team gold medals in the 10 m Running Target event with Halyna Avramenko and Valentyna Honcharova.
