= 2006 European 10 m Events Championships =

- Dates: 27 February - 2 March
- Host city: Moscow, Russia
- Level: Senior
- Events: 4 men + 4 women

The 2006 European 10 m Events Championships were held in Moscow, Russia.

== Men's events ==
Event	Gold	Silver	Bronze
Pistol	Tanyu Kiriakov (BUL)	Norayr Bakhtamyan (ARM)	Walter Lapeyre (FRA)
Rifle	Mario Knoegler (AUT)	Sergey Kruglov (RUS)	Artem Khadjibekov (RUS)
Running Target	Miroslav Janus (CZE)	Vladyslav Prianishnikov (UKR)	Dimitri Lykin (RUS)
Running Target Mixed	Niklas Bergstroem (SWE)	Miroslav Janus (CZE)	Emil Martinsson (SWE)

== Women's events ==
Event	Gold	Silver	Bronze
Pistol	Susanne Meyerhoff (DEN)	Natalia Paderina (RUS)	Beata Bartkow Kwiatkowska (POL)
Rifle	Tatiana Goldobina (RUS)	Sonja Pfeilschifter (GER)	Katerina Emmons (CZE)
Running Target	Audrey Corenflos (FRA)	Halyna Avramenko (UKR)	Volha Markava (BLR)
Running Target Mixed	Audrey Corenflos (FRA)	Julia Eydenzon (RUS)	Volha Markava (BLR)

== Medal table ==
Rank	Nation	Gold	Silver	Bronze	Total
1	France (FRA)	2	0	1	3
2	Russia (RUS)	1	3	2	6
3	Czech Republic (CZE)	1	1	1	3
4	Sweden (SWE)	1	0	1	2
5	Austria (AUT)	1	0	0	1
5	Bulgaria (BUL)	1	0	0	1
5	Denmark (DEN)	1	0	0	1
8	Ukraine (UKR)	0	2	0	2
9	Armenia (ARM)	0	1	0	1
9	Germany (GER)	0	1	0	1
11	Belarus (BLR)	0	0	2	2
12	Poland (POL)	0	0	1	1
Totals (12 entries)		8	8	8	24

== See also ==
- European Shooting Confederation
- International Shooting Sport Federation
- List of medalists at the European Shooting Championships
- List of medalists at the European Shotgun Championships
