= 2015 European 10 m Events Championships =

- Dates: 2 - 8 March
- Host city: Arnhem, Netherlands
- Level: Senior
- Events: 4 men + 4 women

The 2015 European 10 m Events Championships were held in Arnhem, Netherlands, from March 3 to 7, 2015.

== Men's events ==
Event	Gold	Silver	Bronze
Pistol	Philipp Grimm (GER)	Damir Mikec (SRB)	Anton Gurianov (RUS)
Pistol TEAM	Germany	Russia	Serbia
Running Target	Maxim Stepanov (RUS)	Dmitry Romanov (RUS)	Emil Martinsson (SWE)
Running Target TEAM	Russia	Czech Republic	Hungary
Running Target Mixed	Emil Martinsson (SWE)	László Boros (HUN)	Tomi-Pekka Heikkilä (FIN)
Running Target Mixed TEAM	Finland	Russia	Czech Republic
Rifle	Anton Rizov (BUL)	Niccolò Campriani (ITA)	Illia Charheika (BLR)
Rifle TEAM	Russia	Italy	Belarus

== Women's events ==
Event	Gold	Silver	Bronze
Pistol	Olena Kostevych (UKR)	Antoaneta Boneva (BUL)	Renáta Tobai-Sike (HUN)
Pistol TEAM	Russia	France	Poland
Running Target	Irina Izmalkova (RUS)	Daniela Vogelbacher (GER)	Olga Stepanova (RUS)
Running Target TEAM	Not held due to insufficient number of participants		
Running Target Mixed	Irina Izmalkova (RUS)	Olga Stepanova (RUS)	Anne Weigel (GER)
Running Target Mixed TEAM	Russia	Germany	Not awarded
Rifle	Selina Gschwandtner (GER)	Sabrina Sena (ITA)	Nina Laura Kreutzer (GER)
Rifle TEAM	Germany	Czech Republic	Italy

== Mixed events ==
Event	Gold	Silver	Bronze
Rifle	Andrea Arsović; Milutin Stefanović (SRB)	Snježana Pejčić; Petar Gorša (CRO)	Sergei Kruglov; Anna Zhukova (RUS)
Pistol	Joana Castelão; João Costa (POR)	Yekaterina Korshunova; Vladimir Isakov (RUS)	Vitalina Batsarashkina; Vladimir Goncharov (RUS)

== Medal table ==
Rank	Nation	Gold	Silver	Bronze	Total
1	Russia (RUS)	7	5	4	16
2	Germany (GER)	4	2	2	8
3	Serbia (SRB)	1	1	1	3
4	Bulgaria (BUL)	1	1	0	2
5	Finland (FIN)	1	0	1	2
5	Sweden (SWE)	1	0	1	2
7	Portugal (POR)	1	0	0	1
7	Ukraine (UKR)	1	0	0	1
9	Italy (ITA)	0	3	1	4
10	Czech Republic (CZE)	0	2	1	3
11	Hungary (HUN)	0	1	2	3
12	Croatia (CRO)	0	1	0	1
12	France (FRA)	0	1	0	1
14	Belarus (BLR)	0	0	2	2
15	Poland (POL)	0	0	1	1
Totals (15 entries)		17	17	16	50

== See also ==
- European Shooting Confederation
- International Shooting Sport Federation
- List of medalists at the European Shooting Championships
- List of medalists at the European Shotgun Championships
