= 2013 European 10 m Events Championships =

- Dates: 25 February – 3 March
- Host city: Odense, Denmark
- Level: Senior
- Events: 4 men + 4 women

The 2013 European 10 m Events Championships were held in Odense, Denmark from February 25 to March 3, 2013.

== Men's events ==
Event	Gold	Silver	Bronze
Pistol	Leonid Ekimov (RUS)	Anton Gourianov (RUS)	Pablo Carrera (ESP)
Pistol TEAM	Russia	Serbia	Ukraine
Running Target	Vladyslav Prianishnikov (UKR)	Lukasz Czapla (POL)	Emil Martinsson (SWE)
Running Target TEAM	Finland	Russia	Ukraine
Running Target Mixed	Emil Martinsson (SWE)	Vladyslav Prianishnikov (UKR)	Maxim Stepanov (RUS)
Running Target Mixed TEAM	Finland	Ukraine	Russia
Rifle	Sergey Richter (ISR)	Vitali Bubnovich (BLR)	Juho Kurki (FIN)
Rifle TEAM	Italy	Russia	Belarus

== Women's events ==
Event	Gold	Silver	Bronze
Pistol	Celine Goberville (FRA)	Marija Marovic (CRO)	Viktoria Chaika (BLR)
Pistol TEAM	Serbia	Ukraine	Germany
Running Target	Galina Avramenko (UKR)	Olga Stepanova (RUS)	Julia Eydenzon (RUS)
Running Target TEAM	Russia	Ukraine	Germany
Running Target Mixed	Galina Avramenko (UKR)	Irina Izmalkova (RUS)	Daniela Vogelbacher (GER)
Running Target Mixed TEAM	Russia	Ukraine	Germany
Rifle	Lisa Ungerank (AUT)	Martina Pica (ITA)	Ziva Dvorsak (SVN)
Rifle TEAM	Italy	Germany	Austria

== Mixed events ==
Event	Gold	Silver	Bronze
Pistol	Sandra Hornung; Christian Reitz (GER)	Zorana Arunović; Damir Mikec (SRB)	Olena Kostevych; Oleh Omelchuk (UKR)
Rifle	Valérian Sauveplane; Sandy Morin (FRA)	Daria Vdovina; Serguei Kruglov (RUS)	Lisa Ungerank; Bernhard Pickl (AUT)

== Men's Junior events ==
Event	Gold	Silver	Bronze
Pistol	Dario Di Martino (ITA)	Ilya Lipkin (RUS)	Pavlo Korostylov (UKR)
Pistol TEAM	Russia	Ukraine	Latvia
Running Target	Vladyslav Shchepotkin (UKR)	Heikki Lahdekorpi (FIN)	Vladlen Onopko (UKR)
Running Target TEAM	Ukraine	Finland	Russia
Running Target Mixed	Jani Suoranta (FIN)	Vladyslav Shchepotkin (UKR)	Heikki Lahdekorpi (FIN)
Running Target Mixed TEAM	Ukraine	Finland	Armenia
Rifle	Lorenzo Bacci (ITA)	Sergiy Kasper (UKR)	Alexander Thomas (GER)
Rifle TEAM	Italy	Russia	Ukraine

== Women's Junior events ==
Event	Gold	Silver	Bronze
Pistol	Klaudia Bres (POL)	Margarita Lomova (RUS)	Anne Isabelle Rene (FRA)
Pistol TEAM	Poland	France	Russia
Running Target	Veronika Major (HUN)	Florence Louis (FRA)	Kateryna Gavriushenko (UKR)
Running Target TEAM	Ukraine	France	Russia
Running Target Mixed	Oksana Sokolova (RUS)	Veronika Major (HUN)	Florence Louis (FRA)
Running Target Mixed TEAM	Russia	France	Ukraine
Rifle	Nadine Ungerank (AUT)	Selina Gschwandtner (GER)	Malin Westerheim (NOR)
Rifle TEAM	Germany	Czech Republic	Norway

== Mixed Junior events ==
Event	Gold	Silver	Bronze
Pistol	Eleonora Mazzocoli; Dario Di Martino (ITA)	Margarita Lomova; Ilya Lipkin (RUS)	Regina Rizvanova; Aleksei Kuznetcov (RUS)
Rifle	Nadine Ungerank; Gernot Rumpler (AUT)	Yulia Diakova; Evgeny Panchenko (RUS)	Malin Westerheim; Hakon Sorli (NOR)

== Medal summary ==
=== Seniors ===
Rank	Nation	Gold	Silver	Bronze	Total
1	Russia	4	6	3	13
2	Ukraine	3	5	3	11
3	Italy	2	1	0	3
4	Finland	2	0	1	3
5	France	2	0	0	2
6	Serbia	1	2	0	3
7	Germany	1	1	4	6
8	Austria	1	0	2	3
9	Sweden	1	0	1	2
10	Israel	1	0	0	1
11	Belarus	0	1	2	3
12	Croatia	0	1	0	1
12	Poland	0	1	0	1
14	Slovenia	0	0	1	1
14	Spain	0	0	1	1
Totals (15 entries)		18	18	18	54

=== Juniors ===
Rank	Nation	Gold	Silver	Bronze	Total
1	Ukraine	4	3	5	12
2	Italy	4	0	0	4
3	Russia	3	5	4	12
4	Austria	2	0	0	2
4	Poland	2	0	0	2
6	Finland	1	3	1	5
7	Germany	1	1	1	3
8	Hungary	1	1	0	2
9	France	0	4	2	6
10	Czech Republic	0	1	0	1
11	Norway	0	0	3	3
12	Armenia	0	0	1	1
12	Latvia	0	0	1	1
Totals (13 entries)		18	18	18	54

== See also ==
- European Shooting Confederation
- International Shooting Sport Federation
- List of medalists at the European Shooting Championships
- List of medalists at the European Shotgun Championships
