= Shooting at the 2002 Asian Games – Men's 10 metre running target =

Men's 10 metre running target at the 2002 Asian Games
- Venue: Changwon International Shooting Range
- Dates: 3–4 October 2002
- Competitors: 12 from 5 nations

Medalists
gold medal	Niu Zhiyuan	China
silver medal	Her Dae-kyung	South Korea
bronze medal	Yang Ling	China

The men's 10 metre running target competition at the 2002 Asian Games in Busan, South Korea was held on 3 and 4 October at the Changwon International Shooting Range.

== Schedule ==
All times are Korea Standard Time (UTC+09:00)

Date	Time	Event
Thursday, 3 October 2002	09:00	Qualification slow
Friday, 4 October 2002	09:00	Qualification fast
Friday, 4 October 2002	15:30	Final

== Records ==
Prior to this competition, the existing world, Asian and Games records were as follows.

Qualification
World Record	Igor Kolesov (RUS)	588	Plzeň, Czech Republic	30 May 2002
Asian Record	Yang Ling (CHN)	588	Lahti, Finland	5 July 2002
Games Record	Zhang Ronghui (CHN)	573	Beijing, China	30 September 1990
Final
World Record	Yang Ling (CHN)	687.9	Milan, Italy	6 June 1996
Asian Record	Yang Ling (CHN)	687.9	Milan, Italy	6 June 1996
Games Record	—	—	—	—

== Results ==
=== Qualification ===
Rank	Athlete	Slow			Fast			Total	Notes
Rank	Athlete	1	2	3	1	2	3	Total	Notes
1	Niu Zhiyuan (CHN)	95	99	98	98	94	95	579	GR
2	Her Dae-kyung (KOR)	98	99	96	86	98	98	575	
3	Yang Ling (CHN)	98	96	97	97	96	91	575	
4	Zeng Guobin (CHN)	93	95	99	95	92	92	566	
5	Cho Se-jong (KOR)	96	94	93	97	90	90	560	
6	Jong Yong-won (PRK)	95	95	95	96	90	88	559	
7	Andrey Gurov (KAZ)	92	95	93	90	92	93	555	
8	Sergey Duzev (KAZ)	94	93	91	89	93	91	551	
9	Rustam Seitov (KAZ)	91	88	96	86	86	92	539	
10	Hwang Young-do (KOR)	93	91	94	83	85	91	537	
11	Mebkhout Al-Najem (QAT)	84	89	84	77	89	87	510	
12	Hassen Abdulla (QAT)	86	88	89	85	67	93	508	

=== Final ===
Rank	Athlete	Qual.	Final											Total	S-off	Notes
Rank	Athlete	Qual.	1	2	3	4	5	6	7	8	9	10	Total	Total	S-off	Notes
1st place, gold medalist(s)	Niu Zhiyuan (CHN)	579	6.2	10.7	10.7	10.3	9.3	10.3	10.0	10.4	10.4	9.1	97.4	676.4		GR
2nd place, silver medalist(s)	Her Dae-kyung (KOR)	575	10.8	10.1	10.4	10.4	9.6	10.6	10.6	9.0	6.7	10.5	98.7	673.7		
3rd place, bronze medalist(s)	Yang Ling (CHN)	575	9.8	10.1	10.0	8.6	8.6	9.4	9.5	10.7	8.1	10.1	94.9	669.9		
4	Zeng Guobin (CHN)	566	10.7	9.5	9.3	9.9	10.4	10.6	9.1	10.1	9.2	9.8	98.6	664.6		
5	Jong Yong-won (PRK)	559	10.2	10.0	7.0	9.3	10.0	9.5	10.1	8.5	8.5	10.8	93.9	652.9		
6	Cho Se-jong (KOR)	560	10.5	8.4	10.1	7.7	9.1	9.7	10.4	9.2	9.9	6.9	91.9	651.9		
