= 2005 European 10 m Events Championships =

2004 European 10 m Events Championships
- Dates: 28 February - 2 March
- Host city: Tallinn, Estonia
- Level: Senior
- Events: 4 men + 4 women

The 2005 European 10 m Events Championships were held in Tallinn, Estonia.

== Men's events ==
| Event | Gold | Silver | Bronze |
|---|---|---|---|
| Pistol | Walter Lapeyre (FRA) | Norayr Bakhtamyan (ARM) | Franck Dumoulin (FRA) |
| Rifle | Zoltan Balaz (SVK) | Are Hansen (NOR) | Jozef Gonci (SVK) |
| Running Target | Niklas Bergstroem (SWE) | Maxim Stepanov (RUS) | Manfred Kurzer (GER) |
| Running Target Mixed | Manfred Kurzer (GER) | Vladyslav Prianishnikov (UKR) | Maxim Stepanov (RUS) |

== Women's events ==
| Event | Gold | Silver | Bronze |
|---|---|---|---|
| Pistol | Svetlana Smirnova (RUS) | Nino Salukvadze (GEO) | Olga Kousnetsova (RUS) |
| Rifle | Barbara Engleder (GER) | Lioubov Galkina (RUS) | Agnieszka Nagay (POL) |
| Running Target | Halyna Avramenko (UKR) | Audrey Corenflos (FRA) | Viktoriya Rybovalova (UKR) |
| Running Target Mixed | Audrey Corenflos (FRA) | Halyna Avramenko (UKR) | Irina Izmalkova (RUS) |

== Medal table ==
| Rank | Nation | Gold | Silver | Bronze | Total |
|---|---|---|---|---|---|
| 1 | France (FRA) | 2 | 1 | 1 | 4 |
| 2 | Germany (GER) | 2 | 0 | 1 | 3 |
| 3 | Russia (RUS) | 1 | 2 | 3 | 6 |
| 4 | Ukraine (UKR) | 1 | 2 | 1 | 4 |
| 5 | Slovakia (SVK) | 1 | 0 | 1 | 2 |
| 6 | Sweden (SWE) | 1 | 0 | 0 | 1 |
| 7 | Armenia (ARM) | 0 | 1 | 0 | 1 |
| 7 | Georgia (GEO) | 0 | 1 | 0 | 1 |
| 7 | Norway (NOR) | 0 | 1 | 0 | 1 |
| 10 | Poland (POL) | 0 | 0 | 1 | 1 |
| Totals (10 entries) | | 8 | 8 | 8 | 24 |

== See also ==
- European Shooting Confederation
- International Shooting Sport Federation
- List of medalists at the European Shooting Championships
- List of medalists at the European Shotgun Championships
