= Shooting at the 2006 Asian Games – Men's 10 metre running target =

Men's 10 metre running target at the 2006 Asian Games
- Venue: Lusail Shooting Range
- Dates: 5 December 2006
- Competitors: 13 from 5 nations

Medalists
gold medal	Gan Lin	China
silver medal	Rassim Mologly	Kazakhstan
bronze medal	Mohammed Amin Sobhi	Qatar

The men's 10 metre running target competition at the 2006 Asian Games in Doha, Qatar was held on 5 December at the Lusail Shooting Range.

== Schedule ==
All times are Arabia Standard Time (UTC+03:00)

Date	Time	Event
Tuesday, 5 December 2006	08:00	Slow
Tuesday, 5 December 2006	10:30	Fast

== Records ==
Prior to this competition, the existing world, Asian and Games records were as follows.

World Record	Manfred Kurzer (GER)	590	Athens, Greece	19 August 2004
Asian Record	Yang Ling (CHN)	588	Lahti, Finland	5 July 2002
Games Record	Niu Zhiyuan (CHN)	579	Busan, South Korea	4 October 2002

== Results ==
Rank	Athlete	Slow			Fast			Total	S-off	Notes
Rank	Athlete	1	2	3	1	2	3	Total	S-off	Notes
1st place, gold medalist(s)	Gan Lin (CHN)	99	99	95	99	93	94	579		
2nd place, silver medalist(s)	Rassim Mologly (KAZ)	97	95	96	93	95	91	567		
3rd place, bronze medalist(s)	Mohammed Amin Sobhi (QAT)	94	96	95	90	95	95	565		
4	Bakhtiyar Ibrayev (KAZ)	95	88	97	96	92	96	564		
5	Cho Se-jong (KOR)	97	99	93	88	89	97	563		
6	Andrey Gurov (KAZ)	95	93	94	95	93	92	562		
7	Jeong You-jin (KOR)	93	91	93	93	97	93	560		
8	Hwang Young-do (KOR)	94	92	99	93	87	91	556		
9	Mohammed Abouteama (QAT)	91	92	96	87	94	93	553		
10	Khalid Al-Kuwari (QAT)	90	94	93	95	89	87	548		
11	Trần Hoàng Vũ (VIE)	92	91	87	84	96	93	543		
12	Nguyễn Văn Tùng (VIE)	97	94	88	86	87	88	540		
13	Nguyễn Mạnh Cường (VIE)	93	91	88	87	95	86	540		
