= Oleh Omelchuk =

Ukrainian sport shooter (born 1983)

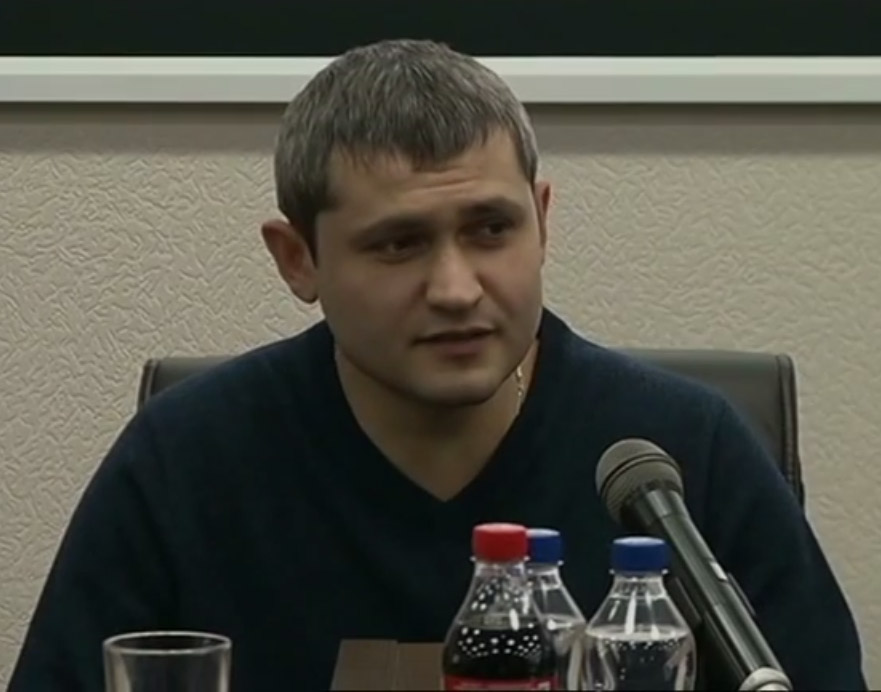
- Omelchuk in 2013

Personal information
- Full name: Oleh Petrovych Omelchuk
- Nationality: Ukrainian
- Born: 7 June 1983 (age 43) Velyki Selyshcha, Rivne Oblast, Ukrainian SSR, Soviet Union
- Height: 1.69 m (5 ft 7 in)
- Weight: 70 kg (154 lb)

Sport
- Country: Ukraine
- Sport: Shooting
- Event(s): FP, AP60
- Club: CSKA
- Coached by: Serghiy Bondar; Oleksandr Kaminsky
Medal record
Men's shooting
Representing Ukraine
Olympic Games
Bronze medal – third place	2020 Tokyo	Mixed 10 m air pistol
World Championships
Bronze medal – third place	2018 Changwon	Air pistol mixed team
Bronze medal – third place	2025 Cairo	50 m meter pistol team
European Games
Silver medal – second place	2019 Minsk	10 m pistol
European Championships
Gold medal – first place	2014 Moscow	10 m pistol
Gold medal – first place	2019 Osijek	Air pistol mixed team
Gold medal – first place	2021 Osijek	50 m pistol open
Gold medal – first place	2024 Győr	10 m air pistol mixed team
Gold medal – first place	2025 Châteauroux	50 m Pistol Team
Silver medal – second place	2016 Győr	Air pistol mixed team
Silver medal – second place	2024 Győr	10 m air pistol team
Silver medal – second place	2025 Châteauroux	50 m Pistol
Bronze medal – third place	2011 Brescia	10 m pistol
Bronze medal – third place	2013 Odense	Air pistol mixed team
Bronze medal – third place	2018 Győr	Air pistol mixed team
Bronze medal – third place	2025 Osijek	10 m air pistol team

Oleh Petrovych Omelchuk (Ukrainian: Олег Петрович Омельчук; born 7 June 1983) is a Ukrainian sport shooter who competes in the men's 10 metre air pistol and the men's 50 metre pistol. (Note: "Oleh Omelchuk". London 2012. The London Organising Committee of the Olympic Games and Paralympic Games Limited.) He is the 2014 European 10 m pistol champion.

== Career ==
Omelchuk has represented Ukraine at three Olympics. At the 2008 Summer Olympics, he finished in 16th place in the men's 10 m air pistol, and in 4th place in the 50 m pistol, losing out on the bronze medal to Russia's Vladimir Isakov in a shoot-off.

At the 2012 Summer Olympics, Omelchuk finished 5th in the final round of the men's 10 m air pistol and in 29th place in the men's 50 m pistol. He also competed at the 2016 Summer Olympics in Rio de Janeiro.

On 27 July 2021, at the 2020 Summer Olympics in Tokyo, Oleh Omelchuk and Olena Kostevych won a bronze medal in the 10 m air pistol.
