= 1957 European Shooting Championships =

- Dates: 8 - 10 October
- Host city: Belgrade, Yugoslavia
- Level: Senior
- Events: 2 men + 2 women (individual); 2 men + 2 women (team)

The 1957 European Shooting Championships was the 2nd edition of the global shooting competition, European Shooting Championships, organised by the International Shooting Sport Federation.

== Results ==
=== Men ===
Event	Gold		Silver		Bronze	
Event	Athletes	Pts	Athletes	Pts	Athletes	Pts
50 m standard rifle 3 position	(West Germany) Rudolf Sigl	585	(Soviet Union) Vladimir Sapunov	579	(Soviet Union) Yuri Kudryashov	578
50 m standard rifle 3 position, team	Soviet Union; Vladimir Sapunov; Yuri Kudryashov......					
50 yd and 100 yd rifle prone	(Soviet Union) Gennadiy Shvedov	593	(Socialist Federal Republic of Yugoslavia) Branko Korasic	591	(Soviet Union) Nikolay Pestanov	591
50 yd and 100 yd rifle prone, team	Soviet Union; Gennadiy Shvedov; Nikolay Pestanov......					

=== Women ===
Event	Gold		Silver		Bronze	
Event	Athlete	Pts	Athlete	Pts	Athlete	Pts
50 m standard rifle 3 position	(Soviet Union) Sinaida Kormushkina	584	(Czechoslovakia) Eliska Stara	581	(Soviet Union) Ruffa Temnikova	577
50 m standard rifle 3 position, team	Soviet Union; Sinaida Kormushkina; Tamara Lomova; Galina Novoderova; Ruffa Temnikova					
50 yd and 100 yd rifle prone	(Soviet Union) Galina Novoderova	593	(Soviet Union) Tamara Lomova	591	(Hungary) Istvanne Veress	589
50 yd and 100 yd rifle prone, team	Soviet Union; Sinaida Kormushkina; Tamara Lomova; Galina Novoderova; Tamara Vasilyeva					

== Medal table ==
Host country

#	Country	1st place, gold medalist(s)	2nd place, silver medalist(s)	3rd place, bronze medalist(s)	Tot.
1	Soviet Union	7	2	3	12
2	West Germany	1	0	0	1
3	Yugoslavia	0	1	0	1
4	Czechoslovakia	0	1	0	1
6	Hungary	0	0	1	1
Total		8	4	4	14

== See also ==
- 1957 European Shotgun Championships
- European Shooting Confederation
- International Shooting Sport Federation
- List of medalists at the European Shooting Championship
