= Olena Kostevych =

Ukrainian pistol shooter (born 1985)

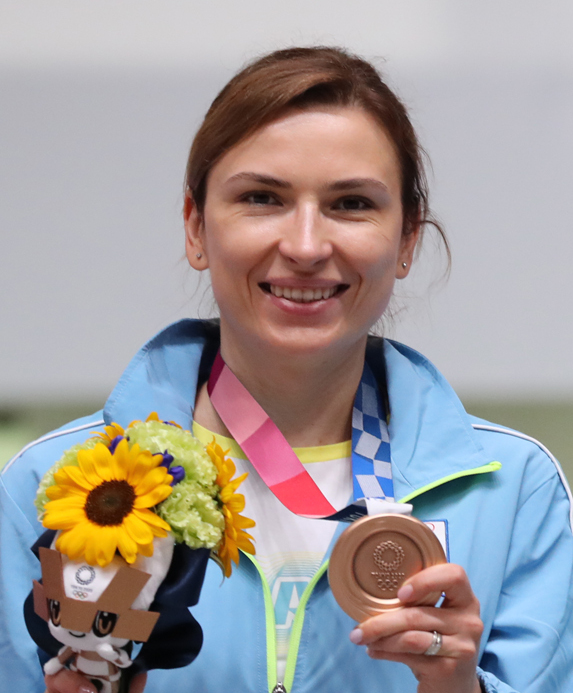
- Kostevych at the 2020 Summer Olympics

Personal information
- Full name: Olena Dmytrivna Kostevych
- Nationality: Ukrainian
- Born: 14 April 1985 (age 41) Khabarovsk, Russian SFSR, Soviet Union
- Education: Chernihiv State Technological University
- Years active: 2000–
- Height: 1.62 m (5 ft 4 in)
- Weight: 53 kg (117 lb)

Sport
- Country: Ukraine
- Sport: Shooting
- Event(s): AP40, SP
- Club: Dinamo
- Coached by: Igor Cheredinov
Medal record
Women's shooting
Representing Ukraine
Event	1st	2nd	3rd
Olympic Games	1	0	3
World Championships	2	2	2
European Games	1	0	2
European Championships	7	10	6
Universiade	3	2	4
Olympic Games
Gold medal – first place	2004 Athens	10 m air pistol
Bronze medal – third place	2012 London	10 m air pistol
Bronze medal – third place	2012 London	25 m pistol
Bronze medal – third place	2020 Tokyo	Mixed 10 m air pistol
World Championships
Gold medal – first place	2002 Lahti	10 m air pistol
Gold medal – first place	2018 Changwon	25 m pistol
Silver medal – second place	2014 Granada	10 m air pistol
Silver medal – second place	2023 Baku	25 m pistol
Bronze medal – third place	2018 Changwon	10 m air pistol mixed team
Bronze medal – third place	2022 Cairo	25 m standard pistol mixed team
European Games
Gold medal – first place	2023 Kraków-Małopolska	25 m pistol team
Bronze medal – third place	2019 Minsk	25 m standard pistol mixed team
Bronze medal – third place	2023 Kraków-Małopolska	10 m air pistol
European Championships
Gold medal – first place	2015 Arnhem	10 m air pistol
Gold medal – first place	2015 Maribor	25 m pistol team
Gold medal – first place	2016 Győr	10 m air pistol
Gold medal – first place	2019 Osijek	10 m air pistol mixed team
Gold medal – first place	2021 Osijek	10 m air pistol team
Gold medal – first place	2022 Hamar	10 m air pistol
Gold medal – first place	2024 Győr	10 m air pistol mixed team
Silver medal – second place	2003 Gothenburg	10 m air pistol
Silver medal – second place	2004 Győr	10 m air pistol
Silver medal – second place	2012 Vierumäki	10 m air pistol
Silver medal – second place	2016 Győr	10 m air pistol mixed team
Silver medal – second place	2017 Maribor	10 m air pistol
Silver medal – second place	2019 Osijek	10 m air pistol team
Silver medal – second place	2019 Bologna	25 m standard pistol mixed team
Silver medal – second place	2022 Wrocław	25 m pistol team
Silver medal – second place	2024 Győr	10 m air pistol team
Silver medal – second place	2026 Osijek	25 m standard pistol
Bronze medal – third place	2011 Brescia	10 m air pistol
Bronze medal – third place	2013 Odense	10 m air pistol mixed team
Bronze medal – third place	2015 Maribor	25 m pistol
Bronze medal – third place	2018 Győr	10 m air pistol mixed team
Bronze medal – third place	2019 Bologna	50 m pistol mixed team
Bronze medal – third place	2025 Osijek	10 m air pistol trio
Universiade
Gold medal – first place	2007 Banghkok	10 m air pistol team
Gold medal – first place	2011 Shenzhen	25 m pistol team
Gold medal – first place	2013 Kazan	25 m pistol
Silver medal – second place	2007 Banghkok	10 m air pistol
Silver medal – second place	2013 Kazan	25 m pistol team
Bronze medal – third place	2007 Banghkok	25 m pistol team
Bronze medal – third place	2011 Shenzhen	10 m air pistol
Bronze medal – third place	2011 Shenzhen	25 m pistol
Bronze medal – third place	2011 Shenzhen	10 m air pistol team

Olena Dmytrivna Kostevych (Ukrainian: Олена Дмитрівна Костевич, born 14 April 1985) is a Ukrainian pistol shooter. She is the 2004 Olympic champion in the 10 metre air pistol event, 2002 World champion in 10 m air pistol event and 2018 World champion in 25 m pistol event. She is also multiple European Championships champion and medalist as well as Universiade champion.

== Personal life ==
Kostevych was born in Khabarovsk, Russian SFSR, Soviet Union. She moved to her mother's city Chernihiv and she was a student at the Chernihiv State Technological University in Chernihiv, Ukraine.

== Career ==
Kostevych competes for Ukraine. At the age of 17, she won the 10 m air pistol event at the 2002 ISSF World Shooting Championships. She followed this with a victory in the 2003 ISSF World Cup Final, and an Olympic gold medal at the 2004 Olympics in Athens.

At the 2008 Summer Olympics, she placed 26th in the 25 metre pistol event and 31st in 10 metre air pistol. Her Ukrainian record of 394 is one point higher than the world record.

At the 2012 Summer Olympics in London, Kostevych won bronze medals in the 10 metre air pistol and 25 meter sport pistol competitions. She won no medals at the 2016 Summer Olympics in Rio de Janeiro.

At the 2020 Summer Olympics (Tokyo, 25 July 2021), she won 4th place in the 10 metre air pistol competition; on 27 July 2021 Olena Kostevych and Oleg Omelchuk won a bronze medal in the ten-metre air pistol.

== Olympic results ==
Event	2004	2008	2012	2016	2020
10 metre air pistol	(gold) Gold; 384+99.3	31st 378	(bronze) Bronze; 387+99.6	28th 378	4th 197.6
25 metre pistol	27th 569	26th 575	(bronze) Bronze; 788.6	22nd 575	23rd 579
10 metre air pistol mixed team	-	-	-	-	(bronze) Bronze

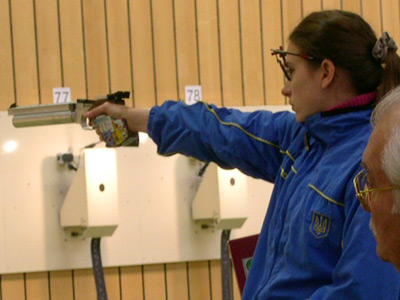
Olena Kostevych
World Cup'06 in Munich, Women's Air Pistol event

== Records ==
Current world records held in 10 meter air pistol
Women	Qualification	591	Jiang Ranxin (CHN)	Oct 15, 2022	Cairo (EGY)

Olympic Games
Preceded by Mykola Milchev	Flagbearer for Ukraine (with Bohdan Nikishyn); Tokyo 2020	Succeeded by Incumbent
