= 2007 European 10 m Events Championships =

2006 European 10 m Events Championships
- Dates: 12 - 18 March
- Host city: Deauville, France
- Level: Senior
- Events: 4 men + 4 women

The 2007 European 10 m Events Championships were held in Deauville, France.

== Men's events ==
Event	Gold	Silver	Bronze
Pistol	Leonid Ekimov (RUS)	Mikhail Nestruev (RUS)	Vladimir Isakov (RUS)
Rifle	Konstantin Prikhodtchenko (RUS)	Henri Hakkinen (FIN)	Rajmond Debevec (SLO)
Running Target	Vladyslav Prianishnikov (UKR)	Maxim Stepanov (RUS)	Jozsef Sike (HUN)
Running Target Mixed	Lukasz Czapla (POL)	Vladyslav Prianishnikov (UKR)	Miroslav Janus (CZE)

== Women's events ==
Event	Gold	Silver	Bronze
Pistol	Claudia Verdicchio Krause (GER)	Mira Suhonen (FIN)	Sonia Franquet (ESP)
Rifle	Katerina Emmons (CZE)	Hanna Etula (FIN)	Sonja Pfeilschifter (GER)
Running Target	Irina Izmalkova (RUS)	Olga Stepanova (RUS)	Volha Markava (BLR)
Running Target Mixed	Audrey Corenflos (FRA)	Irina Izmalkova (RUS)	Halyna Avramenko (UKR)

== Medal table ==
Rank	Nation	Gold	Silver	Bronze	Total
1	Russia (RUS)	3	4	1	8
2	Ukraine (UKR)	1	1	1	3
3	Czech Republic (CZE)	1	0	1	2
3	Germany (GER)	1	0	1	2
5	France (FRA)	1	0	0	1
5	Poland (POL)	1	0	0	1
7	Finland (FIN)	0	3	0	3
8	Belarus (BLR)	0	0	1	1
8	Hungary (HUN)	0	0	1	1
8	Slovenia (SLO)	0	0	1	1
8	Spain (ESP)	0	0	1	1
Totals (11 entries)		8	8	8	24

== See also ==
- European Shooting Confederation
- International Shooting Sport Federation
- List of medalists at the European Shooting Championships
- List of medalists at the European Shotgun Championships
