= Halyna Avramenko =

Ukrainian sport shooter (born 1986)

Personal information
- Native name: Галина Геннадіївна Авраменко
- Nationality: Ukrainian
- Born: 13 May 1986 (age 40) Chernihiv, Ukraine
- Years active: 1998–
- Height: 1.72 m (5 ft 8 in)
- Weight: 53 kg (117 lb)

Sport
- Country: Ukraine
- Sport: Running target shooting
- Event: 10RT20, 10RT20MIX
- Club: Dynamo
- Coached by: Hennadiy Avramenko, Halyna Nazarenko
Medal record
| Event | 1st | 2nd | 3rd |
|---|---|---|---|
| World Championships | 5 | 3 | 3 |
| European Championships | 13 | 10 | 6 |
World Championships
| Gold medal – first place | 2008 Plzeň | 10RT20 |
| Gold medal – first place | 2008 Plzeň | 10RT20MIX |
| Gold medal – first place | 2009 Heinola | 10RT20 |
| Gold medal – first place | 2016 Suhl | 10RT20 |
| Gold medal – first place | 2022 Châteauroux | 10 m running target mixed |
| Gold medal – first place | 2023 Baku | 10 m running target team |
| Silver medal – second place | 2006 Zagreb | 10RT20MIX |
| Silver medal – second place | 2016 Suhl | 10RT20MIX |
| Silver medal – second place | 2018 Changwon | 10 m team running target mixed |
| Silver medal – second place | 2022 Châteauroux | 10 m running target |
| Silver medal – second place | 2023 Baku | 10 m running target mixed team |
| Bronze medal – third place | 2012 Stockholm | 10RT20MIX |
| Bronze medal – third place | 2014 Granada | 10RT20MIX |
| Bronze medal – third place | 2018 Changwon | 10RT20 |
| Bronze medal – third place | 2023 Baku | 10 m running target |
European Championships
| Gold medal – first place | 2026 Yerevan | 10 m running target Mixed Team |
| Gold medal – first place | 2026 Yerevan | 10 m running target Team |
| Gold medal – first place | 2025 Chateauroux | 50 m Running Target Team |
| Gold medal – first place | 2025 Chateauroux | 10 m Running Target Team |
| Gold medal – first place | 2019 Osijek | 10RT20MIX |
| Gold medal – first place | 2017 Maribor | 10RT20 |
| Gold medal – first place | 2017 Maribor | 10RT20MIX |
| Gold medal – first place | 2013 Odense | 10RT20 |
| Gold medal – first place | 2013 Odense | 10RT20MIX |
| Gold medal – first place | 2012 Vierumäki | 10RT20MIX |
| Gold medal – first place | 2011 Brescia | 10RT20 |
| Gold medal – first place | 2009 Prague | 10RT20 |
| Gold medal – first place | 2008 Winterthur | 10RT20 |
| Gold medal – first place | 2008 Winterthur | 10RT20MIX |
| Gold medal – first place | 2005 Tallinn | 10RT20 |
| Gold medal – first place | 2004 Győr | 10RT20 |
| Gold medal – first place | 2002 Thessaloniki | 10RT20 |
| Silver medal – second place | 2025 Chateauroux | 50 m Running Target |
| Silver medal – second place | 2019 Osijek | 10RT20 |
| Silver medal – second place | 2019 Osijek | 10RT20MIX Mixed team |
| Silver medal – second place | 2016 Győr | 10RT20 |
| Silver medal – second place | 2016 Győr | 10RT20MIX |
| Silver medal – second place | 2014 Moscow | 10RT20MIX |
| Silver medal – second place | 2006 Moscow | 10RT20 |
| Silver medal – second place | 2005 Tallinn | 10RT20MIX |
| Silver medal – second place | 2004 Győr | 10RT20MIX |
| Silver medal – second place | 2003 Gothenburg | 10RT20MIX |
| Silver medal – second place | 2002 Thessaloniki | 10RT20MIX |
| Bronze medal – third place | 2025 Chateauroux | 10 m Running Target Mixed Team |
| Bronze medal – third place | 2018 Győr | 10RT20MIX |
| Bronze medal – third place | 2014 Moscow | 10RT20 |
| Bronze medal – third place | 2012 Vierumäki | 10RT20 |
| Bronze medal – third place | 2009 Prague | 10RT20MIX |
| Bronze medal – third place | 2007 Deauville | 10RT20MIX |
| Bronze medal – third place | 2003 Gothenburg | 10RT20 |
European Junior Championships
| Gold medal – first place | 2001 Pontevedra | 10RT20MIX |
| Gold medal – first place | 2001 Pontevedra | 10RT20 |

Halyna Avramenko (Ukrainian: Галина Авраменко, born 13 May 1986) is a Ukrainian shooter who competes in running target competitions. She is a four-time World and multiple European champion and medalist.

== Career ==
Halyna was born to a family of sportspeople. Both her father and mother are shooters. Her father Hennadiy Avramenko is Olympic medalist, multiple World and European champion.

She graduated from the National Taras Shevchenko University "Chernihiv Collegium".
