= Tomáš Caknakis =

Czech sport shooter (born 1986)

Personal information
- Nationality: Czech Republic
- Born: 15 August 1986 (age 39) Krnov, Czechoslovakia
- Height: 1.76 m (5 ft 9 1/2 in)
- Weight: 64 kg (141 lb)

Sport
- Sport: Shooting
- Event(s): 10 m running target (10RT); 50 m running target (50RT)
- Club: SSK Krnov
- Coached by: Ján Kermiet

Tomáš Caknakis (born 15 August 1986) is a Czech sport shooter.

== Career ==
He has been selected to compete for the Czech Republic in running target shooting at the 2004 Summer Olympics, and has won a total of fifteen medals under the junior category in a major international competition, spanning the ISSF World Cup series, the World Championships, and the European Championships. Caknakis trains under the tutelage of 1988 Olympic marksman Ján Kermiet for the national running target team while shooting in his native Krnov.

Caknakis was among the youngest athletes (aged 17) to be selected for the Czech team at the 2004 Summer Olympics in Athens, competing in the men's 10 m running target. He managed to get a minimum qualifying standard of 580 to join with fellow marksman and 1996 Olympic bronze medalist Miroslav Januš and gain an Olympic berth for the Czech Republic, following a top five finish on his senior debut at the ISSF World Cup meet a year earlier in Munich, Germany. Upon entering the Games as a possible Olympic medal prospect, Caknakis had attained a perfect score of 100 on the third run to pull off a steady aim in the slow-target portion with 284 points. He scored a modest 276 in the fast-moving round, but could not improve much better at the very end of the qualifying stage, falling to a distant seventeenth in a 19-shooter field with a total score of 560 points, just eighteen points adrift of the Olympic final cutoff.
