= 2011 European 10 m Events Championships =

- Dates: 3 – 6 March
- Host city: Brescia, Italy
- Level: Senior
- Events: 6 men (3 individual + 3 team); 6 women (3 individual + 3 team)

The 2011 European 10 m Events Championships were held in Brescia, Italy from March 3–6, 2011.

== Men's events ==
Event	Gold	Silver	Bronze
Pistol	Franck Dumoulin (FRA)	Andrija Zlatić (SRB)	Oleh Omelchuk (UKR)
Pistol TEAM	Russia	Belarus	Serbia
Running Target	Vladyslav Prianishnikov (UKR)	Miroslav Januš (CZE)	Bedrich Jonas (CZE)
Running Target TEAM	Czech Republic	Sweden	Ukraine
Running Target Mixed	Peter Pelach (SVK)	Mikhail Azarenko (RUS)	Vladyslav Prianishnikov (UKR)
Running Target Mixed TEAM	Sweden	Russia	Czech Republic
Rifle	Péter Sidi (HUN)	Alexandre Sokolov (RUS)	Niccolò Campriani (ITA)
Rifle TEAM	Ukraine	France	Hungary

== Women's events ==
Event	Gold	Silver	Bronze
Pistol	Céline Goberville (FRA)	Viktoria Chaika (BLR)	Olena Kostevych (UKR)
Pistol TEAM	Serbia	Belarus	France
Running Target	Galina Avramenko (UKR)	Viktoriya Rybovalova (UKR)	Irina Izmalkova (RUS)
Running Target TEAM	Russia	Ukraine	Germany
Running Target Mixed	Irina Izmalkova (RUS)	Olga Stepanova (RUS)	Daniela Faust (GER)
Running Target Mixed TEAM	Russia	Ukraine	Germany
Rifle	Sonja Pfeilschifter (GER)	Marjo Yli-Kiikka (FIN)	Darya Tykhova (UKR)
Rifle TEAM	Germany	Croatia	Czech Republic

== Men's Junior events ==
Event	Gold	Silver	Bronze
Pistol	Nikolai Kilin (RUS)	Aliaksei Horbach (BLR)	Jindrich Dubovy (CZE)
Pistol TEAM	Russia	France	Belarus
Running Target	Vladlen Onopko (UKR)	Sami Heikkila (FIN)	Jani Suoranta (FIN)
Running Target TEAM	Finland	Russia	Germany
Running Target Mixed	Sami Heikkila (FIN)	Vladlen Onopko (UKR)	Ivan Serebryakov (RUS)
Running Target Mixed TEAM	Russia	Germany	Finland
Rifle	Illia Charheika (BLR)	Ivan Yordanov (BUL)	Andreas Geuther (GER)
Rifle TEAM	Germany	Belarus	Russia

== Women's Junior events ==
Event	Gold	Silver	Bronze
Pistol	Joanna Tomala (POL)	Cristina Munoz (ESP)	Adrienn Nemes (HUN)
Pistol TEAM	Poland	Bulgaria	Croatia
Running Target	Mariia Kramar (UKR)	Natalie Dols (GER)	Micaela Qvarnstrom (FIN)
Running Target TEAM	Ukraine	Germany	Russia
Running Target Mixed	Polina Barvinova (UKR)	Mariia Kramar (UKR)	Camille Dubois (FRA)
Running Target Mixed TEAM	Ukraine	Russia	Germany
Rifle	Tanja Perec (CRO)	Valeria Sokolova (RUS)	Jennifer Olry (FRA)
Rifle TEAM	Russia	Norway	Czech Republic

== Medal summary ==
=== Seniors ===
Rank	Nation	Gold	Silver	Bronze	Total
1	Russia	4	4	1	9
2	Ukraine	3	3	5	11
3	France	2	1	1	4
4	Germany	2	0	3	5
5	Czech Republic	1	1	3	5
6	Serbia	1	1	1	3
7	Sweden	1	1	0	2
8	Hungary	1	0	1	2
9	Slovakia	1	0	0	1
10	Belarus	0	3	0	3
11	Croatia	0	1	0	1
11	Finland	0	1	0	1
13	Italy	0	0	1	1
Totals (13 entries)		16	16	16	48

=== Juniors ===
Rank	Nation	Gold	Silver	Bronze	Total
1	Ukraine	5	2	0	7
2	Russia	4	3	3	10
3	Finland	2	1	3	6
4	Poland	2	0	0	2
5	Germany	1	3	3	7
6	Belarus	1	2	1	4
7	Croatia	1	0	1	2
8	Bulgaria	0	2	0	2
9	France	0	1	2	3
10	Norway	0	1	0	1
10	Spain	0	1	0	1
12	Czech Republic	0	0	2	2
13	Hungary	0	0	1	1
Totals (13 entries)		16	16	16	48

== See also ==
- European Shooting Confederation
- International Shooting Sport Federation
- List of medalists at the European Shooting Championships
- List of medalists at the European Shotgun Championships
