= Shooting at the 2004 Summer Olympics – Men's 10 metre running target =

Sports shooting at the Olympics

Men's 10 metre running target at the Games of the XXVIII Olympiad
- Venue: Markópoulo Olympic Shooting; Centre
- Date: 18 August 2004 (slow); 19 August 2004 (fast)
- Competitors: 19 from 12 nations
- Winning score: 682.4

Medalists
1st place, gold medalist(s)		Manfred Kurzer	Germany
2nd place, silver medalist(s)		Aleksandr Blinov	Russia
3rd place, bronze medalist(s)		Dimitri Lykin	Russia

The men's 10 metre running target competition at the 2004 Summer Olympics was held on 18 and 19 August at the Markópoulo Olympic Shooting Centre near Athens, Greece. Along with the women's double trap, this was the last Olympic competition in the event, before being removed from the program shortly after the Games.

The event consisted of two rounds: a qualifier and a final. In the qualifier, each shooter fired 60 shots with a running target at 10 metres distance. Scores for each shot were in increments of 1, with a maximum score of 10. The first 30 shots were in the slow-running stage, with series of 30 runs being shot within 5 seconds. The second set of 30 runs gave shooters 2.5 seconds to take each shot.

The top 6 shooters in the qualifying round moved on to the final round. There, they fired an additional 20 shots. These shots scored in increments of .1, with a maximum score of 10.9. They were fired in four series of 5 fast-running shots.

Despite a poor performance in the final, Germany's Manfred Kurzer held off a strenuous challenge from the Russian duo Aleksandr Blinov and 2002 World champion Dimitri Lykin to capture the gold medal with 682.4 points in a historic running target finale. Earlier, Kurzer set a new world record of 590, which had been added to the final score for an overall total, to grab a top seed in the prelims, augmenting two points from a global standard set by China's double Olympic champion Yang Ling in 2002. Meanwhile, Blinov took the silver at 678.0, while his fellow marksman Lykin locked the medal haul for the Russians in a 2–3 finish with a bronze-medal score of 677.1.

== Records ==
Prior to this competition, the existing world and Olympic records were as follows.

Qualification records
World record	Yang Ling (CHN)	588	Lahti, Finland	5 July 2002
Olympic record	Yang Ling (CHN)	585	Atlanta, United States	26 July 1996

Final records
World record	Yang Ling (CHN)	687.9 (586+101.9)	Milan, Italy	6 June 1996
Olympic record	Yang Ling (CHN)	686.8 (585+101.8)	Atlanta, United States	26 July 1996

== Qualification round ==
Rank	Athlete	Country	1	2	3	Slow	4	5	6	Fast	Total	Notes
1	Manfred Kurzer	Germany	98	99	99	296	97	99	98	294	590	Q, WR
2	Dimitri Lykin	Russia	99	99	95	293	98	94	99	291	584	Q
3	Li Jie	China	95	94	99	288	98	96	97	291	579	Q
4	Emil Martinsson	Sweden	95	100	97	292	94	96	96	286	578	Q
5	Aleksandr Blinov	Russia	97	100	96	293	95	94	96	285	578	Q
6	Michael Jakosits	Germany	97	99	98	294	95	94	95	284	578	Q
7	Vladyslav Prianishnikov	Ukraine	97	97	99	293	93	93	96	282	575	
8	Adam Saathoff	United States	99	98	97	294	96	90	95	281	575	
9	Andrei Kazak	Belarus	97	96	99	292	96	94	93	283	575	
10	Attila Solti	Guatemala	96	96	94	284	93	97	99	289	573	
11	Geng Hongbin	China	95	97	97	289	93	96	94	283	572	
12	Niklas Bergström	Sweden	92	95	99	286	99	96	90	285	571	
13	Andrei Vasilyeu	Belarus	95	97	97	287	93	96	94	282	569	
14	Oleg Moldovan	Moldova	96	98	96	290	90	97	91	278	568	
15	Miroslav Januš	Czech Republic	95	97	91	283	95	96	90	281	564	
16	Andrey Gurov	Kazakhstan	94	95	94	283	94	94	91	279	562	
17	Tomáš Caknakis	Czech Republic	88	96	100	284	90	92	94	276	560	
18	Koby Holland	United States	97	93	91	281	86	93	91	270	551	
19	Bryan Wilson	Australia	93	87	95	275	92	86	91	269	544	

== Final ==
Rank	Athlete	Qual	Final	Total
1st place, gold medalist(s)	Manfred Kurzer (GER)	590	92.4	682.4
2nd place, silver medalist(s)	Aleksandr Blinov (RUS)	578	100.0	678.0
3rd place, bronze medalist(s)	Dimitri Lykin (RUS)	584	93.1	677.1
4	Emil Martinsson (SWE)	578	98.8	676.8
5	Michael Jakosits (GER)	578	98.7	676.7
6	Li Jie (CHN)	579	96.8	675.8
