= 2002 European 10 m Events Championships =

- Host city: Thessaloniki, Greece
- Level: Senior
- Events: 4 men + 4 women

2002 European 10 m Events Championships were held in Thessaloniki, Greece.

== Men's events ==
Event	Gold	Silver	Bronze
Pistol	Mikhail Nestruev (RUS)	Franck Dumoulin (FRA)	Zsolt Karacs (HUN)
Rifle	Péter Sidi (HUN)	Leif Steinar Rolland (NOR)	Rajmond Debevec (SLO)
Running Target	Dimitri Lykin (RUS)	Aleksandr Blinov (RUS)	Jozsef Sike (HUN)
Running Target Mixed	Alexandr Blinov (RUS)	Dimitri Lykin (RUS)	Miroslav Janus (CZE)

== Women's events ==
Event	Gold	Silver	Bronze
Pistol	Susanne Meyerhoff (DEN)	Mirela Skoko-Celic (CRO)	Olga Kousnetsova (RUS)
Rifle	Sonja Pfeilschifter (GER)	Gaby Buehlmann (SUI)	Lioubov Galkina (RUS)
Running Target	Halyna Avramenko (UKR)	Hanna Neustroyeva (UKR)	Audrey Corenflos (FRA)
Running Target Mixed	Audrey Corenflos (FRA)	Halyna Avramenko (UKR)	Hanna Neustroyeva (UKR)

== Medal table ==
Rank	Nation	Gold	Silver	Bronze	Total
1	Russia (RUS)	3	2	2	7
2	Ukraine (UKR)	1	2	1	4
3	France (FRA)	1	1	1	3
4	Hungary (HUN)	1	0	2	3
5	Denmark (DEN)	1	0	0	1
5	Germany (GER)	1	0	0	1
7	Croatia (CRO)	0	1	0	1
7	Norway (NOR)	0	1	0	1
7	Switzerland (SUI)	0	1	0	1
10	Czech Republic (CZE)	0	0	1	1
10	Slovenia (SLO)	0	0	1	1
Totals (11 entries)		8	8	8	24

== See also ==
- European Shooting Confederation
- International Shooting Sport Federation
- List of medalists at the European Shooting Championships
- List of medalists at the European Shotgun Championships
