= 1973 European Running Target Championships =

- Host city: Munich, West Germany
- Level: Senior
- Events: 2 men (1 individual + 1 team)

The 1973 European Running Target Championships was the 3rd edition of the running target competition, European Running Target Championships, organised by the International Shooting Sport Federation.

== Results ==
=== Men ===
Event	Gold		Silver		Bronze	
Event	Athletes	Pts	Athletes	Pts	Athletes	Pts
50 m running target	(Soviet Union) Yakiv Zheleznyak	573	(Soviet Union) Valery Postoyanov	568	(Hungary) Gyula Szabó	567
50 m running target, team	Soviet Union; Yakiv Zheleznyak; Valery Postoyanov; Aleksandr Kedyarov; Aleksandr Gazov		Sweden; Karlsson.........		Italy............	

== Medal table ==
#	Country	1st place, gold medalist(s)	2nd place, silver medalist(s)	3rd place, bronze medalist(s)	Tot.
1	Soviet Union	2	1	0	3
2	Sweden	0	1	0	2
3	Hungary	0	0	1	1
3	Italy	0	0	1	1
Total		2	2	2	6

== See also ==
- European Shooting Confederation
- International Shooting Sport Federation
- List of medalists at the European Shooting Championships
- List of medalists at the European Shotgun Championships
