= Srećko Pejović =

Serbian sport shooter

Medal record

Men's Shooting

Representing Yugoslavia

European Championships
Silver medal – second place	1978 Copenhagen	AR40M

Srećko Pejović (Serbian Cyrillic: Срећко Пејовић; born 5 July 1953), is a Serbian sport shooter who competed for Yugoslavia at the 1976, 1980 and 1988 Olympic Games. He achieved the best result in 1976 when he finished fourth in 50 m Rifle - Three positions.
