= 2003 European 10 m Events Championships =

- Host city: Gothenburg, Sweden
- Level: Senior
- Events: 4 men + 4 women

2003 European 10 m Events Championships were held in Gothenburg, Sweden.[1]

== Men's events ==
Event	Gold	Silver	Bronze
Pistol	Mikhail Nestruev (RUS)	Yuriy Dauhapolau (BLR)	Victor Makarov (UKR)
Rifle	Jozef Gonci (SVK)	Konstantin Prikhodtchenko (RUS)	Rajmond Debevec (SLO)
Running Target	Andrei Vasilyeu (BLR)	Aleksandr Blinov (RUS)	Miroslav Janus (CZE)
Running Target Mixed	Krister Holmberg (FIN)	Dimitri Lykin (RUS)	Lubomir Pelach (SVK)

== Women's events ==
Event	Gold	Silver	Bronze
Pistol	Susanne Meyerhoff (DEN)	Olena Kostevych (UKR)	Natalia Paderina (RUS)
Rifle	Lioubov Galkina (RUS)	Hanna Etula (FIN)	Dorothee Arbogast (GER)
Running Target	Aleksandra Edel (POL)	Julia Eydenzon (RUS)	Halyna Avramenko (UKR)
Running Target Mixed	Audrey Corenflos (FRA)	Halyna Avramenko (UKR)	Hanna Neustroyeva (UKR)

== Medal table ==
Rank	Nation	Gold	Silver	Bronze	Total
1	Russia (RUS)	2	4	1	7
2	Belarus (BLR)	1	1	0	2
2	Finland (FIN)	1	1	0	2
4	Slovakia (SVK)	1	0	1	2
5	Denmark (DEN)	1	0	0	1
5	France (FRA)	1	0	0	1
5	Poland (POL)	1	0	0	1
8	Ukraine (UKR)	0	2	3	5
9	Czech Republic (CZE)	0	0	1	1
9	Germany (GER)	0	0	1	1
9	Slovenia (SLO)	0	0	1	1
Totals (11 entries)		8	8	8	24

== See also ==
- European Shooting Confederation
- International Shooting Sport Federation
- List of medalists at the European Shooting Championships
- List of medalists at the European Shotgun Championships
