= Geng Hongbin =

Chinese sport shooter

Geng Hongbin (simplified Chinese: 耿鸿滨; traditional Chinese: 耿鴻濱; pinyin: Gěng Hóngbīn; born February 15, 1982, in Jingdezhen, Jiangxi) is a Chinese sports shooter who competed in the 2004 Summer Olympics. During the games he finished eleventh in the men's 10 metre running target competition.
