= 2016 European 10 m Events Championships =

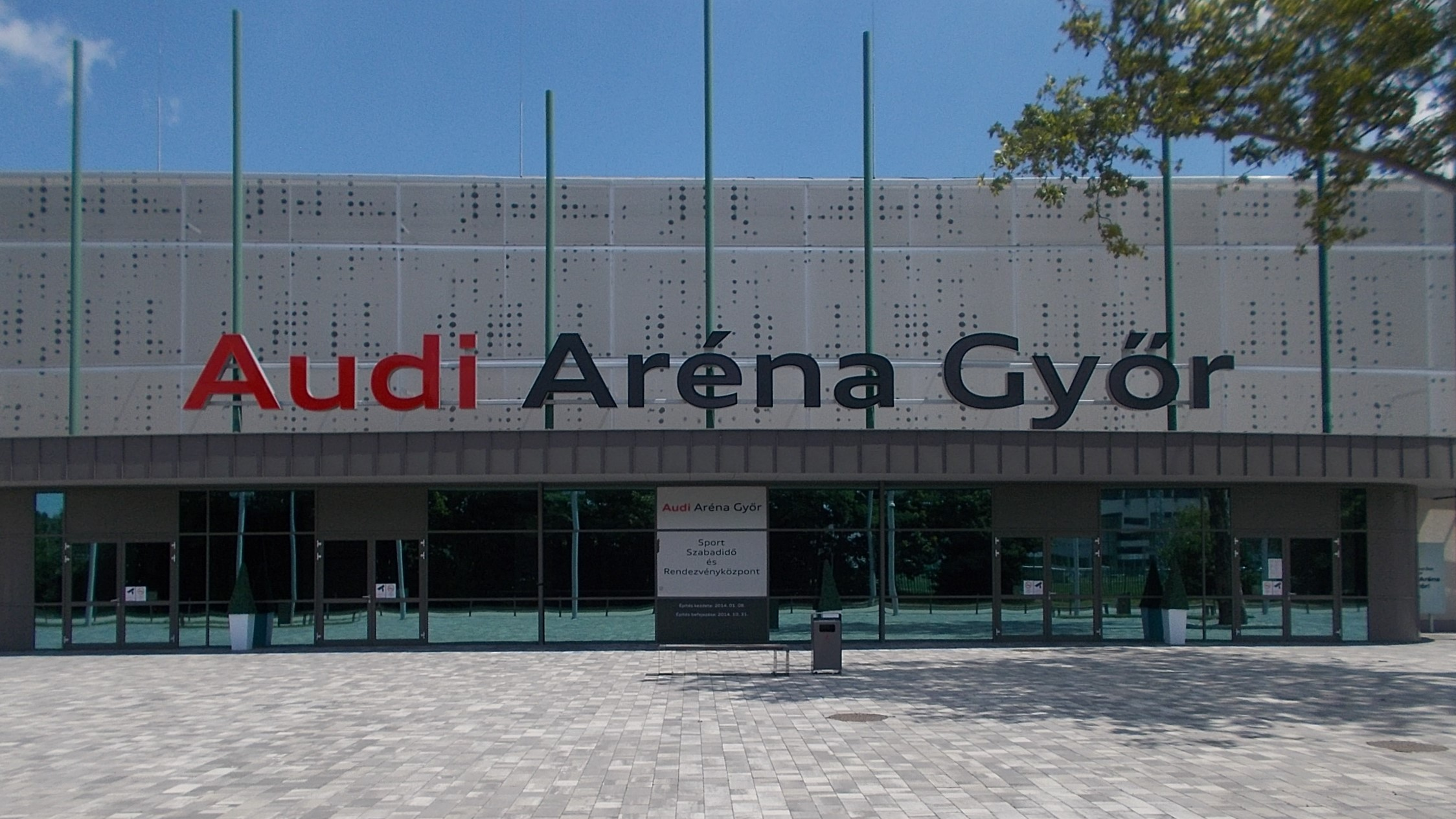
- The Stadium.
- Dates: 22 - 28 February
- Host city: Győr, Hungary
- Venue: Audi Aréna
- Level: Senior
- Events: 4 men + 4 women

The 2016 European 10 m Events Championships were held in Audi Aréna, Győr, Hungary from February 22 to 28, 2016.

== Men's events ==
Event	Gold	Silver	Bronze
Pistol	Yusuf Dikec (TUR)	Pablo Carrera (ESP)	Pavlo Korostylov (UKR)
Pistol TEAM	Russia	Ukraine	Serbia
Running Target	Dmitry Romanov (RUS)	Lukasz Czapla (POL)	Jesper Nyberg (SWE)
Running Target TEAM	Russia	Hungary	Czech Republic
Running Target Mixed	Maxim Stepanov (RUS)	Jozsef Sike (HUN)	Krister Holmberg (FIN)
Running Target Mixed TEAM	Russia	Finland	Hungary
Rifle	Sergey Kamenskiy (RUS)	Illia Charheika (BLR)	Petar Gorsa (CRO)
Rifle TEAM	Russia	Belarus	Austria

== Women's events ==
Event	Gold	Silver	Bronze
Pistol	Olena Kostevych (UKR)	Antoaneta Boneva (BUL)	Zorana Arunovic (SRB)
Pistol TEAM	Russia	Serbia	Hungary
Running Target	Viktoriya Rybovalova (UKR)	Galina Avramenko (UKR)	Olga Stepanova (RUS)
Running Target TEAM	Ukraine	Russia	Germany
Running Target Mixed	Olga Stepanova (RUS)	Galina Avramenko (UKR)	Viktoriya Rybovalova (UKR)
Running Target Mixed TEAM	Ukraine	Russia	Germany
Rifle	Andrea Arsovic (SRB)	Malin Westerheim (NOR)	Petra Lustenberger (SUI)
Rifle TEAM	Hungary	Russia	Germany

== Mixed events ==
Event	Gold	Silver	Bronze
Pistol	Zorana Arunovic; Damir Mikec (SRB)	Oleh Omelchuk; Olena Kostevych (UKR)	Jindrich Dubovy; Silvie Ziskalova (CZE)
Rifle	Andrea Arsovic; Milutin Stefanovic (SRB)	Daria Vdovina; Vladimir Maslennikov (RUS)	Petar Gorsa; Snjezana Pejcic (CRO)

== Men's Junior events ==
Event	Gold	Silver	Bronze
Pistol	Artem Chernousov (RUS)	Gvido Cvetkovs (LAT)	Anton Zanin (RUS)
Pistol TEAM	Russia	Ukraine	Germany
Running Target	Ihor Kizyma (UKR)	Maksym Babushok (UKR)	Iaroslav Klepikov (RUS)
Running Target TEAM	Ukraine	Russia	Armenia
Running Target Mixed	Espen Teppdalen Nordsveen (NOR)	Ihor Kizyma (UKR)	Iaroslav Klepikov (RUS)
Running Target Mixed TEAM	Ukraine	Russia	Armenia
Rifle	Maximilian Dallinger (GER)	Istvan Peni (HUN)	Kyryll Koziuk (UKR)
Rifle TEAM	Hungary	Germany	Ukraine

== Women's Junior events ==
Event	Gold	Silver	Bronze
Pistol	Mathilde Lamolle (FRA)	Nino Khutsiberidze (GEO)	Denisa Bezdecna (FRA)
Pistol TEAM	Russia	France	Germany
Running Target	Yuliya Tymoshko (UKR)	Florence Louis (FRA)	Veronika Major (HUN)
Running Target TEAM	Russia	Ukraine	Hungary
Running Target Mixed	Veronika Major (HUN)	Lilit Mkrtchyan (ARM)	Yuliya Tymoshko (UKR)
Running Target Mixed TEAM	Ukraine	Russia	Hungary
Rifle	Anastasiia Galashina (RUS)	Sarah Hornung (SUI)	Johanna Theresa Tripp (GER)
Rifle TEAM	Serbia	Russia	Germany

== Mixed Junior events ==
Event	Gold	Silver	Bronze
Pistol	Veronika Major; Vilmos Agardy (HUN)	Agata Nowak; Patryk Sakowski (POL)	Margarita Lomova; Artem Chernousov (RUS)
Rifle	Viktoria Hurai; Istvan Peni (HUN)	Sarah Hornung; Christoph Duerr (SUI)	Tal Engler; Ofek Engel (ISR)

== Medal table ==
Rank	Nation	Gold	Silver	Bronze	Total
1	Russia (RUS)	14	8	5	27
2	Ukraine (UKR)	9	8	5	22
3	Hungary (HUN)	5	3	5	13
4	Serbia (SRB)	4	1	2	7
5	France (FRA)	1	2	1	4
6	Germany (GER)	1	1	7	9
7	Norway (NOR)	1	1	0	2
8	Turkey (TUR)	1	0	0	1
9	Switzerland (SUI)	0	2	1	3
10	Belarus (BLR)	0	2	0	2
10	Poland (POL)	0	2	0	2
12	Armenia (ARM)	0	1	2	3
13	Finland (FIN)	0	1	1	2
14	Bulgaria (BUL)	0	1	0	1
14	Georgia (GEO)	0	1	0	1
14	Latvia (LAT)	0	1	0	1
14	Spain (ESP)	0	1	0	1
18	Croatia (CRO)	0	0	2	2
18	Czech Republic (CZE)	0	0	2	2
20	Austria (AUT)	0	0	1	1
20	Israel (ISR)	0	0	1	1
20	Sweden (SWE)	0	0	1	1
Totals (22 entries)		36	36	36	108

== See also ==
- European Shooting Confederation
- International Shooting Sport Federation
- List of medalists at the European Shooting Championships
- List of medalists at the European Shotgun Championships
