= Chernihiv Polytechnic National University =

Public university in Chernihiv, Ukraine

- Established: 1960
- Affiliations: Ministry of Education and Science of Ukraine
- Location: Chernihiv, Ukraine; 51°30′18″N 31°20′6″E
- Website: stu.cn.ua

University rankings

Regional – Overall
- QS Emerging Europe and Central Asia: 401-450 (2022)

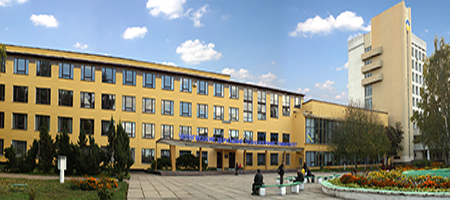
Chernihiv Polytechnic National University

The Chernihiv Polytechnic National University (Ukrainian: Національний університет «Чернігівська політехніка», romanized: Natsionalnyi universytet "Chernihivska politekhnika") is a state-sponsored higher educational institution in Chernihiv, Ukraine, of IV level of accreditation, founded in 1960.

== History ==
The activities of CPNU began in 1960 as the general technical faculty of the Kyiv Polytechnic Institute in accordance with the order of the Ministry of the Supreme Soviet of the Ukrainian SSR dated March 11, 1960.

The first lectures began on September 1, 1960. The initial admission was 175 students. The number of instructor was 20. The dean of the faculty was Kalita Evgeny Grigoryevich.

The first admission to full-time education in three specialties was carried out in the 1962-1963 academic year and amounted to 150 students.

On September 1, 1965, according to the order of the Ministry of Higher and Secondary Special Education of the USSR, the Chernihiv branch of the Kiev Polytechnic Institute was organized, consisting of three faculties: mechanical, technological and general technical. The dean of the general technical faculty Evgeny Kalita was appointed the director of the branch.

The number of students in the 1966–1967 academic year was 1,100. In 1991, the Chernihiv Technological Institute was established by the resolution of the Cabinet of Ministers of Ukraine № 193 of September 10, 1991 asf the Chernihiv branch of the KPI. The rector of the institute was appointed doctor of technical sciences, professor Denisov Alexander Ivanovich. The plan of admission to the institute was 490 people, and 1,919 people for the 1991–1992 academic year.

In 1994, the Faculty of Engineering and Economics was established. In 1994, the university was licensed and accredited, as a result of which it received the IV level of accreditation.

By the resolution of the Cabinet of Ministers of Ukraine № 1372 of July 29, 1999, the Chernihiv State Technological University was established on the basis of the Chernihiv Institute of Technology.

In 2011, the Chernihiv State Institute of Law, Social Technologies and Labor joined the university, which in 2014 became known as the Educational and Scientific Institute of Law and Social Technologies.

In 2013, the university received the title of national and has since been called Chernihiv National University of Technology.

In 2014, the Chernihiv State Institute of Economics and Management joined the university, which became known as the Educational and Scientific Institute of Economics.

On December 10, 2019, the university was renamed into the National University "Chernihiv Polytechnic".

The university was shelled and damaged by Russian shelling on 14 March 2022 according to Vyacheslav Chaus, the governor of Chernihiv Oblast during the Siege of Chernihiv during the 2022 Russian invasion of Ukraine.

== Notable alumni ==
- Olena Kostevych
- Mykola Synytsya
