= European Running Target Championships =

The European Running Target Championships are special shooting sport championships of running target organized discontinuously by the International Shooting Sport Federation (ISSF) since 1963.

Until 1983 competitions were held by shooting to moving targets made up of animals, such as deer, roebucks or wild boars; since 1983, the animals have been replaced with artificial targets.

== Editions ==
- 6 Edition (1978, 1995, 1997, 2013, 2014, 2018) of shotgun and running target was held simultaneously.

#	Year	City	Date	Events
1	1963	Sandviken, Sweden		Running target (3 men)
2	1969	Sandviken, Sweden		Running target (1 men)
3	1973	Munich, West Germany		Running target (1 men)
4	1978	Suhl, East Germany		Running target (1 men)
5	1981	Miskolc, Hungary		Running target (1 men)
6	1995	Lahti, Finland		Running target (2 men)
7	1997	Sipoo, Finland		Running target (2 men)
8	2013	Suhl, Germany		Running target (2 men)
9	2019	Gyenesdiás, Hungary	10–14 July	
10	2020	Wrocław, Poland	25 Feb.–1 Mar.	
11	2024	Plzeň, Czech Republic	28 Aug.–3 Sep.	

=== Special Running Target Championships ===
- 6 Edition (1978, 1995, 1997, 2013, 2014, 2018) of shotgun and running target was held simultaneously.

Number	Year	City	Country	Events	Notes
1	1963	Sandviken	Sweden	3	
2	1969	Sandviken	Sweden	1	
3	1973	Munich	West Germany	1	
4	1975	Munich	West Germany	1	
5	1978	Suhl	East Germany	1	
6	1981	Miskolc	Hungary	1	
7	1992	Keszthely	Hungary	2	
8	1995	Lahti	Finland	2	
9	1996	Brno	Czech Republic	2	
10	1997	Sipoo	Finland	2	
11	1998	Keszthely	Hungary	2	
12	2013	Suhl	Germany	2	
13	2014	Sarlóspuszta	Hungary	2	

== See also ==
- Running target shooting
- International Shooting Sport Federation
- ISSF European Shooting Championships
