= 2001 European 10 m Events Championships =

- Host city: Pontevedra, Spain
- Level: Senior
- Events: 4 men + 4 women

The 2001 European 10 m Events Championships were held in Pontevedra, Spain.

== Men's events ==
| Event | Gold | Silver | Bronze |
|---|---|---|---|
| Pistol | Roberto Di Donna (ITA) | Igor Basinski (BLR) | Martin Tenk (CZE) |
| Rifle | Dick Boschman (NED) | Péter Sidi (HUN) | Evgeniy Aleinikov (RUS) |
| Running Target | Marten Kurzer (GER) | Jozsef Sike (HUN) | Emil Martinsson (SWE) |
| Running Target Mixed | Marten Kurzer (GER) | Jozsef Sike (HUN) | Miroslav Janus (CZE) |

== Women's events ==
| Event | Gold | Silver | Bronze |
|---|---|---|---|
| Pistol | Natalia Paderina (RUS) | Olga Kousnetsova (RUS) | Nino Salukvadze (GEO) |
| Rifle | Sonja Pfeilschifter (GER) | Valerie Mennezein (FRA) | Lioubov Galkina (RUS) |
| Running Target | Audrey Corenflos (FRA) | Irina Izmalkova (RUS) | Volha Markava (BLR) |
| Running Target Mixed | Audrey Corenflos (FRA) | Anastasiya Shytsikava (BLR) | Volha Markava (BLR) |

== Medal table ==
| Rank | Nation | Gold | Silver | Bronze | Total |
|---|---|---|---|---|---|
| 1 | Germany (GER) | 3 | 0 | 0 | 3 |
| 2 | France (FRA) | 2 | 1 | 0 | 3 |
| 3 | Russia (RUS) | 1 | 2 | 2 | 5 |
| 4 | Italy (ITA) | 1 | 0 | 0 | 1 |
| 4 | Netherlands (NED) | 1 | 0 | 0 | 1 |
| 6 | Hungary (HUN) | 0 | 3 | 0 | 3 |
| 7 | Belarus (BLR) | 0 | 2 | 2 | 4 |
| 8 | Czech Republic (CZE) | 0 | 0 | 2 | 2 |
| 9 | Georgia (GEO) | 0 | 0 | 1 | 1 |
| 9 | Sweden (SWE) | 0 | 0 | 1 | 1 |
| Totals (10 entries) | | 8 | 8 | 8 | 24 |

== See also ==
- European Shooting Confederation
- International Shooting Sport Federation
- List of medalists at the European Shooting Championships
- List of medalists at the European Shotgun Championships
