= 2004 European 10 m Events Championships =

- Dates: 22 – 28 March
- Host city: Győr, Hungary
- Level: Senior
- Events: 4 men + 4 women

The 2004 European 10 m Events Championships were held in Győr, Hungary.

== Men's events ==
Event	Gold	Silver	Bronze
Pistol	Mikhail Nestruev (RUS)	Tanyu Kiriakov (BUL)	Francesco Bruno (ITA)
Rifle	Péter Sidi (HUN)	Dick Boschman (NED)	Alin George Moldoveanu (ROU)
Running Target	Jozsef Sike (HUN)	Aleksandr Blinov (RUS)	Michael Jakosits (GER)
Running Target Mixed	Michael Jakosits (GER)	Emil Martinsson (SWE)	Niklas Bergstroem (SWE)

== Women's events ==
Event	Gold	Silver	Bronze
Pistol	Natalia Paderina (RUS)	Olena Kostevych (UKR)	Susanne Meyerhoff (DEN)
Rifle	Katerina Emmons (CZE)	Sonja Pfeilschifter (GER)	Monika Haselsberger (AUT)
Running Target	Halyna Avramenko (UKR)	Hanna Neustroyeva (UKR)	Audrey Corenflos (FRA)
Running Target Mixed	Hanna Neustroyeva (UKR)	Halyna Avramenko (UKR)	Audrey Corenflos (FRA)

== Medal table ==
Rank	Nation	Gold	Silver	Bronze	Total
1	Ukraine (UKR)	2	3	0	5
2	Russia (RUS)	2	1	0	3
3	Hungary (HUN)	2	0	0	2
4	Germany (GER)	1	1	1	3
5	Czech Republic (CZE)	1	0	0	1
6	Sweden (SWE)	0	1	1	2
7	Bulgaria (BUL)	0	1	0	1
7	Netherlands (NED)	0	1	0	1
9	France (FRA)	0	0	2	2
10	Austria (AUT)	0	0	1	1
10	Denmark (DEN)	0	0	1	1
10	Italy (ITA)	0	0	1	1
10	Romania (ROU)	0	0	1	1
Totals (13 entries)		8	8	8	24

== See also ==
- European Shooting Confederation
- International Shooting Sport Federation
- List of medalists at the European Shooting Championships
- List of medalists at the European Shotgun Championships
