= 2009 European 10 m Events Championships =

- Dates: 19–23 February
- Host city: Prague, Czech Republic
- Venue: Arena O2
- Level: Senior
- Events: 4 men + 4 women

The 2009 European 10 m Events Championships was held in Prague, Czech Republic, from 19 to 22 February 2009.

Competitions were contested at the Arena O2.

== Results ==
=== Men ===
Event	Gold	Silver	Bronze
Rifle	Niccolò Campriani (ITA)	Pierre-Edmond Piasecki (FRA)	Vitali Bubnovich (BLR)
Rifle (teams)	Italy	Russia	Austria
Pistol	Andrija Zlatić (SRB)	Mauro Badaracchi (ITA)	Vladimir Isakov (RUS)
Pistol (teams)	Slovakia	Serbia	Ukraine
Running target	Niklas Bergström (SWE)	Maxim Stepanov (RUS)	Alexandr Blinov (RUS)
Running target (teams)	Russia	Ukraine	Czech Republic
Running target mixed	Aleksandr Blinov (RUS)	Maxim Stepanov (RUS)	Jószef Sike (HUN)
Running target mixed (teams)	Russia	Slovakia	Czech Republic

=== Women ===
Event	Gold	Silver	Bronze
Rifle	Snježana Pejčić (CRO)	Beate Gauss (GER)	Pavla Kalna (CZE)
Rifle (teams)	Norway	Croatia	Germany
Pistol	Maria Grozdeva (BUL)	Nino Salukvadze (GEO)	Lenka Marušková (CZE)
Pistol (teams)	Belarus	Russia	Ukraine
Running target	Halyna Avramenko (UKR)	Viktoria Zablotina (UKR)	Marina Gulak (RUS)
Running target (teams)	Not awarded		
Running target mixed	Silke Abramovic (GER)	Viktoria Zabolotna (UKR)	Halyna Avramenko (UKR)
Running target mixed (teams)	Not awarded		

== Medal table ==
Rank	Nation	Gold	Silver	Bronze	Total
1	Russia (RUS)	3	4	3	10
2	Italy (ITA)	2	1	0	3
3	Ukraine (UKR)	1	3	3	7
4	Germany (GER)	1	1	1	3
5	Croatia (CRO)	1	1	0	2
5	Serbia (SRB)	1	1	0	2
5	Slovakia (SVK)	1	1	0	2
8	Belarus (BLR)	1	0	1	2
9	Bulgaria (BUL)	1	0	0	1
9	Norway (NOR)	1	0	0	1
9	Sweden (SWE)	1	0	0	1
12	France (FRA)	0	1	0	1
12	Georgia (GEO)	0	1	0	1
14	Czech Republic (CZE)	0	0	4	4
15	Austria (AUT)	0	0	1	1
15	Hungary (HUN)	0	0	1	1
Totals (16 entries)		14	14	14	42

== See also ==
- European Shooting Confederation
- International Shooting Sport Federation
- List of medalists at the European Shooting Championships
- List of medalists at the European Shotgun Championships
