= Illia Charheika =

Belarusian sports shooter

Personal information
- Nationality: Belarusian
- Born: 15 April 1993 (age 33) Minsk, Belarus
- Height: 1.78 m (5 ft 10 in)
- Weight: 77 kg (170 lb)

Sport
- Country: Belarus
- Sport: Sports shooting
- Event: Air rifle
- Club: Dinamo
Medal record
Men's shooting
Representing Belarus
World Championships
Bronze medal – third place	2018 Changwon	50 m team rifle 3 positions
European Shooting Championships
Bronze medal – third place	Osijek 2013	50 m rifle 3P team

Illia Charheika (Belarusian: Ілья Чаргейка; born 15 April 1993) is a Belarusian sports shooter. He competed in the Men's 10 metre air rifle event at the 2012 Summer Olympics.
