= Niu Zhiyuan =

Chinese sports shooter (born 1973)

Olympic medal record

Men's shooting

Representing China
Bronze medal – third place	2000 Sydney	10 m running target

Niu Zhiyuan (born 13 December 1973) is a Chinese sport shooter who competed in the 2000 Summer Olympics.

Current world records held in 10 metre running target mixed
Men	Teams	1158	Russia (Blinov, Ermolenko, Lykin); China (Gan, Niu, Yang)	March 22, 2002; July 31, 2006	Thessaloniki (GRE); Zagreb (CRO)
