= Yang Ling =

Chinese sport shooter (born 1968)

Medal record

Men's shooting

Representing China
Gold medal – first place	1996 Atlanta	10 m running target
Gold medal – first place	2000 Sydney	10 m running target

Yang Ling (simplified Chinese: 杨凌; traditional Chinese: 楊淩; pinyin: Yáng Líng, born May 24, 1968, in Beijing) is a male Chinese sports shooter. He won both the 1996 Summer Olympics and the 2000 Olympic Games in 10 metre running target, being the only shooter to successfully defend an Olympic title in that event.

== Olympic results ==
Event	1996	2000
10 metre running target	(gold) Gold; 585+100.8	(gold) Gold; 581+100.1

== Other major performances ==
- 1994 National Champions Tournament - 1st 10m moving target 30+30
- 1994 National Qualification Tournament - 1st team, 2nd 10m moving target 30+30
- 1994 National Moving Target Championships - 1st 10m moving target mixed speed & 2nd 10m moving target standard speed
- 1996 World Championships - 1st 50m moving target team & 2nd 25m standard pistol 60 shots team

== Records ==
Current world records held in 10 metre running target mixed
Men	Teams	1158	Russia (Blinov, Ermolenko, Lykin); China (Gan, Niu, Yang)	March 22, 2002; July 31, 2006	Thessaloniki (GRE); Zagreb (CRO)
