= Dimitri Lykin =

Russian sport shooter

Personal information
- Born: March 13, 1974 (age 52)
Medal record
Men's shooting
Representing Russia
Olympic Games
Bronze medal – third place	2004 Athens	10 m running target
World Championships
Gold medal – first place	2002 Lahti	10 m running target

Dimitri Valeryevich Lykin (Russian: Дмитрий Валерьевич Лыкин, born March 13, 1974) is a Russian sport shooter, specializing in the running targets event. He won the bronze medal at the 2004 Olympic Games in the 10 m Running Target event. He also competed at 1996 and 2000 Olympic Games.

== Olympic results ==
Event	1996	2000	2004
10 metre running target	5th 581+95.7	5th 573+98.7	(bronze) Bronze; 584+93.1

== Records ==
Current world records in 10 metre running target mixed
Men	Teams	1158	Russia (Blinov, Ermolenko, Lykin); China (Gan, Niu, Yang)	March 22, 2002; July 31, 2006	Thessaloniki (GRE); Zagreb (CRO)
