= Walter Lapeyre =

French sport shooter

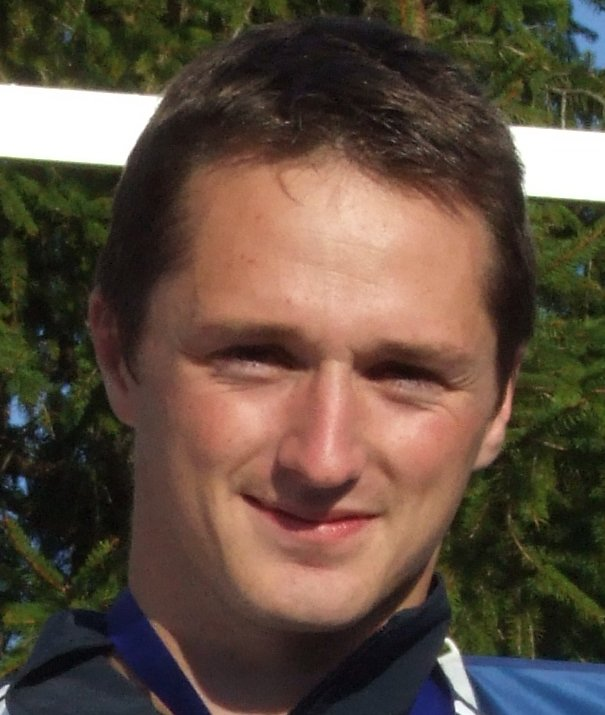

Walter Lapeyre (born 9 February 1976) is a pistol shooter from Bordeaux, France.

== Palmares ==
=== Olympic Games ===
Event	2008	2012
50 m Pistol	24th 552	21st 554
10 m Air Pistol	6th 581+99.3	22nd 575

=== World Cups ===
- (gold) ISSF World Cup Bangkok 2007 : Gold Medal in 10 m Air Pistol
- (bronze) ISSF World Cup Sydney 2007 : Bronze Medal in 10 m Air Pistol
- (bronze) ISSF World Cup Brazil 2006 : Bronze Medal in 10 m Air Pistol

=== European Championships ===
- European Championships 2008 (Winterthur, Switzerland) :
  - Silver Medal in 10 m Air Pistol
- European Championships 2007 (Deauville, France) :
  - Silver Team Medal in 10 m Air Pistol
- European Championships 2006 (Moscow, Russia) :
  - Bronze Medal
  - Gold Team Medal in 10 m Air Pistol (Walter Lapeyre, Franck Dumoulin, Manuel Alexandre-Augrand)
- European Championships 2005 (Tallinn, Estonia) :
  - Gold Medal in 10 m Air Pistol

=== France Championships ===
- France Champion in 50 m Pistol in 1999, 2005, 2006, 2007, 2008 and 2011
- France Champion in 10 m Air Pistol in 2005, 2008, 2011 and 2012

=== Personal bests ===
- 10 m Air Pistol : 590/600
- 50 m Pistol : 571/600
