= Sergei Kruglov (sport shooter) =

Russian sport shooter (born 1985)

Personal information
- Full name: Sergey Andreyevich Kruglov
- Nationality: Russia
- Born: 27 March 1985 (age 41) Khabarovsk, Russian SFSR
- Height: 1.75 m (5 ft 9 in)
- Weight: 72 kg (159 lb)

Sport
- Sport: Shooting
- Event(s): 10 m air rifle (AR40); 50 m rifle prone (FR60PR); 50 m rifle 3 positions (STR3X20)
- Club: CSA Pomoriye
- Coached by: Oleg Seleznev
Medal record
European Games
Bronze medal – third place	2015 Baku	Mixed 10 m air rifle

Sergey Andreyevich Kruglov (also Sergei Kruglov, Russian: Серге́й Андреевич Круглов; born 27 March 1985 in Khabarovsk) is a Russian sport shooter. In 2010, Kruglov had won a gold medal for the 10 m air rifle at the European Shooting Championships in Meråker, Norway, and eventually captured the bronze at the ISSF World Cup in Fort Benning, Georgia, United States. He is also a member of CSA Pomoriye and is coached and trained by Oleg Seleznev.

Kruglov represented Russia at the 2008 Summer Olympics in Beijing, where he competed in the men's 10 m air rifle, along with his teammate Konstantin Prikhodtchenko. He finished only in eighth place by seven tenths of a point (0.7) behind Serbia's Stevan Pletikosić, for a total score of 697 targets (595 in the preliminary rounds and 102 in the final).

In 2013 Sergey started working for the Russian National Team, doubling his efforts as a competitive shooter.
