= Aleksandr Blinov (sport shooter) =

Russian sports shooter (born 1981)

Personal information
- Full name: Aleksandr Aleksandrovich Blinov
- Born: August 20, 1981 (age 44) Vladivostok, Russian SFSR, Soviet Union
Medal record
Men's shooting
Representing Russia
Olympic Games
Silver medal – second place	2004 Athens	10 m running target
World Championships
Gold medal – first place	2008 Plzeň	50 m running target mixed
Silver medal – second place	2006 Zagreb	10 m running target

Aleksandr Aleksandrovich Blinov (Russian: Александр Александрович Блинов; born August 20, 1981) is a Russian sport shooter, specializing in the 10 metre running target event. He won the silver medal at the 2004 Olympic Games in the 10 m Running Target event.

Olympic results
Event	2004
10 metre running target	(silver) Silver; 578+100.0

== Records ==
Current world records in 10 metre running target mixed
Men	Teams	1158	Russia (Blinov, Ermolenko, Lykin); China (Gan, Niu, Yang)	March 22, 2002; July 31, 2006	Thessaloniki (GRE); Zagreb (CRO)
