= Vladislav Prianishnikov =

Russian sports shooter

Vladyslav Prianishnikov
Personal information
- Full name: Vladislav Aleksandrovich; Prianishnikov
- Nationality: Ukrainian (until 2014); Russian
- Born: 16 March 1983 (age 43) Simferopol, Ukrainian SSR, Soviet Union
- Height: 1.92 m (6 ft 4 in)
- Weight: 88 kg (194 lb)

Sport
- Country: Russia
- Sport: Shooting
- Event: 10 m running target (RT)
- Club: Dynamo Simferopol
Medal record
Men's shooting
Representing Russia
World Championships
Gold medal – first place	2018 Changwon	10 RT team
Silver medal – second place	2018 Changwon	10 m team running target mixed
Bronze medal – third place	2018 Changwon	10 RT
European Championships
Gold medal – first place	2018 Győr	RT mixed team
Silver medal – second place	2018 Győr	RT team
Representing Ukraine
World Championships
Silver medal – second place	2009 Vierumäki	RT
Bronze medal – third place	2008 Plzen	RT

Vladislav Aleksandrovich Prianishnikov (Russian: Владислав Александрович Прянишников, born 16 March 1983) is a Ukrainian (until 2014) and Russian sport shooter, who specializes in the running target. He produced a remarkable career tally of twenty-two medals, including eight golds from the European Championships and two (one silver and one bronze) from the 2008 and 2009 World Championships respectively. Prianishnikov was also selected to compete for Ukraine at the 2004 Summer Olympics, where he finished seventh in running target shooting, before his event had been officially removed from the Olympic program. Being a multiple European champion and a two-time Worlds medalist, Prianishnikov has been inducted an Honored Master of Sport and Master of Sport of Ukraine of International Class in shooting for his outstanding achievements in running target.

Prianishnikov qualified for the Ukrainian squad, as a 21-year-old, on his only Olympic debut in the men's 10 m running target at the 2004 Summer Olympics in Athens, by virtue of exchanging a quota place won by his teammate Ivan Rybovalov in the free pistol with his selection, having achieved a minimum qualifying score of 578 from his third-place finish at the ISSF World Cup meet in Bangkok, Thailand. Prianishnikov shot an astonishing score of 293 to open the slow-moving target round in fourth position. He fired 282 to hold off a one-point advantage over three-time U.S. Olympian Adam Saathoff in the fast-moving round, but faded to seventh with a final score of 575, just three points short to reach the finals.
