= Irina Izmalkova =

Russian sport shooter

Personal information
- Nationality: Russian
- Born: 21 June 1970 (age 56) Volgograd, Russia
- Height: 1.66 m (5 ft 5 in)

Sport
- Country: Russia
- Sport: Shooting
- Event: Running target shooting
Medal record
World Championships
Bronze medal – third place	2018 Changwon	10 m running target mixed
Bronze medal – third place	2018 Changwon	10 m team running target
Bronze medal – third place	2018 Changwon	10 m team running target mixed
European Championships
Bronze medal – third place	2019 Gyenesdia	50 m running target mixed
Gold medal – first place	2020 Wroclaw	10 m team running target mixed

Irina Izmalkova (born 21 June 1970) is a Russian sport shooter.

She participated at the 2018 ISSF World Shooting Championships, winning a medal.

In 2019 she won a bronze medal in the 50m Running Target mixed at the European Championships in Gyenesdia.
