= European Shooting Confederation =

European sports shooting governing body

- Sport: Shooting Sports
- Jurisdiction: Europe
- Membership: 57
- Abbreviation: ESC
- Founded: 1969
- Affiliation: ISSF
- Headquarters: Lausanne, Switzerland
- President: Alexander Ratner

Official website
- www.esc-shooting.org

The European Shooting Confederation (ESC) is an association of the International Shooting Sport Federation's member federations from Europe, the Caucasus, Cyprus, Israel, and Turkey.

== History ==
The organisation of European Shooting Championships was first decided in 1952 at the Congress of the International Shooting Union. Successful Championships and regional competitions were organised by the Committee for European Affairs within the International Union. The Confederation was founded as a distinct entity in 1969.

Between 2009 and 2021, Vladimir Lisin served as president. Alexander Ratner was elected president in 2021, taking over from Vladimir Lisin, who had been elected President of the International Shooting Sport Federation in 2018.

Following the 2022 Russian invasion of Ukraine the ESC and ISSF had banned Russian and Belarusian athletes and officials from their competitions. In addition, the ESC stripped Russia of its right to host the 2022 European Shooting Championships in the 25m, 50m, 300m, running target and shotgun.

In March, both ESC President Alexander Ratner and ISSF President Vladimir Lisin were barred from attending the European 10metre Shooting Championships in any official capacity, amid calls for them to step aside. Ratner attended privately, insisting that neither he nor Lisin had links with the Russian government.

In July 2023, the Finnish Shooting Sport Federation (SAL) called for a secret ballot on the ESC Presidency to be added to the agenda of the 2023 ESC General Assembly in October. In particular they complained that Ratner had used ESC platforms to support Vladimir Lisin in the ISSF elections, as well as breaching the neutrality required as salaried staff at the ISSF (Ratner was ISSF Secretary-General at the time). In response, Mr Ratner threatened legal action. SAL appealed the matter to the Court of Arbitration for Sport, which found itself unable to impose provisional measures. No ballot was held at the General Assembly.

== European Championships ==
Last editions contested

Competition	Last edition	Venue	Date	Notes
ISSF European Shooting Championships
European 10 m Events Championships	2026	(Armenia) Yerevan	27 February – 5 March	
European Running Target Championships	2024	(Czech Republic) Plzeň	28 August - 3 September	
European Shotgun Championships	2024	(Italy) Lonato del Garda	17–26 May	
European Shooting Championships	2025	(France) Châteauroux	23 July – 7 August	

== Competitions administered by the ESC ==
- European Championships in all ISSF shooting events except airgun events are held every odd-numbered year in July or August
- Extra European Championships in shotgun events and junior events are held in all other years
- European Championships in 10 metre air rifle, 10 metre air pistol, 10 metre running target and 10 metre running target mixed are held every year at the end of the indoor season, typically in March
- The European Cup 300 m (currently Lapua European Cup 300 m) in the non-Olympic 300 metre rifle three positions, 300 metre rifle prone and 300 metre standard rifle with a similar season structure to the ISSF World Cup in Olympic events
- The European Cup 25 m (currently Walther European Cup 25 m) in the non-Olympic 25 metre center-fire pistol and 25 metre standard pistol
- The European Shotgun Tournament
- The ESC Youth League for national teams in 10 metre air rifle and 10 metre air pistol, in preparation for the Youth Olympic Games, premiering in 2009
