= Shooting at the 2014 Asian Games =

- Venue: Ongnyeon International Shooting Range; Gyeonggido Shooting Range
- Dates: 20–30 September 2014
- Competitors: 543 from 34 nations

Shooting at the 2014 Asian Games was held in Pistol/Rifle at Ongnyeon International Shooting Range & Shotgun and Gyeonggido Shooting Range in Incheon, South Korea between 20 and 30 September 2014.

== Schedule ==
●	1st day	●	Final day	Q	Qualification	F	Final

Event↓/Date →	20th Sat		21st Sun		22nd Mon		23rd Tue		24th Wed		25th Thu		26th Fri		27th Sat		28th Sun	29th Mon	30th Tue	
Men's 10 m air pistol			Q	F																
Men's 10 m air pistol team			●																	
Men's 25 m center fire pistol													●							
Men's 25 m center fire pistol team													●							
Men's 25 m rapid fire pistol							Q		Q	F										
Men's 25 m rapid fire pistol team							●		●											
Men's 25 m standard pistol											●									
Men's 25 m standard pistol team											●									
Men's 50 m pistol	Q	F																		
Men's 50 m pistol team	●																			
Men's 10 m air rifle							Q	F												
Men's 10 m air rifle team							●													
Men's 50 m rifle prone											Q	F								
Men's 50 m rifle prone team											●									
Men's 50 m rifle 3 positions															Q	F				
Men's 50 m rifle 3 positions team															●					
Men's 10 m running target											Q	F								
Men's 10 m running target team											●									
Men's 10 m running target mixed															●					
Men's 10 m running target mixed team															●					
Men's trap	Q		Q	F																
Men's trap team	●		●																	
Men's double trap											Q	F								
Men's double trap team											●									
Men's skeet																		Q	Q	F
Men's skeet team																		●	●	
Women's 10 m air pistol	Q	F																		
Women's 10 m air pistol team	●																			
Women's 25 m pistol					Q	F														
Women's 25 m pistol team					●															
Women's 10 m air rifle					Q	F														
Women's 10 m air rifle team					●															
Women's 50 m rifle prone									●											
Women's 50 m rifle prone team									●											
Women's 50 m rifle 3 positions													Q	F						
Women's 50 m rifle 3 positions team													●							
Women's 10 m running target													Q	F						
Women's 10 m running target team													●							
Women's trap							Q	F												
Women's trap team							●													
Women's double trap											●									
Women's double trap team											●									
Women's skeet															Q	F				
Women's skeet team															●					

== Medalists ==
=== Men ===
Event	Gold	Silver	Bronze
10 m air pistol	Kim Cheong-yong; South Korea	Pang Wei; China	Jin Jong-oh; South Korea
10 m air pistol team	South Korea; Jin Jong-oh; Kim Cheong-yong; Lee Dae-myung	China; Pang Wei; Pu Qifeng; Wang Zhiwei	India; Samaresh Jung; Prakash Nanjappa; Jitu Rai
25 m center fire pistol	Oleg Engachev; Qatar	Jin Yongde; China	Gai Bin; Singapore
25 m center fire pistol team	China; Ding Feng; Jin Yongde; Li Chuanlin	India; Vijay Kumar; Gurpreet Singh; Pemba Tamang	South Korea; Jang Dae-kyu; Kim Jin-il; Kim Young-min
25 m rapid fire pistol	Kim Jun-hong; South Korea	Zhang Jian; China	Hu Haozhe; China
25 m rapid fire pistol team	South Korea; Jang Dae-kyu; Kim Jun-hong; Song Jong-ho	China; Hu Haozhe; Li Yuehong; Zhang Jian	Vietnam; Bùi Quang Nam; Hà Minh Thành; Kiều Thanh Tú
25 m standard pistol	Ding Feng; China	Kim Jun-hong; South Korea	Hà Minh Thành; Vietnam
25 m standard pistol team	China; Ding Feng; Jin Yongde; Li Chuanlin	South Korea; Jang Dae-kyu; Kang Min-su; Kim Jun-hong	Singapore; Gai Bin; Lim Swee Hon; Poh Lip Meng
50 m pistol	Jitu Rai; India	Nguyễn Hoàng Phương; Vietnam	Wang Zhiwei; China
50 m pistol team	China; Pang Wei; Pu Qifeng; Wang Zhiwei	South Korea; Choi Young-rae; Jin Jong-oh; Lee Dae-myung	Vietnam; Hoàng Xuân Vinh; Nguyễn Hoàng Phương; Trần Quốc Cường
10 m air rifle	Yang Haoran; China	Cao Yifei; China	Abhinav Bindra; India
10 m air rifle team	China; Cao Yifei; Liu Tianyou; Yang Haoran	South Korea; Han Jin-seop; Kim Hyeon-jun; Kim Sang-do	India; Abhinav Bindra; Ravi Kumar; Sanjeev Rajput
50 m rifle prone	Zhao Shengbo; China	Ezuan Nasir Khan; Malaysia	Park Bong-duk; South Korea
50 m rifle prone team	China; Lan Xing; Liu Gang; Zhao Shengbo	South Korea; Kwon Jun-cheol; Park Bong-duk; You Jae-jin	Kazakhstan; Ratmir Mindiyarov; Igor Pirekeyev; Yuriy Yurkov
50 m rifle 3 positions	Cao Yifei; China	Zhu Qinan; China	Chain Singh; India
50 m rifle 3 positions team	China; Cao Yifei; Kang Hongwei; Zhu Qinan	South Korea; Han Jin-seop; Kim Jong-hyun; Kwon Jun-cheol	Japan; Takayuki Matsumoto; Midori Yajima; Toshikazu Yamashita
10 m running target	Zhai Yujia; China	Jo Yong-chol; North Korea	Bakhtiyar Ibrayev; Kazakhstan
10 m running target team	China; Gan Yu; Zhai Yujia; Zhang Jie	North Korea; Jo Yong-chol; Kim Ji-song; Pak Myong-won	Kazakhstan; Andrey Gurov; Bakhtiyar Ibrayev; Rassim Mologly
10 m running target mixed	Kim Ji-song; North Korea	Zhai Yujia; China	Jeong You-jin; South Korea
10 m running target mixed team	China; Xie Durun; Zhai Yujia; Zhang Jie	North Korea; Jo Yong-chol; Kim Ji-song; Pak Myong-won	Vietnam; Đỗ Đức Hùng; Ngô Hữu Vượng; Trần Hoàng Vũ
Trap	Gao Bo; China	Fehaid Al-Deehani; Kuwait	Andrey Mogilevskiy; Kazakhstan
Trap team	China; Du Yu; Gao Bo; Zhang Yiyao	Kuwait; Fehaid Al-Deehani; Abdulrahman Al-Faihan; Khaled Al-Mudhaf	South Korea; Jung Chang-hee; Lee Young-sik; Shin Hyun-woo
Double trap	Hu Binyuan; China	Fehaid Al-Deehani; Kuwait	Juma Al-Maktoum; United Arab Emirates
Double trap team	Qatar; Masoud Hamad Al-Athba; Rashid Hamad Al-Athba; Hamad Al-Marri	China; Hu Binyuan; Li Jun; Mo Junjie	Kuwait; Ahmad Al-Afasi; Hamad Al-Afasi; Fehaid Al-Deehani
Skeet	Abdullah Al-Rashidi; Kuwait	Xu Ying; China	Jin Di; China
Skeet team	China; Jin Di; Xu Ying; Zhang Fan	Kuwait; Salah Al-Mutairi; Abdullah Al-Rashidi; Saud Habib	South Korea; Cho Min-ki; Hwang Jung-soo; Lee Jong-jun

=== Women ===
Event	Gold	Silver	Bronze
10 m air pistol	Zhang Mengyuan; China	Jung Jee-hae; South Korea	Shweta Chaudhary; India
10 m air pistol team	China; Guo Wenjun; Zhang Mengyuan; Zhou Qingyuan	Chinese Taipei; Tien Chia-chen; Tu Yi Yi-tzu; Wu Chia-ying	Mongolia; Tömörchödöriin Bayartsetseg; Otryadyn Gündegmaa; Tsogbadrakhyn Mönkhzul
25 m pistol	Zhang Jingjing; China	Chen Ying; China	Otryadyn Gündegmaa; Mongolia
25 m pistol team	South Korea; Kim Jang-mi; Kwak Jung-hye; Lee Jung-eun	China; Chen Ying; Zhang Jingjing; Zhou Qingyuan	India; Rahi Sarnobat; Anisa Sayyed; Heena Sidhu
10 m air rifle	Najmeh Khedmati; Iran	Narjes Emamgholinejad; Iran	Zhang Binbin; China
10 m air rifle team	China; Wu Liuxi; Yi Siling; Zhang Binbin	Iran; Elaheh Ahmadi; Narjes Emamgholinejad; Najmeh Khedmati	South Korea; Jeong Mi-ra; Kim Gae-nam; Kim Seol-a
50 m rifle prone	Chuluunbadrakhyn Narantuyaa; Mongolia	Nur Suryani Taibi; Malaysia	Eum Bit-na; South Korea
50 m rifle prone team	South Korea; Eum Bit-na; Jeong Mi-ra; Na Yoon-kyung	China; Chang Jing; Chen Dongqi; Yi Siling	Malaysia; Nur Ayuni Farhana; Nur Suryani Taibi; Muslifah Zulkifli
50 m rifle 3 positions	Olga Dovgun; Kazakhstan	Jeong Mi-ra; South Korea	Chang Jing; China
50 m rifle 3 positions team	China; Chang Jing; Chen Dongqi; Zhao Huixin	South Korea; Jeong Mi-ra; Kim Seol-a; Yoo Seo-young	Kazakhstan; Olga Dovgun; Yelizaveta Lunina; Alexandra Malinovskaya
10 m running target	Li Xueyan; China	Su Li; China	Nguyễn Thị Thu Hằng; Vietnam
10 m running target team	China; Li Xueyan; Su Li; Yang Zeng	Vietnam; Đặng Hồng Hà; Nguyễn Thị Lệ Quyên; Nguyễn Thị Thu Hằng	Qatar; Anisa Saleh Juma; Amal Mohammed; Saaida Humaid Taaeeb
Trap	Zhu Jingyu; China	Yukie Nakayama; Japan	Chattaya Kitcharoen; Thailand
Trap team	Kazakhstan; Anastassiya Davydova; Mariya Dmitriyenko; Oxana Sereda	China; Chen Fang; Zhu Jingyu; Zhu Mei	North Korea; Chae Hye-gyong; Pak Yong-hui; Yang Sol-i
Double trap	Kim Mi-jin; South Korea	Zhang Yafei; China	Bai Yiting; China
Double trap team	China; Bai Yiting; Zhang Yafei; Zhu Mei	South Korea; Kim Mi-jin; Lee Bo-na; Son Hye-kyoung	India; Shagun Chowdhary; Shreyasi Singh; Varsha Varman
Skeet	Kim Min-ji; South Korea	Zhang Heng; China	Sutiya Jiewchaloemmit; Thailand
Skeet team	China; Li Bowen; Lin Piaopiao; Zhang Heng	South Korea; Kim Min-ji; Kwak Yu-hyun; Son Hye-kyoung	Thailand; Isarapa Imprasertsuk; Sutiya Jiewchaloemmit; Nutchaya Sutarporn

== Medal table ==
Rank	Nation	Gold	Silver	Bronze	Total
1	China (CHN)	27	17	6	50
2	South Korea (KOR)	8	11	8	27
3	Kazakhstan (KAZ)	2	0	5	7
4	Qatar (QAT)	2	0	1	3
5	Kuwait (KUW)	1	4	1	6
6	North Korea (PRK)	1	3	1	5
7	Iran (IRI)	1	2	0	3
8	India (IND)	1	1	7	9
9	Mongolia (MGL)	1	0	2	3
10	Vietnam (VIE)	0	2	5	7
11	Malaysia (MAS)	0	2	1	3
12	Japan (JPN)	0	1	1	2
13	Chinese Taipei (TPE)	0	1	0	1
14	Thailand (THA)	0	0	3	3
15	Singapore (SIN)	0	0	2	2
16	United Arab Emirates (UAE)	0	0	1	1
Totals (16 entries)		44	44	44	132

== Participating nations ==
A total of 543 athletes from 34 nations competed in shooting at the 2014 Asian Games:

- Bahrain (10)
- Bangladesh (13)
- Bhutan (1)
- China (52)
- Chinese Taipei (16)
- Hong Kong (4)
- India (43)
- Iran (23)
- Japan (18)
- Kazakhstan (31)
- Kuwait (23)
- Kyrgyzstan (2)
- Laos (3)
- Lebanon (7)
- Macau (7)
- Malaysia (12)
- Maldives (6)
- Mongolia (15)
- Myanmar (6)
- Nepal (4)
- North Korea (9)
- Oman (10)
- Pakistan (13)
- Philippines (2)
- Qatar (37)
- Saudi Arabia (15)
- Singapore (17)
- South Korea (50)
- Syria (1)
- Tajikistan (11)
- Thailand (36)
- United Arab Emirates (9)
- Uzbekistan (13)
- Vietnam (24)
