= Shooting at the 2014 Asian Games – Men's 25 metre center fire pistol team =

Men's 25 metre center fire pistol team at the 2014 Asian Games
- Venue: Ongnyeon International Shooting Range
- Dates: 26 September 2014
- Competitors: 24 from 8 nations

Medalists
gold medal	China; Ding Feng, Jin Yongde, Li Chuanlin
silver medal	India; Vijay Kumar, Gurpreet Singh, Pemba Tamang
bronze medal	South Korea; Jang Dae-kyu, Kim Jin-il, Kim Young-min

The men's 25 metre center-fire pistol team competition at the 2014 Asian Games in Incheon, South Korea was held on 26 September at the Ongnyeon International Shooting Range.

== Schedule ==
All times are Korea Standard Time (UTC+09:00)

Date	Time	Event
Friday, 26 September 2014	09:00	Final

== Records ==
Prior to this competition, the existing world, Asian and Games records were as follows.

World Record	Soviet Union	1762	Moscow, Soviet Union	15 August 1990
Asian Record	South Korea	1760	Lahti, Finland	14 July 2002
Games Record	North Korea; South Korea	1749	Bangkok, Thailand	13 December 1998

== Results ==
Rank	Team	Precision			Rapid			Total	Xs	Notes
Rank	Team	1	2	3	1	2	3	Total	Xs	Notes
1st place, gold medalist(s)	China (CHN)	290	289	286	291	294	292	1742	56	
	Ding Feng	96	95	94	99	97	97	578	17	
	Jin Yongde	98	96	98	96	98	99	585	21	
	Li Chuanlin	96	98	94	96	99	96	579	18	
2nd place, silver medalist(s)	India (IND)	286	289	290	294	291	290	1740	68	
	Vijay Kumar	95	94	96	100	98	96	579	21	
	Gurpreet Singh	98	99	95	95	96	97	580	25	
	Pemba Tamang	93	96	99	99	97	97	581	22	
3rd place, bronze medalist(s)	South Korea (KOR)	283	289	293	289	293	292	1739	54	
	Jang Dae-kyu	95	97	98	94	98	98	580	17	
	Kim Jin-il	95	94	97	97	97	96	576	14	
	Kim Young-min	93	98	98	98	98	98	583	23	
4	Vietnam (VIE)	289	293	287	287	290	288	1734	59	
	Bùi Quang Nam	96	97	96	94	96	92	571	17	
	Hà Minh Thành	95	98	93	98	99	98	581	23	
	Hoàng Xuân Vinh	98	98	98	95	95	98	582	19	
5	Qatar (QAT)	283	284	288	289	286	295	1725	50	
	Oleg Engachev	94	97	97	99	100	98	585	23	
	Riaz Khan	94	93	96	94	95	98	570	10	
	Azizjon Mukhamedrakhimov	95	94	95	96	91	99	570	17	
6	Singapore (SIN)	288	290	289	284	284	287	1722	54	
	Gai Bin	96	98	97	99	96	98	584	21	
	Lim Swee Hon	94	98	97	88	90	95	562	19	
	Poh Lip Meng	98	94	95	97	98	94	576	14	
7	Thailand (THA)	283	289	284	291	275	291	1713	48	
	Kasem Khamhaeng	94	96	91	96	84	97	558	18	
	Pongpol Kulchairattana	93	97	97	97	99	99	582	18	
	Sumate Pungmarai	96	96	96	98	92	95	573	12	
8	Saudi Arabia (KSA)	270	284	294	282	255	279	1664	46	
	Mohammed Al-Amri	92	92	97	98	73	90	542	17	
	Aqeel Al-Badrani	93	97	100	91	88	91	560	14	
	Safar Al-Dosari	85	95	97	93	94	98	562	15	
