= Shooting at the 2014 Asian Games – Men's 25 metre center fire pistol =

Men's 25 metre center fire pistol at the 2014 Asian Games
- Venue: Ongnyeon International Shooting Range
- Dates: 26 September 2014
- Competitors: 29 from 12 nations

Medalists
| gold medal | Oleg Engachev | Qatar |
| silver medal | Jin Yongde | China |
| bronze medal | Gai Bin | Singapore |

The men's 25 metre center-fire pistol competition at the 2014 Asian Games in Incheon, South Korea was held on 26 September at the Ongnyeon International Shooting Range.

== Schedule ==
All times are Korea Standard Time (UTC+09:00)

| Date | Time | Event |
|---|---|---|
| Friday, 26 September 2014 | 09:00 | Final |

== Records ==
Prior to this competition, the existing world, Asian and Games records were as follows.

| World Record | Mikhail Nestruyev (RUS) | 594 | Granada, Spain | 17 July 2007 |
| Asian Record | Park Byung-Taek (KOR) | 590 | Lahti, Finland | 14 July 2002 |
| Games Record | Jaspal Rana (IND) | 590 | Doha, Qatar | 8 December 2006 |

== Results ==
Legend

- DNS — Did not start

| Rank | Athlete | Precision | | | Rapid | | | Total | Xs | S-off | Notes |
| Rank | Athlete | 1 | 2 | 3 | 1 | 2 | 3 | Total | Xs | S-off | Notes |
|---|---|---|---|---|---|---|---|---|---|---|---|
| 1st place, gold medalist(s) | Oleg Engachev (QAT) | 94 | 97 | 97 | 99 | 100 | 98 | 585 | 23 | 49 | |
| 2nd place, silver medalist(s) | Jin Yongde (CHN) | 98 | 96 | 98 | 96 | 98 | 99 | 585 | 21 | 44 | |
| 3rd place, bronze medalist(s) | Gai Bin (SIN) | 96 | 98 | 97 | 99 | 96 | 98 | 584 | 21 | | |
| 4 | Kim Young-min (KOR) | 93 | 98 | 98 | 98 | 98 | 98 | 583 | 23 | | |
| 5 | Hoàng Xuân Vinh (VIE) | 98 | 98 | 98 | 95 | 95 | 98 | 582 | 19 | | |
| 6 | Pongpol Kulchairattana (THA) | 93 | 97 | 97 | 97 | 99 | 99 | 582 | 18 | | |
| 7 | Hà Minh Thành (VIE) | 95 | 98 | 93 | 98 | 99 | 98 | 581 | 23 | | |
| 8 | Pemba Tamang (IND) | 93 | 96 | 99 | 99 | 97 | 97 | 581 | 22 | | |
| 9 | Gurpreet Singh (IND) | 98 | 99 | 95 | 95 | 96 | 97 | 580 | 25 | | |
| 10 | Ghulam Mustafa Bashir (PAK) | 96 | 95 | 95 | 98 | 98 | 98 | 580 | 21 | | |
| 11 | Jang Dae-kyu (KOR) | 95 | 97 | 98 | 94 | 98 | 98 | 580 | 17 | | |
| 12 | Vijay Kumar (IND) | 95 | 94 | 96 | 100 | 98 | 96 | 579 | 21 | | |
| 13 | Li Chuanlin (CHN) | 96 | 98 | 94 | 96 | 99 | 96 | 579 | 18 | | |
| 14 | Ding Feng (CHN) | 96 | 95 | 94 | 99 | 97 | 97 | 578 | 17 | | |
| 15 | Kim Jin-il (KOR) | 95 | 94 | 97 | 97 | 97 | 96 | 576 | 14 | | |
| 16 | Poh Lip Meng (SIN) | 98 | 94 | 95 | 97 | 98 | 94 | 576 | 14 | | |
| 17 | Sumate Pungmarai (THA) | 96 | 96 | 96 | 98 | 92 | 95 | 573 | 12 | | |
| 18 | Bùi Quang Nam (VIE) | 96 | 97 | 96 | 94 | 96 | 92 | 571 | 17 | | |
| 19 | Azizjon Mukhamedrakhimov (QAT) | 95 | 94 | 95 | 96 | 91 | 99 | 570 | 17 | | |
| 20 | Riaz Khan (QAT) | 94 | 93 | 96 | 94 | 95 | 98 | 570 | 10 | | |
| 21 | Said Al-Hashmi (OMA) | 95 | 92 | 95 | 97 | 92 | 92 | 563 | 13 | | |
| 22 | Lim Swee Hon (SIN) | 94 | 98 | 97 | 88 | 90 | 95 | 562 | 19 | | |
| 23 | Safar Al-Dosari (KSA) | 85 | 95 | 97 | 93 | 94 | 98 | 562 | 15 | | |
| 24 | Aqeel Al-Badrani (KSA) | 93 | 97 | 100 | 91 | 88 | 91 | 560 | 14 | | |
| 25 | Kasem Khamhaeng (THA) | 94 | 96 | 91 | 96 | 84 | 97 | 558 | 18 | | |
| 26 | Jamal Al-Hattali (OMA) | 92 | 95 | 96 | 87 | 93 | 93 | 556 | 7 | | |
| 27 | Chio Hong Chi (MAC) | 92 | 92 | 89 | 92 | 85 | 94 | 544 | 9 | | |
| 28 | Mohammed Al-Amri (KSA) | 92 | 92 | 97 | 98 | 73 | 90 | 542 | 17 | | |
| — | Enkhtaivany Davaakhüü (MGL) | | | | | | | DNS | | | |
