= Shooting at the 2014 Asian Games – Men's 25 metre standard pistol team =

Men's 25 metre standard pistol team at the 2014 Asian Games
- Venue: Ongnyeon International Shooting Range
- Dates: 25 September 2014
- Competitors: 27 from 9 nations

Medalists
gold medal	China; Ding Feng, Jin Yongde, Li Chuanlin
silver medal	South Korea; Jang Dae-kyu, Kang Min-su, Kim Jun-hong
bronze medal	Singapore; Gai Bin, Lim Swee Hon, Poh Lip Meng

The men's 25 metre standard pistol team competition at the 2014 Asian Games in Incheon, South Korea was held on 25 September at the Ongnyeon International Shooting Range.

== Schedule ==
All times are Korea Standard Time (UTC+09:00)

Date	Time	Event
Thursday, 25 September 2014	09:00	Final

== Records ==
Prior to this competition, the existing world, Asian and Games records were as follows.

World Record	Soviet Union	1725	Osijek, Yugoslavia	10 September 1985
Asian Record	China	1724	Busan, South Korea	8 October 2002
Games Record	China	1724	Busan, South Korea	8 October 2002

== Results ==
Rank	Team	150 Sec		20 Sec		10 Sec		Total	Xs	Notes
Rank	Team	1	2	1	2	1	2	Total	Xs	Notes
1st place, gold medalist(s)	China (CHN)	288	290	288	287	278	279	1710	44	
	Ding Feng	95	97	97	98	95	95	577	15	
	Jin Yongde	98	98	97	93	92	92	570	18	
	Li Chuanlin	95	95	94	96	91	92	563	11	
2nd place, silver medalist(s)	South Korea (KOR)	289	286	288	285	282	277	1707	37	
	Jang Dae-kyu	97	95	96	95	91	91	565	11	
	Kang Min-su	96	94	95	93	94	96	568	10	
	Kim Jun-hong	96	97	97	97	97	90	574	16	
3rd place, bronze medalist(s)	Singapore (SIN)	290	290	286	285	269	272	1692	43	
	Gai Bin	98	97	96	96	89	91	567	19	
	Lim Swee Hon	97	98	92	94	93	89	563	11	
	Poh Lip Meng	95	95	98	95	87	92	562	13	
4	Vietnam (VIE)	287	283	276	285	277	279	1687	38	
	Bùi Quang Nam	96	96	89	94	91	93	559	14	
	Hà Minh Thành	95	98	97	95	94	92	571	13	
	Kiều Thanh Tú	96	89	90	96	92	94	557	11	
5	India (IND)	289	284	277	284	276	274	1684	34	
	Samaresh Jung	94	94	87	97	93	90	555	7	
	Gurpreet Singh	97	97	95	96	94	91	570	14	
	Mahaveer Singh	98	93	95	91	89	93	559	13	
6	Qatar (QAT)	283	284	277	277	276	277	1674	27	
	Oleg Engachev	97	96	96	92	93	94	568	12	
	Riaz Khan	91	93	91	92	91	87	545	6	
	Azizjon Mukhamedrakhimov	95	95	90	93	92	96	561	9	
7	Thailand (THA)	282	283	267	271	282	279	1664	28	
	Aekkata Attanon	93	92	91	89	96	95	556	10	
	Pongpol Kulchairattana	97	93	88	89	94	94	555	10	
	Sumate Pungmarai	92	98	88	93	92	90	553	8	
8	Kazakhstan (KAZ)	289	280	267	280	267	266	1649	23	
	Vladimir Issachenko	97	91	91	97	88	78	542	11	
	Sergey Vokhmyanin	96	94	87	92	91	91	551	4	
	Rashid Yunusmetov	96	95	89	91	88	97	556	8	
9	Saudi Arabia (KSA)	286	291	262	267	266	265	1637	25	
	Mohammed Al-Amri	94	97	85	92	90	89	547	10	
	Aqeel Al-Badrani	98	99	89	82	86	85	539	8	
	Safar Al-Dosari	94	95	88	93	90	91	551	7	
