= Shooting at the 2014 Asian Games – Men's 25 metre standard pistol =

Men's 25 metre standard pistol at the 2014 Asian Games
- Venue: Ongnyeon International Shooting Range
- Dates: 25 September 2014
- Competitors: 33 from 14 nations

Medalists
gold medal	Ding Feng	China
silver medal	Kim Jun-hong	South Korea
bronze medal	Hà Minh Thành	Vietnam

The men's 25 metre standard pistol competition at the 2014 Asian Games in Incheon, South Korea was held on 25 September at the Ongnyeon International Shooting Range.

== Schedule ==
All times are Korea Standard Time (UTC+09:00)

Date	Time	Event
Thursday, 25 September 2014	09:00	Final

== Records ==
Prior to this competition, the existing world, Asian and Games records were as follows.

World Record	Erich Buljung (USA)	584	Caracas, Venezuela	20 August 1983
Asian Record	Liu Guohui (CHN)	580	Kuala Lumpur, Malaysia	17 February 2004
Games Record	Opas Ruengpanyawut (THA)	579	Busan, South Korea	8 October 2002

== Results ==
Legend

- DNS — Did not start

Rank	Athlete	150 Sec		20 Sec		10 Sec		Total	Xs	S-off	Notes
Rank	Athlete	1	2	1	2	1	2	Total	Xs	S-off	Notes
1st place, gold medalist(s)	Ding Feng (CHN)	95	97	97	98	95	95	577	15		
2nd place, silver medalist(s)	Kim Jun-hong (KOR)	96	97	97	97	97	90	574	16		
3rd place, bronze medalist(s)	Hà Minh Thành (VIE)	95	98	97	95	94	92	571	13		
4	Jin Yongde (CHN)	98	98	97	93	92	92	570	18		
5	Gurpreet Singh (IND)	97	97	95	96	94	91	570	14		
6	Oleg Engachev (QAT)	97	96	96	92	93	94	568	12		
7	Kang Min-su (KOR)	96	94	95	93	94	96	568	10		
8	Gai Bin (SIN)	98	97	96	96	89	91	567	19		
9	Jang Dae-kyu (KOR)	97	95	96	95	91	91	565	11		
10	Li Chuanlin (CHN)	95	95	94	96	91	92	563	11		
11	Lim Swee Hon (SIN)	97	98	92	94	93	89	563	11		
12	Poh Lip Meng (SIN)	95	95	98	95	87	92	562	13		
13	Jamal Al-Hattali (OMA)	95	96	95	96	89	91	562	12		
14	Azizjon Mukhamedrakhimov (QAT)	95	95	90	93	92	96	561	9		
15	Man Chun Kit (HKG)	93	97	96	94	90	90	560	17		
16	Bùi Quang Nam (VIE)	96	96	89	94	91	93	559	14		
17	Mahaveer Singh (IND)	98	93	95	91	89	93	559	13		
18	Kiều Thanh Tú (VIE)	96	89	90	96	92	94	557	11		
19	Chio Hong Chi (MAC)	97	94	90	93	90	93	557	10		
20	Aekkata Attanon (THA)	93	92	91	89	96	95	556	10		
21	Rashid Yunusmetov (KAZ)	96	95	89	91	88	97	556	8		
22	Said Al-Hashmi (OMA)	93	97	94	93	87	91	555	12		
23	Pongpol Kulchairattana (THA)	97	93	88	89	94	94	555	10		
24	Samaresh Jung (IND)	94	94	87	97	93	90	555	7		
25	Sumate Pungmarai (THA)	92	98	88	93	92	90	553	8		
26	Safar Al-Dosari (KSA)	94	95	88	93	90	91	551	7		
27	Sergey Vokhmyanin (KAZ)	96	94	87	92	91	91	551	4		
28	Mohammed Al-Amri (KSA)	94	97	85	92	90	89	547	10		
29	Riaz Khan (QAT)	91	93	91	92	91	87	545	6		
30	Vladimir Issachenko (KAZ)	97	91	91	97	88	78	542	11		
31	Aqeel Al-Badrani (KSA)	98	99	89	82	86	85	539	8		
32	Ismaeel Shafeeq (MDV)	89	88	76	76	76	84	489	6		
—	Enkhtaivany Davaakhüü (MGL)							DNS			
