= Shooting at the 2010 Asian Games – Women's 10 metre running target =

Women's 10 metre running target at the 2010 Asian Games
- Venue: Aoti Shooting Range
- Dates: 15 November 2010
- Competitors: 19 from 7 nations

Medalists
| gold medal | Li Xueyan | China |
| silver medal | Su Li | China |
| bronze medal | Ri Hyang-sim | North Korea |

The women's 10 metre running target competition at the 2010 Asian Games in Guangzhou, China was held on 15 November at the Aoti Shooting Range.

== Schedule ==
All times are China Standard Time (UTC+08:00)

| Date | Time | Event |
|---|---|---|
| Monday, 15 November 2010 | 09:00 | Slow |
| Monday, 15 November 2010 | 11:00 | Fast |

== Records ==
Prior to this competition, the existing world, Asian and Games records were as follows.

| World Record | Xu Xuan (CHN) | 391 | Lahti, Finland | 6 July 2002 |
| Asian Record | Xu Xuan (CHN) | 391 | Lahti, Finland | 6 July 2002 |
| Games Record | Xu Xuan (CHN) | 389 | Busan, South Korea | 6 October 2002 |

== Results ==
| Rank | Athlete | Slow | | Fast | | Total | Xs | S-off | Notes |
| Rank | Athlete | 1 | 2 | 1 | 2 | Total | Xs | S-off | Notes |
|---|---|---|---|---|---|---|---|---|---|
| 1st place, gold medalist(s) | Li Xueyan (CHN) | 96 | 98 | 95 | 99 | 388 | 15 | | |
| 2nd place, silver medalist(s) | Su Li (CHN) | 94 | 98 | 91 | 97 | 380 | 12 | | |
| 3 | Yang Zeng (CHN) | 96 | 96 | 92 | 94 | 378 | 10 | | |
| 3rd place, bronze medalist(s) | Ri Hyang-sim (PRK) | 97 | 92 | 95 | 90 | 374 | 9 | | |
| 5 | Natalya Gurova (KAZ) | 94 | 95 | 91 | 87 | 367 | 8 | | |
| 6 | Cù Thị Thanh Tú (VIE) | 96 | 90 | 93 | 85 | 364 | 9 | | |
| 7 | Nguyễn Thị Thu Hằng (VIE) | 97 | 89 | 85 | 90 | 361 | 5 | | |
| 8 | Đặng Hồng Hà (VIE) | 92 | 92 | 91 | 84 | 359 | 7 | | |
| 9 | Jo Hyang (PRK) | 91 | 94 | 82 | 88 | 355 | 6 | | |
| 10 | Khamla Xayyavong (LAO) | 91 | 92 | 82 | 86 | 351 | 3 | | |
| 11 | Hongkham Xayyalath (LAO) | 95 | 90 | 78 | 85 | 348 | 7 | | |
| 12 | Thidarat Attakit (THA) | 86 | 92 | 87 | 81 | 346 | 5 | | |
| 13 | Botagoz Issenova (KAZ) | 91 | 86 | 89 | 80 | 346 | 3 | | |
| 14 | Anisa Saleh Juma (QAT) | 91 | 91 | 86 | 77 | 345 | 8 | | |
| 15 | Samsam Saleh Juma (QAT) | 82 | 89 | 83 | 86 | 340 | 4 | | |
| 16 | Pak Hyon-a (PRK) | 86 | 91 | 79 | 83 | 339 | 3 | | |
| 17 | Phoutsady Phommachanh (LAO) | 80 | 86 | 82 | 86 | 334 | 4 | | |
| 18 | Veranika Glushich (KAZ) | 84 | 73 | 89 | 80 | 326 | 4 | | |
| 19 | Khadiga Omer Serag (QAT) | 85 | 87 | 69 | 79 | 320 | 1 | | |

- Ri Hyang-sim was awarded bronze because of no three-medal sweep per country rule.
