= Shooting at the 2014 Asian Games – Women's 10 metre running target =

Women's 10 metre running target at the 2014 Asian Games
- Venue: Ongnyeon International Shooting Range
- Dates: 26 September 2014
- Competitors: 21 from 7 nations

Medalists
gold medal	Li Xueyan	China
silver medal	Su Li	China
bronze medal	Nguyễn Thị Thu Hằng	Vietnam

The women's 10 metre running target competition at the 2014 Asian Games in Incheon, South Korea was held on 26 September at the Ongnyeon International Shooting Range.

== Schedule ==
All times are Korea Standard Time (UTC+09:00)

Date	Time	Event
Friday, 26 September 2014	09:00	Qualification
Friday, 26 September 2014	14:00	Semifinals
Friday, 26 September 2014	14:00	Finals

== Records ==
Prior to this competition, the existing world, Asian and Games records were as follows.

World Record	Xu Xuan (CHN)	391	Lahti, Finland	6 July 2002
Asian Record	Xu Xuan (CHN)	391	Lahti, Finland	6 July 2002
Games Record	Xu Xuan (CHN)	389	Busan, South Korea	6 October 2002

== Results ==
=== Qualification ===
Rank	Athlete	Slow		Fast		Total	Xs	S-off	Notes
Rank	Athlete	1	2	1	2	Total	Xs	S-off	Notes
1	Li Xueyan (CHN)	96	100	92	96	384	10		
2	Yang Zeng (CHN)	98	98	94	93	383	8		
3	Su Li (CHN)	97	93	97	94	381	9		
4	Nguyễn Thị Thu Hằng (VIE)	96	94	94	91	375	8		
5	Đặng Hồng Hà (VIE)	93	97	91	89	370	10		
6	Natalya Gurova (KAZ)	94	95	90	87	366	5		
7	Ri Hyang-sim (PRK)	88	93	91	90	362	4		
8	Nguyễn Thị Lệ Quyên (VIE)	92	92	89	88	361	3		
9	Lee Joo-hyun (KOR)	93	90	90	87	360	7		
10	Amal Mohammed (QAT)	90	86	91	92	359	6		
11	Saaida Humaid Taaeeb (QAT)	92	91	91	83	357	2		
12	Anisa Saleh Juma (QAT)	89	90	86	92	357	1		
13	Jo Hyang (PRK)	89	91	84	91	355	4		
14	Pak Hyon-a (PRK)	90	85	89	88	352	7		
15	Hongkham Xayyalath (LAO)	94	92	88	78	352	6		
16	Lim Kyeong-ah (KOR)	92	89	83	86	350	7		
17	Kwon Ji-eun (KOR)	86	91	84	89	350	6		
18	Botagoz Issenova (KAZ)	84	97	77	86	344	2		
19	Phoutsady Phommachanh (LAO)	85	88	85	77	335	4		
20	Khamla Xayyavong (LAO)	82	89	78	82	331	5		
21	Natalya Yunusmetova (KAZ)	81	86	78	85	330	2		

=== Knockout round ===
Semifinals
1	Li Xueyan (CHN)	6
4	Nguyễn Thị Thu Hằng (VIE)	4
2	Yang Zeng (CHN)	3
3	Su Li (CHN)	6

Gold medal match
1	Li Xueyan (CHN)	6
3	Su Li (CHN)	3
Bronze medal match
4	Nguyễn Thị Thu Hằng (VIE)	6
2	Yang Zeng (CHN)	4

==== Semifinals ====
Athlete	Score	1	2	3	4	5	6	7	8	9	10
Li Xueyan (CHN)	6	9.0	10.3	10.2	10.2	10.5	10.0	5.7	9.9	10.8	10.6
Nguyễn Thị Thu Hằng (VIE)	4	9.4	10.6	7.9	10.5	8.9	9.5	10.5	9.6	10.6	9.7
Su Li (CHN)	6	9.3	9.1	10.4	9.4	10.0	10.6	10.7	10.4	5.9	10.0
Yang Zeng (CHN)	3	9.3	7.4	10.0	10.4	8.9	10.2	9.0	10.8	10.3	8.4

==== Bronze medal match ====
Athlete	Score	1	2	3	4	5	6	7	8	9	10	11
Nguyễn Thị Thu Hằng (VIE)	6	8.7	10.0	10.5	10.1	8.0	3.6	9.9	9.9	9.7	10.7	10.2
Yang Zeng (CHN)	4	9.3	10.9	9.9	10.1	7.8	10.1	9.3	7.4	10.6	9.0	10.1

==== Gold medal match ====
Athlete	Score	1	2	3	4	5	6	7	8	9
Li Xueyan (CHN)	6	10.2	10.1	9.8	9.2	10.2	10.7	9.0	10.3	9.6
Su Li (CHN)	3	9.6	9.7	10.3	10.1	10.1	10.2	9.5	9.7	7.9
