= Shooting at the 2010 Asian Games – Women's 10 metre running target team =

Women's 10 metre running target team at the 2010 Asian Games
- Venue: Aoti Shooting Range
- Dates: 15 November 2010
- Competitors: 18 from 6 nations

Medalists
gold medal	China; Li Xueyan, Su Li, Yang Zeng
silver medal	Vietnam; Cù Thị Thanh Tú, Đặng Hồng Hà, Nguyễn Thị Thu Hằng
bronze medal	North Korea; Jo Hyang, Pak Hyon-a, Ri Hyang-sim

The women's 10 metre running target team competition at the 2010 Asian Games in Guangzhou, China was held on 15 November at the Aoti Shooting Range.

== Schedule ==
All times are China Standard Time (UTC+08:00)

Date	Time	Event
Monday, 15 November 2010	09:00	Slow
Monday, 15 November 2010	11:00	Fast

== Records ==
Prior to this competition, the existing world, Asian and Games records were as follows.

World Record	China	1150	Lahti, Finland	6 July 2002
Asian Record	China	1150	Lahti, Finland	6 July 2002
Games Record	China	1141	Busan, South Korea	6 October 2002

== Results ==
Rank	Team	Slow		Fast		Total	Xs	Notes
Rank	Team	1	2	1	2	Total	Xs	Notes
1st place, gold medalist(s)	China (CHN)	286	292	278	290	1146	37	GR
	Li Xueyan	96	98	95	99	388	15	
	Su Li	94	98	91	97	380	12	
	Yang Zeng	96	96	92	94	378	10	
2nd place, silver medalist(s)	Vietnam (VIE)	285	271	269	259	1084	21	
	Cù Thị Thanh Tú	96	90	93	85	364	9	
	Đặng Hồng Hà	92	92	91	84	359	7	
	Nguyễn Thị Thu Hằng	97	89	85	90	361	5	
3rd place, bronze medalist(s)	North Korea (PRK)	274	277	256	261	1068	18	
	Jo Hyang	91	94	82	88	355	6	
	Pak Hyon-a	86	91	79	83	339	3	
	Ri Hyang-sim	97	92	95	90	374	9	
4	Kazakhstan (KAZ)	269	254	269	247	1039	15	
	Veranika Glushich	84	73	89	80	326	4	
	Natalya Gurova	94	95	91	87	367	8	
	Botagoz Issenova	91	86	89	80	346	3	
5	Laos (LAO)	266	268	242	257	1033	14	
	Phoutsady Phommachanh	80	86	82	86	334	4	
	Hongkham Xayyalath	95	90	78	85	348	7	
	Khamla Xayyavong	91	92	82	86	351	3	
6	Qatar (QAT)	258	267	238	242	1005	13	
	Anisa Saleh Juma	91	91	86	77	345	8	
	Samsam Saleh Juma	82	89	83	86	340	4	
	Khadiga Omer Serag	85	87	69	79	320	1	
