= 2010 ISSF World Shooting Championships =

International sport shooting competition

The 50th ISSF World Shooting Championships was held in Munich, Germany from July 29, 2010, to August 10, 2010.

== Rifle events ==
=== Men ===
Pos	Individual			Team		Junior			Junior Team	
Men's 300 m Rifle Three Positions
1st place, gold medalist(s)	Marcel Bürge	Switzerland	1182^{+44}	Switzerland	3516^{+142}					
2nd place, silver medalist(s)	Vebjørn Berg	Norway	1179^{+58}	France	3513^{+151}					
3rd place, bronze medalist(s)	Josselin Henry	France	1179^{+51}	Norway	3503^{+152}					
Men's 300 m Rifle Prone
1st place, gold medalist(s)	Stefan Raser	Austria	599^{+36}	United Kingdom	1792^{+89}					
2nd place, silver medalist(s)	Carsten Brandt	Austria	599^{+26}	Austria	1791^{+104}					
3rd place, bronze medalist(s)	Vebjørn Berg	Norway	598^{+44}	France	1790^{+104}					
Men's 300 m Standard Rifle
1st place, gold medalist(s)	Josselin Henry	France	587^{+21}	Switzerland	1745^{+70}					
2nd place, silver medalist(s)	Robert Markoja	Slovenia	585^{+17}	Norway	1744^{+64}					
3rd place, bronze medalist(s)	Vebjørn Berg	Norway	584^{+24}	Slovenia	1740^{+55}					
Men's 50 m Rifle Three Positions
1st place, gold medalist(s)	Péter Sidi	Hungary	1275.6	Russia	3504	Kim Andre Lund	Norway	1166^{+55}	China	3478^{+136}WRJ
2nd place, silver medalist(s)	Han Jin-Seop	South Korea	1274.2	Norway	3501	Illia Charheika	Belarus	1165^{+59}	Switzerland	3469^{+139}
3rd place, bronze medalist(s)	Nemanja Mirosavljev	Serbia	1273.3	Ukraine	3500	Serhiy Kulish	Ukraine	1165^{+51}	Austria	3458^{+141}
Men's 50 m Rifle Prone
1st place, gold medalist(s)	Sergei Martynov	Belarus	703.9	United States	1791	Wu Jianing	China	595^{+40}	Poland	1777^{+94}
2nd place, silver medalist(s)	Valérian Sauveplane	France	703.8	South Korea	1791	Leor Ovadia Madlal	Israel	595^{+38}	Germany	1776^{+106}
3rd place, bronze medalist(s)	Matthew Emmons	United States	702.2	Russia	1790	Sebastian Drawert	Germany	595^{+33}	United States	1774^{+97}
Men's 10 m Air Rifle
1st place, gold medalist(s)	Niccolò Campriani	Italy	702.5	China	1787	Sergiy Kasper	Ukraine	595	China	1774
2nd place, silver medalist(s)	Péter Sidi	Hungary	700.4	Russia	1787	Serhiy Kulish	Ukraine	594	Ukraine	1772
3rd place, bronze medalist(s)	Gagan Narang	India	699	Italy	1782	Alexander Dryagin	Russia	593	Russia	1771

=== Women ===
Pos	Individual			Team		Junior			Junior Team	
Women's 300 m Rifle Three Positions
1st place, gold medalist(s)	Gyda Ellefsplass Olssen	Norway	583^{+18}	Poland	1727^{+51}					
2nd place, silver medalist(s)	Charlotte Jakobsen	Denmark	583^{+17}	United States	1723^{+47}					
3rd place, bronze medalist(s)	Eva Friedel	Germany	578^{+24}	Germany	1716^{+61}					
Women's 300 m Rifle Prone
1st place, gold medalist(s)	Bettina Bucher	Switzerland	599^{+37} (EWR)	France	1787^{+88 (WR)}					
2nd place, silver medalist(s)	Charlotte Jakobsen	Denmark	597^{+37}	Germany	1784^{+87}					
3rd place, bronze medalist(s)	Catherine Houlmont	France	597^{+29}	Poland	1774^{+88}					
Women's 50 m Rifle Three Positions
1st place, gold medalist(s)	Barbara Lechner	Germany	687.7	United States	1758^{+86 (WR)}	Stine Nielsen	Denmark	587^{26}	United States	1747^{+84}
2nd place, silver medalist(s)	Sonja Pfeilschifter	Germany	685.4	Germany	1757^{+92}	Sarah Scherer	United States	585^{24}	Germany	1733^{+82}
3rd place, bronze medalist(s)	Annik Marguet	Switzerland	681.2	Serbia	1754^{+80}	Elin Karlsson	Sweden	582^{28}	China	1728^{+74}
Women's 50 m Rifle Prone
1st place, gold medalist(s)	Tejaswini Sawant	India	597^{+41} (EWR)	Switzerland	1780^{+111}	Sharon Barazani	United States	596^{+45}	Czech Republic	1780^{+120} (WRJ)
2nd place, silver medalist(s)	Joanna Ewa Nowakowska	Poland	597^{+39} (EWR)	Germany	1780^{+110}	Sarah Beard	United States	595^{+44}	Austria	1772^{+99}
3rd place, bronze medalist(s)	Olga Dovgun	Kazakhstan	596^{+45}	South Korea	1779^{+107}	Jennifer McIntosh	United Kingdom	594^{+44}	Ukraine	1772^{+93}
Women's 10 m Air Rifle
1st place, gold medalist(s)	Yi Siling	China	505.6	Germany	1190^{+99}	Manchulika Manakit	Japan	397^{+34}	South Korea	1185^{+84}
2nd place, silver medalist(s)	Wu Liuxi	China	501.4	China	1189^{+94}	Eunjeong Bae	South Korea	397^{+31}	Austria	1182^{+87}
3rd place, bronze medalist(s)	Elania Nardelli	Italy	501.0	United States	1188^{+98}	Dong Lijie	China	396^{+33}	Thailand	1181^{+86}

== Pistol events ==
=== Men ===
Pos	Individual			Team		Junior			Junior Team	
Men's 50 m Pistol
1st place, gold medalist(s)	Tomoyuki Matsuda	Japan	669.7	South Korea	1686	Tomasz Palamarz	Poland	558^{+13}	Germany	1626^{+12}
2nd place, silver medalist(s)	Lee Dae-myung	South Korea	665.2	China	1681	Dino Briganti	Italy	558^{+7}	Russia	1625^{+20}
3rd place, bronze medalist(s)	Vyacheslav Podlesnyy	Kazakhstan	662.1	Spain	1680	Andreas Heise	Germany	552^{+5}	China	1622^{+12}
Men's 25 m Rapid Fire Pistol
1st place, gold medalist(s)	Alexei Klimov	Russia	787.1	China	1749^{+63}	Zhou Zhiguo	China	577^{+22}	China	1715^{+47}
2nd place, silver medalist(s)	Zhang Jian	China	785.6	Russia	1732^{+44}	Long Xuan Feng	China	574^{+9}	Germany	1698^{+50}
3rd place, bronze medalist(s)	Li Yuehong	China	782.1	United States	1731^{+50}	Alexander Alifirenko	Russia	570^{+11}	Russia	1687^{+37}
Men's 25 m Center-Fire Pistol						25 m Pistol				
1st place, gold medalist(s)	Leonid Yekimov	Russia	589^{+21}	Brazil	1748^{+67}	Florian Fouquet	France	581^{+18}	China	1716^{+32}
2nd place, silver medalist(s)	Júlio Almeida	Brazil	586^{+22}	France	1739^{+57}	Zhou Zhiguo	China	580^{+12}	Germany	1702^{+44}
3rd place, bronze medalist(s)	Pål Hembre	Norway	585^{+20}	South Korea	1735^{+63}	Alexander Alifirenko	Russia	578^{+13}	Switzerland	1701^{+46}
Men's 25 m Standard Pistol
1st place, gold medalist(s)	Hong Seong Hwan	South Korea	577^{+16}	China	1704^{+38}	Zhou Zhiguo	China	567^{+12}	China	1673^{+27}
2nd place, silver medalist(s)	Jin Yongde	China	574^{+16}	Germany	1703^{+41}	Aaron Sauter	Germany	560^{+12}	Germany	1667^{+34}
3rd place, bronze medalist(s)	Júlio Almeida	Brazil	574^{+16}	South Korea	1696^{+28}	Long Xuan Feng	China	560^{+7}	France	1666^{+27}
Men's 10 m Air Pistol
1st place, gold medalist(s)	Tomoyuki Matsuda	Japan	689.4	Russia	1749^{+64}	Zhang Bin	China	582^{+21}	China	1727^{+60}
2nd place, silver medalist(s)	Andrija Zlatić	Serbia	689.2	Serbia	1747^{+71}	Lukas Grunder	Switzerland	581^{+17}	Ukraine	1725^{+53}
3rd place, bronze medalist(s)	Jin Jong Oh	South Korea	689.1	South Korea	1742^{+64}	Andrii Sokol	Ukraine	580^{+22}	Belarus	1721^{+46}

=== Women ===
Pos	Individual			Team		Junior			Junior Team	
Women's 25 m Pistol
1st place, gold medalist(s)	Kira Klimova	Russia	788.8	Russia	1745^{+61}	Olga Nikulina	Russia	578^{+19}	Russia	1715^{+44}
2nd place, silver medalist(s)	Zorana Arunović	Serbia	788.8	Serbia	1741^{+45}	Sara Babicz	Hungary	577^{+14}	South Korea	1712^{+42}
3rd place, bronze medalist(s)	Lenka Maruskova	Czech Republic	788.6	Czech Republic	1739^{+57}	Ekaterina Levina	Russia	575^{+14}	China	1699^{+48}
Women's 10 m Air Pistol
1st place, gold medalist(s)	Zorana Arunović	Serbia	486.8	Australia	1145^{+33}	Khongorzul Tsagaandalai	Mongolia	382^{+10}	South Korea	1136^{+33}
2nd place, silver medalist(s)	Lalita Yauhleuskaya	Australia	485.0	South Korea	1143^{+32}	Alisson Gallien	France	381^{+10}	China	1130^{+26}
3rd place, bronze medalist(s)	Viktoria Chaika	Belarus	485.0	China	1142^{+31}	Kim Ye-ji	South Korea	380^{+14}	Poland	1117^{+22}

== Shotgun events ==
=== Men ===
Pos	Individual			Team		Junior			Junior Team	
Men's Trap
1st place, gold medalist(s)	Alberto Fernández	Spain	143	Italy	361	Julius Vass	Slovakia	121	United States	319
2nd place, silver medalist(s)	Alexey Alipov	Russia	142^{+2}	China	359	Giulio Fioravanti	Italy	120	Spain	316
3rd place, bronze medalist(s)	Jiri Liptak	Czech Republic	142^{+1}	San Marino	359	Valerio Grazini	Italy	118	Italy	313
Men's Double Trap
1st place, gold medalist(s)	Joshua Richmond	United States	196 (EFWR)	United States	433 (WR)	Asher Noria	India	146 (=WR)	Russia	410
2nd place, silver medalist(s)	Vasily Mosin	Russia	193^{+30 (EWR)}	Russia	427	Alessandro Chianese	Italy	141	Italy	407
3rd place, bronze medalist(s)	Hu Binyuan	China	193^{+29}	United Kingdom	425	Filip Praj	Slovakia	140	United States	392
Men's Skeet
1st place, gold medalist(s)	Valeriy Shomin	Russia	149^{+22}	Cyprus	364	Jon McGrath	United States	123	Czech Republic	357 (WRJ)
2nd place, silver medalist(s)	Ennio Falco	Italy	149^{+21}	Italy	363	Raul Franco Bostelman	Chile	122	United States	356
3rd place, bronze medalist(s)	Georgios Achilleos	Cyprus	149^{+10}	France	362	George Kazakos	Cyprus	121^{+8}	Germany	352

=== Women ===
Pos	Individual			Team		Junior			Junior Team	
Women's Trap
1st place, gold medalist(s)	Zuzana Štefečeková	Slovakia	91	Italy	211	Miranda Wilder	United States	69^{+10}	China	202
2nd place, silver medalist(s)	Liu Yingzi	China	89	China	209	Catherine Skinner	Australia	69^{+9}	Australia	194
3rd place, bronze medalist(s)	Jessica Rossi	Italy	87^{+3}	San Marino	207	Rachael Lynn Heiden	United States	68^{+1}	United States	194
Women's Double Trap
1st place, gold medalist(s)	Li Rui	China	115 (=WR)							
2nd place, silver medalist(s)	Zhang Yafei	China	109							
3rd place, bronze medalist(s)	Kang Gee-eun	South Korea	107							
Women's Skeet
1st place, gold medalist(s)	Kimberly Rhode	United States	97	Italy	194	Zhang Yue	China	68	China	172
2nd place, silver medalist(s)	Wei Ning	China	96	China	159	Nanna Nielsen	Denmark	66	United States	151
3rd place, bronze medalist(s)	Danka Barteková	Slovakia	95	Cyprus	148	Roxana Manole	Romania	65	Russia	142

== Running target events ==
=== Men ===
Pos	Individual			Team		Junior			Junior Team	
Men's 50 m Running Target
1st place, gold medalist(s)	Emil Martinsson	Sweden	590^{+0}	Russia	1765^{+0}	Yuri Dovgal	Russia	586^{+0}	Russia	1723^{+0}
2nd place, silver medalist(s)	Maxim Stepanov	Russia	589^{+0}	Sweden	1743^{+0}	Sami Heikkila	Finland	584^{+0}	Finland	1723^{+0}
3rd place, bronze medalist(s)	Alexander Zinenko	Ukraine	589^{+0}	Slovakia	1742^{+0}	Alexander Naumenko	Russia	577^{+0}	Ukraine	1705^{+0}
Men's 50 m Running Target Mixed
1st place, gold medalist(s)	Maxim Stepanov	Russia	394	Russia	1169^{+0}	Tomi-Pekka Heikkila	Finland	387	Finland	1143^{+0}
2nd place, silver medalist(s)	Miroslav Jurco	Slovakia	393	Slovakia	1159^{+0}	Yuri Dovgal	Russia	386	Ukraine	1133^{+0}
3rd place, bronze medalist(s)	Emil Martinsson	Sweden	391	Sweden	1155^{+0}	Josef Nikl	Czech Republic	384	Russia	1120^{+0}
Men's 10 m Running Target
1st place, gold medalist(s)	Dmitry Romanov	Russia	577^{+11}	Russia	1725^{+41}	Yuri Dobgal	Russia	567^{+12}	Russia	1673^{+39}
2nd place, silver medalist(s)	Zhai Yujia	China	576^{+9}	China	1707^{+34}	Alexander Naumenko	Russia	566^{+16}	Ukraine	1658^{+17}
3rd place, bronze medalist(s)	Krister Holmberg	Finland	577^{+12}	Ukraine	1706^{+41}	Josef Nikl	Czech Republic	563^{+8}	Finland	1649^{+31}
Men's 10 m Running Target Mixed
1st place, gold medalist(s)	Jo Yong Chol	North Korea	385	China	1143^{+31}	Alexander Naumenko	Russia	377	Russia	1113^{+19}
2nd place, silver medalist(s)	Zeng Guobin	China	384	Russia	1136^{+27}	Yuri Dovgal	Russia	374	Ukraine	1086^{+16}
3rd place, bronze medalist(s)	Jeong You Jin	South Korea	383	Slovakia	1133^{+20}	Igor Matskevych	Ukraine	373	Finland	1083^{+22}

=== Women ===
Pos	Individual			Team		Junior			Junior Team	
Women's 10 m Running Target
1st place, gold medalist(s)	Li Xue Yan	China	388^{+12}	China	1136^{+33}	Valentyna Goncharova	Ukraine	370	Ukraine	1079^{+14}
2nd place, silver medalist(s)	Zhao Li Li	China	377^{+13}	Russia	1110^{+21}	Ri Hyang Sim	North Korea	362	Germany	1029^{+5}
3rd place, bronze medalist(s)	Irina Izmalkova	Russia	376^{+11}	Ukraine	1101^{+14}	Liudmyla Vasylyuk	Ukraine	360	Russia	1010^{+7}
Women's 10 m Running Target Mixed
1st place, gold medalist(s)	Li Xue Yan	China	390 (=WR)	China	1158^{+36}	Valentyna Goncharova	Ukraine	371	Ukraine	1089^{+15}
2nd place, silver medalist(s)	Yang Zeng	China	386	Russia	1113^{+31}	Ri Hyang Sim	North Korea	368	Germany	1035^{+13}
3rd place, bronze medalist(s)	Su Li	China	382	Ukraine	1136^{+33}	Liudmyla Vasylyuk	Ukraine	367	Russia	1030^{+17}

== World records ==
Event	Score	Competitor	Nationality
Men's individual world records
300m Rifle Prone Men	600	Vebjørn Berg; Josselin Henry	Norway; France
Double Trap Men	196	Joshua Richmond	United States
Women's individual world records
10m Air Rifle Women	505.6	Yi Siling	China
10m Running Target Mixed Women	390	Li Xue Yan	China
Double Trap Women	115	Li Rui	China
50m Rifle Prone Women	597	Kim Yooyeon; Tejaswini Sawant; Joanna Ewa Nowakowska	South Korea; India; Poland
300m Rifle Prone Women	599	Bettina Bucher	Switzerland
Junior Men's individual world records
Double Trap Men Junior	146	Asher Noria	India
Men's team world records
Double Trap Men Team	433	United States	
25m Rapid Fire Pistol Men Team		China	
Women's team world records
Trap Women Team	211	Italy	
10m Running Target Mixed Women Team	1158	China	
50m Rifle 3 Positions Women Team	1758	United States	
300m Rifle Prone Women Team	1787	France	
300m Rifle 3 Positions Women Team	1727	Poland	
Junior Men's team world records
10m Air Rifle Men Junior Team	1174	China	
Trap Men Junior Team	361	Italy	
50m Rifle 3 Positions Men Junior Team	3478	China	
Skeet Men Junior Team	357	Czech Republic	
Junior Women's team world records
Trap Women Junior Team	202	China	
50m Rifle 3 Positions Women Junior Team	1747	United States	
50m Rifle Prone Women Junior Team	1780	Czech Republic	

== Medal count ==
* Host nation (Germany)

Rank	Nation	Gold	Silver	Bronze	Total
1	China (CHN)	21	20	11	52
2	Russia (RUS)	21	13	12	46
3	United States (USA)	11	6	7	24
4	Italy (ITA)	6	5	4	15
5	Ukraine (UKR)	5	6	12	23
6	Switzerland (SUI)	5	2	3	10
7	South Korea (KOR)	4	6	7	17
8	Germany (GER)*	3	13	5	21
9	France (FRA)	3	4	5	12
10	Poland (POL)	3	1	2	6
11	Norway (NOR)	2	4	3	9
12	Finland (FIN)	2	2	3	7
13	Czech Republic (CZE)	2	0	6	8
14	India (IND)	2	0	1	3
15	Japan (JPN)	2	0	0	2
16	Serbia (SRB)	1	4	2	7
17	Slovakia (SVK)	1	3	5	9
18	Austria (AUT)	1	3	1	5
19	Australia (AUS)	1	3	0	4
20	Denmark (DEN)	1	2	0	3
20	Hungary (HUN)	1	2	0	3
20	North Korea (PRK)	1	2	0	3
23	Sweden (SWE)	1	1	3	5
24	Belarus (BLR)	1	1	2	4
25	Brazil (BRA)	1	1	1	3
26	Great Britain (GBR)	1	0	3	4
27	Cyprus (CYP)	1	0	2	3
28	Spain (ESP)	1	0	1	2
28	Thailand (THA)	1	0	1	2
30	Mongolia (MGL)	1	0	0	1
31	Slovenia (SLO)	0	1	1	2
32	Chile (CHI)	0	1	0	1
32	Israel (ISR)	0	1	0	1
34	Kazakhstan (KAZ)	0	0	2	2
34	San Marino (SMR)	0	0	2	2
Totals (35 entries)		107	107	107	321
