= Shooting at the 2014 Asian Games – Women's 10 metre running target team =

Women's 10 metre running target team at the 2014 Asian Games
- Venue: Ongnyeon International Shooting Range
- Dates: 26 September 2014
- Competitors: 21 from 7 nations

Medalists
gold medal	China; Li Xueyan, Su Li, Yang Zeng
silver medal	Vietnam; Đặng Hồng Hà, Nguyễn Thị Lệ Quyên, Nguyễn Thị Thu Hằng
bronze medal	Qatar; Anisa Saleh Juma, Amal Mohammed, Saaida Humaid Taaeeb

The women's 10 metre running target team competition at the 2014 Asian Games in Incheon, South Korea was held on 26 September at the Ongnyeon International Shooting Range.

== Schedule ==
All times are Korea Standard Time (UTC+09:00)

Date	Time	Event
Friday, 26 September 2014	09:00	Final

== Records ==
Prior to this competition, the existing world, Asian and Games records were as follows.

World Record	China	1150	Lahti, Finland	6 July 2002
Asian Record	China	1150	Lahti, Finland	6 July 2002
Games Record	China	1146	Guangzhou, China	15 November 2010

== Results ==
Rank	Team	Slow		Fast		Total	Xs	Notes
Rank	Team	1	2	1	2	Total	Xs	Notes
1st place, gold medalist(s)	China (CHN)	291	291	283	283	1148	27	GR
	Li Xueyan	96	100	92	96	384	10	
	Su Li	97	93	97	94	381	9	
	Yang Zeng	98	98	94	93	383	8	
2nd place, silver medalist(s)	Vietnam (VIE)	281	283	274	268	1106	21	
	Đặng Hồng Hà	93	97	91	89	370	10	
	Nguyễn Thị Lệ Quyên	92	92	89	88	361	3	
	Nguyễn Thị Thu Hằng	96	94	94	91	375	8	
3rd place, bronze medalist(s)	Qatar (QAT)	271	267	268	267	1073	9	
	Anisa Saleh Juma	89	90	86	92	357	1	
	Amal Mohammed	90	86	91	92	359	6	
	Saaida Humaid Taaeeb	92	91	91	83	357	2	
4	North Korea (PRK)	267	269	264	269	1069	15	
	Jo Hyang	89	91	84	91	355	4	
	Pak Hyon-a	90	85	89	88	352	7	
	Ri Hyang-sim	88	93	91	90	362	4	
5	South Korea (KOR)	271	270	257	262	1060	20	
	Kwon Ji-eun	86	91	84	89	350	6	
	Lee Joo-hyun	93	90	90	87	360	7	
	Lim Kyeong-ah	92	89	83	86	350	7	
6	Kazakhstan (KAZ)	259	278	245	258	1040	9	
	Natalya Gurova	94	95	90	87	366	5	
	Botagoz Issenova	84	97	77	86	344	2	
	Natalya Yunusmetova	81	86	78	85	330	2	
7	Laos (LAO)	261	269	251	237	1018	15	
	Phoutsady Phommachanh	85	88	85	77	335	4	
	Hongkham Xayyalath	94	92	88	78	352	6	
	Khamla Xayyavong	82	89	78	82	331	5	
