= 2012 World Running Target Championships =

International sport shooting competition

The 2012 World Running Target Championships was held from June 3 until June 9 2012 in Stockholm, Sweden. 24 events were held.

== Medal count ==
* Host nation (Sweden)

Rank	Nation	Gold	Silver	Bronze	Total
1	Finland (FIN)	7	4	3	14
2	Ukraine (UKR)	5	6	9	20
3	China (CHN)	4	2	0	6
4	Russia (RUS)	3	4	9	16
5	Czech Republic (CZE)	3	0	1	4
6	Hungary (HUN)	1	2	2	5
7	Poland (POL)	1	1	0	2
8	Sweden (SWE)*	0	3	0	3
9	Germany (GER)	0	2	0	2
Totals (9 entries)		24	24	24	72

== Men ==
Individual			Teams			Juniors			Junior teams		
50 metre running target
1st place, gold medalist(s)	Lukasz Czapla (POL)	591	1st place, gold medalist(s)	Russia	1762	1st place, gold medalist(s)	Oleksandr Moshnenko (UKR)	584	1st place, gold medalist(s)	Ukraine	1717
2nd place, silver medalist(s)	Emil Martinsson (SWE)	590+19	2nd place, silver medalist(s)	Sweden	1752	2nd place, silver medalist(s)	Jani Suoranta (FIN)	578	2nd place, silver medalist(s)	Finland	1714
3rd place, bronze medalist(s)	Dmitry Romanov (RUS)	590+18	3rd place, bronze medalist(s)	Ukraine	1747	3rd place, bronze medalist(s)	Sami Heikkila (FIN)	573+19	3rd place, bronze medalist(s)	Russia	1676
50 metre running target mixed
1st place, gold medalist(s)	Jozsef Sike (HUN)	393	1st place, gold medalist(s)	Czech Republic	1158	1st place, gold medalist(s)	Heikki Lahdekorpi (FIN)	381	1st place, gold medalist(s)	Finland	1138
2nd place, silver medalist(s)	Emil Martinsson (SWE)	390	2nd place, silver medalist(s)	Ukraine	1154	2nd place, silver medalist(s)	Jani Suoranta (FIN)	379	2nd place, silver medalist(s)	Russia	1104
3rd place, bronze medalist(s)	Krister Holmberg (FIN)	388+20	3rd place, bronze medalist(s)	Russia	1151	3rd place, bronze medalist(s)	Sami Heikkila (FIN)	378	3rd place, bronze medalist(s)	Ukraine	1100
10 metre running target
1st place, gold medalist(s)	Dmitry Romanov (RUS)	Details	1st place, gold medalist(s)	Czech Republic	1719	1st place, gold medalist(s)	Sami Heikkila (FIN)	572	1st place, gold medalist(s)	Finland	1693
2nd place, silver medalist(s)	Lukasz Czapla (POL)		2nd place, silver medalist(s)	Ukraine	1718	2nd place, silver medalist(s)	Oleksandr Moshnenko (UKR)	564	2nd place, silver medalist(s)	Ukraine	1685
3rd place, bronze medalist(s)	László Boros (HUN)		3rd place, bronze medalist(s)	Russia	1714	3rd place, bronze medalist(s)	Vladlen Onopko (UKR)	563	3rd place, bronze medalist(s)	Russia	1623
10 metre running target mixed
1st place, gold medalist(s)	Josef Nikl (CZE)	386	1st place, gold medalist(s)	Russia	1147	1st place, gold medalist(s)	Sami Heikkila (FIN)	378	1st place, gold medalist(s)	Finland	1114
2nd place, silver medalist(s)	László Boros (HUN)	385+19	2nd place, silver medalist(s)	Ukraine	1134	2nd place, silver medalist(s)	Jani Suoranta (FIN)	377	2nd place, silver medalist(s)	Russia	1095
3rd place, bronze medalist(s)	Mikhail Azarenko (RUS)	385+18	3rd place, bronze medalist(s)	Czech Republic	1133	3rd place, bronze medalist(s)	Vladlen Onopko (UKR)	374	3rd place, bronze medalist(s)	Ukraine	1086

=== Men's medal match ===
Semifinals
(579) Bedrich Jonas (CZE)	4
(574) Lukasz Czapla (POL)	6
(579) Dmitry Romanov (RUS)	6
(575) László Boros (HUN)	4

Final
Lukasz Czapla (POL)	5
Dmitry Romanov (RUS)	6
Bronze match
Bedrich Jonas (CZE)	4
László Boros (HUN)	6

== Women ==
Individual			Teams			Juniors			Junior teams		
10 metre running target
1st place, gold medalist(s)	Yang Zeng (CHN)	Details	1st place, gold medalist(s)	China	1147	1st place, gold medalist(s)	Olena Chehovska (UKR)	368	1st place, gold medalist(s)	Ukraine	1056
2nd place, silver medalist(s)	Li Xue Yan (CHN)		2nd place, silver medalist(s)	Russia	1141	2nd place, silver medalist(s)	Veronika Major (HUN)	360	2nd place, silver medalist(s)	Russia	1017
3rd place, bronze medalist(s)	Irina Izmalkova (RUS)		3rd place, bronze medalist(s)	Ukraine	1127	3rd place, bronze medalist(s)	Mariia Kramar (UKR)	354	3rd place, bronze medalist(s)	Germany	985
10 metre running target mixed
1st place, gold medalist(s)	Su Li (CHN)	385	1st place, gold medalist(s)	China	1145	1st place, gold medalist(s)	Micaela Qvarnstrom (FIN)	362	1st place, gold medalist(s)	Ukraine	1053
2nd place, silver medalist(s)	Li Xue Yan (CHN)	382	2nd place, silver medalist(s)	Russia	1123	2nd place, silver medalist(s)	Olena Chehovska (UKR)	359	2nd place, silver medalist(s)	Germany	999
3rd place, bronze medalist(s)	Galina Avramenko (UKR)	381	3rd place, bronze medalist(s)	Ukraine	1105	3rd place, bronze medalist(s)	Veronika Major (HUN)	353	3rd place, bronze medalist(s)	Russia	992

=== Women's medal match ===
Semifinals
(390) Yang Zeng (CHN)	6
(380) Irina Izmalkova (RUS)	0
(384) Li Xue Yan (CHN)	6
(384) Olga Stepanova (RUS)	1

Final
Yang Zeng (CHN)	6
Li Xue Yan (CHN)	4
Bronze match
Irina Izmalkova (RUS)	6
Olga Stepanova (RUS)	3

== Competition schedule ==
Date	Men	Junior men	Women	Junior women
Sunday, 3 June	50 m mixed	50 m mixed		
Monday, 4 June	50 m, slow runs	50 m, slow runs		
Tuesday, 5 June	50 m, fast runs	50 m, fast runs		
Wednesday, 6 June	Rest day			
Thursday, 7 June	10 m mixed	10 m mixed	10 m mixed	10 m mixed
Friday, 8 June	10 m, slow runs	10 m, slow runs	10 m, slow runs	10 m, slow runs
Saturday, 9 June	10 m, fast runs, medal matches	10 m, fast runs	10 m, fast runs, medal matches	10 m, fast runs
