= Kim Young-min =

Kim Young-min may refer to:

- Kim Young-min (businessman) (born 1970), South Korean entertainment executive, general manager of SM Entertainment
- Kim Young-min (actor) (born 1971), South Korean actor who debuted in the 2001 film Address Unknown
- Kim Young-min (sport shooter) (born 1985), South Korean sport shooter
- Kim Se-hyun (born 1987), South Korean baseball pitcher who changed his name from Kim Young-min in 2015

== See also ==
- Kim (Korean surname)
- Young-min, a Korean given name
