= Shooting at the 2018 Asian Games – Women's skeet =

Women's skeet at the 2018 Asian Games
- Venue: Jakabaring Shooting Range
- Dates: 25–26 August 2018
- Competitors: 19 from 10 nations

Medalists
| gold medal | Sutiya Jiewchaloemmit | Thailand |
| silver medal | Wei Meng | China |
| bronze medal | Kim Min-ji | South Korea |

The women's skeet event at the 2018 Asian Games in Palembang, Indonesia took place on 25–26 August at the Jakabaring International Shooting Range.

== Schedule ==
All times are Western Indonesia Time (UTC+07:00)

| Date | Time | Event |
|---|---|---|
| Saturday, 25 August 2018 | 08:00 | Qualification day 1 |
| Sunday, 26 August 2018 | 08:00 | Qualification day 2 |
| Sunday, 26 August 2018 | 14:00 | Final |

== Records ==
Prior to this competition, the existing world, Asian and Games records were as follows.

Qualification
| World Record | Kim Rhode (USA) | 122 | Guadalajara, Mexico | 10 March 2018 |
| Asian Record | Kim Min-ji (KOR) | 120 | Tucson, United States | 12 July 2018 |
| Games Record | — | — | — | — |
Final
| World Record | Kim Rhode (USA) | 58 | Changwon, South Korea | 28 April 2018 |
| Asian Record | Wei Meng (CHN) | 55 | Astana, Kazakhstan | 11 August 2017 |
| Games Record | — | — | — | — |

== Results ==
=== Qualification ===
| Rank | Athlete | Day 1 | | | Day 2 | | Total | S-off | Notes |
| Rank | Athlete | 1 | 2 | 3 | 4 | 5 | Total | S-off | Notes |
|---|---|---|---|---|---|---|---|---|---|
| 1 | Zhang Donglian (CHN) | 25 | 24 | 23 | 25 | 24 | 121 | | AR |
| 2 | Wei Meng (CHN) | 25 | 24 | 24 | 25 | 22 | 120 | | |
| 3 | Sutiya Jiewchaloemmit (THA) | 24 | 25 | 24 | 22 | 24 | 119 | | |
| 4 | Olga Panarina (KAZ) | 22 | 24 | 24 | 24 | 22 | 116 | +2 | |
| 5 | Kim Min-ji (KOR) | 25 | 24 | 24 | 22 | 21 | 116 | +1 | |
| 6 | Eman Al-Shamaa (KUW) | 25 | 23 | 22 | 22 | 23 | 115 | | |
| 7 | Naoko Ishihara (JPN) | 21 | 22 | 23 | 24 | 24 | 114 | | |
| 8 | Assem Orynbay (KAZ) | 23 | 23 | 24 | 22 | 22 | 114 | | |
| 9 | Son Hye-kyoung (KOR) | 21 | 22 | 24 | 24 | 22 | 113 | | |
| 10 | Ganemat Sekhon (IND) | 22 | 24 | 22 | 22 | 22 | 112 | | |
| 11 | Nutchaya Sutarporn (THA) | 21 | 21 | 23 | 23 | 23 | 111 | | |
| 12 | Rashmmi Rathore (IND) | 24 | 22 | 22 | 23 | 20 | 111 | | |
| 13 | Sarah Ghulam Mohammed (QAT) | 23 | 22 | 23 | 20 | 22 | 110 | | |
| 14 | Rika Orihara (JPN) | 22 | 22 | 20 | 22 | 21 | 107 | | |
| 15 | Shaikhah Al-Rashidi (KUW) | 19 | 19 | 23 | 22 | 22 | 105 | | |
| 16 | Maryam Hassani (BRN) | 23 | 19 | 22 | 19 | 22 | 105 | | |
| 17 | Hajar Ghulam Mohammed (QAT) | 20 | 18 | 22 | 20 | 22 | 102 | | |
| 18 | Fany Febriana (INA) | 16 | 16 | 14 | 13 | 12 | 71 | | |
| 19 | Sarmunah (INA) | 14 | 9 | 13 | 12 | 12 | 60 | | |

=== Final ===
| Rank | Athlete | Elimination | | | | | | S-off | Notes |
| Rank | Athlete | 1 | 2 | 3 | 4 | 5 | 6 | S-off | Notes |
|---|---|---|---|---|---|---|---|---|---|
| 1st place, gold medalist(s) | Sutiya Jiewchaloemmit (THA) | 9 | 19 | 28 | 38 | 46 | 55 | | GR |
| 2nd place, silver medalist(s) | Wei Meng (CHN) | 8 | 16 | 25 | 35 | 44 | 54 | | |
| 3rd place, bronze medalist(s) | Kim Min-ji (KOR) | 10 | 19 | 27 | 34 | 42 | | | |
| 4 | Eman Al-Shamaa (KUW) | 6 | 16 | 24 | 32 | | | | |
| 5 | Zhang Donglian (CHN) | 7 | 15 | 22 | | | | | |
| 6 | Olga Panarina (KAZ) | 7 | 14 | | | | | | |
