= Li Yajun =

Li Yajun may refer to:

- Li Yajun (sport shooter) (born 1973), male Chinese sports shooter
- Li Yajun (weightlifter) (born 1993), female Chinese weightlifter
