= Shooting at the 2014 Asian Games – Women's skeet =

Women's skeet at the 2014 Asian Games
- Venue: Gyeonggido Shooting Range
- Dates: 27 September 2014
- Competitors: 22 from 9 nations

Medalists
gold medal	Kim Min-ji	South Korea
silver medal	Zhang Heng	China
bronze medal	Sutiya Jiewchaloemmit	Thailand

The women's skeet competition at the 2014 Asian Games in Incheon, South Korea was held on 27 September at the Gyeonggido Shooting Range.

== Schedule ==
All times are Korea Standard Time (UTC+09:00)

Date	Time	Event
Saturday, 27 September 2014	09:30	Qualification
Saturday, 27 September 2014	15:00	Semifinal
Saturday, 27 September 2014	15:00	Finals

== Records ==
Prior to this competition, the existing world, Asian and Games records were as follows.

World Record	Simona Scocchetti (ITA)	74	Granada, Spain	10 July 2013
Asian Record	Sutiya Jiewchaloemmit (THA)	73	Almaty, Kazakhstan	18 May 2014
Games Record	—	—	—	—

== Results ==
Legend

- DNS — Did not start

=== Qualification ===
Rank	Athlete	Round			Total	S-off	Notes
Rank	Athlete	1	2	3	Total	S-off	Notes
1	Zhang Heng (CHN)	24	24	24	72		GR
2	Kwak Yu-hyun (KOR)	23	24	23	70		
3	Kim Min-ji (KOR)	24	23	23	70		
4	Angelina Michshuk (KAZ)	24	21	24	69		
5	Lo Pei-yu (TPE)	23	23	23	69		
6	Sutiya Jiewchaloemmit (THA)	23	24	22	69		
7	Eman Al-Shamaa (KUW)	22	22	24	68		
8	Li Bowen (CHN)	22	22	24	68		
9	Lin Piaopiao (CHN)	22	23	23	68		
10	Son Hye-kyoung (KOR)	25	19	22	66		
11	Nutchaya Sutarporn (THA)	22	23	20	65		
12	Naoko Ishihara (JPN)	21	20	23	64		
13	Isarapa Imprasertsuk (THA)	20	22	22	64		
14	Shaikhah Al-Rashidi (KUW)	21	22	21	64		
15	Elvira Akchurina (KAZ)	22	22	20	64		
16	Reem Al-Sharshani (QAT)	21	21	20	62		
17	Zhaniya Aidarkhanova (KAZ)	20	21	20	61		
18	Afrah Bin Hussain (KUW)	18	19	22	59		
19	Deena Al-Tebaishi (QAT)	23	15	18	56		
20	Rashmmi Rathore (IND)	20	13	19	52		
—	Sarah Ghulam Mohammed (QAT)				DNS		
—	Arti Singh Rao (IND)				DNS		

=== Semifinal ===
Rank	Athlete	Score	S-off
1	Kim Min-ji (KOR)	15	
2	Zhang Heng (CHN)	14	
3	Sutiya Jiewchaloemmit (THA)	13	
4	Lo Pei-yu (TPE)	11	
5	Kwak Yu-hyun (KOR)	10	
6	Angelina Michshuk (KAZ)	9	

=== Finals ===
==== Bronze medal match ====
Rank	Athlete	Score	S-off
3rd place, bronze medalist(s)	Sutiya Jiewchaloemmit (THA)	14	
4	Lo Pei-yu (TPE)	10	

==== Gold medal match ====
Rank	Athlete	Score	S-off
1st place, gold medalist(s)	Kim Min-ji (KOR)	15	+4
2nd place, silver medalist(s)	Zhang Heng (CHN)	15	+3
