= Ding Feng =

Ding Feng may refer to:

- Ding Feng (general) (丁奉) (died 271), general of the state of Eastern Wu in the Three Kingdoms period of China
- Ding Feng (丁封), the similarly named younger brother of the general Ding Feng (丁奉)
- Ding Feng (sport shooter) (丁峰) (born 1987), Chinese professional sport shooter
