= Shooting at the 2010 Asian Games – Women's skeet team =

Women's skeet team at the 2010 Asian Games
- Venue: Guangzhou Shotgun Centre
- Dates: 23 November 2010
- Competitors: 18 from 6 nations

Medalists
gold medal	China; Wei Meng, Wei Ning, Zhang Shan
silver medal	South Korea; Kim Ae-kyun, Kim Min-ji, Kwak Yu-hyun
bronze medal	Thailand; Isarapa Imprasertsuk, Sutiya Jiewchaloemmit, Nutchaya Sutarporn

The women's skeet team competition at the 2010 Asian Games in Guangzhou, China was held on 23 November at the Guangzhou Shotgun Centre.

== Schedule ==
All times are China Standard Time (UTC+08:00)

Date	Time	Event
Tuesday, 23 November 2010	09:00	Final

== Records ==
Prior to this competition, the existing world, Asian and Games records were as follows.

World Record	China	214	Nicosia, Cyprus	5 September 2007
Asian Record	China	214	Nicosia, Cyprus	5 September 2007
Games Record	China	207	Doha, Qatar	7 December 2006

== Results ==
Rank	Team	Round			Total	Notes
Rank	Team	1	2	3	Total	Notes
1st place, gold medalist(s)	China (CHN)	70	66	65	201	
	Wei Meng	21	22	22	65	
	Wei Ning	25	24	22	71	
	Zhang Shan	24	20	21	65	
2nd place, silver medalist(s)	South Korea (KOR)	66	65	65	196	
	Kim Ae-kyun	22	21	21	64	
	Kim Min-ji	22	23	24	69	
	Kwak Yu-hyun	22	21	20	63	
3rd place, bronze medalist(s)	Thailand (THA)	64	68	64	196	
	Isarapa Imprasertsuk	22	22	19	63	
	Sutiya Jiewchaloemmit	21	23	23	67	
	Nutchaya Sutarporn	21	23	22	66	
4	Kazakhstan (KAZ)	64	57	60	181	
	Zhaniya Aidarkhanova	20	18	19	57	
	Angelina Michshuk	23	22	21	66	
	Anastassiya Molchanova	21	17	20	58	
5	North Korea (PRK)	55	60	57	172	
	Kim Hyang-sun	21	22	21	64	
	Kim Un-hye	13	19	14	46	
	Pak Kum-hui	21	19	22	62	
6	Qatar (QAT)	50	51	47	148	
	Amal Al-Rafeea	17	18	13	48	
	Deena Al-Tebaishi	18	18	17	53	
	Hanan Ali Haji	15	15	17	47	
