= Joanna Ewa Nowakowska =

Polish sport shooter (born 1989)

Personal information
- Born: 2 January 1989 (age 37)

Sport
- Country: Poland
- Sport: Shooting
- Events: 10 metre air rifle; 50 metre rifle three positions; 50 metre rifle prone
Medal record
Women's shooting
Representing Poland
World Championships
Silver medal – second place	2010 Munich	50m Rifle Prone
European Championships
Gold medal – first place	2009 Osijek	50m Rifle Prone Junior
Silver medal – second place	2009 Osijek	50m Rifle 3-Position Junior Team

Joanna Ewa Nowakowska (born 2 January 1989) is a Polish sports shooter who won a silver medal at the 2010 ISSF World Shooting Championships in the 50m Prone Rifle event, setting an equal world record. At the 2009 European Shooting Championships she became a Junior Champion in the same event.

== Career ==
Nowakowska's first international selection came in March 2007 when she represented Poland at the European 10m Airgun Championships in Deauville, France. She placed 63rd in the Junior Women's Air Rifle.

Later in 2007, she was selected to compete in Granada at the European Championships for non-air events, qualifying for the final in the 50m 3-Position rifle event and finishing sixth.

At the 2009 European Shooting Championships she became a Junior Champion in the 50m Prone Rifle event. She won silver with the Junior Women's team in the 50m 3-Position rifle event.

At the 2010 ISSF World Shooting Championships she won a silver medal in 50m Prone Rifle. Nowakowska and Indian Tejaswini Sawant equalled the world record score of 597, with Sawant claiming the gold by tie-breaking on inner-tens.
