= Young-min =

- Hangul: 영민
- RR: Yeongmin
- MR: Yŏngmin
- IPA: [jʌŋmin]

Young-min is a Korean given name.

Notable people with the name include:

== Entertainers ==
- Tim (singer) (born Hwang Young-min, 1981), American singer of Korean descent
- Aron (singer) (born Aaron Young-min Kwak, 1993), American singer of Korean descent, member of NU'EST
- Lim Young-min (born 1995), South Korean singer, former member of AB6IX and MXM
- Jo Young-min (born 1995), South Korean singer, member of Boyfriend
- Romin (born Choi Young-min, 2001), South Korean singer, member of E'LAST

== Sportspeople ==
- Lee Young-min (1905–1954), Korean football and baseball player
- Lee Young-min (footballer, born 1973), South Korean football manager and former defender (K-League Challenge)
- Hyun Young-min (born 1979), South Korean football fullback and wing (K-League Classic)
- Kwon Young-min (born 1980), South Korean volleyball player, gold medalist in volleyball at the 2002 Asian Games
- Ko Young-min (born 1984), South Korean baseball second baseman
- Kim Young-min (sport shooter) (born 1985), South Korean sport shooter
- Kim Se-hyun (born Kim Young-min, 1987), South Korean baseball pitcher

== Other ==
- Edward Young-min Kwon (born 1972), South Korean celebrity chef

== Fictional characters ==
- Kim Young-min, in 1990 South Korean film My Love, My Bride
- Ji Young-min, in 2008 South Korean film The Chaser

== See also ==
- List of Korean given names
