= 2011 Asian Shotgun Championships =

- Host city: Kuala Lumpur, Malaysia
- Dates: 21 November – 1 December 2011
- Main venue: National Shooting Range

The 2011 Asian Shotgun Championships were held in Kuala Lumpur, Malaysia between November 21 and December 1, 2011.

== Medal summary ==
=== Men ===
Event	Gold	Silver	Bronze
Trap	Mansher Singh; India	Du Yu; China	Khaled Al-Mudhaf; Kuwait
Trap team	China; Du Yu; Li Yajun; Zhang Yiyao	India; Manavjit Singh Sandhu; Mansher Singh; Anwer Sultan	Kuwait; Naser Al-Meqlad; Saud Al-Meqlad; Khaled Al-Mudhaf
Double trap	Rajyavardhan Singh Rathore; India	Mo Junjie; China	Rashid Hamad Al-Athba; Qatar
Double trap team	Qatar; Masoud Hamad Al-Athba; Rashid Hamad Al-Athba; Hamad Al-Marri	China; Li Jun; Mo Junjie; Pan Qiang	India; Mohammed Asab; Rajyavardhan Singh Rathore; Yoginder Pal Singh
Skeet	Man Singh; India	Saif Bin Futtais; United Arab Emirates	Wang Moran; China
Skeet team	India; Parampal Singh Guron; Mairaj Ahmad Khan; Man Singh	Kazakhstan; Vitaliy Kulikov; Vladislav Mukhamediyev; Alexandr Yechshenko	China; Dun Yueheng; Wang Moran; Xu Ying

=== Women ===
Event	Gold	Silver	Bronze
Trap	Lin Yi-chun; Chinese Taipei	Anastassiya Davydova; Kazakhstan	Yang Huan; China
Trap team	China; Tian Xia; Yang Huan; Yu Yingping	India; Shagun Chowdhary; Shreyasi Singh; Seema Tomar	Kuwait; Sarah Al-Hawal; Shahad Al-Hawal; Sumaiah Al-Juhail
Skeet	Yu Xiumin; China	Wei Meng; China	Nutchaya Sutarporn; Thailand
Skeet team	China; Wei Meng; Yu Xiumin; Zhang Heng	Kazakhstan; Elvira Akchurina; Angelina Michshuk; Anastassiya Molchanova	Thailand; Isarapa Imprasertsuk; Nutcha Sutarporn; Nutchaya Sutarporn

== Medal table ==
Rank	Nation	Gold	Silver	Bronze	Total
1	China	4	4	3	11
2	India	4	2	1	7
3	Qatar	1	0	1	2
4	Chinese Taipei	1	0	0	1
5	Kazakhstan	0	3	0	3
6	United Arab Emirates	0	1	0	1
7	Kuwait	0	0	3	3
8	Thailand	0	0	2	2
Totals (8 entries)		10	10	10	30
