= Varsha Varman =

Indian sport shooter (born 1994)

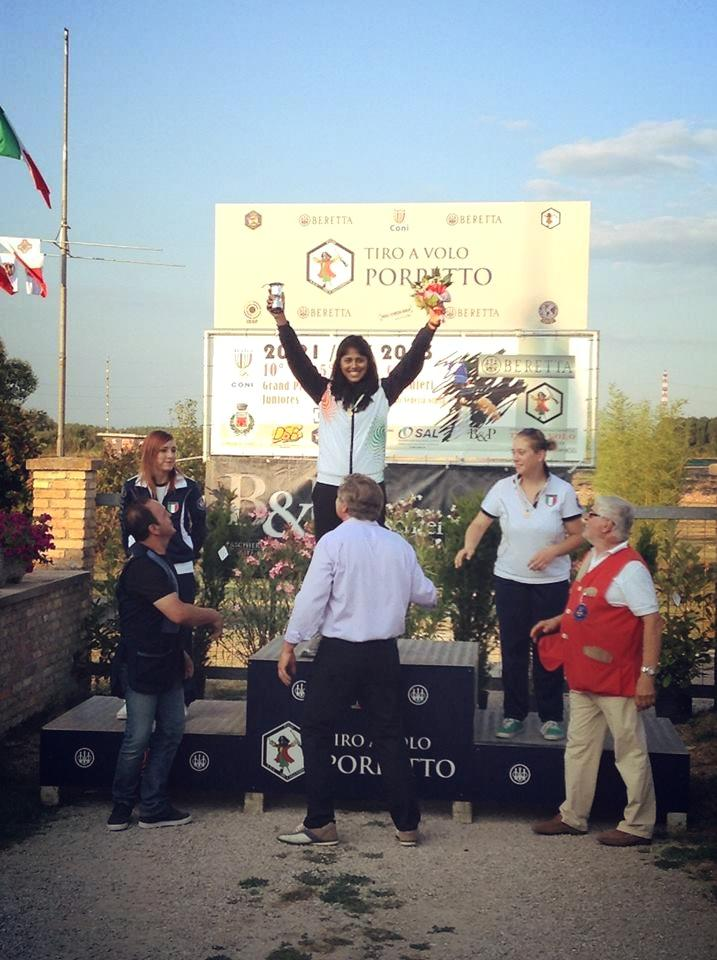
- Varsha Varman wins the Gold medal in the International Shotgun Cup, Italy

Personal information
- Nationality: Indian
- Born: 1 June 1994 (age 32) Bhopal, Madhya Pradesh, India
- Height: 1.75 m (5 ft 9 in)
- Weight: 68 kg (150 lb)

Sport
- Country: India
- Sport: Shooting
- Rank: 1
- Event: Shotgun Trap Shooting
- College team: Harvard Shooting Team.
- Club: Indian Shooting Team
- Turned pro: 2011
- Coached by: Marcello Dradi

Achievements and titles
- National finals: Ranked #1
- Highest world ranking: World Juniors #1
Medal record
Women's shooting
Representing India
Asian Games
Bronze medal – third place	2014 Incheon	Double trap team
- Updated on 1 October 2014

Varsha Varman (born 1 June 1994) is a professional Indian sport shooter. She won the bronze medal at the 2014 Asian Games at Incheon in the women's double trap team event, along with Shagun Chowdhary and Shreyasi Singh. Varman thus became the first sportsperson from Bhopal Madhya Pradesh to win a medal at the Asian Games. She is a prodigy.

Varsha studied at St. Joseph's Co-ed School, Bhopal. Varsha also ranked #1 in the Ajmer region of the Central Board of Secondary Education examinations in Class XII, and 4th in the entire country with 97.2%. She has been awarded the prestigious Eklvaya Award in 2013 and the Vikram Award in 2015 for her meritorious performances.

== Education ==
She had earlier pursued a law degree at the University of Warwick in UK, but moved to Harvard to be able to focus more on shooting. She is currently studying economics at Harvard University in the United States.
