= Khongorzul Tsagaandalai =

Mongolian sport shooter (born 1990)

Personal information
- Nationality: Mongolian
- Born: 5 June 1990 (age 36)

Sport
- Sport: Shooting
Medal record
Women's shooting
Representing Mongolia
U-20 World Championships
Gold medal – first place	2010 Munich	10 m air pistol

Khongorzul Tsagaandalai (Mongolian: Хонгорзул Цагаандалай; born 05.06.1990) is a Mongolian sport shooter. She held a winner title at the 2010 ISSF World Shooting Championships in the women's U-20 category, claiming the gold medal in the 10 m air pistol.

Khongorzul began shooting in 2007. As a child, she practiced traditional archery. Her shooting coach is Honored Athlete of Mongolia Lkhagvaagiin Undralbat.
