= Wei Meng =

Chinese sport shooter

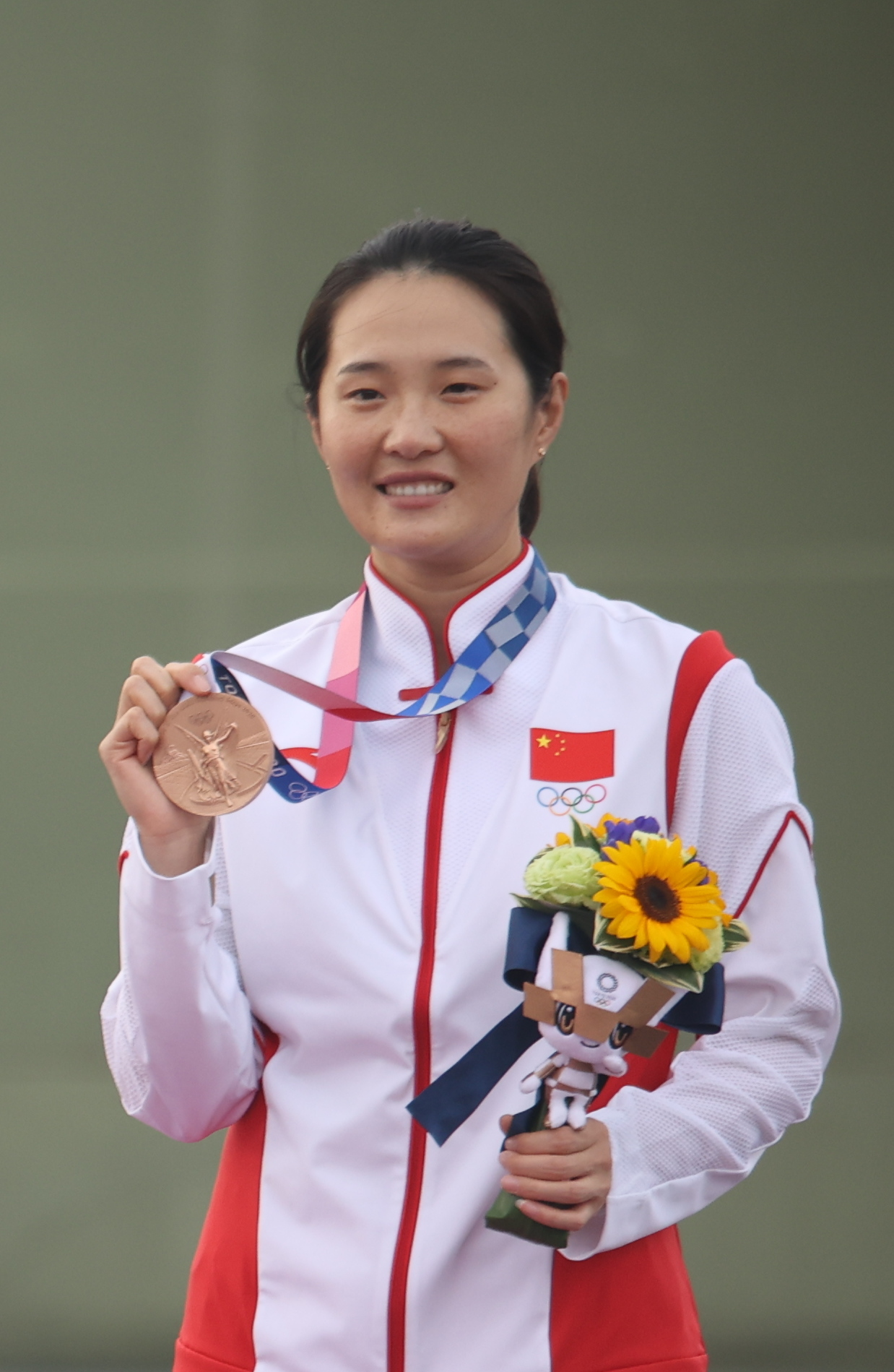
- Wei Meng wins bronze in skeet at 2020 Summer Olympic Games

Personal information
- Nationality: Chinese
- Born: 14 June 1989 (age 37) Laizhou, Shandong, China
- Height: 169 cm (5 ft 7 in)
- Weight: 57 kg (126 lb)

Sport
- Country: China
- Sport: Sports shooting
Medal record
Women's shooting
Representing China
Olympic Games
Bronze medal – third place	2020 Tokyo	Skeet
World Championships
Silver medal – second place	2019 Lonato del Garda	Skeet
Bronze medal – third place	2015 Lonato del Garda	Skeet team
Bronze medal – third place	2019 Lonato del Garda	Mixed skeet pairs
Bronze medal – third place	2019 Lonato del Garda	Skeet team
Asian Games
Gold medal – first place	2010 Guangzhou	Skeet team
Silver medal – second place	2018 Jakarta–Palembang	Skeet
Asian Championships
Gold medal – first place	2011 Kuala Lumpur	Skeet team
Gold medal – first place	2017 Astana	Skeet
Gold medal – first place	2017 Astana	Skeet team
Gold medal – first place	2019 Almaty	Skeet
Gold medal – first place	2019 Almaty	Skeet team
Gold medal – first place	2019 Doha	Skeet
Gold medal – first place	2019 Doha	Skeet team
Gold medal – first place	2023 Changwon	Skeet
Gold medal – first place	2023 Changwon	Skeet team
Silver medal – second place	2011 Kuala Lumpur	Skeet
Silver medal – second place	2015 Kuwait City	Skeet team
Silver medal – second place	2018 Kuwait City	Skeet team

Wei Meng (Simplified Chinese: 魏萌; born 14 June 1989) is a Chinese sports shooter from Laizhou. She competed in the women's skeet event at the 2016 Summer Olympics and the 2020 Summer Olympics, equalling her own world record in qualifying and getting a bronze medal in the final.
