= 2011 European Shooting Championships =

- Dates: 31 July – 14 August
- Host city: Belgrade, Serbia
- Level: Senior
- Events: 14 men + 7 women (individual); 14 men + 7 women (team)

The 2011 European Shooting Championships were held in Belgrade, Serbia.

== Men's events ==
=== Pistol ===
Event	Gold	Silver	Bronze
25m Standard Pistol	Thibaut Sauvage (FRA)	Christian Reitz (GER)	Roman Bondaruk (UKR)
25m Standard Pistol TEAM	Germany	Russia	Ukraine
25m Rapid Fire Pistol	Alexei Klimov (RUS)	Roman Bondaruk (UKR)	Christian Reitz (GER)
25m Rapid Fire Pistol TEAM	Czech Republic	Germany	Ukraine
25m Center Fire Pistol	Joao Costa (POR)	Jorge Llames (ESP)	Oleksandr Petriv (UKR)
25m Center Fire Pistol TEAM	Spain	Czech Republic	Germany
50m Pistol	Andrija Zlatić (SRB)	Leonid Ekimov (RUS)	Joao Costa (POR)
50m Pistol TEAM	Russia	Belarus	Ukraine

=== Rifle ===
Event	Gold	Silver	Bronze
50m Rifle Prone	Rajmond Debevec (SVN)	Artem Khadjibekov (RUS)	Sergei Martynov (BLR)
50m Rifle Prone TEAM	France	Germany	Denmark
50m Rifle 3 Positions	Péter Sidi (HUN)	Marco De Nicolo (ITA)	Anton Rizov (BUL)
50m Rifle 3 Positions TEAM	Norway	France	Russia

=== 300 m rifle ===
Event	Gold	Silver	Bronze
300m Standard Rifle	Josselin Henry (FRA)	Péter Sidi (HUN)	Cyril Graff (FRA)
300m Standard Rifle TEAM	France	Norway	Switzerland
300m Rifle Prone	Cyril Graff (FRA)	Anders Brolund (SWE)	Odd Arne Brekne (NOR)
300m Rifle Prone TEAM	Norway	France	Sweden
300m Rifle 3 Positions	Michael Podolak (AUT)	Péter Sidi (HUN)	Marcel Buerge (SUI)
300m Rifle 3 Positions TEAM	France	Norway	Switzerland

=== Running target ===
Event	Gold	Silver	Bronze
50m Running Target	Mikhail Azarenko (RUS)	Emil Martinsson (SWE)	Miroslav Januš (CZE)
50m Running Target TEAM	Russia	Sweden	Czech Republic
50m Running Target Mixed	Miroslav Januš (CZE)	Emil Martinsson (SWE)	Miroslav Jurco (SVK)
50m Running Target Mixed TEAM	Sweden	Russia	Finland

=== Shotgun ===
Event	Gold	Silver	Bronze
Trap	Erik Varga (SVK)	David Kostelecký (CZE)	Bostjan Macek (SVN)
Trap TEAM	Czech Republic	Russia	Italy
Double Trap	Vasily Mosin (RUS)	Richard Faulds (GBR)	Daniele Di Spigno (ITA)
Double Trap TEAM	Great Britain	Italy	Russia
Skeet	Éric Delaunay (FRA)	Tino Wenzel (GER)	Jakub Tomeček (CZE)
Skeet TEAM	Norway	Germany	France

== Women's events ==
=== Pistol ===
Event	Gold	Silver	Bronze
25m Pistol	Heidi Diethelm Gerber (SUI)	Kira Klimova (RUS)	Stéphanie Tirode (FRA)
25m Pistol TEAM	Russia	France	Bulgaria

=== Rifle ===
Event	Gold	Silver	Bronze
50m Rifle Prone	Marie Enqvist (SWE)	Michelle Smith (GBR)	Sonja Pfeilschifter (GER)
50m Rifle Prone TEAM	Sweden	Czech Republic	Germany
50m Rifle 3 Positions	Sonja Pfeilschifter (GER)	Barbara Lechner (GER)	Lioubov Galkina (RUS)
50m Rifle 3 Positions TEAM	Germany	Russia	France

=== 300 m rifle ===
Event	Gold	Silver	Bronze
300m Rifle Prone	Bettina Bucher (SUI)	Eva Friedel (GER)	Gudrun Wittmann (GER)
300m Rifle Prone TEAM	Switzerland	Germany	France
300m Rifle 3 Positions	Eva Friedel (GER)	Bettina Bucher (SUI)	Charlotte Jakobsen (DEN)
300m Rifle 3 Positions TEAM	Switzerland	Poland	—

=== Shotgun ===
Event	Gold	Silver	Bronze
Trap	Fatima Galvez (ESP)	Elena Tkach (RUS)	Delphine Racinet (FRA)
Trap TEAM	Russia	Italy	France
Skeet	Çiğdem Özyaman (TUR)	Marina Belikova (RUS)	Louiza Theophanous (CYP)
Skeet TEAM	Russia	Slovakia	Cyprus

== Men's Junior events ==
Event	Gold	Silver	Bronze
25m Pistol	Aaron Sauter (GER)	Sandro Loetscher (SUI)	Florian Fouquet (FRA)
25m Pistol TEAM	Switzerland	Russia	Germany
25m Standard Pistol	Alexander Alfirenko (RUS)	Florian Fouquet (FRA)	Oleg Barabanov (RUS)
25m Standard Pistol TEAM	Russia	Germany	France
25m Rapid Fire Pistol	Clément Bessaguet (FRA)	Alexander Alifirenko (RUS)	Oliver Geis (GER)
25m Rapid Fire Pistol TEAM	Russia	Bulgaria	France
50m Pistol	Michael Heise (GER)	Pavel Yudin (RUS)	Vincent Jeanningros (FRA)
50m Pistol TEAM	Germany	Russia	Belarus
50m Running Target	Sami Heikkila (FIN)	Vladlen Onopko (UKR)	Oleksandr Moshnenko (UKR)
50m Running Target TEAM	Finland	Russia	Ukraine
50m Running Target Mixed	Sami Heikkila (FIN)	Heikki Lahdekorpi (FIN)	Oleksandr Moshnenko (UKR)
50m Running Target Mixed TEAM	Finland	Ukraine	Hungary
50m Rifle Prone	Jaakko Bjorkbacka (FIN)	Jan Lochbihler (SUI)	Immanuel Ben Hefer (ISR)
50m Rifle Prone TEAM	Norway	Switzerland	Austria
50m Rifle 3 Positions	Ivan Yordanov (BUL)	Serhiy Kulish (UKR)	Michael Janker (GER)
50m Rifle 3 Positions TEAM	Germany	Russia	Switzerland
Trap	Carlo Mancarella (ITA)	Giulio Fioravanti (ITA)	Valerio Grazini (ITA)
Trap TEAM	Italy	Russia	Great Britain
Double Trap	Filip Praj (SVK)	Maksim Lazarev (RUS)	Artem Nekrasov (RUS)
Double Trap TEAM	Russia	Italy	—
Skeet	Alexander Zemlin (RUS)	George Kazakos (CYP)	Henri Sorvo (FIN)
Skeet TEAM	Cyprus	Italy	Denmark

== Women's Junior events ==
Event	Gold	Silver	Bronze
25m Pistol	Ekaterina Barsukova (RUS)	Anna Korakaki (GRE)	Lidia Nencheva (BUL)
25m Pistol TEAM	Russia	Czech Republic	Ukraine
50m Rifle Prone	Roxana Tudose (ROU)	Katharina Neuwirth (AUT)	Tasana Bogatinovski (SRB)
50m Rifle Prone TEAM	Austria	Sweden	Romania
50m Rifle 3 Positions	Jaqueline Orth (GER)	Jennifer Messaggiero (ITA)	Yevheniya Borysova (UKR)
50m Rifle 3 Positions TEAM	Germany	Ukraine	Austria
Trap	Ana Rita Rodrigues (POR)	Ekaterina Rabaya (RUS)	Esme Florence Sparey (GBR)
Trap TEAM	Czech Republic	Russia	Slovakia
Skeet	Iryna Malovichko (UKR)	Maria Meleshchenko (RUS)	Jitka Peskova (CZE)
Skeet TEAM	Russia	Great Britain	—

== Medal summary ==
=== Seniors ===
Rank	Nation	Gold	Silver	Bronze	Total
1	Russia	8	9	3	20
2	France	7	3	7	17
3	Germany	4	8	5	17
4	Switzerland	4	1	3	8
5	Sweden	3	4	1	8
6	Czech Republic	3	3	3	9
7	Norway	3	2	1	6
8	Spain	2	1	0	3
9	Great Britain	1	2	0	3
9	Hungary	1	2	0	3
11	Slovakia	1	1	1	3
12	Portugal	1	0	1	2
12	Slovenia	1	0	1	2
14	Austria	1	0	0	1
14	Serbia	1	0	0	1
14	Turkey	1	0	0	1
17	Italy	0	3	2	5
18	Ukraine	0	1	5	6
19	Belarus	0	1	1	2
20	Poland	0	1	0	1
21	Bulgaria	0	0	2	2
21	Cyprus	0	0	2	2
21	Denmark	0	0	2	2
24	Finland	0	0	1	1
Totals (24 entries)		42	42	41	125

=== Juniors ===
Rank	Nation	Gold	Silver	Bronze	Total
1	Russia	8	11	2	21
2	Germany	6	1	3	10
3	Finland	5	1	1	7
4	Italy	2	4	1	7
5	Ukraine	1	4	5	10
6	Switzerland	1	3	1	5
7	France	1	1	4	6
8	Austria	1	1	2	4
9	Bulgaria	1	1	1	3
9	Czech Republic	1	1	1	3
11	Cyprus	1	1	0	2
12	Romania	1	0	1	2
12	Slovakia	1	0	1	2
14	Norway	1	0	0	1
14	Portugal	1	0	0	1
16	Great Britain	0	1	2	3
17	Greece	0	1	0	1
17	Sweden	0	1	0	1
19	Belarus	0	0	1	1
19	Denmark	0	0	1	1
19	Hungary	0	0	1	1
19	Israel	0	0	1	1
19	Serbia	0	0	1	1
Totals (23 entries)		32	32	30	94
