= Shooting at the 2014 Asian Games – Women's skeet team =

Women's skeet team at the 2014 Asian Games
- Venue: Gyeonggido Shooting Range
- Dates: 27 September 2014
- Competitors: 18 from 6 nations

Medalists
gold medal	China; Li Bowen, Lin Piaopiao, Zhang Heng
silver medal	South Korea; Kim Min-ji, Kwak Yu-hyun, Son Hye-kyoung
bronze medal	Thailand; Isarapa Imprasertsuk, Sutiya Jiewchaloemmit, Nutchaya Sutarporn

The women's skeet team competition at the 2014 Asian Games in Incheon, South Korea was held on 27 September at the Gyeonggido Shooting Range.

== Schedule ==
All times are Korea Standard Time (UTC+09:00)

Date	Time	Event
Saturday, 27 September 2014	09:30	Final

== Records ==
Prior to this competition, the existing world, Asian and Games records were as follows.

World Record	Italy	215	Lima, Peru	17 September 2013
Asian Record	China	209	Almaty, Kazakhstan	3 October 2013
Games Record	—	—	—	—

== Results ==
Legend

- DNS — Did not start

Rank	Team	Round			Total	Notes
Rank	Team	1	2	3	Total	Notes
1st place, gold medalist(s)	China (CHN)	68	69	71	208	GR
	Li Bowen	22	22	24	68	
	Lin Piaopiao	22	23	23	68	
	Zhang Heng	24	24	24	72	
2nd place, silver medalist(s)	South Korea (KOR)	72	66	68	206	
	Kim Min-ji	24	23	23	70	
	Kwak Yu-hyun	23	24	23	70	
	Son Hye-kyoung	25	19	22	66	
3rd place, bronze medalist(s)	Thailand (THA)	65	69	64	198	
	Isarapa Imprasertsuk	20	22	22	64	
	Sutiya Jiewchaloemmit	23	24	22	69	
	Nutchaya Sutarporn	22	23	20	65	
4	Kazakhstan (KAZ)	66	64	64	194	
	Zhaniya Aidarkhanova	20	21	20	61	
	Elvira Akchurina	22	22	20	64	
	Angelina Michshuk	24	21	24	69	
5	Kuwait (KUW)	61	63	67	191	
	Shaikhah Al-Rashidi	21	22	21	64	
	Eman Al-Shamaa	22	22	24	68	
	Afrah Bin Hussain	18	19	22	59	
—	Qatar (QAT)				DNS	
	Reem Al-Sharshani	21	21	20	62	
	Deena Al-Tebaishi	23	15	18	56	
	Sarah Ghulam Mohammed				DNS	
