= Bettina Bucher =

Swiss sport shooter (born 1980)

Personal information
- Born: 29 November 1980 (age 45) Lucerne, Switzerland
- Height: 1.6 m (5 ft 3 in)
- Weight: 49 kg (108 lb)

Sport
- Country: Switzerland
- Sport: Shooting
- Events: 300m Rifle Prone; 300m Rifle 3-Positions
- Coached by: Roger Chassat
Medal record
Women's shooting
Representing Switzerland
World Championships
Gold medal – first place	2010 Munich	300m Rifle Prone
European Championships
Gold medal – first place	2011 Belgrade	300m Rifle Prone
Silver medal – second place	2011 Belgrade	300m Rifle 3-Position
Bronze medal – third place	2015 Maribor	300m Rifle Prone

Bettina Bucher (born 29 November 1980) is a Swiss sports shooter who specialises in the 300-metre disciplines. She became World Champion at the 2010 ISSF World Shooting Championships in the 300m Prone Rifle event, matching Charlotte Jakobsen's World Record score.

== Career ==
Bucher started competing in 2008.

In 2009 she was selected to represent Switzerland at the European Championships in Osijek, where she placed 4th in the 300m Prone Rifle event.

She was selected for the 2010 ISSF World Shooting Championships in Munich, where she became World Champion in the 300m Rifle Prone event and placed 8th in the 300m Rifle Three Position event. Her Prone score of 599ex600 matched the World Record.

At the 2010 Lapua European Cup Final, she won silver in the 300m Prone Rifle event.

At the 2011 European Championships in Belgrade, she became European Champion in the 300m Prone Rifle event and won Silver in the Three-Position event.

At the 2014 Lapua European Cup in Zagreb, she won silver in the Prone and bronze in the three-position event.

At the 2015 Lapua European Cup in Lahti, Bucher won silver in the 300m Prone Rifle event.

At the 2015 European Championships in Maribor, she won bronze in the 300m Prone Rifle event.

Current world records held in 300 metre rifle prone
Women (ISSF)	Individual	599	Charlotte Jakobsen (DEN); Bettina Bucher (SWI); Charlotte Jakobsen (DEN); Seonaid McIntosh (GBR)	21 July 2009; 9 August 2010; 23 September 2019; 24 September 2019	Osijek (CRO); Munich (GER); Tolmezzo (ITA); Tolmezzo (ITA)
