= Yang Zeng =

Chinese sport shooter (born 1987)

Personal information
- Born: 2 September 1987 (age 38)

Sport
- Country: China
- Sport: Shooting
- Event: 10 metre running target
Medal record
Women's shooting
Representing China
World Championships
Gold medal – first place	2016 Suhl	10m RT Mixed
Gold medal – first place	2016 Suhl	10m RT Women's Team
Gold medal – first place	2016 Suhl	10m RT Mixed Women's Team
Gold medal – first place	2014 Granada	10m RT Women's Team
Gold medal – first place	2014 Granada	10m RT Mixed Women's Team
Gold medal – first place	2012 Stockholm	10m RT
Gold medal – first place	2012 Stockholm	10m RT Women's Team
Gold medal – first place	2012 Stockholm	10m RT Mixed Women's Team
Gold medal – first place	2010 Munich	10m RT Women's Team
Gold medal – first place	2010 Munich	10m RT Mixed Women's Team
Silver medal – second place	2014 Granada	10m RT Mixed
Silver medal – second place	2010 Munich	10m RT Mixed
Asian Games
Gold medal – first place	2014 Incheon	10m Running Target Team
Gold medal – first place	2010 Guangzhou	10m Running Target Team
Asian Championships
Gold medal – first place	2019 Doha	10m Running Target Mixed
Gold medal – first place	2012 Doha	10m Running Target Mixed
Silver medal – second place	2012 Doha	10m Running Target
Bronze medal – third place	2012 Doha	10m Running Target

Yang Zeng (born 2 September 1987) is a Chinese sports shooter who became the World Champion at the 2012 World Running Target Championships in the 10m Running Target event. With Li Xue Yan and Su Li, she set a Women's Team World Record in the 10m Running Target Mixed event at the 2010 World Championships.

== Career ==
Zeng's first major international appearance was at the 2010 ISSF World Shooting Championships in Munich. She won silver in an all-Chinese podium. She won Gold in both the 10RT and 10RT Mixed Team events, setting a Women's Team World Record in the 10m Running Target Mixed event at the 2010 World Championships.

In November at the Asian Games, she won a silver medal in the Women's 10m Running Target Mixed event.

She won eight Gold medals across the two Women's Team events at the 2010, 2012, 2014 and 2016 World Championships.

At the 2012 World Running Target Championships she became World Champion in the 10m Running Target event.

At the 2016 World Running Target Championships she became World Champion in the 10m Running Target Mixed event.
