= Sutiya Jiewchaloemmit =

Thai sport shooter (born 1986)

Personal information
- Nationality: Thai
- Born: 3 May 1986 (age 40) Khao Chakan, Thailand

Sport
- Sport: Shooting
Medal record
Women's shooting
Representing Thailand
World Championships
Silver medal – second place	2009 Maribor	Skeet
ISSF World Cup
Gold medal – first place	2016 San Marino	Skeet
Gold medal – first place	2016 Rio de Janeiro	Skeet
Silver medal – second place	2009 Cairo	Skeet
Silver medal – second place	2015 Nicosia	Skeet
Silver medal – second place	2017 New Delhi	Skeet
Silver medal – second place	2019 Nicosia	Skeet
Bronze medal – third place	2013 Granada	Skeet
Bronze medal – third place	2016 Rome	Skeet
Bronze medal – third place	2017 Larnaka	Skeet
Asian Games
Gold medal – first place	2018 Jakarta–Palembang	Skeet
Bronze medal – third place	2010 Guangzhou	Skeet
Bronze medal – third place	2010 Guangzhou	Skeet team
Bronze medal – third place	2014 Incheon	Skeet
Bronze medal – third place	2014 Incheon	Skeet team
Bronze medal – third place	2022 Hangzhou	Skeet team
Asian Championships
Gold medal – first place	2015 Kuwait City	Skeet team
Silver medal – second place	2007 Kuwait City	Skeet
Silver medal – second place	2019 Doha	Skeet team
Bronze medal – third place	2023 Changwon	Skeet team
Asian Shotgun Championships
Gold medal – first place	2004 Bangkok	Skeet
Gold medal – first place	2008 Jaipur	Skeet
Gold medal – first place	2010 Bangkok	Skeet
Gold medal – first place	2018 Kuwait	Skeet
Gold medal – first place	2018 Kuwait	Skeet team
Silver medal – second place	2005 Bangkok	Skeet
Silver medal – second place	2007 Kuwait	Skeet
Silver medal – second place	2017 Astana	Skeet
Silver medal – second place	2019 Almaty	Skeet team
Silver medal – second place	2022 Almaty	Skeet team
Bronze medal – third place	2016 Abu Dhabi	Skeet team

Sutiya "Nee" Jiewchaloemmit (Thai: สุธิยา จิวเฉลิมมิตร; born: May 3, 1986 in Tambon Khao Chakan, Prachinburi Province (currently: Khao Chakan District, Sa Kaeo Province) is a Thai sport shooter. She competed at the 2008 Summer Olympics in Beijing, where she placed fifth in skeet. She also competed at the 2012 Summer Olympics in London, 2016 Summer Olympics in Rio, and 2020 Summer Olympics in Tokyo. She graduated with a Bachelor's Degree in Accounting and Commerce from Thammasat University
