= Shooting at the 2014 Asian Games – Women's double trap team =

Women's double trap team at the 2014 Asian Games
- Venue: Gyeonggido Shooting Range
- Dates: 25 September 2014
- Competitors: 18 from 6 nations

Medalists
| gold medal | China; Bai Yiting, Zhang Yafei, Zhu Mei |
| silver medal | South Korea; Kim Mi-jin, Lee Bo-na, Son Hye-kyoung |
| bronze medal | India; Shagun Chowdhary, Shreyasi Singh, Varsha Varman |

The women's double trap team competition at the 2014 Asian Games in Incheon, South Korea was held on 25 September at the Gyeonggido Shooting Range.

== Schedule ==
All times are Korea Standard Time (UTC+09:00)

| Date | Time | Event |
|---|---|---|
| Thursday, 25 September 2014 | 09:00 | Final |

== Records ==
Prior to this competition, the existing world, Asian and Games records were as follows.

| World Record | — | — | — | — |
| Asian Record | — | — | — | — |
| Games Record | — | — | — | — |

== Results ==
| Rank | Team | Round | | | | Total | Notes |
| Rank | Team | 1 | 2 | 3 | 4 | Total | Notes |
|---|---|---|---|---|---|---|---|
| 1st place, gold medalist(s) | China (CHN) | 76 | 81 | 78 | 80 | 315 | WR |
| | Bai Yiting | 27 | 28 | 26 | 26 | 107 | |
| | Zhang Yafei | 26 | 30 | 26 | 26 | 108 | |
| | Zhu Mei | 23 | 23 | 26 | 28 | 100 | |
| 2nd place, silver medalist(s) | South Korea (KOR) | 79 | 79 | 79 | 77 | 314 | |
| | Kim Mi-jin | 29 | 27 | 26 | 28 | 110 | |
| | Lee Bo-na | 25 | 25 | 26 | 23 | 99 | |
| | Son Hye-kyoung | 25 | 27 | 27 | 26 | 105 | |
| 3rd place, bronze medalist(s) | India (IND) | 71 | 68 | 70 | 70 | 279 | |
| | Shagun Chowdhary | 24 | 25 | 24 | 23 | 96 | |
| | Shreyasi Singh | 24 | 22 | 22 | 26 | 94 | |
| | Varsha Varman | 23 | 21 | 24 | 21 | 89 | |
| 4 | Chinese Taipei (TPE) | 69 | 70 | 65 | 64 | 268 | |
| | Hsu Jie-yu | 24 | 24 | 18 | 22 | 88 | |
| | Huang Yen-hua | 22 | 22 | 24 | 18 | 86 | |
| | Lin Yi-chun | 23 | 24 | 23 | 24 | 94 | |
| 5 | Thailand (THA) | 63 | 69 | 69 | 58 | 259 | |
| | Chattaya Kitcharoen | 25 | 24 | 24 | 23 | 96 | |
| | Vilavan Muneemongkoltorn | 21 | 20 | 21 | 15 | 77 | |
| | Nanpapas Viravaidya | 17 | 25 | 24 | 20 | 86 | |
| 6 | Kazakhstan (KAZ) | 58 | 65 | 63 | 60 | 246 | |
| | Anastassiya Davydova | 17 | 23 | 24 | 20 | 84 | |
| | Mariya Dmitriyenko | 26 | 25 | 26 | 23 | 100 | |
| | Oxana Sereda | 15 | 17 | 13 | 17 | 62 | |
