= Li Yajun (sport shooter) =

Chinese sport shooter

Medal record

Men's shooting

Representing China

Asian Championships
Gold medal – first place	2011 Kuala Lumpur	Trap team

Li Yajun (born 8 October 1973 in Guiyang, Guizhou) is a male Chinese sports shooter, who competed for Team China at the 2008 Summer Olympics.

== Major performances ==
- 1995 National Intercity Games – 1st double trap
- 2000 Asian Championships – 1st double trap
- 2001/2002/2004/2006/2007 National Shooting Series – 1st double trap

== Records ==
- 2007 National Shooting Series Leg 2 – 144, double trap (NR)
