= Pemba Tamang =

Indian sport shooter (born 1980)

Medal record

Men's shooting

Representing India

Asian Championships
Silver medal – second place	2012 Doha	25 m rapid fire pistol team
Silver medal – second place	2015 Kuwait City	25 m center fire pistol team

Pemba Tamang (born 11 March 1980) is an Indian sport shooter. He won the gold medal in the Men's 25 metre rapid fire pistol (Pairs) with Vijay Kumar and the silver medal in the Men's 25 metre rapid fire pistol at the 2006 Commonwealth Games.

The Indian trio of Pemba Tamang, Vijay Kumar and Gurpreet Singh won the silver medal in the 25m centre fire event at the 2014 Asian Games, held at Incheon, South Korea. The team scored a total of 1740, two behind gold medalists China.
