= Kang Min-su =

South Korean sport shooter

Personal information
- Born: Seoul, South Korea; 31 March 1986 (age 40)
- Height: 1.73 m (5 ft 8 in)

Sport
- Sport: Sports shooting

Kang Min-su (born 31 March 1986) is a South Korean sports shooter. He competed in the men's 25 metre rapid fire pistol event at the 2016 Summer Olympics.
