= Oleg Engachev =

Qatari sports shooter (born 1967)

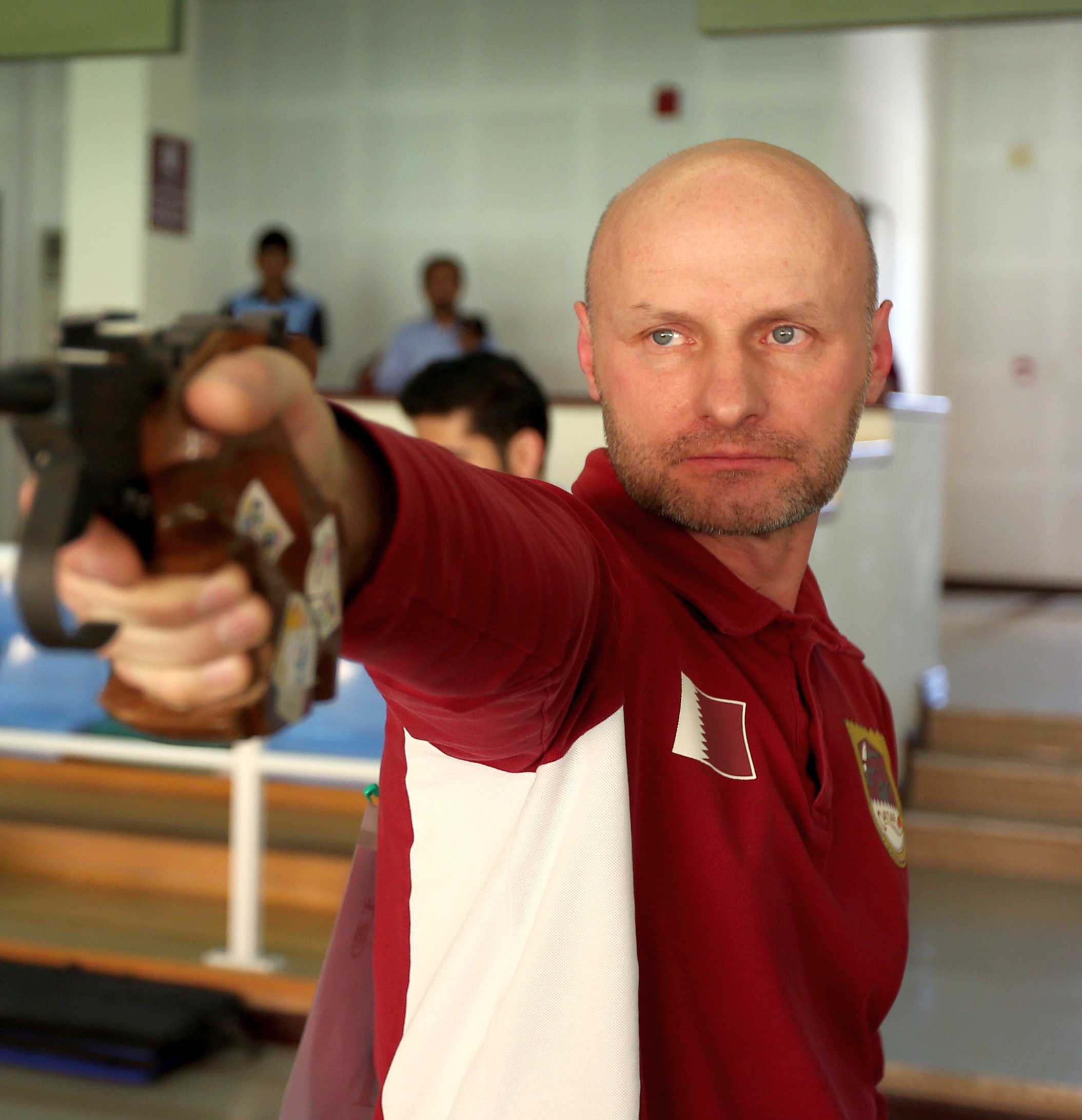
- Oleg Engachev in 2015

Personal information
- Born: 30 October 1967 (age 58) Kazan, Russian
- Height: 1.70 m (5 ft 7 in)
- Weight: 75 kg (165 lb)

Sport
- Sport: Shooting
- Club: Sport Association of Qatar
- Coached by: Nurmyrat Hanov
Medal record
Representing Qatar
Asian Games
Gold medal – first place	2014 Incheon	25 m center fire pistol

Oleg Engachev (Russian: Олег Енгачев; born 1967) is a Russian-born shooter who competes for Qatar.

== Shooting Competitions ==
In 2014 he won the 25 m center fire pistol event at the Asian Games.

== Personal life ==
Engachev is married, and has two children.
