= Kim Min-ji (sport shooter) =

South Korean sport shooter

Kim Min-Ji
Personal information
- Nationality: South Korea
- Born: 17 February 1989 (age 37) Ansan, South Korea
- Height: 1.65 m (5 ft 5 in)
- Weight: 59 kg (130 lb)

Sport
- Sport: Shooting
- Event: Skeet
- Club: Korea National Sports; University
- Coached by: Jang Kap Seok
Medal record
Women's shooting
Representing South Korea
Asian Games
Gold medal – first place	2014 incheon	Skeet
Silver medal – second place	2010 Guangzhou	Skeet
Asian Championships
Bronze medal – third place	2007 Kuwait City	Skeet team
Bronze medal – third place	2019 Doha	Skeet

Kim Min-Ji (Korean: 김민지; born February 17, 1989, in Ansan) is a South Korean sport shooter. She won a silver medal for the women's skeet shooting at the 2010 Asian Games in Guangzhou, China, accumulating a score of 89 targets.

Kim represented South Korea at the 2008 Summer Olympics in Beijing, where she competed in women's skeet shooting. She placed eighteenth in the qualifying rounds of the event by six points behind Finland's Marjut Heinonen, with a total score of 55 targets.
