= Natalya Gurova =

Kazakhstani sport shooter (born 1976)

Personal information
- Nationality: Kazakhstani
- Born: 14 August 1976 (age 49) Almaty, Kazakhstan
- Height: 1.64 m (5 ft 5 in)
- Weight: 64 kg (141 lb)

Sport
- Country: Kazakhstan
- Sport: Shooting
- Event: Running target shooting
- Club: Dinamo
Medal record
World Championships
Gold medal – first place	1998 Barcelona	10m RT
Bronze medal – third place	2002 Lahti	10m RT
World Running Target Championships
Gold medal – first place	2009 Heinola	10m RT mixed
Asian Games
Gold medal – first place	2006 Doha	10m RT team
Silver medal – second place	2002 Busan	10m RT
Silver medal – second place	2006 Doha	10m RT

Natalya Gurova (née Kovalenko; born 14 August 1976) is a female Kazakhstani sports shooter.
