= Jang Dae-kyu =

South Korean sport shooter (born 1976)

Personal information
- Nationality: South Korean
- Born: 15 October 1976 (age 49) South Jeolla Province, South Korea
- Height: 1.75 m (5 ft 9 in)
- Weight: 82 kg (181 lb)

Sport
- Country: South Korea
- Sport: Shooting
- Event: Air pistol
- Club: Seosan City Hall
Medal record
Men's shooting
Representing South Korea
World Championships
Gold medal – first place	2018 Changwon	25 m center fire pistol team
Silver medal – second place	2018 Changwon	25 m standard pistol team
Silver medal – second place	2023 Baku	25 m center fire pistol team
Bronze medal – third place	2023 Baku	25 m standard pistol team
Asian Championships
Gold medal – first place	2012 Doha	25 m rapid fire pistol
Gold medal – first place	2015 Kuwait City	25 m center fire pistol
Gold medal – first place	2015 Kuwait City	25 m center fire pistol team
Gold medal – first place	2015 Kuwait City	25 m standard pistol
Gold medal – first place	2015 Kuwait City	25 m standard pistol team
Silver medal – second place	2015 Kuwait City	25 m rapid fire pistol team
Bronze medal – third place	2012 Doha	25 m rapid fire pistol team

Jang Dae-kyu (born 15 October 1976) is a South Korean sport shooter.

He participated at the 2018 ISSF World Shooting Championships, winning a medal.
