= Kim Young-min (sport shooter) =

South Korean sport shooter (born 1985)

Personal information
- Nationality: South Korean
- Born: 5 December 1985 (age 40) Seoul, South Korea
- Height: 1.70 m (5 ft 7 in)
- Weight: 59 kg (130 lb)

Sport
- Country: South Korea
- Sport: Shooting
- Event: Air pistol
Medal record
World Championships
Gold medal – first place	2018 Changwon	25 m team center fire pistol
Silver medal – second place	2018 Changwon	25 m team standard pistol

Kim Young-min (born 5 December 1985) is a South Korean sport shooter.

He participated at the 2018 ISSF World Shooting Championships, winning a medal.
