= Jin Yongde =

Chinese sport shooter (born 1986)

Personal information
- Nationality: Chinese
- Born: 14 February 1986 (age 40)

Sport
- Country: China
- Sport: Shooting
- Event: Air pistol
Medal record
World Championships
Bronze medal – third place	2018 Changwon	25 m team center fire pistol
Asian Championships
Gold medal – first place	2012 Doha	25 m center fire pistol
Gold medal – first place	2012 Doha	25 m center fire pistol team
Gold medal – first place	2012 Doha	25 m standard pistol team
Gold medal – first place	2019 Doha	25 m center fire pistol team
Silver medal – second place	2012 Doha	25 m standard pistol

Jin Yongde (born 14 February 1986) is a Chinese sport shooter. He earned a gold medal at the 25 m standard pistol event at the 1998 Asian Games. In 2014 Jin won the 25 m center fire pistol team event at the Asian Games.

Jin is from a military family. When he was 15 years old, he joined a classmate at a shooting tryout at the Chengde Amateur Sports School (Chinese: 承德业余体校).
