= Ding Feng (sport shooter) =

Chinese sport shooter (born 1987)

Personal information
- Native name: 丁峰
- Nationality: China
- Born: March 19, 1987 (age 39) China
- Height: 175 cm (5 ft 9 in)
- Weight: 80 kg (176 lb)

Sport
- Sport: Shooting
Medal record
Men's shooting
Representing China
Olympic Games
Bronze medal – third place	2012 London	25 m rapid fire pistol
Asian Championships
Gold medal – first place	2012 Doha	25 m rapid fire pistol team

Ding Feng (Chinese: 丁峰; pinyin: Dīng Fēng; born March 19, 1987) is a Chinese sport shooter. He won a bronze medal at the 2012 Summer Olympics in the 25 metre rapid fire pistol.
