= Gurpreet Singh (sport shooter) =

Indian sport shooter (born 1987)

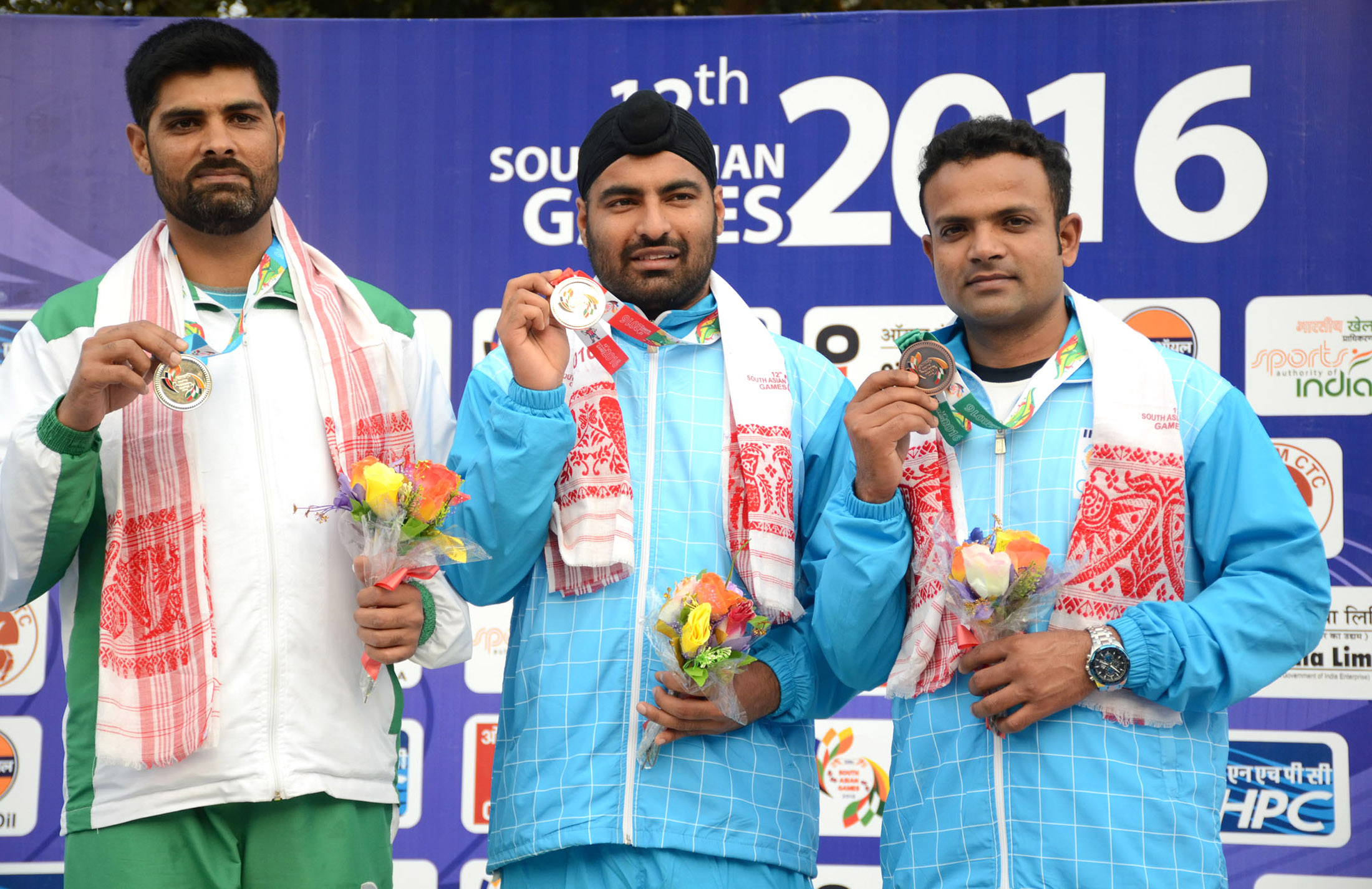
- Singh (centre) at the 2016 South Asian Games

Personal information
- Born: 19 December 1987 (age 38) Amritsar, Punjab, India
- Height: 1.75 m (5 ft 9 in)
- Military career
- Branch: Indian Army
- Rank: Subedar

Sport
- Sport: Shooting
- Events: 10m Air Pistol; 25m Rapid Fire Pistol; 25m Centre-Fire Pistol; 25m Standard Pistol
Medal record
Men's shooting
Representing India
World Championships
Silver medal – second place	2018 Changwon	25 m standard pistol
Silver medal – second place	2025 Cairo	25 m centre fire pistol
Commonwealth Games
Gold medal – first place	2010 New Delhi	25 m rapid fire pistol pairs
Gold medal – first place	2010 New Delhi	10 m air pistol pairs
Bronze medal – third place	2010 New Delhi	25 m rapid fire pistol
Asian Championships
Gold medal – first place	2019 Doha	25 m standard pistol team
Gold medal – first place	2025 Shymkent	25 m standard pistol
Gold medal – first place	2025 Shymkent	25 m standard pistol team
Gold medal – first place	2025 Shymkent	25 m center fire pistol team
Gold medal – first place	2026 New Delhi	25 m standard pistol
Gold medal – first place	2026 New Delhi	25 m standard pistol team
Silver medal – second place	2019 Doha	25 m rapid fire pistol team
Silver medal – second place	2019 Doha	25 m center fire pistol
Bronze medal – third place	2015 Kuwait City	25 m standard pistol team
Bronze medal – third place	2019 Doha	25 m center fire pistol team
South Asian Games
Gold medal – first place	2016 Guwahati and Shillong	25 m standard pistol team
Gold medal – first place	2016 Guwahati and Shillong	25 m rapid fire pistol
Gold medal – first place	2016 Guwahati and Shillong	25 m rapid fire pistol team
Silver medal – second place	2016 Guwahati and Shillong	25 m standard pistol

Gurpreet Singh (born 19 December 1987) is an Indian sport shooter who competes in pistol events. He has won multiple titles at the Asian Shooting Championships, and two ISSF World Championship silver medals. He won three medals at the 2010 Commonwealth Games in New Delhi.
