= Li Xueyan =

Chinese sport shooter (born 1985)

Personal information
- Nationality: Chinese
- Born: 15 October 1985 (age 40)

Sport
- Country: China
- Sport: Shooting
- Event: Running target shooting
Medal record
Women's shooting
Representing China
World Championships
Gold medal – first place	2018 Changwon	10 m team running target
Gold medal – first place	2018 Changwon	10 m team running target mixed
Gold medal – first place	2022 Cairo	10m air pistol team
Silver medal – second place	2018 Changwon	10 m running target
Silver medal – second place	2018 Changwon	10 m running target mixed
Asian Championships
Silver medal – second place	2012 Doha	10 m running target
Bronze medal – third place	2012 Doha	10 m running target mixed

Li Xueyan (born 15 October 1985) is a Chinese sport shooter.

She participated at the 2018 ISSF World Shooting Championships, winning a medal.
