= Shooting at the 2008 Summer Olympics – Qualification =

== Qualification rules ==
A nation may earn up to 2 quota places per event, except for women's trap and skeet, which is entitled only to a maximum of one per NOC.

The qualification consists of two parts:

- A minimum qualification score (MQS) that each shooter has to perform in at least one ISSF championship to be eligible for the Olympics in that certain event. The MQS are set rather low.
- A number of quota places in each event, adding up to a total of 390. The quota places are won by the national federations when their shooters rank high in ISSF championships (at ISSF World Cups, only the best-ranking shooter yet without a Quota place gains one, while at the World Championships there are more places at stake). Some quota places are left as wild cards.

Each quota place gives the national federation the right to send one shooter to compete in that event. However, there is a maximum of two shooters per event and country. On the other hand, a shooter filling a quota place in one event may compete in other events as well, as long as the MQS have been fulfilled. Most shooters combine events in this way (apart from those in 25 metre rapid fire pistol, skeet and women's trap, who generally do not, because there are no events similar to theirs on the program).

== Summary ==
Nation	Men									Women						Total	
Nation	FR 3x40	FR 60PR	AR 60	FP	RFP	AP 60	TR 125	DT 150	SK 125	STR 3x20	AR 40	SP	AP 40	TR 75	SK 75	Quotas	Athletes
Albania												1	1			2	1
Argentina							1									1	1
Armenia				1		1										2	1
Australia	2	2	2	2	1	2	2	1	2	2	2	2	2	1	1	26	17
Austria	2	2	2													6	3
Azerbaijan															1	1	1
Bahrain		1														1	1
Bangladesh			1													1	1
Belarus	2	2	1	2		2			1			2	2			14	8
Bolivia							1									1	1
Bosnia and Herzegovina	1	1	1													3	1
Brazil				2	1	2										5	2
Bulgaria				1		1				1	1	2	2			8	4
Canada		1					1	1				1	1	1		6	4
Chile									1							1	1
China	2	2	2	2	2	2	2	2	2	2	2	2	2	1	1	28	24
Chinese Taipei												1	1			2	1
Colombia									1							1	1
Croatia	1	1	1				1			2	2					8	4
Cuba	1	1	1		1					1	1					6	3
Cyprus									2						1	3	3
Czech Republic	2	2	1	1	2		1		1	2	2	2	2			18	13
Denmark									1							1	1
Dominican Republic									1							1	1
Ecuador												1				1	1
Egypt	1	1	1	1		1	1		1		1				1	9	9
El Salvador												1	1			2	1
Estonia									1							1	1
Fiji							1									1	1
Finland	2	2	1	1		1				2	2		1	1	1	14	8
France	2	2	1	2		2	2		1	2	2	2	2	1	1	22	13
Macedonia			1													1	1
Georgia												1	1			2	1
Germany	2	2	2	2	2	2	2		2	2	2	2	2	1	1	26	18
Great Britain	1	1	1					2						1	1	7	5
Greece									1							1	1
Guatemala									1							1	1
Hong Kong					1											1	1
Hungary	1	1	1					1		1	1	1	1		1	9	5
India	2	2	2	1		1	2	1		2	2					15	9
Indonesia											1					1	1
Ireland							1									1	1
Israel	2	2	1													5	3
Italy	2	2	2	2		2	2	2	2	1	1	1	1	1	1	22	15
Japan	1	1	1	2		2						1	1	1		10	5
Kazakhstan	2	2	2	1		1				1	1	1	1	1		13	6
Kuwait							1		2							3	3
Kyrgyzstan	1	1	1													3	1
Latvia					1											1	1
Lebanon									1							1	1
Liechtenstein			1													1	1
Lithuania														1		1	1
Malaysia					1											1	1
Malta								1								1	1
Mexico			2						1	1						4	4
Moldova					1											1	1
Monaco											1					1	1
Mongolia										1	1	2	2			6	3
Montenegro				1		1										2	1
Namibia														1		1	1
Nepal											1					1	1
Netherlands Antilles						1										1	1
New Zealand		1				1	1	1						1		5	4
Nicaragua		1	1													2	1
North Korea				2		2						1	1	1	1	8	6
Norway	2	2	2						2	2	2					12	7
Oman		1														1	1
Pakistan	1		1													2	1
Paraguay													1			1	1
Peru									1							1	1
Philippines							1									1	1
Poland	1	1	1	1		1				2	2	2	2			13	6
Portugal				1		1	1									3	2
Puerto Rico								1								1	1
Qatar									2							2	2
Romania			1		1	1			1						1	5	4
Russia	2	2	2	2	2	2	2	2	2	2	2	2	2	1	1	28	22
San Marino														1		1	1
Saudi Arabia									1							1	1
Serbia	2	2	2	1		1				1	1	1	1			12	5
Singapore							1									1	1
Slovakia	1	1		1		1	2			1	1			1	1	10	7
Slovenia	1	1	1													3	1
South Africa										1				1		2	2
South Korea	2	2	2	2		2	1			1	2	2	2	1	1	20	14
Spain		1	1				2		2			2	2			10	7
Sri Lanka				1		1										2	1
Sweden								1							1	2	2
Switzerland	2	2	1	1		1				2	2	1	2			14	8
Syria									1							1	1
Tajikistan				1		1										2	1
Thailand				1		1				2	2	1	1		1	9	5
Trinidad and Tobago						1										1	1
Turkey				1		1										2	1
Turkmenistan											1					1	1
Ukraine	2	2	2	2	2	2			1	2	2	1	1			19	12
United Arab Emirates							1	1	1							3	2
United States	2	2	2	2	1	2	2	2	2	2	2	2	2	1	1	27	22
Uruguay													1			1	1
Uzbekistan				1		1				1	1					4	2
Venezuela										1	1					2	1
Vietnam				1		1										2	1
Virgin Islands		1														1	1
Total: 103 NOCs	50	56	51	45	19	48	35	19	41	43	47	41	44	20	19	578	390

== Timeline ==
Event	Date	Venue
2005 World Cup #1	April 8–17, 2005	(South Korea) Changwon
2005 World Cup #2 Rifle & Pistol	May 7–15, 2005	(United States) Fort Benning
2005 World Cup #2 Shotgun	May 16–23, 2005	(Italy) Rome
2005 World Shotgun Championships	May 24–31, 2005	(Italy) Lonato
2005 World Cup #3 Rifle & Pistol	June 6–13, 2005	(Germany) Munich
2005 World Cup #4 Rifle & Pistol	June 13–20, 2005	(Italy) Milan
2005 World Cup #3 Shotgun	July 14–21, 2005	(Serbia and Montenegro) Belgrade
2005 World Cup #4 Shotgun	August 5–14, 2005	(Brazil) Americana
2005 American Continental Championships	November 1–11, 2005	(Puerto Rico) Salinas
2006 World Cup #1 Rifle & Pistol	March 25 – April 2, 2006	(China) Guangzhou
2006 World Cup #1 Shotgun	April 2–11, 2006	(China) Qingyuan
2006 World Cup #2 Rifle & Pistol	April 25 – May 3, 2006	(Brazil) Resende
2006 World Cup #2 Shotgun	May 4–12, 2006	(United States) Kerrville
2006 World Cup #3 Shotgun	May 16–25, 2006	(Egypt) Cairo
2006 World Cup #3 Rifle & Pistol	May 22–29, 2006	(Germany) Munich
2006 World Cup #4 Rifle & Pistol	May 29 – June 5, 2006	(Italy) Milan
2006 World Cup #4 Shotgun	June 6–15, 2006	(Germany) Suhl
2006 ISSF World Shooting Championships	July 21 – August 5, 2006	(Croatia) Zagreb
2007 African Continental Championships	March 1–9, 2007	(Egypt) Cairo
2007 European Championships 10m events	March 12–18, 2007	(France) Deauville
2007 World Cup #1 Shotgun	March 18–29, 2007	(Dominican Republic) Santo Domingo
2007 World Cup #1 Rifle & Pistol	March 31 – April 8, 2007	(United States) Fort Benning
2007 World Cup #2 Shotgun	April 13–24, 2007	(South Korea) Changwon
2007 World Cup #2 Rifle & Pistol	April 25 – May 3, 2007	(Australia) Sydney
2007 World Cup #3 Rifle & Pistol	May 3–11, 2007	(Thailand) Bangkok
2007 World Cup #4 Rifle & Pistol	May 28 – June 4, 2007	(Germany) Munich
2007 World Cup #3 Shotgun	June 6–15, 2007	(Italy) Lonato
2007 World Cup #4 Shotgun	June 26 – Jul 7, 2007	(Slovenia) Maribor
2007 European Shooting Championships	July 10–25, 2007	(Spain) Granada
2007 Pan American Games	July 13–29, 2007	(Brazil) Rio de Janeiro
2007 World Shotgun Championships	September 1–10, 2007	(Cyprus) Nicosia
2007 Oceania Continental Championships	October 27 – November 4, 2007	(Australia) Sydney
2007 Asian Continental Championships	December 5–12, 2007	Kuwait City

== 50 m rifle three positions men ==
Event	Quota places	Qualified athlete	Announced competitor
Host nation	China		Qiu Jian
2005 ISSF World Cup #1	China	Zhang Fu	Jia Zhanbo
2005 ISSF World Cup #2	Finland	Juha Hirvi	Juha Hirvi
2005 ISSF World Cup #3	Russia	Sergei Kovalenko	Sergei Kovalenko
2005 ISSF World Cup #4	Slovakia	Jozef Gönci	Jozef Gönci
2005 American Continental Championships	United States	Jason Dardas	Jason Parker
2006 ISSF World Cup #1	Norway	Vebjørn Berg	Vebjørn Berg
2006 ISSF World Cup #2	Austria	Thomas Farnik	Thomas Farnik
2006 ISSF World Cup #3	Slovenia	Rajmond Debevec	Rajmond Debevec
2006 ISSF World Cup #4	Ukraine	Artur Ayvazyan	Artur Ayvazyan
2006 World Championships	Serbia	Stevan Pletikosić	Stevan Pletikosić
2006 World Championships	United States	Matthew Emmons	Matthew Emmons
2006 World Championships	Norway	Harald Stenvaag	Espen Berg-Knutsen
2006 World Championships	Switzerland	Marcel Bürge	Marcel Bürge
2007 African Championships	Egypt	Mohamed Amer	Mohamed Amer
2007 ISSF World Cup #1	India	Sanjeev Rajput	Sanjeev Rajput
2007 ISSF World Cup #2	Serbia	Nemanja Mirosavljev	Nemanja Mirosavljev
2007 ISSF World Cup #3	France	Josselin Henry	Josselin Henry
2007 ISSF World Cup #4	Belarus	Yury Shcherbatsevich	Sergei Martynov
2007 Pan American Games	Cuba	Eliécer Pérez	Eliécer Pérez
2007 European Championships	Israel	Doron Egozi	Doron Egozi
2007 European Championships	Czech Republic	Tomáš Jeřábek	Tomáš Jeřábek
2007 European Championships	Switzerland	Beat Müller	Beat Müller
2007 Asian Championships	Kazakhstan	Vitaliy Dovgun	Vitaliy Dovgun
2007 Asian Championships	South Korea	Park Bong-duk	Han Jin-seop
Exchange of quota places	Australia		Benjamin Burge
Exchange of quota places	Italy		Niccolò Campriani
Exchange of quota places	Kazakhstan		Yuriy Yurkov
Re-allocation of unused quota	Bosnia and Herzegovina		Nedžad Fazlija
Re-allocation of unused quota	Pakistan		Siddique Umer
Athletes qualified in other events	Australia		Matthew Inabinet
Athletes qualified in other events	Austria		Mario Knögler
Athletes qualified in other events	Belarus		Vitali Bubnovich
Athletes qualified in other events	Croatia		Petar Gorša
Athletes qualified in other events	Czech Republic		Václav Haman
Athletes qualified in other events	Finland		Henri Häkkinen
Athletes qualified in other events	France		Valérian Sauveplane
Athletes qualified in other events	Germany		Maik Eckhardt
Athletes qualified in other events	Germany		Michael Winter
Athletes qualified in other events	Great Britain		Jonathan Hammond
Athletes qualified in other events	Hungary		Péter Sidi
Athletes qualified in other events	India		Gagan Narang
Athletes qualified in other events	Israel		Gil Simkovitch
Athletes qualified in other events	Italy		Marco de Nicolo
Athletes qualified in other events	Japan		Toshikazu Yamashita
Athletes qualified in other events	Kyrgyzstan		Ruslan Ismailov
Athletes qualified in other events	Poland		Robert Kraskowski
Athletes qualified in other events	Russia		Artem Khadjibekov
Athletes qualified in other events	South Korea		Park Bong-duk
Athletes qualified in other events	Ukraine		Yuriy Sukhorukov
Total			50

== 50 m rifle prone men ==
Event	Quota places	Qualified athlete	Announced competitor
2005 ISSF World Cup #1	South Korea	Han Jin-seop	Kim Hak-man
2005 ISSF World Cup #2	France	Valérian Sauveplane	Valérian Sauveplane
2005 ISSF World Cup #3	Belarus	Sergei Martynov	Sergei Martynov
2005 ISSF World Cup #4	Belarus	Petr Litvinchuk	Petr Litvinchuk
2005 American Continental Championships	Canada	Johannes Sauer	Johannes Sauer
2006 ISSF World Cup #1	Russia	Artem Khadjibekov	Artem Khadjibekov
2006 ISSF World Cup #2	United States	Thomas Tamas	Thomas Tamas
2006 ISSF World Cup #3	Hungary	Péter Sidi	Péter Sidi
2006 ISSF World Cup #4	Russia	Viatcheslav Botchkarev	Konstantin Prikhodtchenko
2006 World Championships	Ukraine	Yuriy Sukhorukov	Yuriy Sukhorukov
2006 World Championships	Italy	Marco de Nicolo	Marco de Nicolo
2006 World Championships	Austria	Mario Knögler	Mario Knögler
2006 World Championships	Switzerland	Simon Beyeler	Simon Beyeler
2007 African Championships	Egypt	Amgad Hosen	Hazem Mohamed
2007 ISSF World Cup #1	Germany	Christian Lusch	Maik Eckhardt
2007 ISSF World Cup #2	Australia	Warren Potent	Warren Potent
2007 ISSF World Cup #3	South Korea	Lee Hyun-tae	Park Bong-duk
2007 ISSF World Cup #4	Israel	Gil Simkovitch	Gil Simkovitch
2007 Pan American Games	United States	Michael McPhail	Matthew Emmons
2007 European Championships	Norway	Espen Berg-Knutsen	Espen Berg-Knutsen
2007 European Championships	Great Britain	Jonathan Hammond	Jonathan Hammond
2007 European Championships	Czech Republic	Petr Smol	Miroslav Varga
2007 Oceania Championships	New Zealand	Adrian Black	Robert Eastham
2007 Asian Championships	China	Jia Zhanbo	Jia Zhanbo
2007 Asian Championships	Oman	Dadallah Al-Bulushi	Dadallah Al-Bulushi
Exchange of quota places	Israel		Guy Starik
Tripartite Commission Invitation	Nicaragua		Walter Martínez
Re-allocation of unused quota	Bahrain		Salman Zaman
Re-allocation of unused quota	Virgin Islands		Ned Gerard
Athletes qualified in other events	Australia		Benjamin Burge
Athletes qualified in other events	Austria		Christian Planer
Athletes qualified in other events	Bosnia and Herzegovina		Nedžad Fazlija
Athletes qualified in other events	China		Qiu Jian
Athletes qualified in other events	Croatia		Petar Gorša
Athletes qualified in other events	Cuba		Eliécer Pérez
Athletes qualified in other events	Czech Republic		Tomáš Jeřábek
Athletes qualified in other events	Finland		Juha Hirvi
Athletes qualified in other events	Finland		Henri Häkkinen
Athletes qualified in other events	France		Josselin Henry
Athletes qualified in other events	Germany		Michael Winter
Athletes qualified in other events	India		Sanjeev Rajput
Athletes qualified in other events	India		Gagan Narang
Athletes qualified in other events	Italy		Niccolò Campriani
Athletes qualified in other events	Japan		Toshikazu Yamashita
Athletes qualified in other events	Kazakhstan		Vitaliy Dovgun
Athletes qualified in other events	Kazakhstan		Yuriy Yurkov
Athletes qualified in other events	Kyrgyzstan		Ruslan Ismailov
Athletes qualified in other events	Norway		Vebjørn Berg
Athletes qualified in other events	Poland		Robert Kraskowski
Athletes qualified in other events	Serbia		Stevan Pletikosić
Athletes qualified in other events	Serbia		Nemanja Mirosavljev
Athletes qualified in other events	Slovakia		Jozef Gönci
Athletes qualified in other events	Slovenia		Rajmond Debevec
Athletes qualified in other events	Spain		Luis Martínez
Athletes qualified in other events	Switzerland		Marcel Bürge
Athletes qualified in other events	Ukraine		Artur Ayvazyan
Total			56

== 10 m air rifle men ==
Event	Quota places	Qualified athlete	Announced competitor
2005 ISSF World Cup #1	United States	Jason Parker	Jason Parker
2005 ISSF World Cup #2	China	Zhu Qinan	Zhu Qinan
2005 ISSF World Cup #3	United States	Ryan Tanoue	Stephen Scherer
2005 ISSF World Cup #4	Romania	Alin George Moldoveanu	Alin George Moldoveanu
2005 American Continental Championships	Mexico	Roberto José Elias	Roberto José Elias
2006 ISSF World Cup #1	India	Gagan Narang	Gagan Narang
2006 ISSF World Cup #2	Austria	Christian Planer	Christian Planer
2006 ISSF World Cup #3	Poland	Robert Kraskowski	Robert Kraskowski
2006 ISSF World Cup #4	Germany	Frank Köstel	Michael Winter
2006 World Championships	India	Abhinav Bindra	Abhinav Bindra
2006 World Championships	Belarus	Vitali Bubnovich	Vitali Bubnovich
2006 World Championships	Russia	Konstantin Prikhodtchenko	Konstantin Prikhodtchenko
2006 World Championships	China	Li Jie	Cao Yifei
2006 World Championships	Ukraine	Oleksandr Lazeykin	Oleksandr Lazeykin
2007 African Championships	Egypt	Mohamed Abdellah	Mohamed Abdellah
2007 European Championships 10m events	Finland	Henri Häkkinen	Henri Häkkinen
2007 European Championships 10m events	Norway	Are Hansen	Are Hansen
2007 European Championships 10m events	Spain	Luis Martínez	Luis Martínez
2007 ISSF World Cup #1	Russia	Denis Sokolov	Sergei Kruglov
2007 ISSF World Cup #2	Czech Republic	Václav Haman	Václav Haman
2007 ISSF World Cup #3	Croatia	Petar Gorša	Petar Gorša
2007 ISSF World Cup #4	Germany	Tino Mohaupt	Tino Mohaupt
2007 Pan American Games	Mexico	José Luis Sánchez	José Luis Sánchez
2007 Oceania Championships	Australia	Matthew Inabinet	Matthew Inabinet
2007 Asian Championships	Kyrgyzstan	Ruslan Ismailov	Ruslan Ismailov
2007 Asian Championships	Japan	Toshikazu Yamashita	Toshikazu Yamashita
Tripartite Commission Invitation	Bangladesh		Mohammad Hossain
Tripartite Commission Invitation	Liechtenstein		Oliver Geissmann
Re-allocation of unused quota	Macedonia		Sašo Nestorov
Athletes qualified in other events	Australia		Benjamin Burge
Athletes qualified in other events	Austria		Thomas Farnik
Athletes qualified in other events	Bosnia and Herzegovina		Nedžad Fazlija
Athletes qualified in other events	Cuba		Eliécer Pérez
Athletes qualified in other events	France		Josselin Henry
Athletes qualified in other events	Great Britain		Jonathan Hammond
Athletes qualified in other events	Hungary		Péter Sidi
Athletes qualified in other events	Israel		Doron Egozi
Athletes qualified in other events	Italy		Marco de Nicolo
Athletes qualified in other events	Italy		Niccolò Campriani
Athletes qualified in other events	Kazakhstan		Vitaliy Dovgun
Athletes qualified in other events	Kazakhstan		Yuriy Yurkov
Athletes qualified in other events	Nicaragua		Walter Martínez
Athletes qualified in other events	Norway		Vebjørn Berg
Athletes qualified in other events	Pakistan		Siddique Umer
Athletes qualified in other events	Serbia		Stevan Pletikosić
Athletes qualified in other events	Serbia		Nemanja Mirosavljev
Athletes qualified in other events	Slovenia		Rajmond Debevec
Athletes qualified in other events	South Korea		Han Jin-seop
Athletes qualified in other events	South Korea		Park Bong-duk
Athletes qualified in other events	Switzerland		Simon Beyeler
Athletes qualified in other events	Ukraine		Artur Ayvazyan
Total			51

== 50 m pistol men ==
Event	Quota places	Qualified athlete	Announced competitor
2005 ISSF World Cup #1	France	Franck Dumoulin	Franck Dumoulin
2005 ISSF World Cup #2	Czech Republic	Martin Tenk	Martin Tenk
2005 ISSF World Cup #3	China	Lin Zhongzai	Lin Zhongzai
2005 ISSF World Cup #4	China	Zhang Tian	Tan Zongliang
2005 American Continental Championships	United States	Daryl Szarenski	Daryl Szarenski
2006 ISSF World Cup #1	Portugal	João Costa	João Costa
2006 ISSF World Cup #2	Russia	Mikhail Nestruyev	Mikhail Nestruyev
2006 ISSF World Cup #3	Belarus	Kanstantsin Lukashyk	Kanstantsin Lukashyk
2006 ISSF World Cup #4	Slovakia	Pavol Kopp	Pavol Kopp
2006 World Championships	Italy	Vigilio Fait	Vigilio Fait
2006 World Championships	North Korea	Ryu Myong-yon	Ryu Myong-yon
2006 World Championships	Ukraine	Oleh Omelchuk	Oleh Omelchuk
2006 World Championships	North Korea	Kim Hyon-ung	Kim Jong-su
2007 African Championships	Egypt	Samy Abdel Razek	Samy Abdel Razek
2007 ISSF World Cup #1	Switzerland	Christoph Schmid	Christoph Schmid
2007 ISSF World Cup #2	Russia	Boris Kokorev	Vladimir Isakov
2007 ISSF World Cup #3	Japan	Tomoyuki Matsuda	Tomoyuki Matsuda
2007 ISSF World Cup #4	Brazil	Stênio Yamamoto	Stênio Yamamoto
2007 Pan American Games	United States	Jason Turner	Jason Turner
2007 European Championships	Italy	Mauro Badaracchi	Francesco Bruno
2007 European Championships	Finland	Kai Jahnsson	Kai Jahnsson
2007 Oceania Championships	Australia	Daniel Repacholi	Daniel Repacholi
2007 Asian Championships	Sri Lanka	Edirisinghe Senanayake	Edirisinghe Senanayake
2007 Asian Championships	Uzbekistan	Dilshod Mukhtarov	Dilshod Mukhtarov
Exchange of quota places	Germany		Hans-Jörg Meyer
Re-allocation of unused quota	Vietnam		Nguyễn Mạnh Tường
Athletes qualified in other events	Armenia		Norayr Bakhtamyan
Athletes qualified in other events	Australia		David Moore
Athletes qualified in other events	Belarus		Yury Dauhapolau
Athletes qualified in other events	Brazil		Júlio Almeida
Athletes qualified in other events	Bulgaria		Tanyu Kiryakov
Athletes qualified in other events	France		Walter Lapeyre
Athletes qualified in other events	Germany		Florian Schmidt
Athletes qualified in other events	India		Samaresh Jung
Athletes qualified in other events	Japan		Susumu Kobayashi
Athletes qualified in other events	Kazakhstan		Rashid Yunusmetov
Athletes qualified in other events	Montenegro		Nikola Šaranović
Athletes qualified in other events	Poland		Wojciech Knapik
Athletes qualified in other events	Serbia		Damir Mikec
Athletes qualified in other events	South Korea		Jin Jong-oh
Athletes qualified in other events	South Korea		Lee Dae-myung
Athletes qualified in other events	Tajikistan		Sergey Babikov
Athletes qualified in other events	Thailand		Jakkrit Panichpatikum
Athletes qualified in other events	Turkey		Yusuf Dikeç
Athletes qualified in other events	Ukraine		Ivan Rybovalov
Total			45

== 25 m rapid fire pistol men ==
Event	Quota places	Qualified athlete	Announced competitor
Host nation	China		Zhang Penghui
2006 ISSF World Cup #1	Germany	Ralf Schumann	Ralf Schumann
2006 ISSF World Cup #2	Ukraine	Oleksandr Petriv	Oleksandr Petriv
2006 ISSF World Cup #3	Ukraine	Roman Bondaruk	Roman Bondaruk
2006 ISSF World Cup #4	China	Liu Zhongsheng	Liu Zhongsheng
2006 World Championships	Russia	Sergei Alifirenko	Leonid Ekimov
2006 World Championships	Germany	Marco Spangenberg	Christian Reitz
2007 ISSF World Cup #1	Russia	Sergei Polyakov	Alexei Klimov
2007 ISSF World Cup #2	Czech Republic	Martin Podhráský	Martin Podhráský
2007 ISSF World Cup #3	Romania	Iulian Raicea	Iulian Raicea
2007 ISSF World Cup #4	United States	Keith Sanderson	Keith Sanderson
2007 Pan American Games	Cuba	Leuris Pupo	Leuris Pupo
2007 European Championships	Czech Republic	Martin Strnad	Martin Strnad
2007 Oceania Championships	Australia	David Chapman	Bruce Quick
2007 Asian Championships	Malaysia	Hasli Izwan Amir Hasan	Hasli Izwan Amir Hasan
Re-allocation of unused quota	Latvia		Afanasijs Kuzmins
Re-allocation of unused quota	Hong Kong		Wong Fai
Re-allocation of unused quota	Moldova		Ghenadie Lisoconi
Athletes qualified in other events	Brazil		Júlio Almeida
Total			19

== 10 m air pistol men ==
Event	Quota places	Qualified athlete	Announced competitor
Host nation	China		Pang Wei
2005 ISSF World Cup #1	China	Tan Zongliang	Tan Zongliang
2005 ISSF World Cup #2	Russia	Vladimir Gontcharov	Mikhail Nestruyev
2005 ISSF World Cup #3	Russia	Vladimir Isakov	Vladimir Isakov
2005 ISSF World Cup #4	South Korea	Jin Jong-oh	Jin Jong-oh
2005 American Continental Championships	United States	Thomas Rose	Brian Beaman
2006 ISSF World Cup #1	North Korea	Kim Jong-su	Kwon Tong-hyok
2006 ISSF World Cup #2	France	Walter Lapeyre	Walter Lapeyre
2006 ISSF World Cup #3	Armenia	Norayr Bakhtamyan	Norayr Bakhtamyan
2006 ISSF World Cup #4	Bulgaria	Tanyu Kiryakov	Tanyu Kiryakov
2006 World Championships	Thailand	Jakkrit Panichpatikum	Jakkrit Panichpatikum
2006 World Championships	Ukraine	Viktor Makarov	Oleh Omelchuk
2006 World Championships	Kazakhstan	Rashid Yunusmetov	Rashid Yunusmetov
2006 World Championships	Turkey	Yusuf Dikeç	Yusuf Dikeç
2006 World Championships	Italy	Francesco Bruno	Mauro Badaracchi
2007 African Championships	Egypt	Yasser El-Assy	Mahmod Abdelaly
2007 European Championships 10m events	Poland	Wojciech Knapik	Wojciech Knapik
2007 European Championships 10m events	Ukraine	Ivan Rybovalov	Ivan Rybovalov
2007 European Championships 10m events	Germany	Artur Gevorgjan	Florian Schmidt
2007 ISSF World Cup #1	Serbia	Damir Mikec	Damir Mikec
2007 ISSF World Cup #2	South Korea	Lee Dae-myung	Lee Dae-myung
2007 ISSF World Cup #3	Belarus	Yury Dauhapolau	Yury Dauhapolau
2007 ISSF World Cup #4	India	Samaresh Jung	Samaresh Jung
2007 Pan American Games	Brazil	Júlio Almeida	Júlio Almeida
2007 Oceania Championships	Australia	Stephen Deller	David Moore
2007 Asian Championships	Japan	Susumu Kobayashi	Susumu Kobayashi
Triparte Commission Invitation	Netherlands Antilles		Philip Elhage
Triparte Commission Invitation	Montenegro		Nikola Šaranović
Re-allocation of unused quota	New Zealand		Wang Yang
Re-allocation of unused quota	Trinidad and Tobago		Roger Daniel
Re-allocation of unused quota	Tajikistan		Sergey Babikov
Athletes qualified in other events	Australia		Daniel Repacholi
Athletes qualified in other events	Belarus		Kanstantsin Lukashyk
Athletes qualified in other events	Brazil		Stênio Yamamoto
Athletes qualified in other events	Finland		Kai Jahnsson
Athletes qualified in other events	France		Franck Dumoulin
Athletes qualified in other events	Germany		Hans-Jörg Meyer
Athletes qualified in other events	Italy		Vigilio Fait
Athletes qualified in other events	Japan		Tomoyuki Matsuda
Athletes qualified in other events	North Korea		Kim Jong-su
Athletes qualified in other events	Portugal		João Costa
Athletes qualified in other events	Romania		Iulian Raicea
Athletes qualified in other events	Russia		Mikhail Nestruyev
Athletes qualified in other events	Slovakia		Pavol Kopp
Athletes qualified in other events	Sri Lanka		Edirisinghe Senanayake
Athletes qualified in other events	Switzerland		Christoph Schmid
Athletes qualified in other events	United States		Jason Turner
Athletes qualified in other events	Uzbekistan		Dilshod Mukhtarov
Athletes qualified in other events	Vietnam		Nguyễn Mạnh Tường
Total			48

== Trap men ==
Event	Quota places	Qualified athlete	Announced competitor
Host nation	China		Li Yajun
2005 ISSF World Cup #1	Italy	Giovanni Pellielo	Giovanni Pellielo
2005 ISSF World Cup #2	Australia	Adam Vella	Craig Henwood
2005 World Shotgun Championships	Italy	Massimo Fabbrizi	Erminio Frasca
2005 ISSF World Cup #3	Slovakia	Mário Filipovič	Mário Filipovič
2005 ISSF World Cup #4	Russia	Alexey Alipov	Alexey Alipov
2005 American Continental Championships	United States	Bret Erickson	Bret Erickson
2006 ISSF World Cup #1	Portugal	Manuel Silva	Manuel Silva
2006 ISSF World Cup #2	India	Manavjit Singh Sandhu	Manavjit Singh Sandhu
2006 ISSF World Cup #3	Germany	Stefan Rüttgeroth	Stefan Rüttgeroth
2006 ISSF World Cup #4	Russia	Pavel Gurkin	Pavel Gurkin
2006 World Championships	Germany	Karsten Bindrich	Karsten Bindrich
2006 World Championships	Ireland	Derek Burnett	Derek Burnett
2006 World Championships	Czech Republic	David Kostelecký	David Kostelecký
2007 African Championships	Egypt	Adham Medhat	Adham Medhat
2007 ISSF World Cup #1	United States	Lance Bade	Dominic Grazioli
2007 ISSF World Cup #2	Slovakia	Erik Varga	Erik Varga
2007 ISSF World Cup #3	India	Mansher Singh	Mansher Singh
2007 ISSF World Cup #4	Spain	Jesús Serrano	Jesús Serrano
2007 Pan American Games	Argentina	Juan Carlos Dasque	Juan Carlos Dasque
2007 Pan American Games	Canada	Giuseppe di Salvatore	Giuseppe di Salvatore
2007 European Championships	France	Yves Tronc	Yves Tronc
2007 European Championships	France	Stéphane Clamens	Stéphane Clamens
2007 European Championships	Croatia	Josip Glasnović	Josip Glasnović
2007 European Championships	Spain	Alberto Fernández	Alberto Fernández
2007 World Shotgun Championships	Australia	Michael Diamond	Michael Diamond
2007 Oceania Championships	New Zealand	Graeme Ede	Graeme Ede
2007 Asian Championships	South Korea	Lee Young-sik	Lee Young-sik
2007 Asian Championships	Kuwait	Naser Meqlad	Naser Meqlad
2007 Asian Championships	Singapore	Lee Wung Yew	Lee Wung Yew
Exchange of quota places	China		Li Yang
Tripartite Commission Invitation	Bolivia		César Menacho
Tripartite Commission Invitation	Philippines		Eric Ang
Re-allocation of unused quota	Fiji		Glenn Kable
Athletes qualified in other events	United Arab Emirates		Ahmed Al-Maktoum
Total			35

== Double trap men ==
Event	Quota places	Qualified athlete	Announced competitor
2005 World Shotgun Championships	United Arab Emirates	Ahmed Al-Maktoum	Ahmed Al-Maktoum
2006 ISSF World Cup #1	Russia	Vitaly Fokeev	Vitaly Fokeev
2006 ISSF World Cup #2	Russia	Vasily Mosin	Vasily Mosin
2006 ISSF World Cup #3	India	Rajyavardhan Singh Rathore	Rajyavardhan Singh Rathore
2006 ISSF World Cup #4	China	Hu Binyuan	Hu Binyuan
2006 World Championships	Hungary	Roland Gerebics	Roland Gerebics
2006 World Championships	Great Britain	Richard Faulds	Richard Faulds
2007 ISSF World Cup #1	Sweden	Håkan Dahlby	Håkan Dahlby
2007 ISSF World Cup #2	United States	Walton Eller	Walton Eller
2007 ISSF World Cup #3	United States	Joshua Richmond	Jeffrey Holguin
2007 ISSFWorld Cup #4	Italy	Francesco d'Aniello	Francesco d'Aniello
2007 Pan American Games	Puerto Rico	Lucas Bennazar Ortiz	Lucas Bennazar Ortiz
2007 European Championships	Italy	Daniele Di Spigno	Daniele Di Spigno
2007 World Shotgun Championships	Great Britain	Steven Scott	Steven Scott
2007 Oceania Championships	Australia	Russell Mark	Russell Mark
2007 Asian Championships	China	Pan Qiang	Wang Nan
Tripartite Commission Invitation	Malta		William Chetcuti
Athletes qualified in other events	Canada		Giuseppe di Salvatore
Athletes qualified in other events	New Zealand		Graeme Ede
Total			19

== Skeet men ==
Event	Quota places	Qualified athlete	Announced competitor
Host nation	China		Jin Di
2005 ISSF World Cup #1	United States	Vincent Hancock	Vincent Hancock
2005 ISSF World Cup #2	Italy	Ennio Falco	Ennio Falco
2005 World Shotgun Championships	United States	James Graves	Randal McLelland
2005 ISSF World Cup #3	Spain	Mario Núñez	Mario Núñez
2005 ISSF World Cup #4	Cyprus	Georgios Achilleos	Georgios Achilleos
2005 American Continental Championships	Guatemala	Juan Carlos Romero	Juan Carlos Romero
2006 ISSF World Cup #1	China	Qu Ridong	Qu Ridong
2006 ISSF World Cup #2	Norway	Tore Brovold	Tore Brovold
2006 ISSF World Cup #3	Germany	Axel Wegner	Axel Wegner
2006 ISSF World Cup #4	Germany	Tino Wenzel	Tino Wenzel
2006 World Championships	Estonia	Andrei Inešin	Andrei Inešin
2006 World Championships	Russia	Valeriy Shomin	Valeriy Shomin
2006 World Championships	Ukraine	Mykola Milchev	Mykola Milchev
2007 African Championships	Egypt	Eslam El-Deep	Franco Donato
2007 ISSF World Cup #1	Kuwait	Abdullah Al-Rashidi	Abdullah Al-Rashidi
2007 ISSF World Cup #2	Cyprus	Antonis Nikolaidis	Antonis Nikolaidis
2007 ISSF World Cup #3	Norway	Harald Jensen	Harald Jensen
2007 ISSF World Cup #4	Kuwait	Zaid Al-Mutairi	Zaid Al-Mutairi
2007 Pan American Games	Mexico	Ariel Flores	Ariel Flores
2007 Pan American Games	Peru	Marco Matellini	Marco Matellini
2007 European Championships	Spain	Juan José Aramburu	Juan José Aramburu
2007 European Championships	Italy	Valerio Luchini	Andrea Benelli
2007 European Championships	Czech Republic	Jan Sychra	Jan Sychra
2007 European Championships	France	Anthony Terras	Anthony Terras
2007 European Championships	Denmark	Anders Golding	Anders Golding
2007 World Shotgun Championships	Romania	Ioan Toman	Ioan Toman
2007 Oceania Championships	Australia	George Barton	George Barton
2007 Oceania Championships	Australia	Paul Rahman	Paul Rahman
2007 Asian Championships	Qatar	Nasser Al-Attiyah	Nasser Al-Attiyah
2007 Asian Championships	Qatar	Aziz Al-Attiya	Rashid Hamad
2007 Asian Championships	United Arab Emirates	Saeed Al-Maktoum	Saeed Al-Maktoum
Exchange of quota places	Belarus		Andrei Gerachtchenko
Exchange of quota places	Russia		Konstantin Tsuranov
Tripartite Commission Invitation	Lebanon		Ziad Richa
Re-allocation of unused quota	Chile		Jorge Atalah
Re-allocation of unused quota	Colombia		Diego Duarte
Re-allocation of unused quota	Dominican Republic		Julio Dujarric
Re-allocation of unused quota	Greece		Georgios Salavantakis
Re-allocation of unused quota	Saudi Arabia		Saied Al-Mutairi
Re-allocation of unused quota	Syria		Roger Dahi
Total			41

== 50 m rifle three positions women ==
Event	Quota places	Qualified athlete	Announced competitor
2005 ISSF World Cup #1	Germany	Melanie Neininger	Sonja Pfeilschifter
2005 ISSF World Cup #2	China	Yin Wen	Du Li
2005 ISSF World Cup #3	Germany	Barbara Lechner	Barbara Lechner
2005 ISSF World Cup #4	Czech Republic	Lucie Valová	Adéla Sýkorová
2005 American Continental Championships	United States	Kimberly Chrostowski	Sandra Fong
2006 ISSF World Cup #1	China	Liu Bo	Wu Liuxi
2006 ISSF World Cup #2	India	Anjali Bhagwat	Anjali Bhagwat
2006 ISSF World Cup #3	Russia	Lioubov Galkina	Tatiana Goldobina
2006 ISSF World Cup #4	Ukraine	Natallia Kalnysh	Natallia Kalnysh
2006 World Championships	Poland	Sylwia Bogacka	Sylwia Bogacka
2006 World Championships	Serbia	Lidija Mihajlović	Lidija Mihajlović
2006 World Championships	United States	Jamie Beyerle	Jamie Beyerle
2006 World Championships	Switzerland	Annik Marguet	Annik Marguet
2007 African Championships	South Africa	Esmari van Reenen	Esmari van Reenen
2007 ISSF World Cup #1	France	Marie Laure Gigon	Marie Laure Gigon
2007 ISSF World Cup #2	Ukraine	Olena Davydova	Dariya Sharipova
2007 ISSF World Cup #3	Slovakia	Daniela Pešková	Daniela Pešková
2007 ISSF World Cup #4	Thailand	Thanyalak Chotpaibunsin	Thanyalak Chotpaibunsin
2007 Pan American Games	Mexico	Alix Moncada	Natalia Zamora
2007 European Championships	Switzerland	Irene Beyeler	Irene Beyeler
2007 European Championships	Hungary	Anita Tóth	Anita Tóth
2007 European Championships	Italy	Valentina Turisini	Valentina Turisini
2007 Oceania Championships	Australia	Robyn van Nus	Robyn van Nus
2007 Asian Championships	South Korea	Jeong Mi-ra	Kim Yoo-yeon
2007 Asian Championships	Uzbekistan	Elena Kuznetsova	Elena Kuznetsova
Exchange of quota places	Norway		Kristina Vestveit
Re-allocation of unused quota	Venezuela		Diliana Méndez
Athletes qualified in other events	Australia		Susan McCready
Athletes qualified in other events	Bulgaria		Desislava Balabanova
Athletes qualified in other events	Croatia		Snježana Pejčić
Athletes qualified in other events	Croatia		Suzana Cimbal Špirelja
Athletes qualified in other events	Cuba		Eglis Yaima Cruz
Athletes qualified in other events	Czech Republic		Kateřina Emmons
Athletes qualified in other events	Finland		Hanna Etula
Athletes qualified in other events	Finland		Marjo Yli-Kiikka
Athletes qualified in other events	France		Laurence Brize
Athletes qualified in other events	India		Avneet Kaur Sidhu
Athletes qualified in other events	Kazakhstan		Olga Dovgun
Athletes qualified in other events	Mongolia		Zorigtyn Batkhuyag
Athletes qualified in other events	Norway		Gyda Ellefsplas Olssen
Athletes qualified in other events	Poland		Agnieszka Staroń
Athletes qualified in other events	Russia		Lioubov Galkina
Athletes qualified in other events	Thailand		Sasithorn Hongprasert
Total			43

== 10 m air rifle women ==
Event	Quota places	Qualified athlete	Announced competitor
Host nation	China		Du Li
2005 ISSF World Cup #1	China	Zhao Yinghui	Zhao Yinghui
2005 ISSF World Cup #2	Russia	Tatiana Goldobina	Lioubov Galkina
2005 ISSF World Cup #3	Czech Republic	Pavla Kalná	Pavla Kalná
2005 ISSF World Cup #4	Germany	Sonja Pfeilschifter	Sonja Pfeilschifter
2005 American Continental Championships	United States	Emily Caruso	Emily Caruso
2006 ISSF World Cup #1	Mongolia	Zorigtyn Batkhuyag	Zorigtyn Batkhuyag
2006 ISSF World Cup #2	Czech Republic	Kateřina Emmons	Kateřina Emmons
2006 ISSF World Cup #3	Italy	Elsa Caputo	Valentina Turisini
2006 ISSF World Cup #4	Croatia	Snježana Pejčić	Snježana Pejčić
2006 World Championships	Kazakhstan	Olga Dovgun	Olga Dovgun
2006 World Championships	Russia	Marina Bobkova	Olga Desyatsakaya
2006 World Championships	India	Avneet Kaur Sidhu	Avneet Kaur Sidhu
2006 World Championships	Germany	Sylvia Aumann	Barbara Lechner
2006 World Championships	France	Laurence Brize	Laurence Brize
2007 European Championships 10m events	Finland	Hanna Etula	Hanna Etula
2007 European Championships 10m events	Poland	Agnieszka Staroń	Agnieszka Staroń
2007 European Championships 10m events	Finland	Marjo Yli-Kiikka	Marjo Yli-Kiikka
2007 ISSF World Cup #1	Bulgaria	Desislava Balabanova	Desislava Balabanova
2007 ISSF World Cup #2	Croatia	Suzana Cimbal Špirelja	Suzana Cimbal Špirelja
2007 ISSF World Cup #3	Norway	Gyda Ellefsplas Olssen	Gyda Ellefsplas Olssen
2007 ISSF World Cup #4	South Korea	Lee Hye-jin	Kim Yeo-oul
2007 Pan American Games	Cuba	Eglis Yaima Cruz	Eglis Yaima Cruz
2007 Oceania Championships	Australia	Susannah Smith	Susan McCready
2007 Asian Championships	Thailand	Sasithorn Hongprasert	Sasithorn Hongprasert
2007 Asian Championships	South Korea	Kim Chan-mi	Kim Chan-mi
Exchange of quota places	Egypt		Shimaa Abdel-Latif
Exchange of quota places	Ukraine		Dariya Sharipova
Tripartite Commission Invitation	Nepal		Phool Maya Kyapchhaki
Re-allocation of unused quota	Indonesia		Yosheefin Prasasti
Re-allocation of unused quota	Turkmenistan		Yekaterina Arabova
Re-allocation of unused quota	Monaco		Fabienne Pasetti
Athletes qualified in other events	Australia		Robyn van Nus
Athletes qualified in other events	France		Marie Laure Gigon
Athletes qualified in other events	Hungary		Anita Tóth
Athletes qualified in other events	India		Anjali Bhagwat
Athletes qualified in other events	Norway		Kristina Vestveit
Athletes qualified in other events	Poland		Sylwia Bogacka
Athletes qualified in other events	Serbia		Lidija Mihajlović
Athletes qualified in other events	Switzerland		Irene Beyeler
Athletes qualified in other events	Switzerland		Annik Marguet
Athletes qualified in other events	Slovakia		Daniela Peskova
Athletes qualified in other events	Thailand		Thanyalak Chotpaibunsin
Athletes qualified in other events	Ukraine		Natallia Kalnysh
Athletes qualified in other events	United States		Jamie Beyerle
Athletes qualified in other events	Uzbekistan		Elena Kuznetsova
Athletes qualified in other events	Venezuela		Diliana Méndez
Total			47

== 25 m pistol women ==
Event	Quota places	Qualified athlete	Announced competitor
Host nation	China		Fei Fengji
2005 ISSF World Cup #1	Bulgaria	Mariya Grozdeva	Mariya Grozdeva
2005 ISSF World Cup #2	China	Chen Ying	Chen Ying
2005 ISSF World Cup #3	Serbia	Jasna Šekarić	Jasna Šekarić
2005 ISSF World Cup #4	Mongolia	Otryadyn Gündegmaa	Otryadyn Gündegmaa
2005 American Continental Championships	United States	Elizabeth Callahan	Elizabeth Callahan
2006 ISSF World Cup #1	Georgia	Nino Salukvadze	Nino Salukvadze
2006 ISSF World Cup #2	Spain	María Pilar Fernández	María Pilar Fernández
2006 ISSF World Cup #3	Italy	Maura Genovesi	Maura Genovesi
2006 ISSF World Cup #4	Bulgaria	Antoaneta Boneva	Irena Tanova
2006 World Championships	Belarus	Zhanna Shapialevich	Zhanna Shapialevich
2006 World Championships	France	Celine Goberville	Brigitte Roy
2006 World Championships	Ukraine	Olena Kostevych	Olena Kostevych
2006 World Championships	Germany	Stefanie Thurmann	Stefanie Thurmann
2007 ISSF World Cup #1	South Korea	Choi Kum-ram	Lee Ho-lim
2007 ISSF World Cup #2	Japan	Michiko Fukushima	Michiko Fukushima
2007 ISSF World Cup #3	Hungary	Zsófia Csonka	Zsófia Csonka
2007 ISSF World Cup #4	Russia	Galina Belyayeva	Yuliya Alipava
2007 Pan American Games	United States	Sandra Uptagrafft	Rebecca Snyder
2007 European Championships	Albania	Lindita Kodra	Lindita Kodra
2007 European Championships	France	Stéphanie Tirode	Stéphanie Tirode
2007 European Championships	Czech Republic	Petra Hyková	Michaela Musilová
2007 Oceania Championships	Australia	Linda Ryan	Dina Aspandiyarova
2007 Asian Championships	Thailand	Tanyaporn Prucksakorn	Tanyaporn Prucksakorn
2007 Asian Championships	South Korea	Kang Eun-ra	Ahn Soo-kyeong
Exchange of quota places	Poland		Sławomira Szpek
Re-allocation of unused quota	Ecuador		Carmen Malo
Athletes qualified in other events	Australia		Lalita Yauhleuskaya
Athletes qualified in other events	Belarus		Viktoria Chaika
Athletes qualified in other events	Canada		Avianna Chao
Athletes qualified in other events	Czech Republic		Lenka Marušková
Athletes qualified in other events	El Salvador		Luisa Maida
Athletes qualified in other events	Spain		Sonia Franquet
Athletes qualified in other events	France		Brigitte Roy
Athletes qualified in other events	Germany		Munkhbayar Dorjsuren
Athletes qualified in other events	Kazakhstan		Zauresh Baibussinova
Athletes qualified in other events	Mongolia		Tsogbadrakhyn Mönkhzul
Athletes qualified in other events	Poland		Mirosława Sagun-Lewandowska
Athletes qualified in other events	North Korea		Jo Yong-suk
Athletes qualified in other events	Russia		Natalia Paderina
Athletes qualified in other events	Switzerland		Sandra Kolly
Athletes qualified in other events	Chinese Taipei		Huang Yi-ling
Total			41

== 10 m air pistol women ==
Event	Quota places	Qualified athlete	Announced competitor
2005 ISSF World Cup #1	Australia	Lalita Yauhleuskaya	Lalita Yauhleuskaya
2005 ISSF World Cup #2	Belarus	Viktoria Chaika	Viktoria Chaika
2005 ISSF World Cup #3	South Korea	Park Nam-suk	Kim Yun-mi
2005 ISSF World Cup #4	South Korea	Lee Ho-lim	Lee Ho-lim
2005 American Continental Championships	United States	Rebecca Snyder	Brenda Shinn
2006 ISSF World Cup #1	China	Ren Jie	Ren Jie
2006 ISSF World Cup #2	China	Sun Rongli	Guo Wenjun
2006 ISSF World Cup #3	Germany	Munkhbayar Dorjsuren	Munkhbayar Dorjsuren
2006 ISSF World Cup #4	Switzerland	Sandra Kolly	Sandra Kolly
2006 World Championships	Russia	Natalia Paderina	Natalia Paderina
2006 World Championships	Australia	Dina Aspandiyarova	Dina Aspandiyarova
2006 World Championships	Mongolia	Tsogbadrakhyn Mönkhzul	Tsogbadrakhyn Mönkhzul
2006 World Championships	Czech Republic	Lenka Marušková	Lenka Marušková
2006 World Championships	Belarus	Liudmila Chabatar	Zhanna Shapialevich
2007 European Championships 10m events	Germany	Claudia Verdicchio	Claudia Verdicchio
2007 European Championships 10m events	Finland	Mira Nevansuu	Mira Nevansuu
2007 European Championships 10m events	Spain	Sonia Franquet	Sonia Franquet
2007 ISSF World Cup #1	Kazakhstan	Zauresh Baibussinova	Zauresh Baibussinova
2007 ISSF World Cup #2	Poland	Mirosława Sagun-Lewandowska	Mirosława Sagun-Lewandowska
2007 ISSF World Cup #3	Russia	Olga Kuznetsova	Svetlana Smirnova
2007 ISSF World Cup #4	Switzerland	Angela Schuler	Cornelia Frölich
2007 Pan American Games	Canada	Avianna Chao	Avianna Chao
2007 Asian Championships	North Korea	Jo Yong-suk	Jo Yong-suk
2007 Asian Championships	Chinese Taipei	Huang Yi-ling	Huang Yi-ling
Exchange of quota places	France		Brigitte Roy
Re-allocation of unused quota	Uruguay		Carolina Lozado
Tripartite Commission Invitation	El Salvador		Luisa Maida
Tripartite Commission Invitation	Paraguay		Patricia Wilka
Athletes qualified in other events	Albania		Lindita Kodra
Athletes qualified in other events	Bulgaria		Mariya Grozdeva
Athletes qualified in other events	Bulgaria		Irena Tanova
Athletes qualified in other events	Czech Republic		Michaela Musilová
Athletes qualified in other events	Spain		María Pilar Fernández
Athletes qualified in other events	France		Stéphanie Tirode
Athletes qualified in other events	Georgia		Nino Salukvadze
Athletes qualified in other events	Hungary		Zsófia Csonka
Athletes qualified in other events	Italy		Maura Genovesi
Athletes qualified in other events	Japan		Michiko Fukushima
Athletes qualified in other events	Mongolia		Otryadyn Gündegmaa
Athletes qualified in other events	Poland		Sławomira Szpek
Athletes qualified in other events	Serbia		Jasna Šekarić
Athletes qualified in other events	Thailand		Tanyaporn Prucksakorn
Athletes qualified in other events	Ukraine		Olena Kostevych
Athletes qualified in other events	United States		Rebecca Snyder
Total			44

== Trap women ==
Event	Quota places	Qualified athlete	Announced competitor
Host nation	China		Liu Yingzi
2005 World Shotgun Championships	Italy	Deborah Gelisio	Deborah Gelisio
2005 American Continental Championships	Canada	Sandra Honour	Susan Nattrass
2006 ISSF World Cup #1	Slovakia	Zuzana Štefečeková	Zuzana Štefečeková
2006 ISSF World Cup #2	United States	Theresa Dewitt	Corey Cogdell
2006 ISSF World Cup #3	Germany	Susanne Kiermayer	Susanne Kiermayer
2006 ISSF World Cup #4	Finland	Satu Mäkelä-Nummela	Satu Mäkelä-Nummela
2006 World Championships	North Korea	Chae Hye-gyong	Pak Yong-hui
2006 World Championships	Great Britain	Lesley Goddard	Charlotte Kerwood
2007 African Championships	South Africa	Diane Swanton	Diane Swanton
2007 ISSF World Cup #1	France	Delphine Racinet	Delphine Racinet
2007 ISSF World Cup #2	Japan	Yukie Nakayama	Yukie Nakayama
2007 ISSF World Cup #3	San Marino	Daniela Del Din	Daniela Del Din
2007 ISSF World Cup #4	Australia	Suzanne Balogh	Stacy Roiall
2007 World Shotgun Championships	Lithuania	Daina Gudzinevičiūtė	Daina Gudzinevičiūtė
2007 European Championships	Russia	Elena Tkach	Irina Laricheva
2007 Oceania Championships	New Zealand	Natalie Rooney	Nadine Stanton
2007 Asian Championships	Kazakhstan	Elena Struchaeva	Elena Struchaeva
Exchange of quota places	South Korea		Lee Bo-na
Tripartite Commission Invitation	Namibia		Gaby Ahrens
Total			20

== Skeet women ==
Event	Quota places	Qualified athlete	Announced competitor
Host nation	China		Wei Ning
2005 World Shotgun Championships	France	Véronique Girardet	Véronique Girardet
2005 American Continental Championships	United States	Haley Dunn	Kimberly Rhode
2006 ISSF World Cup #1	Germany	Christine Brinker	Christine Brinker
2006 ISSF World Cup #2	Russia	Svetlana Demina	Svetlana Demina
2006 ISSF World Cup #3	Slovakia	Danka Barteková	Danka Barteková
2006 ISSF World Cup #4	Cyprus	Andri Eleftheriou	Andri Eleftheriou
2006 World Championships	Italy	Chiara Cainero	Chiara Cainero
2006 World Championships	Great Britain	Elena Little	Elena Little
2007 African Championships	Egypt	Mona El-Hawary	Mona El-Hawary
2007 ISSF World Cup #1	Sweden	Nathalie Larsson	Nathalie Larsson
2007 ISSF World Cup #2	South Korea	Kim Min-ji	Kim Min-ji
2007 ISSF World Cup #3	Hungary	Diána Igaly	Diána Igaly
2007 ISSF World Cup #4	Finland	Marjut Heinonen	Marjut Heinonen
2007 World Shotgun Championships	Thailand	Sutiya Jiewchaloemmit	Sutiya Jiewchaloemmit
2007 European Championships	Romania	Lucia Mihalache	Lucia Mihalache
2007 Asian Championships	North Korea	Pak Jong-ran	Pak Jong-ran
2007 Oceania Championships	Australia	Lauryn Mark	Natalia Rahman
Re-allocation of unused quota	Azerbaijan		Zemfira Meftahatdinova
Total			19
