= Shooting at the 2008 Summer Olympics – Women's 25 metre pistol =

Women's 25 metre pistol at the Games of the XXIX Olympiad
- Venue: Beijing Shooting Range Hall
- Date: August 13, 2008
- Competitors: 41 from 28 nations
- Winning score: 793.4 (OR)

Medalists
1st place, gold medalist(s)		Chen Ying	China
2nd place, silver medalist(s)		Otryadyn Gündegmaa	Mongolia
3rd place, bronze medalist(s)		Munkhbayar Dorjsuren	Germany

The Women's 25 metre pistol event at the 2008 Olympic Games took place on August 13 at the Beijing Shooting Range Hall. It was won by the reigning World champion, Chen Ying of the host nation, while Otryadyn Gündegmaa won Mongolia's second Olympic medal in shooting ahead of Munkhbayar Dorjsuren who won its first, 16 years earlier, but now competes for Germany.

The event consisted of two rounds: a qualifier and a final. In the qualifier, each shooter fired 60 shots with a pistol at 25 metres distance. Scores for each shot were in increments of 1, with a maximum score of 10. The first 30 shots were in the precision stage, with series of 5 shots being shot within 5 minutes. The second set of 30 shots gave shooters 3 seconds to take each shot.

The top 8 shooters in the qualifying round moved on to the final round. There, they fired an additional 20 shots. These shots scored in increments of .1, with a maximum score of 10.9. They were fired in four sets of 5 rapid fire shots. The total score from all 80 shots was used to determine final ranking.

== Records ==
Prior to this competition, the existing world and Olympic records were as follows.

Qualification records
World record	Diana Iorgova (BUL); Tao Luna (CHN)	594	Milan, Italy; Munich, Germany	31 May 1994; 23 August 2002
Olympic record	Tao Luna (CHN)	590	Sydney, Australia	22 September 2000

Final records
World record	Mariya Grozdeva (BUL)	796.7 (591+205.7)	Changwon, South Korea	11 April 2005
Olympic record	ISSF Rule changed on 01.01.2005	–	–	–

== Qualification round ==
The precision stage was fired at 09:00 China Standard Time (UTC+8), with all participants fitting into a single relay. In this stage, the time limit for each five-shot string is five minutes. Sonia Franquet of Spain took a two-point lead.

The rapid fire stage was fired at 12:00, with all participants fitting into a single relay. In this stage, the shooter must fire one shot each within three-second time frames, and the arm must be held at a 45-degree angle until the lights turn green, signalling the beginning of these time frames. To compensate for the shorter time, the score zones are larger than in the precision round. Mongolia's Otryadyn Gündegmaa shot 29 tens and only 1 nine, taking the overall lead and equalling the Olympic record for the qualification round that Tao Luna had set in Sydney (as opposed to Gündegmaa's 291+299, Tao had shot her record 299+291).

Rank	Athlete	Country	1	2	3	PR	4	5	6	RF	Total	Notes
1	Otryadyn Gündegmaa	Mongolia	97	96	98	291	100	100	99	299	590	Q EOR
2	Munkhbayar Dorjsuren	Germany	97	97	98	292	98	98	99	295	587	Q
3	Chen Ying	China	96	95	100	291	98	98	98	294	585	Q
4	Jo Yong-suk	North Korea	98	94	97	289	98	99	98	295	584	Q
5	Mariya Grozdeva	Bulgaria	97	95	95	287	100	97	99	296	583	Q
6	Luisa Maida	El Salvador	99	96	97	292	96	97	97	290	582	Q
7	Fei Fengji	China	95	99	98	292	97	96	97	290	582	Q
8	Tanyaporn Prucksakorn	Thailand	98	96	97	291	97	99	95	291	582	Q
9	Sonia Franquet	Spain	97	98	99	294	97	96	95	288	582	
10	Michiko Fukushima	Japan	95	96	97	288	97	97	99	293	581	
11	Ahn Soo-kyeong	South Korea	97	95	96	288	97	98	98	293	581	
12	Tsogbadrakhyn Mönkhzul	Mongolia	95	98	97	290	97	96	98	291	581	
13	Viktoria Chaika	Belarus	97	99	96	292	96	95	98	289	581	
14	Lalita Yauhleuskaya	Australia	97	96	97	290	98	98	95	291	581	
15	Brigitte Roy	France	96	97	96	289	95	97	99	291	580	
16	Nino Salukvadze	Georgia	96	98	98	292	95	95	98	288	580	
17	Lee Ho-lim	South Korea	98	95	96	289	98	97	96	291	580	
18	Yuliya Alipava	Russia	97	96	94	287	98	95	99	292	579	
19	Natalia Paderina	Russia	96	97	99	292	97	94	96	287	579	
20	Lenka Marušková	Czech Republic	97	97	92	286	94	99	99	292	578	
21	Jasna Šekarić	Serbia	96	95	94	285	99	98	96	293	578	
22	Stéphanie Tirode	France	98	96	97	291	94	95	97	286	577	
23	Stefanie Thurmann	Germany	95	97	99	291	94	93	98	285	576	
24	Maura Genovesi	Italy	97	96	93	286	96	97	97	290	576	
25	Elizabeth Callahan	United States	97	97	93	287	94	96	98	288	575	
26	Olena Kostevych	Ukraine	95	100	93	288	94	95	98	287	575	
27	Sławomira Szpek	Poland	96	93	94	283	98	98	96	292	575	
28	Rebecca Snyder	United States	96	96	95	287	98	94	96	288	575	
29	Sandra Kolly	Switzerland	98	94	97	289	94	96	95	285	574	
30	Mirosława Sagun Lewandowska	Poland	96	95	97	288	95	99	92	286	574	
31	Zauresh Baibussinova	Kazakhstan	92	95	94	281	97	97	96	290	571	
32	Zsófia Csonka	Hungary	95	95	97	287	95	93	96	284	571	
33	Dina Aspandiyarova	Australia	95	99	96	290	93	94	94	281	571	
34	Michaela Musilová	Czech Republic	96	97	95	288	97	94	92	283	571	
35	Lindita Kodra	Albania	92	94	97	283	98	97	92	287	570	
36	Maria Pilar Fernandez	Spain	97	96	98	291	83	95	100	278	569	
37	Irena Tanova	Bulgaria	97	93	90	280	94	97	98	289	569	
38	Zhanna Shapialevich	Belarus	94	96	97	287	92	95	95	282	569	
39	Huang Yi-ling	Chinese Taipei	91	95	95	281	94	97	91	282	563	
40	Carmen Malo	Ecuador	94	93	94	281	90	92	96	278	559	
41	Avianna Chao	Canada	94	95	88	277	96	92	83	281	558	

EOR Equalled Olympic record – PR Precision stage – Q Qualified for final – RF Rapid fire stage

== Final ==
The final round consisted of four additional five-shot rapid fire strings. As the final rules had changed since 2004, the winner was guaranteed to establish a new Olympic record.

Rank	Athlete	Qual	1	2	3	4	Final	Total	Notes
1st place, gold medalist(s)	Chen Ying (CHN)	585	52.5	53.1	52.5	50.3	208.4	793.4	OR
2nd place, silver medalist(s)	Otryadyn Gündegmaa (MGL)	590	51.1	51.1	49.0	51.0	202.2	792.2	
3rd place, bronze medalist(s)	Munkhbayar Dorjsuren (GER)	587	48.7	50.0	52.6	50.9	202.2	789.2	
4	Fei Fengji (CHN)	582	52.4	51.3	50.8	51.4	205.9	787.9	
5	Mariya Grozdeva (BUL)	583	49.2	49.9	52.5	52.0	203.6	786.6	
6	Jo Yong-suk (PRK)	584	49.9	50.3	49.5	49.7	199.4	783.4	
7	Tanyaporn Prucksakorn (THA)	582	49.5	47.6	49.6	49.0	195.7	777.7	
8	Luisa Maida (ESA)	582	47.8	46.0	51.7	46.5	192.0	774.0	

OR Olympic record
