= Hans-Jörg Meyer =

German sport shooter (born 1964)

Personal information
- Nationality: Germany
- Born: 10 April 1964 (age 62) Wolfenbüttel, Lower Saxony, West Germany
- Height: 1.80 m (5 ft 11 in)
- Weight: 76 kg (168 lb)

Sport
- Sport: Shooting
- Event(s): 10 m air pistol (AP60); 50 m pistol (FP)
- Club: Schützenbund Broistedt
- Coached by: Philip Bernhard

Hans-Jörg Meyer (born April 10, 1964 in Wolfenbüttel, Lower Saxony) is a German sport shooter. He won a silver medal in the men's 50 m free pistol at the 2009 European Shooting Championships in Osijek, Croatia, accumulating a score of 653.8 targets.

At age forty-four, Meyer made his official debut for the 2008 Summer Olympics in Beijing, where he competed in two pistol shooting events, along with his teammate Florian Schmidt. He scored a total of 577 targets in the preliminary rounds of the men's 10 m air pistol, by one point ahead of Belarus' Yury Dauhapolau from the final attempt, finishing only in twenty-first place. Three days later, Meyer placed thirteenth in his second event, 50 m pistol, by two points ahead of U.S. shooter Daryl Szarenski, with a total score of 557 targets.
