= Shooting at the 2007 Pan American Games =

Shooting competitions at the 2007 Pan American Games in Rio de Janeiro were held in July 2007 at the Deodoro Military Club.

== Medal table ==
* Host nation (Brazil)

Rank	Nation	Gold	Silver	Bronze	Total
1	United States	10	9	3	22
2	Cuba	2	3	2	7
3	Canada	2	0	2	4
4	Argentina	1	0	2	3
5	Brazil*	0	1	1	2
5	El Salvador	0	1	1	2
5	Puerto Rico	0	1	1	2
8	Mexico	0	0	3	3
Totals (8 entries)		15	15	15	45

== Results ==
=== Men's events ===
Event	Gold	Silver	Bronze
10 metre air pistol	Jason Turner; United States	Júlio Almeida; Brazil	Thomas Rose; United States
25 metre rapid fire pistol	Leuris Pupo; Cuba	Keith Sanderson; United States	Fernando Cardoso; Brazil
50 metre pistol	Jason Turner; United States	Daryl Szarenski; United States	Yulio Zorrilla; Cuba
10 metre air rifle	Jason Parker; United States	Matthew Rawlings; United States	Roberto Elias; Mexico
50 metre rifle prone	Thomas Tamas; United States	Michael McPhail; United States	Gale Stewart; Canada
50 metre rifle three positions	Jason Parker; United States	Liecer Perez; Cuba	Juan Angeloni; Argentina
Trap	Juan Carlos Dasque; Argentina	Bret Erickson; United States	Giuseppe di Salvatore; Canada
Double trap	Joshua Richmond; United States	Jeffrey Holguin; United States	Lucas Bennazar; Puerto Rico
Skeet	Vincent Hancock; United States	James Graves; United States	Ariel Flores; Mexico

=== Women's events ===
Event	Gold	Silver	Bronze
10 metre air pistol	Avianna Chao; Canada	Luisa Maida; El Salvador	Kirenia Bello; Cuba
10 metre air rifle	Eglis Yaima Cruz; Cuba	Amy Sowash; United States	Alix Moncada; Mexico
25 metre pistol	Sandra Uptagrafft; United States	Laina Pérez; Cuba	Luisa Maida; El Salvador
50 metre rifle three positions	Jamie Beyerle; United States	Eglis Yaima Cruz; Cuba	Amanda Furrer; United States
Trap	Susan Nattrass; Canada	Deborah Feliciano; Puerto Rico	Corey Cogdell; United States
Skeet	Haley Dunn; United States	Kimberly Rhode; United States	Melisa Gil; Argentina
