= Natallia Kalnysh =

Ukrainian sport shooter (born 1974)

Personal information
- Full name: Nataliya Olehivna Kalnysh
- Nationality: Ukraine
- Born: 2 July 1974 (age 51) Kryvyi Rih, Ukrainian SSR, Soviet Union
- Height: 1.68 m (5 ft 6 in)
- Weight: 61 kg (134 lb)

Sport
- Sport: Shooting
- Event(s): 10 m air rifle (AR40); 50 m rifle 3 positions (STR3X20)
- Club: Club Krivoy-Rog Ukraina
- Coached by: Oleksandr Skuratovskii
Medal record
Women's shooting
Representing Ukraine
World Championships
Silver medal – second place	2002 Lahti	50m rifle 3 positions individual
Bronze medal – third place	2002 Lahti	50m rifle prone individual
European Championships
Gold medal – first place	1999 Bordeaux	50m rifle prone individual
Gold medal – first place	2007 Granada	50m rifle 3 positions individual
Gold medal – first place	2017 Baku	50m rifle prone team
Silver medal – second place	2005 Belgrade	50m rifle 3 positions individual
Bronze medal – third place	2001 Zagreb	50m rifle prone individual

Nataliya Olehivna Kalnysh (also Natallia Kalnysh, Ukrainian: Наталія Олегівна Кальниш; born 2 July 1974 in Kryvyi Rih) is a Ukrainian sport shooter.

== Career ==
Kalnysh made her official debut for the 2000 Summer Olympics in Sydney, where she placed twenty-eighth in the 10 m air rifle, and twenty-ninth in the 50 m rifle 3 positions, with total scores of 390 and 568 points, respectively.

She won a silver medal in the rifle three positions at the 2002 ISSF World Shooting Championships in Lahti, Finland, accumulating a score of 674.1 points.

At the 2004 Summer Olympics in Athens, Kalnysh finished fourteenth in the preliminary rounds of the women's 10 m air rifle, with a total score of 394 points, tying her position with five other shooters including United States' Hattie Johnson, and Poland's Agnieszka Staroń. She also accumulated a score of 677.2 targets (579 in the preliminary rounds and 98.2 in the final) in her second event, 50 m rifle 3 positions, by four tenths of a point (0.4) behind Germany's Barbara Lechner, finishing only in eighth place.

Eight years after competing in her first Olympics, Kalnysh qualified for her third Ukrainian team, as a 34-year-old, at the 2008 Summer Olympics in Beijing, by finishing second in the rifle three positions (STR3X20) from the 2006 ISSF World Cup series in Milan, Italy. She placed twenty-seventh in the women's 10 m air rifle by one point behind Bulgaria's Desislava Balabanova from the final attempt, with a total score of 393 points. Nearly a week later, Kalnysh competed for her second event, 50 m rifle 3 positions, where she was able to shoot 194 targets in a prone position, 185 in standing, and 192 in kneeling, for a total score of 571 points, finishing only in thirty-first place.

== Olympic results ==
Event	2000	2004	2008
50 metre rifle three positions	29th 568	8th 579+98.2	31st 571
10 metre air rifle	28th 390	14th 394	27th 393
