= Giuseppe di Salvatore =

Canadian sport shooter

Personal information
- Nationality: Canada
- Born: 19 December 1989 (age 36) Vancouver, British Columbia, Canada
- Height: 1.78 m (5 ft 10 in)
- Weight: 100 kg (220 lb)

Sport
- Sport: Shooting
- Event(s): Trap, double trap
- Club: Vancouver Gun Club
- Coached by: Josh Lakatos
Medal record
Men's shooting
Representing Canada
Pan American Games
| Bronze medal – third place | 2007 Rio de Janeiro | Trap |

Giuseppe di Salvatore (born December 19, 1989, in Vancouver, British Columbia) is a Canadian sport shooter. He is a bronze medalist in men's trap shooting at the 2007 Pan American Games in Rio de Janeiro, Brazil.

== Shooting career ==
Di Salvatore, a native of Surrey, British Columbia, started his sporting career at the age of seven, when his father Tony convinced him to shoot a gun. He later became a member of the Vancouver Guns Club, and is currently coached and trained by Josh Lakatos, silver medalist in men's trap shooting at the 1996 Summer Olympics in Atlanta, Georgia.

At the peak of his career, di Salvatore had produced numerous achievements, including his first ever title from the 2006 Canadian National Shooting Championships. In 2007, he became the youngest ever shooter to claim a bronze medal in men's trap shooting at the Pan American Games in Rio de Janeiro, Brazil, accumulating a score of 134 clay pigeons. Following his success from these games, di Salvatore earned a spot on the Canadian shooting team for the Olympics.

At the 2008 Summer Olympics in Beijing, di Salvatore became one of the youngest shooters to compete in shotgun events (both trap and double trap). He scored a total of 112 clay pigeons in the preliminary rounds of the men's trap, by one point behind France's Stéphane Clamens from the final attempt, finishing only in twenty-fifth place. Two days later, he placed nineteenth in his second event, the double trap, by four points behind New Zealand's Graeme Ede, with a total score of 109 targets.
