= Shooting at the 2008 Summer Olympics – Men's trap =

Men's trap at the Games of the XXIX Olympiad
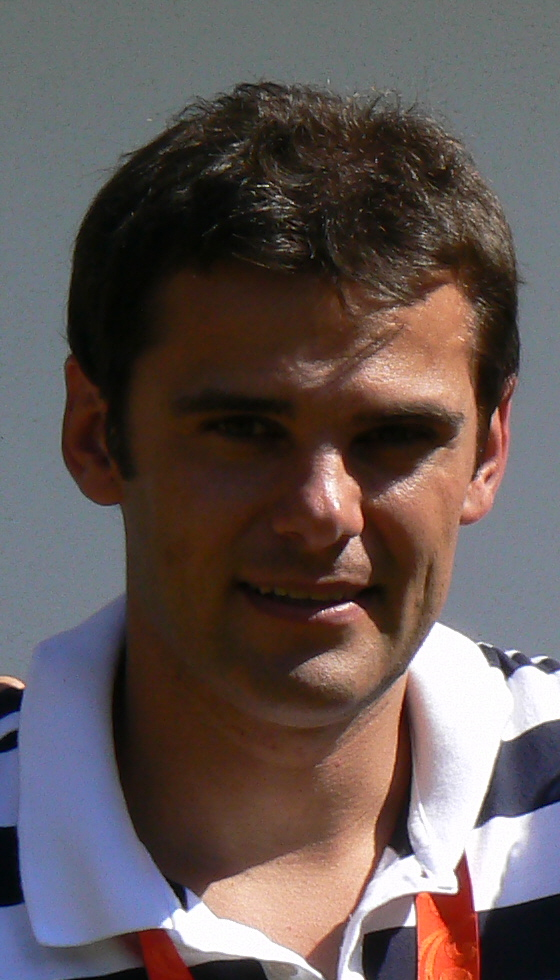
- Gold medalist David Kostelecký
- Venue: Beijing Shooting Range Clay Target Field
- Dates: August 9, 2008; August 10, 2008
- Competitors: 35 from 25 nations
- Winning score: 146 OR

Medalists
1st place, gold medalist(s)		David Kostelecký	Czech Republic
2nd place, silver medalist(s)		Giovanni Pellielo	Italy
3rd place, bronze medalist(s)		Aleksei Alipov	Russia

The men's trap event at the 2008 Summer Olympics took place on August 9 and 10 at the Beijing Shooting Range Clay Target Field. There were 35 competitors from 25 nations, with each nation having up to two shooters. The Czech Republic won its second shooting gold in two days through David Kostelecký, shooting a perfect 25 in the final round and establishing an Olympic record of 146 hits total after a 2005 rule change. It was the Czech Republic's first medal in the men's trap (though two men from what is now the Czech Republic won medals competing for Czechoslovakia). Giovanni Pellielo of Italy repeated as the silver medalist; in addition to his 2000 bronze, this made Pellielo the first (and, as of the 2016 Games, still the only) man to earn at least three medals in the event; he would go on to win a fourth (another silver) in 2016. Defending Olympic champion Aleksei Alipov of Russia took bronze this year, making him the fifth man to earn two medals in the trap.

== Background ==
This was the 20th appearance of the men's ISSF Olympic trap event. The event was held at every Summer Olympics from 1896 to 1924 (except 1904, when no shooting events were held) and from 1952 to 2016; it was open to women from 1968 to 1992.

Four of the 6 finalists from the 2004 Games returned: gold medalist Alexey Alipov of Russia, silver medalist (and 2000 bronze medalist) Giovanni Pellielo of Italy, fourth-place finisher Ahmed Al-Maktoum of the United Arab Emirates, and fifth-place finisher (and 1996 bronze medalist) Lance Bade of the United States. Two-time (1996 and 2000) gold medalist Michael Diamond of Australia, who had finished 8th in 2004 and missed the cut for the finals, also returned; so did 2000 finalist David Kostelecký, who had not competed in 2004. Diamond was the reigning World Champion again, having won in 2007 (as well as 1999 and 2001). He was favoured once again. Another World Champion (Manavjit Singh Sandhu of India, 2006) was competing in 2008.

For the first time since 1920, no nations made their debut in the event. France made its 18th appearance, matching the absent Great Britain for most among nations.

== Qualification ==
Each National Olympic Committee (NOC) could enter up to two shooters if the NOC earned enough quota sports or had enough crossover-qualified shooters. To compete, a shooter needed a quota spot and to achieve a Minimum Qualification Score (MQS). Once a shooter was using a quota spot in any shooting event, they could enter any other shooting event for which they had achieved the MQS as well (a crossover qualification). There were 32 quota spots available for the trap event: 1 for the host nation, 1 at the 2005 World Championship, 5 at the 2002 World Cup events, 3 at the 2006 World Championship, 4 at the 2007 World Cup events, 1 at the 2007 African Championships, 4 at the 2007 European Championships, 2 at the 2007 Pan American Games, 1 at the 2007 World Championship, 3 at the 2007 Asian Championships, 1 at the 2007 Oceania Championships, and 2 invitational places. There were three places used in exchanges, reallocation, and crossover.

== Competition format ==
The competition used the two-round 125+25 format introduced in 1996. A small but significant change had been introduced by a 2005 rules change, however; only one shot per target was allowed in the final round (rather than the two still used in qualifying and previously used in the final).

The event consisted of two rounds: a qualifier and a final. In the qualifier, each shooter fired 5 sets of 25 targets in trap shooting, with 10 targets being thrown to the left, 10 to the right, and 5 straight-away in each set. The shooters could take two shots at each target.

The top 6 shooters in the qualifying round moved on to the final round. There, they fired one additional round of 25 targets, where only one shot could be taken at each target. The total score from all 150 targets was used to determine final ranking. Ties were broken using a shoot-off; additional shots are fired one at a time until there is no longer a tie.

== Records ==
Prior to this competition, the existing world and Olympic records were as follows. There was no final-round Olympic record due to the rule change limiting competitors to one shot per target in the final round.

Qualification records
World record	Giovanni Pellielo (ITA); Ray Ycong (USA); Marcello Tittarelli (ITA); Lance Bade (USA); Pavel Gurkin (RUS); David Kostelecký (CZE)	125	Nicosia, Cyprus; Lahti, Finland; Suhl, Germany; Barcelona, Spain; Americana, Brazil; Granada, Spain	1 April 1994; 9 June 1995; 11 June 1996; 23 July 1998; 10 August 2005; 5 October 2006
Olympic record	Michael Diamond (AUS); Aleksei Alipov (RUS)	124	Atlanta, United States; Athens, Greece	21 July 1996; 15 August 2004

Final records
World record	Karsten Bindrich (GER)	149	Nicosia, Cyprus	10 July 2008
Olympic record	ISSF Rule changed on 01.01.2005	–	–	–

David Kostelecký set the initial Olympic record for the new final total, hitting 146 targets.

== Schedule ==
All times are China Standard Time (UTC+8)

Date	Time	Round
Saturday, 9 August 2008	9:00	Qualifying: Course 1
Sunday, 10 August 2008	9:00; 15:00	Qualifying: Course 2 Final

== Results ==
=== Qualifying round ===
The qualifying round was held between 09:00 and 13:30 China Standard Time (UTC+8) on Saturday (first three rounds) and between 09:00 and 12:00 on Sunday (last two rounds).

Rank	Shooter	Nation	1	2	3	Day 1	4	5	Total	Shoot-off	Notes
1	Aleksei Alipov	Russia	23	24	25	72	25	24	121	—N/a	Q
2	David Kostelecký	Czech Republic	24	24	25	73	24	24	121	—N/a	Q
3	Erminio Frasca	Italy	23	24	25	72	24	24	120	—N/a	Q
4	Giovanni Pellielo	Italy	25	25	23	73	24	23	120	—N/a	Q
5	Michael Diamond	Australia	25	23	24	72	24	23	119	3	Q
6	Josip Glasnović	Croatia	25	23	24	72	25	22	119	3	Q
7	Karsten Bindrich	Germany	24	23	24	71	25	23	119	2	
8	Mansher Singh	India	25	24	20	69	24	24	117	—N/a	
9	Erik Varga	Slovakia	23	25	24	72	23	22	117	—N/a	
10	Jesús Serrano	Spain	24	21	23	68	24	24	116	—N/a	
11	Pavel Gurkin	Russia	24	24	21	69	23	24	116	—N/a	
12	Manavjit Singh Sandhu	India	23	23	24	70	22	24	116	—N/a	
13	Glenn Kable	Fiji	24	21	22	67	23	25	115	—N/a	
14	Mário Filipovič	Slovakia	22	24	24	70	22	23	115	—N/a	
15	Lee Young-sik	South Korea	23	24	23	70	22	23	115	—N/a	
16	Li Yang	China	24	21	24	69	24	22	115	—N/a	
17	Yves Tronc	France	24	23	22	69	24	22	115	—N/a	
18	Naser Meqlad	Kuwait	23	24	24	71	22	22	115	—N/a	
19	Juan Carlos Dasque	Argentina	21	24	25	70	24	21	115	—N/a	
20	Graeme Ede	New Zealand	21	24	20	65	25	24	114	—N/a	
21	Li Yajun	China	18	23	24	65	24	24	113	—N/a	
22	Bret Erickson	United States	20	23	22	65	24	24	113	—N/a	
23	Dominic Grazioli	United States	23	24	22	69	20	24	113	—N/a	
24	Stefan Rüttgeroth	Germany	24	21	21	66	24	23	113	—N/a	
25	Stéphane Clamens	France	25	20	20	65	23	24	112	—N/a	
26	Giuseppe Di Salvatore	Canada	24	23	19	66	23	23	112	—N/a	
27	Manuel Silva	Portugal	22	23	23	68	22	21	111	—N/a	
28	Lee Wung Yew	Singapore	23	24	22	69	19	22	110	—N/a	
29	Derek Burnett	Ireland	24	22	23	69	22	19	110	—N/a	
30	Ahmed Al-Maktoum	United Arab Emirates	24	23	22	69	22	19	110	—N/a	
31	Craig Henwood	Australia	22	21	23	66	23	20	109	—N/a	
32	Adham Medhat	Egypt	20	22	22	64	23	21	108	—N/a	
33	Alberto Fernández	Spain	24	23	16	63	22	21	106	—N/a	
34	Cesar David Menacho Flores	Bolivia	24	22	21	67	18	21	106	—N/a	
35	Eric Ang	Philippines	19	24	22	65	21	20	106	—N/a	

=== Final ===
The final was held at 15:00 China Standard Time (UTC+8) on Sunday.

Rank	Shooter	Nation	Qual	Final	Total	5th place shoot-off	Bronze shoot-off	Notes
1st place, gold medalist(s)	David Kostelecký	Czech Republic	121	25	146	—N/a		OR
2nd place, silver medalist(s)	Giovanni Pellielo	Italy	120	23	143	—N/a		
3rd place, bronze medalist(s)	Aleksei Alipov	Russia	121	21	142	—N/a	3	
4	Michael Diamond	Australia	119	23	142	—N/a	2	
5	Josip Glasnović	Croatia	119	21	140	2	—N/a	
6	Erminio Frasca	Italy	120	20	140	1	—N/a	
