= Kim Jang-mi =

South Korean sport shooter (born 1992)

Personal information
- Nationality: South Korean
- Born: September 25, 1992 (age 33) Incheon, South Korea
- Height: 1.60 m (5 ft 3 in)
- Weight: 53 kg (117 lb)

Sport
- Country: South Korea
- Sport: Shooting
Medal record
Women's shooting
Representing South Korea
Olympic Games
Gold medal – first place	2012 London	25m pistol
World Championships
Gold medal – first place	2022 Cairo	25m pistol
Silver medal – second place	2022 Cairo	25 m standard pistol mixed team
Bronze medal – third place	2022 Cairo	25 m rapid fire pistol mixed team
Asian Championships
Gold medal – first place	2012 Doha	10 m air pistol
Gold medal – first place	2015 Kuwait City	10 m air pistol team
Gold medal – first place	2015 Kuwait City	25 m pistol team
Gold medal – first place	2019 Doha	25 m pistol team
Silver medal – second place	2012 Doha	25 m pistol team
Bronze medal – third place	2012 Doha	10 m air pistol team
Bronze medal – third place	2015 Kuwait City	10 m air pistol
Asian Airgun Championships
Gold medal – first place	2022 Daegu	10 m air pistol team
Bronze medal – third place	2022 Daegu	10 m air pistol
Youth Olympic Games
Gold medal – first place	2010 Singapore	10m air pistol

Kim Jang-mi (Korean: 김장미; Korean pronunciation: [kim.dʑaŋ.mi]; born September 25, 1992, in Incheon, South Korea) is a South Korean female sport shooter. At the 2012 Summer Olympics, she competed in the Women's 10 metre air pistol and the Women's 25 metre pistol. On August 1, 2012, Kim Jang-mi won the women's 25 metre pistol gold medal after defeating China's defending champion Chen Ying.

== See also ==
- List of Olympic medalists in shooting
- List of Youth Olympic Games gold medalists who won Olympic gold medals
