= Shooting at the 2012 Summer Olympics – Women's 25 metre pistol =

Women's 25 metre pistol at the Games of the XXX Olympiad
- Venue: Royal Artillery Barracks
- Date: 29 July 2012
- Competitors: 39 from 29 nations
- Winning score: 792.4

Medalists
1st place, gold medalist(s)		Kim Jang-Mi	South Korea
2nd place, silver medalist(s)		Chen Ying	China
3rd place, bronze medalist(s)		Olena Kostevych	Ukraine

The Women's 25 metre pistol event at the 2012 Olympic Games took place on 1 August 2012 at the Royal Artillery Barracks.

The event consisted of two rounds: a qualifier and a final. In the qualifier, each shooter fired 60 shots with a pistol at 25 metres distance. Scores for each shot were in increments of 1, with a maximum score of 10. The first 30 shots were in the precision stage, with series of 5 shots being shot within 5 minutes. The second set of 30 shots gave shooters 3 seconds to take each shot.

The top 8 shooters in the qualifying round moved on to the final round. There, they fired an additional 20 shots. These shots scored in increments of .1, with a maximum score of 10.9. They were fired in four sets of 5 rapid fire shots. The total score from all 80 shots was used to determine final ranking. The event was won by Kim Jang-Mi.

== Records ==
Prior to this competition, the existing world and Olympic records were as follows.

Qualification records
World record	Diana Iorgova (BUL)	594	Milan, Italy	31 May 1994
Olympic record	Tao Luna (CHN)	590	Sydney, Australia	22 September 2000

Final records
World record	Kim Jang-Mi (KOR)	796.9 (592+204.9)	London, Great Britain	22 April 2012
Olympic record	Chen Ying (CHN)	793.4 (585+208.4)	Beijing, China	13 August 2008

== Qualification round ==
Rank	Athlete	Country	1	2	3	PR	4	5	6	RF	Total	Notes
1	Kim Jang-Mi	South Korea	98	100	100	298	98	97	98	293	591	Q, OR
2	Tanyaporn Prucksakorn	Thailand	100	97	98	295	98	97	96	291	586	Q
3	Chen Ying	China	97	95	96	288	98	99	100	297	585	Q
4	Kira Mozgalova	Russia	93	99	97	289	99	99	98	296	585	Q
5	Olena Kostevych	Ukraine	98	96	99	293	100	95	97	292	585	Q
6	Zsófia Csonka	Hungary	98	96	97	291	99	98	96	293	584	Q
7	Jo Yong-Suk	North Korea	94	97	97	288	98	98	99	295	583 (50)	Q
8	Zorana Arunović	Serbia	97	99	97	293	96	95	99	290	583 (49)	Q
9	Maria Grozdeva	Bulgaria	100	94	90	284	100	100	99	299	583 (48)	
10	Antoaneta Boneva	Bulgaria	97	96	96	289	97	99	99	293	582	
11	Kim Kyeong-Ae	South Korea	95	95	96	286	99	100	97	296	582	
12	Munkhbayar Dorjsuren	Germany	97	99	98	294	96	98	94	288	582	
13	Lenka Marušková	Czech Republic	97	98	97	292	97	96	97	290	582	
14	Stéphanie Tirode	France	99	97	96	292	96	97	97	290	582	
15	Nino Salukvadze	Georgia	97	98	94	289	96	96	100	289	581	
16	Tien Chia-chen	Chinese Taipei	95	96	98	289	98	97	96	291	580	
17	Lalita Yauhleuskaya	Australia	96	95	97	288	98	99	95	292	580	
18	Jasna Šekarić	Serbia	95	93	96	284	99	99	97	295	579	
19	Rahi Sarnobot	India	97	98	96	291	96	96	96	288	579	
20	Yuan Jing	China	95	96	97	288	96	99	96	291	579	
21	Celine Goberville	France	97	98	98	293	98	93	95	286	579	
22	Sonia Franquet	Spain	97	98	98	293	92	98	96	286	579	
23	Irada Ashumova	Azerbaijan	97	96	94	287	100	95	96	291	578	
24	Anna Mastyanina	Russia	92	98	96	286	96	98	98	292	578	
25	Viktoria Chaika	Belarus	97	96	96	289	98	94	97	289	578	
26	Claudia Verdicchio-Krause	Germany	96	96	97	289	97	97	95	289	578	
27	Gundegmaa Otryad	Mongolia	93	95	96	284	99	99	95	293	577	
28	Sandra Uptagrafft	United States	95	94	97	286	98	98	94	290	576	
29	Heidi Diethelm Gerber	Switzerland	95	98	96	289	97	97	95	286	575	
30	Annu Raj Singh	India	96	94	96	286	96	96	97	289	575	
31	Yukari Konishi	Japan	95	96	91	282	100	96	96	292	574	
32	Le Thi Hoang Ngoc	Vietnam	95	96	98	289	92	93	100	285	574	
33	Joana Castelão	Portugal	97	92	94	283	93	97	98	288	571	
34	Hayley Chapman	Australia	93	92	93	278	97	96	97	290	568	
35	Beata Bartków-Kwiatkowska	Poland	95	96	96	287	91	95	94	280	567	
36	Naphaswan Yangpaiboon	Thailand	93	95	95	283	97	93	93	283	566	
37	Georgina Geikie	Great Britain	94	95	95	284	94	94	90	278	562	
38	Maribel Pineda	Venezuela	96	99	93	288	90	90	92	272	560	
39	Ana Luiza Souza Lima	Brazil	94	92	94	280	94	89	97	280	560	

== Final ==
Rank	Athlete	Qual	1	2	3	4	Final	Total	Notes
1st place, gold medalist(s)	Kim Jang-Mi (KOR)	591	51.2	49.1	49.3	51.8	201.4	792.4	
2nd place, silver medalist(s)	Chen Ying (CHN)	585	52.0	51.6	52.8	50.0	206.4	791.4	
3rd place, bronze medalist(s)	Olena Kostevych (UKR)	585	51.2	51.3	48.9	52.2	203.6	788.6	
4	Zorana Arunović (SRB)	583	50.9	51.8	51.6	50.0	204.3	787.3	
5	Kira Mozgalova (RUS)	585	49.2	49.7	51.7	51.3	201.9	786.9	
6	Zsófia Csonka (HUN)	584	51.3	50.6	48.4	49.7	200.0	784.0	
7	Jo Yong-Suk (PRK)	583	48.1	50.3	50.0	50.9	199.3	782.3	
8	Tanyaporn Prucksakorn (THA)	586	50.1	46.8	49.2	46.3	192.4	778.4	
