= Yang Wang (sport shooter) =

New Zealand sport shooter

Personal information
- Nationality: New Zealand
- Born: 25 March 1976 (age 50) Hebei, China
- Height: 1.78 m (5 ft 10 in)
- Weight: 80 kg (176 lb)

Sport
- Sport: Shooting
- Event: 10 m air pistol (AP60)

Yang Wang (born 25 March 1976 in Hebei, China) is a New Zealand sport shooter of Chinese origin. Yang represented his adopted nation New Zealand at the 2008 Summer Olympics in Beijing, where he competed in the men's 10 m air pistol. He finished only in thirty-ninth place by two points behind Germany's Florian Schmidt from the final attempt, for a total score of 571 targets.
