= Yuliya Alipova =

Belarusian-born Russian sport shooter

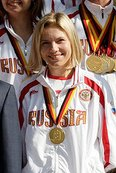

Personal information
- Full name: Yuliya Nikolayevna Alipova
- Nationality: Belarus; Russia
- Born: 23 September 1977 (age 48) Barysaw, Byelorussian SSR, Soviet Union
- Height: 1.67 m (5 ft 5 1/2 in)
- Weight: 54 kg (119 lb)

Sport
- Sport: Shooting
- Event(s): 10 m air pistol (AP40); 25 m pistol (SP)
- Club: SK VS Brest (BLR); CSKA (RUS)
- Coached by: Valery Kukartsau

Yuliya Nikolayevna Alipova (née Siniak) (Russian: Юлия Николаевна Алипова; Belarusian: Юлія Мікалаеўна Алипава / Yuliya Mikalayeuna Alipava; born September 23, 1977, in Barysaw, Belarusian SSR) is a Belarusian-born Russian sport shooter. She is a four-time Olympian and a two-time medalist for the 10 and 25 m pistol events at the 1995 ISSF World Cup in Seoul, South Korea. Alipava is also the wife of Alexey Alipov, who won the gold medal in men's trap shooting at the 2004 Summer Olympics in Athens, Greece.

At age nineteen, Alipava made her official debut for the 1996 Summer Olympics in Atlanta, where she placed ninth in the women's 25 m pistol, and tenth in the women's 10 m air pistol. At the 2000 Summer Olympics in Sydney, Alipava reached the final of the 25 m pistol; however, she narrowly lost the medal by one tenth of a point (0.3) behind her teammate Lalita Yauhleuskaya (now playing for Australia), with a total score of 685.9 points (584 in the preliminary rounds and 101.9 in the final).

At the 2004 Summer Olympics in Athens, Alipava competed in two pistol shooting events. She placed tenth out of forty-one shooters in the women's 10 m air pistol, with a score of 382 points. Three days later, Alipava competed for her second event, 25 m pistol, where she was able to shoot 286 targets in the precision stage, and 285 in the rapid fire, for a total score of 581 points, finishing only in twenty-fifth place.

Twelve years after competing in her first Olympics, Alipava qualified for the women's 25 m pistol, as a member of the Russian team, at the 2008 Summer Olympics in Beijing. She finished only in eighteenth place by three points ahead of her teammate Natalia Paderina from the final attempt, for a total score of 579 points (287 in the precision stage and 292 in the rapid fire).

== Olympic results ==
Event	1996	2000	2004	2008
25 metre pistol	9th 578	4th 584+101.9	25th 571	18th 579
10 metre air pistol	10th 381	—	10th 382	—
