= Rebecca Snyder (sport shooter) =

American sports shooter

Personal information
- Full name: Rebecca Nicole Snyder
- Nickname: Beki
- Nationality: United States
- Born: July 15, 1976 (age 49) Didsbury, Alberta, Canada
- Height: 1.57 m (5 ft 2 in)
- Weight: 77 kg (170 lb)

Sport
- Sport: Shooting
- Event(s): 10 m air pistol (AP40); 25 m pistol (SP)
- Coached by: Sergey Luzov
Medal record
Women's shooting
Representing the United States
Pan American Games
Silver medal – second place	1999 Winnipeg	AP40

Rebecca Nicole "Beki" Snyder (born July 15, 1976) is a Canadian-born American sport shooter. She is a four-time Olympian, and won a silver medal for pistol shooting at the 1999 Pan American Games in Winnipeg, Manitoba. She was also a resident athlete at the U.S. Olympic Training Center in Colorado Springs, Colorado.

== Shooting career ==
Snyder—a native of Grand Junction, Colorado—began rifle shooting with her brother and father as a family sport, until she began using a more compact pistol when she was 14 years old. She later became a resident athlete at the U.S. Olympic Training Center (USOC) in Colorado Springs, and eventually attended the University of Colorado, where she pursued her business degree.

Since moving to Colorado as a member of USOC, Snyder had competed in numerous shooting tournaments, and achieved five gold medals in both air and sport pistol at the USA Shooting National Championships. Between 1999 and 2000, Snyder reached her breakthrough in shooting, when she captured two gold medals for the 10 m air pistol, and bronze for the 25 m sport pistol at the ISSF World Cup series in Atlanta, Georgia, and in Sydney, Australia, respectively. She also competed for all pistol shooting events at the 1996 Summer Olympics in Atlanta, 2000 Summer Olympics in Sydney, and 2004 Summer Olympics in Athens, but she neither reached the final round, nor claimed an Olympic medal.

Twelve years after competing in her first Olympics, Snyder qualified for her fourth U.S. shooting team as a 32-year-old, at the 2008 Summer Olympics in Beijing. She achieved this by placing second in the air and sport pistol from the U.S. Olympic Team Trials in Fort Benning, Georgia. She placed forty-first out of forty-four shooters in the women's 10 m air pistol by one point behind Albania's Lindita Kodra, with a total score of 370 targets. Three days later, she competed for her second event, 25 m pistol, where she was able to shoot 287 targets in the precision stage, and 288 in the rapid fire, for a total score of 575 points, finishing only in twenty-eighth place.

== Olympic results ==
Event	1996	2000	2004	2008
25 metre pistol	—	10th 580	21st 574	28th 575
10 metre air pistol	30th 372	25th 376	16th 380	41st 370
