= Stefanie Thurmann =

German sport shooter (born 1982)

Personal information
- Nationality: Germany
- Born: 25 March 1982 (age 44) Perleberg, Brandenburg, East Germany
- Height: 1.69 m (5 ft 7 in)
- Weight: 80 kg (176 lb)

Sport
- Sport: Shooting
- Event(s): 10 m air pistol (AP40); 25 m pistol (SP)
- Club: SG Frankfurt Oder 1406
- Coached by: Karl-Heinz Urban

Stefanie Thurmann (born 25 March 1982 in Perleberg, Brandenburg) is a German sport shooter. She won a bronze medal in the women's sport pistol at the 2009 ISSF World Cup series in Changwon, South Korea, accumulating a score of 787.2 points.

Thurmann represented Germany at the 2008 Summer Olympics in Beijing, where she competed in the women's 25 m pistol, along with her teammate Munkhbayar Dorjsuren, who eventually won the bronze medal in the final. She finished only in twenty-third place by one point ahead of Italy's Maura Genovesi from the final attempt, for a total score of 576 points (291 in the precision stage and 285 in the rapid fire).
