= Brigitte Roy =

French sport shooter (born 1959)

Personal information
- Nationality: France
- Born: 25 February 1959 (age 67) Sainte-Foy-la-Grande, Gironde, France
- Height: 1.55 m (5 ft 1 in)
- Weight: 67 kg (148 lb)

Sport
- Sport: Shooting
- Event(s): 10 m air pistol (AP40); 25 m pistol (SP)
- Club: Association Sportive Libourne
- Coached by: Zeljko Todorovic

Brigitte Roy (born February 25, 1959, in Sainte-Foy-la-Grande, Gironde) is a French sport shooter. She is also a member of Association Sportive Libourne for the shooting class, and is coached and trained by Zeljko Todorovic.

At age forty-five, Roy became the oldest French shooter to compete for the 2004 Summer Olympics in Athens. She placed thirtieth in the 10 metre air pistol, with a score of 374 points. She also finished tenth in the qualifying rounds of women's 25 metre pistol, with an impressive score of 578 points, tying her position with China's Cao Ying and Australia's Lalita Yauhleuskaya.

At the 2008 Summer Olympics in Beijing, Roy competed for the second time in two pistol shooting events. She placed twenty-third out of forty-four shooters in the women's 10 metre air pistol, with a total score of 379 points. Three days later, Roy competed for her second event, 25 metre pistol, where she was able to shoot 289 targets in the precision stage, and 291 in rapid-fire, for an overall total score of 580 points, finishing only in fifteenth place.
