= Luisa Maida =

Salvadoran sports shooter (born 1979)

Personal information
- Full name: Luisa Cristina del Rosario Maida; Leiva
- Nationality: El Salvador
- Born: 7 October 1979 (age 46) San Salvador, El Salvador
- Height: 1.65 m (5 ft 5 in)
- Weight: 52 kg (115 lb)

Sport
- Sport: Shooting
- Events: 10 m air pistol (AP40); 25 m pistol (SP)
- Coached by: Stan Martin
Medal record
Women's shooting
Representing El Salvador
Pan American Games
Silver medal – second place	2007 Rio de Janeiro	AP40
Bronze medal – third place	2007 Rio de Janeiro	SP

Luisa Cristina del Rosario Maida Leiva (born October 7, 1979 in San Salvador) is a Salvadoran sport shooter. She won two medals, silver and bronze, for the 10 and 25 m pistol events at the 2007 Pan American Games in Rio de Janeiro, Brazil.

Maida made her official debut for the 2000 Summer Olympics in Sydney, where she placed thirty-sixth in the 10 m air pistol, and forty-first in the 25 m pistol, with total scores of 368 and 557 points, respectively.

Eight years later, Maida qualified for her second Olympic team as a 29-year-old. At the 2008 Summer Olympics in Beijing she competed in two pistol shooting events, placing thirty-fourth out of forty-four shooters in the women's 10 m air pistol by two points ahead of Czech Republic's Michaela Musilová, with a total score of 375 targets. Three days later, Maida reached the final of the women's 25 m pistol, as the first female Latin American sport shooter, after scoring a total of 582 targets (292 in the precision stage and 290 in the rapid fire) from the qualifying rounds. However, she only finished in the eighth place by 3.7 points behind Thailand's Tanyaporn Prucksakorn, with a total score of 774 targets (192 in the final).

== Olympic results ==
Event	2000	2008
25 metre pistol	41st 557	8th 582+192.0
10 metre air pistol	36th 368	34th 557
