= Maura Genovesi =

Italian sport shooter (born 1973)

Personal information
- Nationality: Italy
- Born: 25 May 1973 (age 53) Lucca, Italy
- Height: 1.63 m (5 ft 4 in)
- Weight: 54 kg (119 lb)

Sport
- Sport: Shooting
- Event(s): 10 m air pistol (AP40); 25 m pistol (SP)
- Club: Gruppo Sportivo Forestale
- Coached by: Aldo Andreotti

Maura Genovesi (born 25 May 1973 in Lucca) is an Italian sport shooter. She won a silver medal in women's sport pistol at the 2008 ISSF World Cup series in Rio de Janeiro, Brazil, accumulating a score of 784.9 points. Genovesi is a member of the shooting team for Gruppo Sportivo Forestale, and is coached and trained by Aldo Andreotti.

Genovesi represented Italy at the 2008 Summer Olympics in Beijing, where she competed in two pistol shooting events. She placed twenty-eighth out of forty-four shooters in the women's 10 m air pistol, by one point ahead of Hungary's Zsófia Csonka from the final attempt, with a total score of 378 targets. Three days later, Genovesi competed for her second event, 25 m pistol, where she was able to shoot 291 targets in the precision stage, and 285 in the rapid fire, for a total score of 576 points, finishing only in twenty-fourth place.
