= Marie Laure Gigon =

French sport shooter

Personal information
- Nationality: France
- Born: 15 June 1984 (age 42) Besançon, Doubs, France
- Height: 1.65 m (5 ft 5 in)
- Weight: 57 kg (126 lb)

Sport
- Sport: Shooting
- Event(s): 10 m air rifle (AR40); 50 m rifle 3 positions (STR3X20)
- Club: ATP de Maiche
- Coached by: Maxime Lasalle

Marie Laure Gigon (born 15 June 1984) is a French sport shooter. She is also a member of ATP de Maiche for the shooting class, and is coached and trained by Maxime Lasalle.

== Biography ==
Gigon represented France at the 2008 Summer Olympics in Beijing, where she competed for two rifle shooting events. She placed seventh out of forty-seven shooters in the women's 10 m air rifle, with a total score of 497.3 points (396 in the preliminary and 101.3 in the final). Nearly a week later, Gigon competed for her second event, 50 m rifle 3 positions, where she was able to shoot 184 targets in a standing position, and 192 each in prone and in kneeling, for a total score of 568 points, finishing only in thirty-eighth place.
