= Stênio Yamamoto =

Brazilian sport shooter

Personal information
- Full name: Stênio Akira Yamamoto
- Nationality: Brazil
- Born: 24 June 1961 (age 65) São Paulo, Brazil
- Height: 1.73 m (5 ft 8 in)
- Weight: 90 kg (198 lb)

Sport
- Sport: Shooting
- Events: 10 m air pistol (AP60); 50 m pistol (FP)

Stênio Akira Yamamoto (born June 24, 1961) is a Brazilian sport shooter of Japanese descent. He won a silver medal in the free pistol at the 2007 ISSF World Cup series in Munich, Germany, with a score of 660.8 points.

At age forty-seven, Yamamoto made his official debut for the 2008 Summer Olympics in Beijing, where he competed in two pistol shooting events. He scored a total of 568 targets in the preliminary rounds of the men's 10 m air pistol, by one point ahead of Romania's Iulian Raicea, finishing only in forty-third place. Three days later, Yamamoto placed forty-fourth in his second event, 50 m pistol, by two points behind Tajikistan's Sergey Babikov, with a total score of 538 targets.
