= Avneet Sidhu =

Indian sport shooter

Avneet Kaur Sidhu
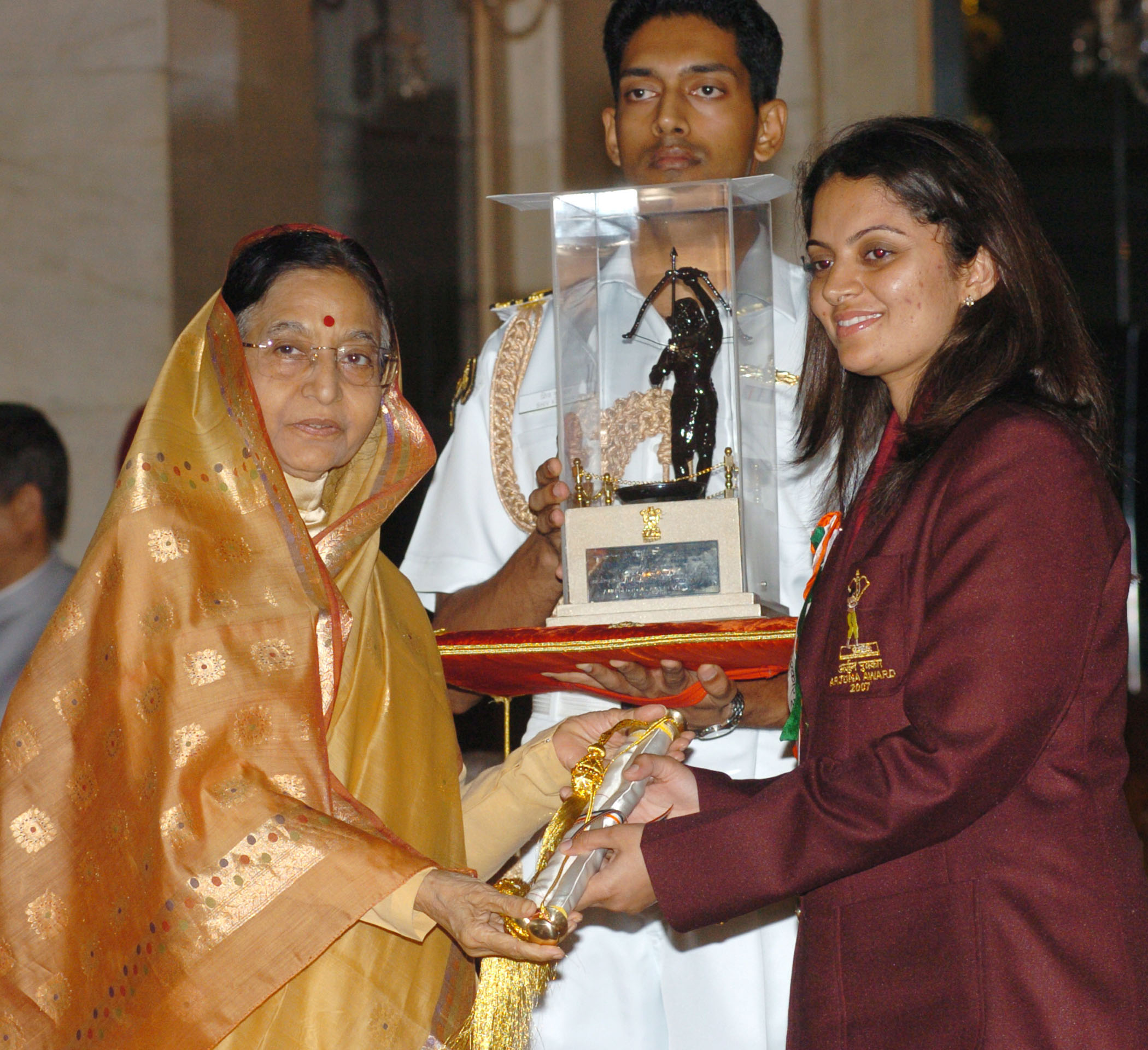
- The President, Smt. Pratibha Devisingh Patil presenting the “Arjuna” Award – 2007, to Ms. Avneet Kaur Sidhu (Shooting), in New Delhi on August 29, 2008

Personal information
- Nationality: Indian
- Citizenship: Indian
- Born: 30 October 1981 (age 44) Punjab, India
- Occupation: Sport shooter
Medal record
Women's shooting
Representing India
Asian Championships
Bronze medal – third place	2007 Kuwait City	10 m air rifle team

Avneet Kaur Sidhu (Bathinda, 30 October 1981) is an Indian sport shooter. She won the gold medal in the Women's 10m Air Rifle (Pairs) with Tejaswini Sawant at the 2006 Commonwealth Games. She contested in the 10 m air rifle and 50 m rifle three positions at the 2008 Summer Olympics in Beijing. Her various achievements in national and international events are:

== Awards and achievements ==
- Commonwealth Games 2006, Melbourne - Gold medal Team
- Commonwealth Games 2006, Melbourne - Silver Medal Individual*
- Asian Games, Doha 2006 - Bronze medal
- 11th Asian Shooting Championship, Kuwait, 2007 - Bronze medal
- 33rd National Games, Guwahati, 2007 - two silver medals
- 51st National Shooting Championship, Ahmedabad - Gold medal
- 2008: Received the Arjuna Award
- 2013- Received the Maharaja Ranjit Singh Award
- 2008: Australia Cup, Sydney - Gold medal
- 2010 - InterShoot, Netherlands - Individual Silver and Team Gold medal
- 2011- Team Gold medal- National Championship
- 2012, 2013, 2015, 2016 - Gold medals in all four All India Police Shooting Championships
- 2017 - World Police Games, Los Angeles, USA - one Gold, one Silver and two Bronze medals

Has won more than 100 medals in different national and international competitions

In August 2006, winning an Olympic quota for India in the 49th World Shooting Championship held at Zagreb (Croatia), she became the sixth sportsperson (shooting) of the country to book a quota place in the Olympic Games 2008 Beijing, China. Among the long tally of her achievements, a bronze medal that she won in the 15th Asian Games held at Doha (Qatar) in 2006, a bronze in the 11th Asian Shooting Championship held in Kuwait and a gold medal in AISL Australia Cup II held at Sydney in March 2008 are the major ones. Speaking to The Tribune, the elated shooter informed that she had won more than a dozen gold medals and many silver and bronze medals in various competitions she participated in at the international and national levels. Besides this, she has represented India in 12 World Cups. She scored 397 out of 400 in the World Championship, 2006 and earned an Olympic quota place for India. She is the first woman shooter from Punjab to represent India in the Beijing Olympic Games, 2008 and the first woman shooter from Punjab to win the Commonwealth and Asian Games medals. Recipient of Punjab State Award, she was conferred with the Arjuna Award by President Mrs. Pratibha Patil on 29 August 2008.

== Biography ==
Born in 1981, Avneet did her schooling from St. Joseph's Convent School in Bathinda. She started her shooting career in 2001 from the Dasmesh Girls’ College, Badal. Impressing all with her calibre, in a short span of six years, she reached the top and secured a gold and a silver medal in the 18th Commonwealth Games—2006, held at Melbourne (Australia). She started her shooting career in 2001 while pursuing her Bachelor in Computer Applications degree from Dasmesh Girls College, Badal, the native village of S. Parkash Singh Badal. She completed her master's degree in English literature in 2005. She has won around 60 medals in various national and international events. She worked as Assistant Manager in Air India. Acknowledging the glory that renowned shooter Avneet Kaur Sidhu of Bathinda has brought to her home state, the Punjab government has decided to honour her by offering the post of deputy superintendent of police (DSP).

== Personal life ==
She is married to the former Indian hockey captain Rajpal Singh and the couple have one child.
