= Avianna Chao =

Chinese-born Canadian sport shooter

Personal information
- Nationality: Canadian
- Born: May 3, 1975 (age 51) Wuhan, Hubei, China
- Height: 1.73 m (5 ft 8 in)
- Weight: 67 kg (148 lb)

Sport
- Sport: Shooting
- Events: 10 m air pistol (AP40); 25 m pistol (SP)
- Club: Aurora Gun Club
- Coached by: Patrick Haynes
Medal record
Women's shooting
Representing Canada
Commonwealth Games
Bronze medal – third place	2006 Melbourne	25 metre sport pistol pairs
Pan American Games
Gold medal – first place	2007 Rio de Janeiro	10 metre air pistol

Avianna Chao (born May 3, 1975) is a Chinese-born Canadian sport shooter. She is a gold medalist in the sport pistol at the 2007 Pan American Games in Rio de Janeiro, Brazil.

== Shooting career ==
Chao, a native of Wuhan, China, emigrated to Canada at the age of eleven. Her mother Lien Chao is a graduate of Canadian literature and English language at York University in Toronto, and also, a popular poet and author for numerous literary works, including The Maples and the Stream and The Chinese Knot.

Chao started out her shooting career in 2001 to support her fiance Patrick Haynes (now working as her personal coach), who was trying out for the national team. She claimed numerous shooting titles at the Canadian national championships, and consequently, achieved a fourth-place finish in the women's sport pistol at the 2003 Pan American Games in Santo Domingo, Dominican Republic, with a score of 666.8 points. She also captured a bronze medal in the pistol shooting pairs, along with her partner Kim Eagles, at the 2006 Commonwealth Games in Melbourne, Australia, posting a combined score of 1,130 points.

In 2007, Chao reached her breakthrough season in shooting, when she won a gold medal for the women's air pistol (AP40) at the Pan American Games in Rio de Janeiro, Brazil, accumulating a score of 468.9 targets (372 in the preliminary rounds and 96.9 in the final). Following her success from these games, Chao earned a spot on the Canadian shooting team for the Olympics.

At the 2008 Summer Olympics in Beijing, Chao competed only in two pistol shooting events. She placed thirty-ninth out of forty-four shooters in the women's 10 m air pistol, with a total score of 370 points. Three days later, Chao competed for her second event, 25 m pistol, where she was able to shoot 277 targets in the precision stage, and 281 in the rapid fire, for a total score of 558 points, finishing only in forty-first place.
