= Mário Filipovič =

Slovak sport shooter

Mário Filipovič (born 7 May 1976 is a Slovak sport shooter who specializes in the trap.

At the 2008 Olympic Games he finished in joint thirteenth place in the trap qualification, missing a place among the top six, who progressed to the final round.
