= Gyda Ellefsplass Olssen =

Norwegian sport shooter (born 1978)

Personal information
- Nationality: Norway
- Born: 16 November 1978 (age 47) Elverum, Norway
- Height: 1.64 m (5 ft 4 1/2 in)
- Weight: 59 kg (130 lb)

Sport
- Sport: Shooting
- Event(s): 10 m air rifle (AR40); 50 m rifle 3 positions (STR3X20)
- Club: Stange Sportsskyttere

Gyda Ellefsplass Olssen (born 16 November 1978, in Elverum) is a Norwegian sport shooter. At age twenty-nine, Olssen made her official debut for the 2008 Summer Olympics in Beijing, where she competed in two rifle shooting events. She placed thirty-fourth out of forty-seven shooters in the women's 10 m air rifle, with a total score of 391 points. Nearly a week later, Olssen competed for her second event, 50 m rifle 3 positions, where she was able to shoot 195 targets in a prone position, and 190 each in standing and in kneeling, for a total score of 575 points, finishing only in twenty-seventh place.
