= Stefan Rüttgeroth =

German sport shooter (born 1981)

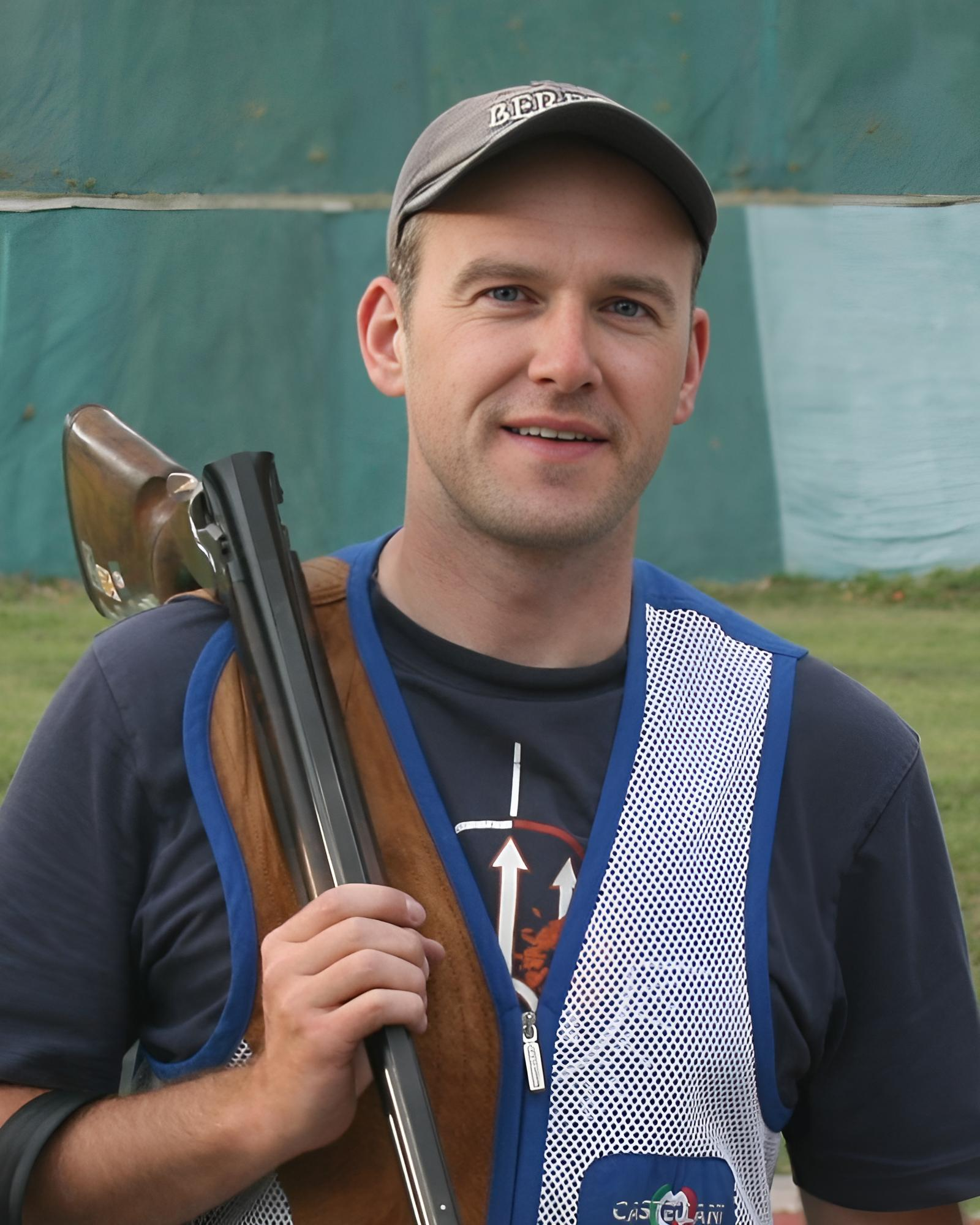

Personal information
- Nationality: Germany
- Born: 4 March 1981 (age 45) Göttingen, Lower Saxony, West Germany
- Height: 1.84 m (6 ft 1/2 in)
- Weight: 82 kg (181 lb)

Sport
- Sport: Shooting
- Event(s): Trap, double trap
- Club: SSC Gieboldehausen
- Coached by: Hans Krüger

Stefan Rüttgeroth (born 4 March 1981 in Göttingen, Lower Saxony) is a German sport shooter. He won a gold medal for the men's trap shooting at the 2006 ISSF World Cup in Cairo, Egypt, and bronze at the 2011 ISSF World Cup in Sydney, Australia, accumulating a score of 142 clay pigeons each.

Ruttgeroth represented Germany at the 2008 Summer Olympics in Beijing, where he competed in the men's trap shooting, along with his teammate Karsten Bindrich. He scored a total of 113 clay pigeons in the preliminary rounds of the event, by one point behind U.S. shooter Dominic Grazioli from the final attempt, finishing only in twenty-fourth place.
