= Oleksandr Lazeykin =

Ukrainian sport shooter

Personal information
- Full name: Oleksandr Valeriyovych Lazeykin
- Nationality: Ukraine
- Born: 22 November 1982 (age 43) Vasylivka, Bilohirsk Raion, Crimean Oblast, Ukrainian SSR
- Height: 1.72 m (5 ft 7 1/2 in)
- Weight: 62 kg (137 lb)

Sport
- Sport: Shooting
- Event: 10 m air rifle (AR60)
- Club: Dynamo Simferopol

Oleksandr Valeriyovych Lazeykin (Ukrainian: Олександр Валерійович Лазейкин; born 22 November 1982) is a Ukrainian sport shooter. Lazeykin represented Ukraine at the 2008 Summer Olympics in Beijing, where he competed in the men's 10 m air rifle, along with his teammate Artur Ayvazyan. He finished only in eleventh place by one point behind Austria's Thomas Farnik from the final attempt, for a total score of 594 targets.
