= Irene Beyeler =

Swiss sport shooter (born 1985)

Personal information
- Nationality: Switzerland
- Born: 11 August 1985 (age 40) Schwarzenburg, Bern, Switzerland
- Height: 1.64 m (5 ft 4 1/2 in)
- Weight: 54 kg (119 lb)

Sport
- Sport: Shooting
- Event(s): 10 m air rifle (AR40); 50 m rifle 3 positions (STR3X20)
- Club: Sportschützen Taters
- Coached by: Walter Beyeler

Irene Beyeler (born 11 August 1985 in Schwarzenburg, Bern) is a Swiss sport shooter. Beyeler represented Switzerland at the 2008 Summer Olympics in Beijing, where she competed in rifle shooting events, along with her brother and teammate Simon Beyeler. She placed sixteenth out of forty-seven shooters in the women's 10 m air rifle by one point behind United States' Emily Caruso from the third attempt, with a total score of 395 points. Nearly a week later, Beyeler competed for her second event, 50 m rifle 3 positions, where she was able to shoot 195 targets in a prone position, 188 in standing, and 194 in kneeling, for a total score of 577 points, finishing only in twenty-third place.
