= Yves Tronc =

French sport shooter

Yves Tronc (born 30 June 1960 in Sallanches) is a French sport shooter who specializes in the trap.

At the 2008 Olympic Games he finished in joint thirteenth place in the trap qualification, missing a place among the top six, who progressed to the final round. He also competed at the 2004 Olympic Games.
