= Annik Marguet =

Swiss sports shooter

Annik Marguet (born 30 June 1981 in Ménières) is a Swiss sports-shooter. She competed for Switzerland at the 2008 Summer Olympics in the 10m air rifle and 50m rifle three positions events, but did not advance to the final in either. At the 2012 Summer Olympics she competed in the same events, with the same result.
