= Marco Matellini =

Peruvian sport shooter (born 1972)

Personal information
- Full name: Marco Rodolfo Matellini Walker
- Nationality: Peru
- Born: 18 January 1972 (age 54) Lima, Peru
- Height: 1.85 m (6 ft 1 in)
- Weight: 89 kg (196 lb)

Sport
- Sport: Shooting
- Event: Skeet

Marco Rodolfo Matellini Walker (born January 18, 1972, in Lima) is a Peruvian sport shooter. At age thirty-six, Matellini made his official debut for the 2008 Summer Olympics in Beijing, where he competed in the men's skeet shooting. He finished only in fortieth place by four points ahead of Syria's Roger Dahi, for a total score of 95 targets.
