= Manuel Silva (sport shooter) =

Portuguese sports shooter

Personal information
- Full name: Manuel Moura Vieira da Silva
- Nationality: Portugal
- Born: 16 November 1971 (age 54) Porto, Portugal
- Height: 1.83 m (6 ft 0 in)
- Weight: 85 kg (187 lb)

Sport
- Sport: Shooting
- Event: Trap
- Club: Clube Industrial de Pevidém
- Coached by: Manuel Ricardo
Medal record
Men's shooting
Representing Portugal
World Championships
| Bronze medal – third place | 1999 Tampere | Trap |

Manuel Moura Vieira da Silva (born November 16, 1971, in Porto) is a Portuguese sport shooter. He won a bronze medal at the 1999 ISSF World Shotgun Championships in Tampere, Finland, and eventually captured a total of six medals (one gold, two silver, and three bronze) for the men's trap shooting at the ISSF World Cup series. He also competed in the mixed trap shooting at the 1992 Summer Olympics in Barcelona, and men's trap at the 1996 Summer Olympics in Atlanta.

Twelve years after competing in his last Olympics, Silva qualified for his third Portuguese team, as a 36-year-old, at the 2008 Summer Olympics in Beijing, by winning the silver medal from the first meet of the 2006 ISSF World Cup series in Qingyuan, China, with a score of 145 points. He finished only in twenty-seventh place by one point behind Canada's Giuseppe di Salvatore, for a total score of 111 targets.

== Olympic results ==
Olympic results
| Event | 1992 | 1996 | 2008 |
|---|---|---|---|
| Trap | 11th 193 | 7th 122 | 27th 111 |
