= Kai Jahnsson =

Finnish sport shooter

Kai Jahnsson (born January 25, 1965, in Helsinki, Finland) is a Finnish sport shooter who competes in the men's 10 metre air pistol. At the 2012 Summer Olympics, he finished 8th in the final round. He works for the Finnish Border Guard, is married and has three children.
