= Li Yang (sport shooter) =

Chinese sport shooter

Medal record

Men's shooting

Representing China

Asian Championships
Silver medal – second place	2015 Kuwait City	Trap team

Li Yang (born 20 August 1985 in Beijing) is a male Chinese sports shooter.

He competed in the trap event for Team China at the 2008 Summer Olympics. Finishing sixteenth in the qualification, he did not reach the final. He belongs to the Beijing Shooting School.
