= Craig Henwood =

Australian sport shooter (born 1978)

Personal information
- Nationality: Australia
- Born: 10 December 1978 (age 47) Melbourne, Victoria, Australia
- Height: 1.78 m (5 ft 10 in)
- Weight: 109 kg (240 lb)

Sport
- Sport: Shooting
- Event(s): Trap, double trap
- Club: Melbourne Gun Club
- Coached by: Jack Henwood

Craig Henwood (born 10 December 1978 in Melbourne, Victoria) is an Australian sport shooter. He won a gold medal for the men's trap shooting at the 2005 Oceanian Shooting Championships in Brisbane, accumulating a score of 143 clay pigeons. Henwood is a member of the Melbourne Gun Club, and is coached and trained by his father Jack Henwood.

Henwood represented Australia at the 2008 Summer Olympics in Beijing, where he competed in the men's trap shooting, along with his teammate and five-time Olympian Michael Diamond. He scored a total of 109 clay pigeons in the preliminary rounds of the event, by one point ahead of Egypt's Adham Medhat, finishing only in thirty-first place.
