= Suzana Cimbal Špirelja =

Croatian sport shooter

Personal information
- Nationality: Croatia
- Born: 18 November 1975 (age 50) Zagreb, SR Croatia, SFR Yugoslavia
- Height: 1.68 m (5 ft 6 in)
- Weight: 60 kg (132 lb)

Sport
- Sport: Shooting
- Event(s): 10 m air rifle (AR40); 50 m rifle 3 positions (STR3X20)
- Club: HAŠK Mladost (CRO)
- Coached by: Miroslav Pavlakovic

Suzana Cimbal Špirelja (born November 18, 1975, in Zagreb) is a Croatian sport shooter. She is also a full-time member at HAŠK Mladost Shooting Club, and is currently coached and trained by Miroslav Pavlakovic.

At age thirty-three, Spirelja made her official debut for the 2008 Summer Olympics in Beijing, where she competed in two rifle shooting events. She placed thirtieth out of forty-seven shooters in the women's 10 m air rifle, with a total score of 393 points. Nearly a week later, Spirelja competed for her second event, 50 m rifle 3 positions, where she was able to shoot 199 targets in a prone position, 192 in standing, and 189 in kneeling, for a total score of 580 points, finishing only in twelfth place.
