= Véronique Girardet =

French sport shooter

Personal information
- Nationality: France
- Born: 10 September 1965 (age 60) Besançon, Doubs, France
- Height: 1.60 m (5 ft 3 in)
- Weight: 51 kg (112 lb)

Sport
- Sport: Shooting
- Event: Skeet
- Club: ST Castillonnaise
- Coached by: Bruno Rossetti, Antony Szewc
Medal record
Women's shooting
Representing France
World Championships
Gold medal – first place	2005 Lonato	Skeet

Véronique Girardet (born September 10, 1965 in Besançon) is a French sport shooter. She set a world record of 96 targets by winning the gold medal for women's skeet shooting at the 2005 ISSF World Championships in Lonato, Italy.

At age forty-two, Girardet made her official debut for the 2008 Summer Olympics in Beijing, where she competed in women's skeet shooting. She placed sixteenth out of nineteen shooters in the qualifying rounds of the event, with a total score of 63 points.

At the 2012 Summer Olympics in London, Girardet improved her performance from the previous games by hitting a total of 66 targets in women's skeet, finishing only in tenth place, behind Kazakhstan's Angelina Mishchuk.

Girardet is also a member of ST Castillonnaise for the shooting class, and is coached and trained by Bruno Rossetti and Antony Szewc.
