= Irena Tanova =

Bulgarian sport shooter

Personal information
- Nationality: Bulgaria
- Born: 2 August 1984 (age 41) Stara Zagora, Bulgaria
- Height: 1.68 m (5 ft 6 in)
- Weight: 61 kg (134 lb)

Sport
- Sport: Shooting
- Event(s): 10 m air pistol (AP40); 25 m pistol (SP)

Irena Tanova (Bulgarian: Ирена Танова; born August 2, 1984, in Stara zagora) is a Bulgarian sport shooter. Tanova represented Bulgaria at the 2008 Summer Olympics in Beijing, where she competed in two pistol shooting events. She placed thirty-second out of forty-four shooters in the women's 10 m air pistol, with a total score of 377 points. Three days later, Tanova competed for her second event, 25 m pistol, where she was able to shoot 280 targets in the precision stage, and 289 in the rapid fire, for a total score of 569 points, finishing only in thirty-seventh place.
