= Huang Yi-ling =

Taiwanese sport shooter

Huang Yi-Ling
Personal information
- Nationality: Chinese Taipei
- Born: 2 August 1985 (age 40)
- Height: 1.65 m (5 ft 5 in)
- Weight: 55 kg (121 lb)

Sport
- Sport: Shooting
- Event(s): 10 m air pistol (AP40); 25 m pistol (SP)
Medal record
Women's shooting
Representing Chinese Taipei
Asian Championships
Bronze medal – third place	2007 Kuwait City	10 m air pistol

Huang Yi-Ling (Chinese: 黃逸伶; pinyin: Huáng Yìlíng; born August 2, 1985) is a Taiwanese sport shooter. Huang represented Chinese Taipei at the 2008 Summer Olympics in Beijing, where she competed in two pistol shooting events. She placed twenty-second out of forty-four shooters in the women's 10 m air pistol, with a total score of 379 points. Three days later, Tanova competed for her second event, 25 m pistol, where she was able to shoot 281 targets in the precision stage, and 282 in the rapid fire, for a total score of 563 points, finishing only in thirty-ninth place.
