= Claudia Verdicchio-Krause =

German sport shooter (born 1975)

Personal information
- Born: 24 May 1975 (age 51) Freiburg, West Germany

Claudia Verdicchio-Krause (born 24 May 1975 in Freiburg) is a German sport shooter. At the 2012 Summer Olympics, she competed in the Women's 10 metre air pistol and the Women's 25 metre pistol, finishing 20th in the 10 metre event and 26th in the 50 metre event.
