= Jesús Serrano (sport shooter) =

Spanish sport shooter

Jesús Serrano (born 3 July 1978) is a Spanish sport shooter who specializes in trap.

At the 2008 Olympic Games he finished in joint tenth place in the trap qualification, missing a place among the top six, who progressed to the final round.

At the 2012 Olympic Games he qualified for the final round. After the final round he finished in fifth place.
