= Viktoria Chaika =

Belarusian sport shooter (born 1980)

Personal information
- Born: 26 December 1980 (age 45) Marhanets, Ukrainian SSR
- Height: 1.64 m (5 ft 5 in)
- Weight: 49 kg (108 lb)

Sport
- Sport: Sports shooting
Medal record
Representing Belarus
ISSF World Shooting Championships
| Gold medal – first place | 1998 Barcelona | 10 m Air Pistol Women |
| Bronze medal – third place | 2010 Munich | 10 m Air Pistol Women |
| Bronze medal – third place | 2006 Zagreb | 10 m Air Pistol Women |

Viktoria Uladzimirauna Chaika (Вікторыя Уладзіміраўна Чайка, born 26 December 1980) is a Belarusian female sport shooter. At the 2012 Summer Olympics, she competed in the Women's 10 metre air pistol, finishing fifth, and the Women's 25 metre pistol, finishing 25th. She also competed at the 2008, 2004 and 2000 Olympic games in the 10 metre air pistol (finishing in 4th, 16th and 11th respectively) and the 2008 and 2004 Games in the 25 metre pistol events (finishing in 13th and 32nd respectively).
