= Christoph Schmid =

Swiss sport shooter

Personal information
- Nationality: Switzerland
- Born: 5 August 1982 (age 43) Zug, Switzerland
- Height: 1.90 m (6 ft 3 in)
- Weight: 82 kg (181 lb)

Sport
- Sport: Shooting
- Event(s): 10 m air pistol (AP60); 50 m pistol (FP)
- Club: PS Brunnen
- Coached by: Krzysztof Kucharczyk

Christoph Schmid (born 5 August 1982 in Zug) is a Swiss sport shooter. He won a silver medal in the men's 50 m free pistol at the 2007 ISSF World Cup series in Fort Benning, Georgia, accumulating a score of 659.7 points.

== Career ==
Schmid represented Switzerland at the 2008 Summer Olympics in Beijing, where he competed in two pistol shooting events. He scored a total of 573 targets in the preliminary rounds of the men's 10 m air pistol, by two points behind Australia's Daniel Repacholi from the final attempt, finishing in thirty-third place. Three days later, Schmid placed fortieth in his second event, 50 m pistol, by one point behind Poland's Wojciech Knapik, with a total score of 542 targets.
