= Anita Tóth =

Hungarian sport shooter

Personal information
- Full name: Anita Csíkné Tóth
- Nationality: Hungary
- Born: 12 November 1979 (age 46) Szolnok, Hungary
- Height: 1.68 m (5 ft 6 in)
- Weight: 56 kg (123 lb)

Sport
- Sport: Shooting
- Event(s): 10 m air rifle (AR40); 50 m rifle 3 positions (STR3X20)
- Club: UTE

Anita Csíkné Tóth (born November 12, 1979) is a Hungarian sport shooter. Toth represented Hungary at the 2008 Summer Olympics in Beijing, where she competed for two rifle shooting events. She placed thirty-fifth out of forty-seven shooters in the women's 10 m air rifle, with a total score of 390 points. Nearly a week later, Toth competed for her second event, 50 m rifle 3 positions, where she was able to shoot 194 targets in a prone position, 187 in standing, and 188 in kneeling, for a total score of 569 points, finishing only in thirty-seventh place.
