= Pavla Kalná =

Czech sport shooter (born 1982)

Personal information
- Full name: Pavla (Habartová) Kalná
- Nationality: Czech Republic
- Born: 14 November 1982 (age 43) Planá, Czechoslovakia
- Height: 1.72 m (5 ft 7 1/2 in)
- Weight: 95 kg (209 lb)

Sport
- Sport: Shooting
- Events: 10 m air rifle (AR40); 50 m rifle 3 positions (STR3X20)
- Club: ŠKP Rapid Plzeň
- Coached by: Petr Kurka

Pavla Kalná (née Habartová; born 14 November 1982) is a Czech sport shooter. She won two silver medals for the air rifle (AR40) at the ISSF World Cup series (2005 in Munich, Germany, and 2006 in Resende, Rio de Janeiro, Brazil).

Kalna represented the Czech Republic at the 2008 Summer Olympics in Beijing, where she competed in the women's 10 m air rifle, along with her teammate Kateřina Emmons, who later dominated this event by winning the gold medal. She finished only in thirty-first place by three points ahead of Uzbekistan's Elena Kuznetsova from the final attempt, for a total score of 392 targets.
