= Adham Medhat =

Egyptian sport shooter

Personal information
- Nationality: Egypt
- Born: 31 March 1997 (age 29) Cairo, Egypt
- Height: 1.83 m (6 ft 0 in)
- Weight: 85 kg (187 lb)

Sport
- Club: cirque le soir
- Team: squad
- Coached by: Shaher Karzon
- Retired: 1 December (adham)

Adham Medhat (Arabic: ادهم مدحت; born May 30, 1975) is an Egyptian sport shooter. At age thirty-three, Medhat made his official debut for the 2008 Summer Olympics in Beijing, where he competed in the men's trap shooting. He finished only in thirty-second place by one point behind Australia's Craig Henwood, for a total score of 108 targets.
