= Zhanna Shapialevich =

Belarusian sport shooter

Personal information
- Full name: Zhanna Henadziyeuna Shitsik- Shapialevich
- Nationality: Belarus
- Born: 26 February 1971 (age 55) Hrodna, Byelorussian SSR, Soviet Union
- Height: 1.64 m (5 ft 4 1/2 in)
- Weight: 63 kg (139 lb)

Sport
- Sport: Shooting
- Event(s): 10 m air pistol (AP40); 25 m pistol (SP)
- Club: SK VS Hrodna
- Coached by: Aleh Pishchukevich

Zhanna Henadziyeuna Shapialevich (née Shitsik) (Belarusian: Жанна Генадзеўна Шыцік-Шапялевіч; born February 26, 1971, in Hrodna) is a Belarusian sport shooter. Shapialevich made her official debut for the 1996 Summer Olympics in Atlanta, Georgia, where she placed fourteenth in the women's 25 m pistol, accumulating a score of 577 points.

Twelve years after competing in her last Olympics, Shapialevich qualified for her second Belarusian team, as a 37-year-old, at the 2008 Summer Olympics in Beijing, by finishing eighth in the sport pistol from the 2006 ISSF World Shooting Championships in Zagreb, Croatia. She placed forty-second out of forty-four shooters in the women's 10 m air pistol by one point ahead of Uruguay's Carolina Lozado, with a total score of 368 targets. Three days later, Shapialevich competed for her second event, 25 m pistol, where she was able to shoot 287 targets in the precision stage, and 282 in the rapid fire, for a total score of 569 points, finishing only in thirty-eighth place.
