= Sonia Franquet =

Spanish sport shooter

Personal information
- Born: 3 July 1980 (age 44)

Sport
- Country: Spain
- Sport: Shooting sports

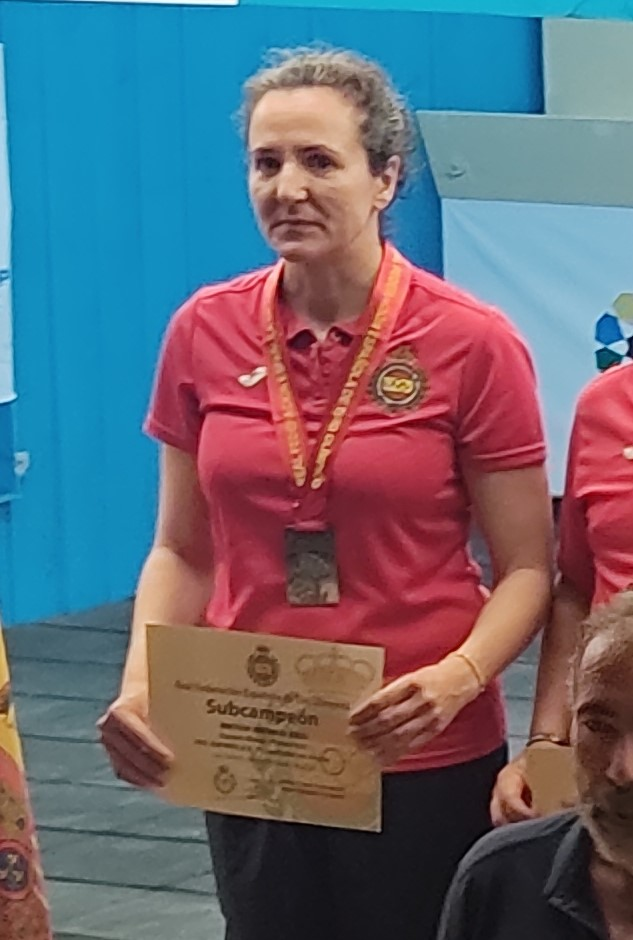
Sonia Franquet

Sonia Franquet is a Spanish female sport shooter. At the 2008, 2012 and 2016 Summer Olympics, she competed in the Women's 10 metre air pistol and Women's 25 metre pistol.
