= Agnieszka Nagay =

Polish sport shooter (born 1981)

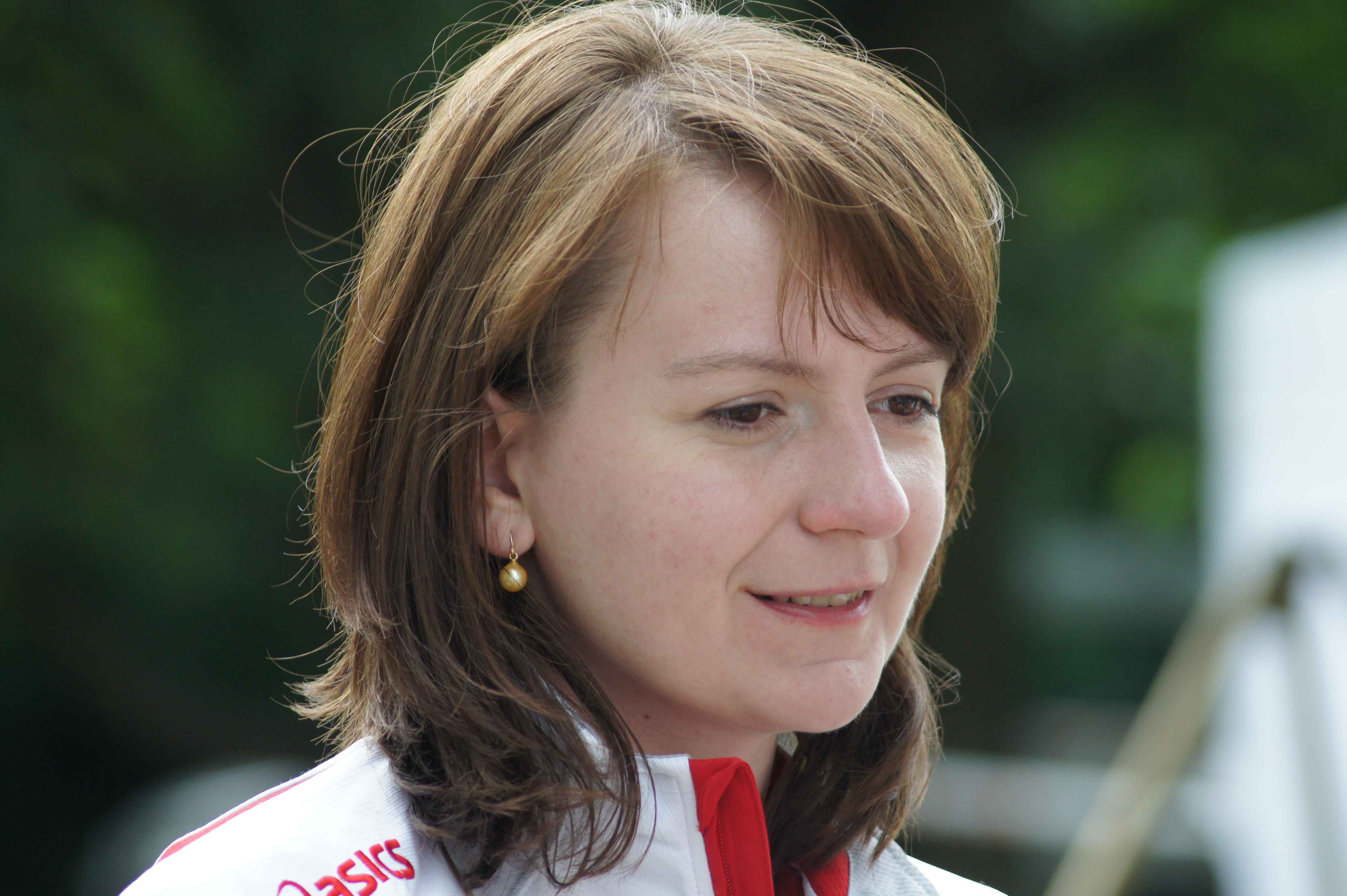

Medal record

Women's shooting

Representing Poland

European Championships
Gold medal – first place	2015 Maribor	50 m rifle 3 pos. team
Silver medal – second place	2008 Winterthur	10 m air rifle
Bronze medal – third place	2005 Tallinn	10 m air rifle
Bronze medal – third place	2013 Osijek	50 m rifle 3 pos. team

Agnieszka Nagay (née Staroń, born 20 February 1981 in Łódź) is a Polish rifle shooter and soldier. She competed in the 50 m rifle three positions event at the 2012 Summer Olympics, where she placed 8th in the final. She won a bronze medal at the 2005 European Championships, and has finished 2nd (Changwon 2011) and 3rd (Munich 2008) at World Cup Events.

== Olympic results ==
Event	2004	2008	2012	2016
50 metre rifle three positions	—	11th 581	8th 584+94.2	16th 578
10 metre air rifle	14th 394	25th 393	—	29th 412.8
