= Chen Ying (sport shooter) =

Chinese sport shooter

Medal record

Women's shooting

Representing China

Olympic Games
Gold medal – first place	2008 Beijing	25 m Pistol
Silver medal – second place	2012 London	25 m Pistol

Asian Championships
Gold medal – first place	2007 Kuwait City	25 m pistol
Gold medal – first place	2007 Kuwait City	25 m pistol team
Gold medal – first place	2012 Doha	25 m pistol
Gold medal – first place	2012 Doha	25 m pistol team
Silver medal – second place	2012 Doha	10 m air pistol
Silver medal – second place	2012 Doha	10 m air pistol team
Silver medal – second place	2015 Kuwait City	25 m pistol team

Chen Ying (simplified Chinese: 陈颖; traditional Chinese: 陳穎; pinyin: Chén Yǐng; born November 4, 1977, in Beijing) is a female Chinese sports shooter who won the gold medal at the 2008 Summer Olympics and at the 2006 ISSF World Shooting Championships in 25 m Pistol.

In the 2004 Summer Olympics she finished fourth in the women's 25 metre pistol competition.

She won silver medal in the women's 25 meter air pistol at the 2012 Summer Olympics.

Current world records held in 25 m Pistol
Women (ISSF)	Teams	1768	China (Chen, Li, Tao)	October 4, 2002	Busan (KOR)
