= Michaela Musilová (sport shooter) =

Czech sport shooter (born 1989)

Personal information
- Nationality: Czech Republic
- Born: 25 September 1989 (age 36) České Budějovice, Czechoslovakia
- Height: 1.70 m (5 ft 7 in)
- Weight: 57 kg (126 lb)

Sport
- Sport: Shooting
- Events: 10 m air pistol (AP40); 25 m pistol (SP)
- Club: ASO Dukla Plzeň

Michaela Musilová (born 25 September 1989) is a Czech sport shooter.

== Career ==
Musilová represented the Czech Republic at the 2008 Summer Olympics in Beijing, where she competed in two pistol shooting events, along with her teammate Lenka Marušková. She placed thirty-fifth out of forty-four shooters in the women's 10 m air pistol, with a total score of 375 points. Three days later, Musilova competed for her second event, 25 m pistol, where she was able to shoot 288 targets in the precision stage, and 283 in the rapid fire, for a total score of 571 points, finishing only in thirty-fourth place.
