= Stéphane Clamens =

French sports shooter (born 1971)

Stéphane Clamens (born 5 June 1971) is a French sport shooter who specializes in the trap.

At the 2004 Olympic Games he finished in joint seventh place in the trap qualification, missing a place among the top six, who progressed to the final round. He also competed at the 2008 and 2012 Olympic games.

Olympic results
Event	2000	2004	2008	2012
Trap	30th 107	9th 119	25th 112	19th 119
