= Desislava Balabanova =

Bulgarian sport shooter (born 1988)

Personal information
- Nationality: Bulgaria
- Born: 25 November 1988 (age 37) Sofia, Bulgaria
- Height: 1.65 m (5 ft 5 in)
- Weight: 58 kg (128 lb)

Sport
- Sport: Shooting
- Event(s): 10 m air rifle (AR40); 50 m rifle 3 positions (STR3X20)

Desislava Balabanova (Bulgarian: Десислава Балабанова; born November 25, 1988, in Sofia) is a Bulgarian sport shooter. Balabanova represented Bulgaria at the 2008 Summer Olympics in Beijing, where she competed in two rifle shooting events. She placed twenty-sixth out of forty-seven shooters in the women's 10 m air rifle, with a total score of 393 points. Nearly a week later, Balabanova competed for her second event, 50 m rifle 3 positions, where she was able to shoot 192 targets in a kneeling position, and 191 each in prone and in standing, for a total score of 574 points, finishing only in twenty-eighth place.
