= Yury Dauhapolau =

Belarusian sport shooter

Yury Viktaravich Dauhapolau (Belarusian: Юрый Віктаравіч Даўгаполау, born 20 June 1970 in Voskresenovka, Lipetsk) is a Belarusian sport shooter who competes in the men's 10 metre air pistol. At the 2012 Summer Olympics, he finished 30th in the qualifying round, failing to make the cut for the final.
