= Juan Carlos Dasque =

Argentine sport shooter

Personal information
- Born: 12 October 1952 (age 73) Buenos Aires, Argentina
Medal record
Men's shooting
Representing Argentina
Pan American Games
Gold medal – first place	2007 Rio de Janeiro	Olympic Trap

Juan Carlos Dasque (born 12 October 1952) is an Argentine sport shooter who specializes in double trap and trap.

At the 2008 Olympic Games he finished in joint thirteenth place in the trap qualification, missing a place among the top six, who progressed to the final round.
