= Lindita Kodra =

Albanian sport shooter (born 1962)

Sport
- Sport: Shooting
Medal record
European Championships
Gold medal – first place	2007 Granada	25m Pistol Women
- Updated on 25 August 2015

Lindita Kodra (born 11 May 1962) is an Albanian shooter who represented her country in the 10m air pistol and 25m pistol events at the 2008 Summer Olympics.

She also competed in the 2006 ISSF World Shooting Championships in Zagreb, Croatia, in the 10 m Air Pistol event, in which she finished 27th overall with 376 points. In 2007, she finished 15th overall with 579 points in the same competition in Munich, Germany, and 34th overall with 568 points in the same competition in the United States. The best result of her career was her first place in 25m Pistol event at the European Championships in Granada, Spain, in 2007, where she became European champion at the age of 45.
