= Graeme Ede =

New Zealand sport shooter

Medal record

Representing New Zealand

Men's Shooting

Commonwealth Games
Gold medal – first place	2006 Melbourne	Trap

Graeme Ede (born 7 February 1960) is a shooting competitor for New Zealand. At the 2006 Commonwealth Games he won a gold medal in the shooting - trap event. He previously competed at the 1994 Commonwealth Games in Victoria, British Columbia, Canada.

At the 2008 Beijing Olympics, he finished 18th in qualification in double trap and 20th in qualification for trap.
