= Florian Schmidt =

German sport shooter (born 1986)

Florian Schmidt (born 31 March 1986 in Frankfurt an der Oder) is a German sport shooter who competes in the men's 10 metre air pistol and the men's 50 metre pistol. At the 2008 Summer Olympics, he finished 37th in the 10 metre air pistol and 28th in the 50 metre pistol. At the 2012 Summer Olympics, he finished 25th in the qualifying round for the 10 metre air pistol, failing to make the cut for the final, and 17th in the 50 metre pistol.
