= Zsófia Csonka =

Hungarian sports shooter

Zsófia Csonka (born 12 September 1983 in Pécs) is a Hungarian sport-shooter who competed at the 2004, 2008, 2012 Summer Olympics and 2016 Summer Olympics. She qualified for the 2012 Summer Olympics for 25 m pistol women at the Munich shooting world cup event. Her best result came at the 2012 Summer Olympics where she finished 6th in the 25 m pistol event, reaching the final of an event for the first time.
