= Lalita Yauhleuskaya =

Russian sports shooter (born 1963)

Medal record

Women's shooting

Representing Belarus

Olympic Games
Bronze medal – third place	2000 Sydney	25 m pistol

Representing Australia

Commonwealth Games
Gold medal – first place	2002 Manchester	Sport pistol
Gold medal – first place	2002 Manchester	Sport pistol pairs
Gold medal – first place	2002 Manchester	Air pistol
Gold medal – first place	2006 Melbourne	10 m pistol
Gold medal – first place	2006 Melbourne	10 m pistol pairs
Gold medal – first place	2006 Melbourne	25 m pistol
Gold medal – first place	2006 Melbourne	25 m pistol pairs
Silver medal – second place	2010 Dehli	25 m pistol pairs
Bronze medal – third place	2002 Manchester	Air pistol pairs
Bronze medal – third place	2014 Glasgow	25 m pistol

Commonwealth Championships
Gold medal – first place	2017 Brisbane	25 m pistol

Lalita Yauhleuskaya (born 31 December 1963 in Sokol, Russia) is a professional sporting shooter who won a bronze medal at the 2000 Summer Olympics in Sydney representing Belarus and currently represents Australia in international competition.

Yauhleuskaya began competitive shooting at age 13. In 1986, representing the Soviet Union, she finished 5th in the women's 10 metre air pistol at the ISSF World Shooting Championships in Suhl, Germany. Ten years later she was selected in the Belarusian team for the Atlanta Olympics where she placed 8th in the 10m air pistol. Four years later she picked up a bronze medal in the women's 25 metre pistol at the Sydney Olympics. She became an Australian citizen after the Sydney Olympics and represented her new country in Athens and Beijing. She was also selected for the Australian team for the 2012 Summer Olympics in London, finishing 40th in the women's 10 m air pistol and 17th in the women's 25 m pistol. In 2014 Commonwealth Games, she clinched a bronze medal in women’s 25-metre pistol event.

Shooting success runs in the family. Lalita’s son; Sergei Evglevski represents Australia and is very successful in his own right. He competed at the Tokyo 2020 Olympics.
