= Shooting at the 2012 Summer Olympics – Qualification =

Shooting was one of the sport contested in competitions at the 2012 Summer Olympics in London. There were a variety of categories for both men and women using a number of firearms. Those who qualified at various competitions went on to compete for medals at the games themselves.

Nation	Men									Women						Total	
Nation	FR 3x40	FR 60PR	AR 60	FP	RFP	AP 60	TR 125	DT 150	SK 125	STR 3x20	AR 40	SP	AP 40	TR 75	SK 75	Quotas	Athletes
Albania				1		1										2	1
Algeria						1										1	1
Andorra							1									1	1
Armenia						1										1	1
Argentina		2														2	2
Australia	1	2	1	1	1	1	2	1	2	2	2	2	2	1	1	22	17
Austria	1	2	1				1			1	1					7	4
Azerbaijan												1	1			2	1
Bahrain										1						1	1
Bangladesh											1					1	1
Belarus	2	2	2	2		2	1					1	1			13	9
Belgium		1														1	1
Bhutan											1					1	1
Bolivia							1									1	1
Bosnia and Herzegovina	1	1	1													3	1
Brazil								1			1	1				3	2
Bulgaria	1	1	1							1	1	2	2			9	4
Canada		1	1										1			3	2
Chile															1	1	1
China	2	2	2	2	2	2	1	2		2	2	2	2	1	1	25	23
Colombia							1									1	1
Croatia	1	1	2				2	1		1	1					9	5
Cuba					1				1	2	2					6	4
Cyprus									2						1	3	3
Czech Republic	1	1	1		2		2		2	2	2	1	1			15	10
Denmark		1							2	1	2					6	5
Dominican Republic							1	1								2	1
Ecuador											1					1	1
Egypt			1			1	1		2		1				1	7	7
El Salvador										1	1					2	1
Estonia										1	1					2	1
Fiji							1									1	1
Finland				1		1				1	1		1	1		6	4
France	2	2	2	2		2	1		1	2	2	2	2	1	1	22	14
Georgia												1	1			2	1
Germany	2	2	2	2	2	1	1		1	2	2	2	2	1	1	23	17
Great Britain	2	2	1				1	2	2	1	1	1	1	1	1	16	11
Greece									2				1			3	3
Guatemala				1		1	1									3	2
Honduras													1			1	1
Hong Kong													1			1	1
Hungary	1	1	1					1				1	1			6	3
Iceland				1		1										2	1
India	2	2	2		1	1	1	1				2	2	1		15	11
Indonesia											1					1	1
Iran				1		1					2	2				6	3
Iraq													1			1	1
Ireland							1									1	1
Israel		1	1													2	1
Italy	2	2	2	2		2	2	2	2	2	2			1	1	22	15
Japan	1	1	1	1		1						1	1	1		8	4
Kazakhstan				1		1			1	1					1	5	3
Kyrgyzstan	1		1													2	1
Kuwait							2	1	1	1	1					6	4
Latvia					1											1	1
Lebanon														1		1	1
Lithuania														1		1	1
Luxembourg											1					1	1
Malaysia											1					1	1
Malta								1								1	1
Mexico									1	1	1		1			4	4
Moldova													1			1	1
Mongolia	1	1	1									1	1			5	2
Montenegro				1		1										2	1
Morocco														1		1	1
Myanmar						1										1	1
Namibia														1		1	1
Nepal											1					1	1
Netherlands	1	1	1													3	1
New Zealand											1					1	1
North Korea												1	1			2	1
Norway	2	2	2						1	1	1					9	6
Oman								1								1	1
Pakistan									1							1	1
Peru									1							1	1
Philippines									1							1	1
Poland										2	2	1	1			6	4
Portugal				1		1						1	1			4	2
Puerto Rico								1								1	1
Qatar							1		1	1						3	3
Romania			1												1	2	2
Russia	2	2	2	2	2	2	2	2	1	2	2	2	2	1	1	27	22
San Marino														1		1	1
Saudi Arabia									1							1	1
Serbia	1	1	1	2		2				2	2	2	2			15	8
Singapore										1	1					2	1
Slovakia	1	1	1	2		2	1			1	1			1	1	12	7
Slovenia	1	1					1			1	1					5	3
South Africa								1								1	1
South Korea	2	2	2	2	1	2			1	2	2	2	2	1		21	13
Spain	1	1	1	1	1	1	2		1			1	1	1		12	8
Sri Lanka		1	1													2	1
Sweden								1	2						1	4	4
Switzerland	2	2	2			1			1	1	1	1	1			12	7
Syria											1					1	1
Chinese Taipei												1	2	1		4	3
Tajikistan						1										1	1
Thailand				1	1	1						2	2		1	8	4
Trinidad and Tobago				1		1										2	1
Tunisia													1			1	1
Turkey				2		2	1							1	1	7	5
Ukraine	2	2	2	1	1	2				2	2	1	1			16	9
United Arab Emirates							1	1	1							3	3
United States	2	2	2	2	2	2		2	2	2	2	1	1	2	1	25	20
Uruguay			1													1	1
Uzbekistan										1	1					2	1
Venezuela												1	1			2	1
Vietnam				1		1						1	1			4	2
Total: 108 NOCs	41	50	47	38	18	44	34	24	36	47	56	39	49	22	17	523	390

== Qualification timeline ==
Event	Date	Venue
2010 ISSF World Shooting Championships	July 29 – August 11, 2010	(Germany) Munich
2010 American Continental Championships	November 18–28, 2010	(Brazil) Rio de Janeiro
2011 ISSF World Cup # 1	March 1–10, 2011	(Chile) Concepción
2011 ISSF World Cup # 2	March 21–30, 2011	(Australia) Sydney
2011 ISSF World Cup # 3	April 11–19, 2011	(South Korea) Changwon
2011 ISSF World Cup # 4	April 19–28, 2011	(China) Beijing
2011 ISSF World Cup # 5	May 14–22, 2011	(United States) Fort Benning
2011 African Continental Championships (shotgun)	May 25 – June 3, 2011	(Morocco) Rabat
2011 ISSF World Cup # 6	June 16–23, 2011	(Germany) Munich
2011 ISSF World Cup # 7	July 7–17, 2011	(Slovenia) Maribor
2011 European Shooting Championships	July 31 – August 14, 2011	(Serbia) Belgrade
2011 ISSF World Shotgun Championships	September 3–14, 2011	(Serbia) Belgrade
2011 Pan American Games	October 15–23, 2011	(Mexico) Guadalajara
2011 African Continental Championships (rifle & pistol)	October 15–25, 2011	(Egypt) Cairo*
2011 Oceania Continental Championships	November 27 – December 4, 2011	(Australia) Sydney
2012 Asian Continental Championships	January 11–22, 2012	(Qatar) Doha
2012 European Championships 10m events	February 14–20, 2012	(Finland) Vierumäki

* This event was scheduled for February, but was postponed due to the 2011 Egyptian protests.

== 50 m rifle 3 positions men ==
Event	Quota places	Qualified athlete	Announced competitor
Host nation	Great Britain		James Huckle
2010 World Championships	France	Cyril Graff	Cyril Graff
2010 World Championships	Russia	Konstantin Prikhodtchenko	Denis Sokolov
2010 World Championships	South Korea	Han Jin-seop	Han Jin-seop
2010 World Championships	South Korea	Kim Jong-Hyun	Kim Jong-hyun
2010 World Championships	Serbia	Nemanja Mirosavljev	Nemanja Mirosavljev
2010 American Continental Championships	United States	Joseph Hein	Matthew Emmons
2011 ISSF World Cup # 2	Slovakia	Jozef Gönci	Jozef Gönci
2011 ISSF World Cup # 2	Austria	Thomas Farnik	Thomas Farnik
2011 ISSF World Cup # 3	India	Sanjeev Rajput	Sanjeev Rajput
2011 ISSF World Cup # 3	Norway	Ole-Kristian Bryhn	Ole-Kristian Bryhn
2011 ISSF World Cup # 5	Switzerland	Simon Beyeler	Simon Beyeler
2011 ISSF World Cup # 5	Russia	Alexei Kamenski	Artem Khadjibekov
2011 ISSF World Cup # 6	China	Lan Xing	Lan Xing
2011 ISSF World Cup # 6	Norway	Ole Magnus Bakken	Are Hansen
2011 European Championships	Belarus	Yury Shcherbatsevich	Yury Shcherbatsevich
2011 European Championships	Croatia	Bojan Đurković	Bojan Đurković
2011 European Championships	Belarus	Vitali Bubnovich	Vitali Bubnovich
2011 European Championships	Germany	Daniel Brodmeier	Daniel Brodmeier
2011 Pan American Games	United States	Jason Parker	Jason Parker
2011 Oceania Championships	Australia	Christopher Gulvin	Dane Sampson
2012 Asian Championships	India	Imran Hasan Khan	Gagan Narang
Exchange of quota places	Ukraine		Artur Ayvazyan
Re-allocation of unused quota	Bosnia and Herzegovina		Nedžad Fazlija
Athletes qualified in other events	Netherlands		Peter Hellenbrand
Athletes qualified in other events	Mongolia		Nyantain Bayaraa
Athletes qualified in other events	Germany		Maik Eckhardt
Athletes qualified in other events	Kyrgyzstan		Ruslan Ismailov
Athletes qualified in other events	Japan		Midori Yajima
Athletes qualified in other events	Ukraine		Serhiy Kulish
Athletes qualified in other events	Bulgaria		Anton Rizov
Athletes qualified in other events	China		Zhu Qinan
Athletes qualified in other events	Czech Republic		Václav Haman
Athletes qualified in other events	Spain		Javier López
Athletes qualified in other events	France		Valérian Sauveplane
Athletes qualified in other events	Great Britain		Jonathan Hammond
Athletes qualified in other events	Hungary		Péter Sidi
Athletes qualified in other events	Italy		Niccolò Campriani
Athletes qualified in other events	Italy		Marco de Nicolo
Athletes qualified in other events	Slovenia		Rajmond Debevec
Athletes qualified in other events	Switzerland		Marcel Bürge
Total			41

== 50 m rifle prone men ==
Event	Quota places	Qualified athlete	Announced competitor
Host nation	Great Britain		Jonathan Hammond
2010 World Championships	Belarus	Sergei Martynov	Sergei Martynov
2010 World Championships	France	Valérian Sauveplane	Valérian Sauveplane
2010 World Championships	India	Hariom Singh	Joydeep Karmakar
2010 World Championships	Norway	Vebjørn Berg	Odd Arne Brekne
2010 World Championships	United States	Matthew Emmons	Michael McPhail
2010 American Continental Championships	Argentina	Juan Diego Angeloni	Juan Diego Angeloni
2011 ISSF World Cup # 2	China	Wang Weiyi	Wang Weiyi
2011 ISSF World Cup # 2	United States	Eric Uptagrafft	Eric Uptagrafft
2011 ISSF World Cup # 3	South Korea	Choi Young-jeon	Kim Hak-man
2011 ISSF World Cup # 3	Germany	Maik Eckhardt	Maik Eckhardt
2011 ISSF World Cup # 5	Germany	Henri Junghänel	Daniel Brodmeier
2011 ISSF World Cup # 5	Austria	Christian Planer	Christian Planer
2011 ISSF World Cup # 6	Denmark	Kenneth Nielsen	Torben Grimmel
2011 ISSF World Cup # 6	Switzerland	Marcel Bürge	Marcel Bürge
European Continental Championships	Slovenia	Rajmond Debevec	Rajmond Debevec
European Continental Championships	Russia	Artem Khadjibekov	Artem Khadjibekov
European Continental Championships	Spain	Javier López	Javier López
2011 Pan American Games	Argentina	Alex Suligoy	Alex Suligoy
2011 Oceania Championships	Australia	Dane Sampson	Dane Sampson
2011 Oceania Championships	Australia	Warren Potent	Warren Potent
2012 Asian Championships	Japan	Midori Yajima	Midori Yajima
2012 Asian Championships	South Korea	Lee Hyun-tae	Han Jin-seop
Exchange of quota places	New Zealand		Ryan Taylor
Re-allocation of unused quota	Belgium		Lionel Cox
Re-allocation of unused quota	Sri Lanka		Mangala Samarakoon
Athletes qualified in other events	Russia		Sergei Kovalenko
Athletes qualified in other events	Israel		Sergey Richter
Athletes qualified in other events	Croatia		Bojan Đurković
Athletes qualified in other events	Serbia		Nemanja Mirosavljev
Athletes qualified in other events	Bosnia and Herzegovina		Nedžad Fazlija
Athletes qualified in other events	Belarus		Yury Shcherbatsevich
Athletes qualified in other events	Austria		Thomas Farnik
Athletes qualified in other events	Bulgaria		Anton Rizov
Athletes qualified in other events	Canada		Cory Niefer
Athletes qualified in other events	China		Zhu Qinan
Athletes qualified in other events	Czech Republic		Václav Haman
Athletes qualified in other events	France		Cyril Graff
Athletes qualified in other events	Great Britain		James Huckle
Athletes qualified in other events	Hungary		Péter Sidi
Athletes qualified in other events	India		Gagan Narang
Athletes qualified in other events	Italy		Niccolò Campriani
Athletes qualified in other events	Italy		Marco de Nicolo
Athletes qualified in other events	Mongolia		Nyantain Bayaraa
Athletes qualified in other events	Netherlands		Peter Hellenbrand
Athletes qualified in other events	Norway		Ole Magnus Bakken
Athletes qualified in other events	Switzerland		Pascal Loretan
Athletes qualified in other events	Slovakia		Jozef Gönci
Athletes qualified in other events	Ukraine		Artur Ayvazyan
Athletes qualified in other events	Ukraine		Serhiy Kulish
Total			50

== 10 m air rifle men ==
Event	Quota places	Qualified athlete	Announced competitor
2010 World Championships	China	Zhu Qinan	Zhu Qinan
2010 World Championships	Hungary	Péter Sidi	Péter Sidi
2010 World Championships	India	Gagan Narang	Gagan Narang
2010 World Championships	Italy	Niccolò Campriani	Niccolò Campriani
2010 World Championships	Italy	Marco de Nicolo	Marco de Nicolo
2010 World Championships	Russia	Denis Sokolov	Alexandre Sokolov
2010 American Continental Championships	United States	Matthew Rawlings	Matthew Emmons
2010 American Continental Championships	Canada	Cory Niefer	Cory Niefer
2011 ISSF World Cup # 2	France	Pierre Edmond Piasecki	Pierre Edmond Piasecki
2011 ISSF World Cup # 2	Norway	Are Hansen	Are Hansen
2011 ISSF World Cup # 2	China	Wang Tao	Wang Tao
2011 ISSF World Cup # 3	Israel	Sergey Richter	Sergey Richter
2011 ISSF World Cup # 3	Ukraine	Artur Ayvazyan	Artur Ayvazyan
2011 ISSF World Cup # 3	France	Jérémy Monnier	Jérémy Monnier
2011 ISSF World Cup # 5	Netherlands	Peter Hellenbrand	Peter Hellenbrand
2011 ISSF World Cup # 5	Romania	Alin George Moldoveanu	Alin George Moldoveanu
2011 ISSF World Cup # 5	Russia	Sergey Kamenskiy	Alexei Kamenski
2011 ISSF World Cup # 6	Bulgaria	Anton Rizov	Anton Rizov
2011 ISSF World Cup # 6	India	Abhinav Bindra	Abhinav Bindra
2011 ISSF World Cup # 6	Germany	Tino Mohaupt	Tino Mohaupt
2011 Pan American Games	United States	Jonathan Hall	Jonathan Hall
2011 African Championships	Egypt	Mohamed Abdellah	Amgad Hosen
2011 Oceania Championships	Australia	William Godward	William Godward
2012 Asian Championships	Kyrgyzstan	Ruslan Ismailov	Ruslan Ismailov
2012 Asian Championships	Mongolia	Nyantain Bayaraa	Nyantain Bayaraa
2012 European Championships 10m events	Croatia	Petar Gorša	Petar Gorša
2012 European Championships 10m events	Belarus	Illia Charheika	Illia Charheika
2012 European Championships 10m events	Switzerland	Pascal Loretan	Pascal Loretan
2012 European Championships 10m events	Czech Republic	Ondřej Rozsypal	Václav Haman
Exchange of quota places	Germany		Julian Justus
Re-allocation of unused quota	Uruguay		Rudi Lausarot
Athletes qualified in other events	South Korea		Kim Jong-hyun
Athletes qualified in other events	Australia		Dane Sampson
Athletes qualified in other events	Croatia		Bojan Đurković
Athletes qualified in other events	South Korea		Han Jin-seop
Athletes qualified in other events	Serbia		Nemanja Mirosavljev
Athletes qualified in other events	Bosnia and Herzegovina		Nedžad Fazlija
Athletes qualified in other events	Japan		Midori Yajima
Athletes qualified in other events	Belarus		Vitali Bubnovich
Athletes qualified in other events	Austria		Thomas Farnik
Athletes qualified in other events	Spain		Javier López
Athletes qualified in other events	Great Britain		James Huckle
Athletes qualified in other events	Norway		Ole Magnus Bakken
Athletes qualified in other events	Sri Lanka		Mangala Samarakoon
Athletes qualified in other events	Switzerland		Simon Beyeler
Athletes qualified in other events	Slovakia		Jozef Gönci
Athletes qualified in other events	Ukraine		Serhiy Kulish
Total			47

== 50 m pistol men ==
Event	Quota places	Qualified athlete	Announced competitor
2010 World Championships	Japan	Tomoyuki Matsuda	Tomoyuki Matsuda
2010 World Championships	Kazakhstan	Vyacheslav Podlensnyy	Vyacheslav Podlensnyy
2010 World Championships	South Korea	Lee Dae-myung	Jin Jong-oh
2010 World Championships	Serbia	Andrija Zlatić	Andrija Zlatić
2010 American Continental Championships	United States	Jason Turner	Nick Mowrer
2011 ISSF World Cup # 2	Italy	Francesco Bruno	Francesco Bruno
2011 ISSF World Cup # 2	China	Pang Wei	Wang Zhiwei
2011 ISSF World Cup # 3	Russia	Leonid Ekimov	Leonid Ekimov
2011 ISSF World Cup # 3	South Korea	Kim Yeong-koo	Choi Young-rae
2011 ISSF World Cup # 5	China	Wu Xiao	Zhang Tian
2011 ISSF World Cup # 5	Slovakia	Pavol Kopp	Pavol Kopp
2011 ISSF World Cup # 6	Italy	Giuseppe Giordano	Giuseppe Giordano
2011 ISSF World Cup # 6	Belarus	Andrei Kazak	Andrei Kazak
European Continental Championships	Russia	Vladimir Isakov	Vladimir Isakov
European Continental Championships	France	Franck Dumoulin	Franck Dumoulin
2011 Pan American Games	Guatemala	Sergio Sánchez	Sergio Sánchez
2012 Asian Championships	Thailand	Jakkrit Panichpatikum	Jakkrit Panichpatikum
Tripartite Commission Invitation	Montenegro		Nikola Šaranović
Re-allocation of unused quota	Trinidad and Tobago		Roger Daniel
Re-allocation of unused quota	Iceland		Asgeir Sigurgeirsson
Athletes qualified in other events	Serbia		Damir Mikec
Athletes qualified in other events	Australia		Daniel Repacholi
Athletes qualified in other events	Germany		Florian Schmidt
Athletes qualified in other events	Iran		Ebrahim Barkhordari
Athletes qualified in other events	Portugal		João Costa
Athletes qualified in other events	Albania		Arben Kucana
Athletes qualified in other events	Vietnam		Hoàng Xuân Vinh
Athletes qualified in other events	Belarus		Kanstantsin Lukashyk
Athletes qualified in other events	Ukraine		Oleh Omelchuk
Athletes qualified in other events	Armenia		Norayr Bakhtamyan
Athletes qualified in other events	Spain		Pablo Carrera
Athletes qualified in other events	Finland		Kai Jahnsson
Athletes qualified in other events	France		Walter Lapeyre
Athletes qualified in other events	Germany		Christian Reitz
Athletes qualified in other events	Slovakia		Juraj Tužinský
Athletes qualified in other events	Turkey		Yusuf Dikeç
Athletes qualified in other events	Turkey		İsmail Keleş
Athletes qualified in other events	United States		Daryl Szarenski
Total			38

== 25 m rapid fire pistol men ==
Event	Quota places	Qualified athlete	Announced competitor
2010 World Championships	Russia	Alexei Klimov	Alexei Klimov
2010 World Championships	China	Zhang Jian	Zhang Jian
American Continental Championships	Cuba	Leuris Pupo	Leuris Pupo
2011 ISSF World Cup # 2	Czech Republic	Martin Podhráský	Martin Podhráský
2011 ISSF World Cup # 2	Russia	Viatcheslav Kalioujnyi	Leonid Ekimov
2011 ISSF World Cup # 3	United States	Keith Sanderson	Keith Sanderson
2011 ISSF World Cup # 3	Spain	Jorge Llames	Jorge Llames
2011 ISSF World Cup # 5	Germany	Christian Reitz	Christian Reitz
2011 ISSF World Cup # 5	India	Vijay Kumar	Vijay Kumar
2011 ISSF World Cup # 6	Germany	Ralf Schumann	Ralf Schumann
2011 ISSF World Cup # 6	United States	Emil Milev	Emil Milev
2011 European Championship	Ukraine	Roman Bondaruk	Roman Bondaruk
2011 European Championship	Czech Republic	Martin Strnad	Martin Strnad
2011 Oceania Championships	Australia	Bruce Quick	David Chapman
2012 Asian Championships	China	Li Yuehong	Ding Feng
2012 Asian Championships	South Korea	Jang Dang-kyu	Kim Dae-yoong
Re-allocation of unused quota	Latvia		Afanasijs Kuzmins
Athletes qualified in other events	Thailand		Jakkrit Panichpatikum
Total			18

== 10 m air pistol men ==
Event	Quota places	Qualified athlete	Announced competitor
2010 World Championships	South Korea	Jin Jong-oh	Jin Jong-oh
2010 World Championships	Portugal	João Costa	João Costa
2010 World Championships	Russia	Sergey Chervyakovskiy	Leonid Ekimov
2010 World Championships	Serbia	Damir Mikec	Damir Mikec
2010 World Championships	Turkey	Yusuf Dikeç	Yusuf Dikeç
American Continental Championships	United States	Brian Beaman	Jason Turner
2011 ISSF World Cup # 2	Ukraine	Oleh Omelchuk	Oleh Omelchuk
2011 ISSF World Cup # 2	China	Zhang Tian	Pang Wei
2011 ISSF World Cup # 2	Slovakia	Juraj Tužinský	Juraj Tužinský
2011 ISSF World Cup # 3	France	Walter Lapeyre	Walter Lapeyre
2011 ISSF World Cup # 3	Serbia	Dimitrije Grgić	Andrija Zlatić
2011 ISSF World Cup # 3	Belarus	Kanstantsin Lukashyk	Kanstantsin Lukashyk
2011 ISSF World Cup # 5	Finland	Kai Jahnsson	Kai Jahnsson
2011 ISSF World Cup # 5	Germany	Florian Schmidt	Florian Schmidt
2011 ISSF World Cup # 5	Spain	Pablo Carrera	Pablo Carrera
2011 ISSF World Cup # 6	Russia	Denis Kulakov	Denis Kulakov
2011 ISSF World Cup # 6	Armenia	Norayr Bakhtamyan	Norayr Bakhtamyan
2011 ISSF World Cup # 6	Iran	Ebrahim Barkhordari	Ebrahim Barkhordari
2011 Pan American Games	United States	Daryl Szarenski	Daryl Szarenski
2011 African Championship	Egypt	Karim Wagih	Karim Wagih
2011 Oceania Continental Championships	Australia	Daniel Repacholi	Daniel Repacholi
2012 Asian Championships	China	Wang Zhiwei	Tan Zongliang
2012 Asian Championships	Vietnam	Hoàng Xuân Vinh	Hoàng Xuân Vinh
2012 European Championships 10m events	Belarus	Vladislav Kocarenko	Yury Dauhapolau
2012 European Championships 10m events	Italy	Luca Tesconi	Luca Tesconi
2012 European Championships 10m events	Switzerland	Patrick Scheuber	Patrick Scheuber
2012 European Championships 10m events	Turkey	İsmail Keleş	İsmail Keleş
Exchange of quota places	Ukraine		Denys Kushnirov
Tripartite Commission Invitation	Myanmar		Maung Kyu
Re-allocation of unused quota	Albania		Arben Kucana
Re-allocation of unused quota	Algeria		Fateh Ziadi
Re-allocation of unused quota	Tajikistan		Sergey Babikov
Athletes qualified in other events	South Korea		Choi Young-rae
Athletes qualified in other events	Guatemala		Sergio Sánchez
Athletes qualified in other events	Iceland		Asgeir Sigurgeirsson
Athletes qualified in other events	France		Franck Dumoulin
Athletes qualified in other events	India		Vijay Kumar
Athletes qualified in other events	Italy		Francesco Bruno
Athletes qualified in other events	Japan		Tomoyuki Matsuda
Athletes qualified in other events	Kazakhstan		Vyacheslav Podlesnyy
Athletes qualified in other events	Montenegro		Nikola Šaranović
Athletes qualified in other events	Slovakia		Pavol Kopp
Athletes qualified in other events	Thailand		Jakkrit Panichpatikum
Athletes qualified in other events	Trinidad and Tobago		Roger Daniel
Total			44

== Trap men ==
Event	Quota places	Qualified athlete	Announced competitor
Host nation	Great Britain		Edward Ling
2010 World Championships	China	Li Yajun	Du Yu
2010 World Championships	Czech Republic	Jiří Lipták	Jiří Lipták
2010 World Championships	Italy	Giovanni Pellielo	Giovanni Pellielo
2010 World Championships	Russia	Alexey Alipov	Alexey Alipov
2010 World Championships	Spain	Alberto Fernández	Alberto Fernández
2010 American Continental Championships	Dominican Republic	Sergio Piñero	Sergio Piñero
2010 American Continental Championships	Guatemala	Jean Pierre Brol	Jean Pierre Brol
2011 ISSF World Cup # 1	Turkey	Oğuzhan Tüzün	Oğuzhan Tüzün
2011 ISSF World Cup # 1	Russia	Pavel Gurkin	Maxim Kosarev
2011 ISSF World Cup # 2	Italy	Rodolfo Viganò	Massimo Fabbrizi
2011 ISSF World Cup # 2	Germany	Stefan Rüttgeroth	Karsten Bindrich
2011 ISSF World Cup # 4	Croatia	Giovanni Cernogoraz	Giovanni Cernogoraz
2011 ISSF World Cup # 4	Czech Republic	Jiří Gach	David Kostelecký
2010 African Championships	Egypt	Ahmed Zaher	Ahmed Zaher
2011 ISSF World Cup # 7	Spain	Jesús Serrano	Jesús Serrano
2011 ISSF World Cup # 7	Australia	Michael Diamond	Michael Diamond
2011 European Championships	Slovakia	Erik Varga	Erik Varga
2011 European Championships	Slovenia	Boštjan Maček	Boštjan Maček
2011 European Championships	Croatia	Anton Glasnović	Anton Glasnović
2011 European Championships	Austria	Andreas Scherhaufer	Andreas Scherhaufer
2011 European Championships	Belarus	Andrei Kavalenka	Andrei Kavalenka
2011 World Shotgun Championships	France	Stéphane Clamens	Stéphane Clamens
2011 Pan American Games	Colombia	Danilo Caro	Danilo Caro
2011 Oceania Championships	Fiji	Glenn Kable	Glenn Kable
2011 Oceania Championships	Australia	Matthew Stokes	Adam Vella
2012 Asian Championships	India	Manavjit Singh Sandhu	Manavjit Singh Sandhu
2012 Asian Championships	Kuwait	Talal Al-Rashidi	Talal Al-Rashidi
2012 Asian Championships	Qatar	Rashid Hamad Al-Athba	Rashid Hamad Al-Athba
2012 Asian Championships	United Arab Emirates	Dhaher Al-Aryani	Dhaher Al-Aryani
Tripartite Commission Invitation	Andorra		Joan Tomas Roca
Re-allocation of unused quota	Bolivia		Juan Carlos Pérez
Re-allocation of unused quota	Ireland		Derek Burnett
Athletes qualified in other events	Kuwait		Fehaid Al-Deehani
Total			34

== Double trap men ==
Event	Quota places	Qualified athlete	Announced competitor
2010 World Championships	China	Hu Binyuan	Hu Binyuan
2010 World Championships	Russia	Vasily Mosin	Vasily Mosin
2010 World Championships	United States	Joshua Richmond	Joshua Richmond
2010 American Continental Championships	Brazil	Filipe Fuzaro	Filipe Fuzaro
2011 ISSF World Cup # 1	Russia	Vitaly Fokeev	Vitaly Fokeev
2011 ISSF World Cup # 1	Great Britain	Peter Wilson	Peter Wilson
2011 ISSF World Cup # 2	Great Britain	Richard Faulds	Richard Faulds
2011 ISSF World Cup # 2	Italy	Francesco d'Aniello	Francesco d'Aniello
2011 ISSF World Cup # 4	Malta	William Chetcuti	William Chetcuti
2011 ISSF World Cup # 4	India	Ronjan Sodhi	Ronjan Sodhi
2010 African Championships	South Africa	Alistair Davis	Alistair Davis
2011 ISSF World Cup # 7	Hungary	Richárd Bognár	Richárd Bognár
2011 ISSF World Cup # 7	Italy	Daniele di Spigno	Daniele di Spigno
2011 European Championships	Sweden	Håkan Dahlby	Håkan Dahlby
2011 World Shotgun Championships	China	Li Jun	Li Jun
2011 Oceania Championships	Australia	Russel Mark	Russel Mark
2012 Asian Championships	United Arab Emirates	Juma Al-Maktoum	Juma Al-Maktoum
2012 Asian Championships	Kuwait	Fehaid Al-Deehani	Fehaid Al-Deehani
Exchange of quota places	United States		Walton Eller
Tripartite Commission Invitation	Oman		Ahmed Al-Hatmi
Re-allocation of unused quota	Puerto Rico		José Torres Laboy
Athletes qualified in other events	Croatia		Anton Glasnović
Athletes qualified in other events	Dominican Republic		Sergio Piñero
Athletes qualified in other events	Qatar		Rashid Hamad Al-Athba
Total			24

== Skeet men ==
Event	Quota places	Qualified athlete	Announced competitor
Host nation	Great Britain		Rory Warlow
2010 World Championships	Cyprus	Georgios Achilleos	Georgios Achilleos
2010 World Championships	Russia	Valeriy Shomin	Valeriy Shomin
2010 World Championships	Italy	Ennio Falco	Ennio Falco
2010 World Championships	Cyprus	Antonakis Andreou	Antonakis Andreou
2010 World Championships	United States	Vincent Hancock	Vincent Hancock
2010 American Continental Championships	United States	Frank Thompson	Frank Thompson
2010 American Continental Championships	Mexico	Javier Rodríguez	Javier Rodríguez
2011 ISSF World Cup # 1	Czech Republic	Jan Sychra	Jan Sychra
2011 ISSF World Cup # 1	Norway	Tore Brovold	Tore Brovold
2011 ISSF World Cup # 2	Italy	Luigi Lodde	Luigi Lodde
2011 ISSF World Cup # 2	Great Britain	Richard Brickell	Richard Brickell
2011 ISSF World Cup # 4	Greece	Nikolas Mavrommatis	Nikolas Mavrommatis
2011 ISSF World Cup # 4	Denmark	Jesper Hansen	Jesper Hansen
2010 African Championships	Egypt	Azmy Mehelba	Azmy Mehelba
2011 ISSF World Cup # 7	Denmark	Anders Golding	Anders Golding
2011 ISSF World Cup # 7	Greece	Efthimios Mitas	Efthimios Mitas
2011 European Championships	France	Éric Delaunay	Anthony Terras
2011 European Championships	Germany	Tino Wenzel	Ralf Buchheim
2011 European Championships	Czech Republic	Jakub Tomeček	Jakub Tomeček
2011 European Championships	Sweden	Marcus Svensson	Marcus Svensson
2011 European Championships	Sweden	Stefan Nilsson	Stefan Nilsson
2011 World Shotgun Championships	Spain	Juan José Aramburu	Juan José Aramburu
2011 Pan American Games	Cuba	Guillermo Torres	Guillermo Torres
2011 Oceania Championships	Australia	Paul Adams	Keith Ferguson
2011 Oceania Championships	Australia	Clive Barton	Clive Barton
2012 Asian Championships	United Arab Emirates	Saeed Almaktoum	Saeed Almaktoum
2012 Asian Championships	Kuwait	Abdullah Al-Rashidi	Abdullah Al-Rashidi
2012 Asian Championships	Qatar	Nasser Al-Attiyah	Nasser Al-Attiyah
2012 Asian Championships	South Korea	Kwang Soo-cho	Cho Yong-seong
Exchange of quota places	Egypt		Mostafa Hamdy
Exchange of quota places	Switzerland		Fabio Ramella
Re-allocation of unused quota	Saudi Arabia		Majed Al-Tamimi
Re-allocation of unused quota	Pakistan		Khurrum Inam
Re-allocation of unused quota	Peru		Nicolás Pacheco
Re-allocation of unused quota	Philippines		Brian Rosario
Total			36

== 50 m rifle 3 positions women ==
Event	Quota places	Qualified athlete	Announced competitor
2010 World Championships	Ukraine	Natallia Kalnysh	Dariya Sharipova
2010 World Championships	United States	Jamie Lynn Gray	Jamie Lynn Gray
2010 World Championships	Switzerland	Annik Marguet	Annik Marguet
2010 World Championships	Germany	Barbara Engleder	Barbara Engleder
2010 World Championships	Germany	Sonja Pfeilschifter	Sonja Pfeilschifter
2010 American Continental Championships	United States	Sandra Fong	Amanda Furrer
2010 American Continental Championships	Mexico	Alexis Gabriela Martínez	Alexis Gabriela Martínez
2011 ISSF World Cup # 2	Poland	Sylwia Bogacka	Sylwia Bogacka
2011 ISSF World Cup # 2	France	Laurence Brize	Laurence Brize
2011 ISSF World Cup # 3	China	Li Peijing	Li Peijing
2011 ISSF World Cup # 3	France	Émilie Évesque	Émilie Évesque
2011 ISSF World Cup # 5	Serbia	Andrea Arsović	Andrea Arsović
2011 ISSF World Cup # 6	China	Wan Xiangyan	Du Li
2011 ISSF World Cup # 6	Slovakia	Daniela Pešková	Daniela Pešková
2011 European Championships	Russia	Liubov Galkina	Liubov Galkina
2011 European Championships	Estonia	Anžela Voronova	Anžela Voronova
2011 European Championships	Russia	Tatyana Yushkova	Daria Vdovina
2011 European Championships	Finland	Marjo Yli-Kiikka	Marjo Yli-Kiikka
2011 Pan American Games	Cuba	Dianelys Pérez	Dianelys Pérez
2011 Oceania Championships	Australia	Robyn van Nus	Robyn van Nus
2012 Asian Championships	Kazakhstan	Olga Dovgun	Olga Dovgun
2012 Asian Championships	South Korea	Jeong Gyung-suk	Na Yoon-kyung
2012 Asian Championships	South Korea	Jeong Mi-ra	Jeong Mi-ra
Exchange of quota places	Qatar		Bahya Mansour Al-Hamad
Exchange of quota places	Poland		Agnieszka Nagay
Re-allocation of unused quota	Bahrain		Azza Al-Qasmi
Athletes qualified in other events	Australia		Alethea Sedgman
Athletes qualified in other events	Croatia		Snježana Pejčić
Athletes qualified in other events	Iran		Elaheh Ahmadi
Athletes qualified in other events	Iran		Mahlagha Jambozorg
Athletes qualified in other events	Serbia		Ivana Maksimović
Athletes qualified in other events	Austria		Stephanie Obermoser
Athletes qualified in other events	Bulgaria		Petya Lukanova
Athletes qualified in other events	Cuba		Eglis Yaima Cruz
Athletes qualified in other events	Czech Republic		Kateřina Emmons
Athletes qualified in other events	Czech Republic		Adéla Sýkorová
Athletes qualified in other events	Denmark		Stine Nielsen
Athletes qualified in other events	El Salvador		Melissa Mikec
Athletes qualified in other events	Great Britain		Jennifer McIntosh
Athletes qualified in other events	Italy		Elania Nardelli
Athletes qualified in other events	Italy		Petra Zublasing
Athletes qualified in other events	Kuwait		Maryam Arzouqi
Athletes qualified in other events	Norway		Malin Westerheim
Athletes qualified in other events	Singapore		Jasmine Ser Xiang Wei
Athletes qualified in other events	Slovenia		Živa Dvoršak
Athletes qualified in other events	Ukraine		Daria Tykhova
Athletes qualified in other events	Uzbekistan		Sakina Mamedova
Total			47

== 10 m air rifle women ==
Event	Quota places	Qualified athlete	Announced competitor
Host nation	Great Britain		Jennifer McIntosh
2010 World Championships	China	Yi Siling	Yi Siling
2010 World Championships	China	Wu Liuxi	Yu Dan
2010 World Championships	Italy	Elania Nardelli	Elania Nardelli
2010 World Championships	Iran	Mahlagha Jambozorg	Mahlagha Jambozorg
2010 World Championships	Germany	Beate Gauss	Beate Gauss
2010 World Championships	Germany	Jessica Mager	Jessica Mager
2010 American Continental Championships	Cuba	Eglis Yaima Cruz	Eglis Yaima Cruz
2010 American Continental Championships	Mexico	Rosa Peña Rocamontes	Rosa Peña Rocamontes
2011 ISSF World Cup # 2	Croatia	Snjezana Pejcic	Snjezana Pejcic
2011 ISSF World Cup # 2	Iran	Elaheh Ahmadi	Elaheh Ahmadi
2011 ISSF World Cup # 2	Ukraine	Daria Tykhova	Daria Tykhova
2011 ISSF World Cup # 3	United States	Sarah Scherer	Sarah Scherer
2011 ISSF World Cup # 3	Poland	Agnieszka Nagay	Sylwia Bogacka
2011 ISSF World Cup # 3	Serbia	Ivana Maksimović	Ivana Maksimović
2011 ISSF World Cup # 5	Italy	Petra Zublasing	Petra Zublasing
2011 ISSF World Cup # 5	Denmark	Stine Nielsen	Stine Nielsen
2011 ISSF World Cup # 5	Austria	Stephanie Obermoser	Stephanie Obermoser
2011 ISSF World Cup # 6	Czech Republic	Kateřina Emmons	Kateřina Emmons
2011 ISSF World Cup # 6	Czech Republic	Adéla Sýkorová	Adéla Sýkorová
2011 ISSF World Cup # 6	Denmark	Anette Jensen	Stine Anderson
2011 Pan American Games	United States	Emily Caruso	Jamie Lynn Gray
2011 African Championships	Egypt	Nourhan Amer	Nourhan Amer
2012 Asian Championships	Kuwait	Maryam Arzouqi	Maryam Arzouqi
2012 Asian Championships	Malaysia	Nur Suryani Mohd Taibi	Nur Suryani Mohd Taibi
2012 European Championships 10m events	Slovenia	Živa Dvoršak	Živa Dvoršak
2012 European Championships 10m events	Norway	Marte Torvik	Malin Westerheim
2012 European Championships 10m events	Poland	Paula Wrońska	Paula Wrońska
2012 European Championships 10m events	Bulgaria	Petya Lukanova	Petya Lukanova
Exchange of quota places	Australia		Alethea Sedgman
Exchange of quota places	Russia		Daria Vdovina
Tripartite Commission Invitation	Bangladesh		Sharmin Ratna
Tripartite Commission Invitation	Bhutan		Kunzang Choden
Re-allocation of unused quota	Ecuador		Sofia Padilla
Re-allocation of unused quota	El Salvador		Melissa Mikec
Re-allocation of unused quota	Indonesia		Diaz Kusumawardani
Re-allocation of unused quota	Luxembourg		Carole Calmes
Re-allocation of unused quota	Nepal		Sneh Rana
Re-allocation of unused quota	Singapore		Jasmine Ser Xiang Wei
Re-allocation of unused quota	Syria		Raya Zin Aldden
Re-allocation of unused quota	Uzbekistan		Sakina Mamedova
Athletes qualified in other events	Australia		Robyn van Nus
Athletes qualified in other events	South Korea		Jeong Mi-ra
Athletes qualified in other events	South Korea		Na Yoon-kyung
Athletes qualified in other events	Russia		Lioubov Galkina
Athletes qualified in other events	Serbia		Andrea Arsović
Athletes qualified in other events	Cuba		Dianelys Pérez
Athletes qualified in other events	Estonia		Anžela Voronova
Athletes qualified in other events	Finland		Marjo Yli-Kiikka
Athletes qualified in other events	France		Laurence Brize
Athletes qualified in other events	France		Émilie Évesque
Athletes qualified in other events	Kazakhstan		Olga Dovgun
Athletes qualified in other events	Qatar		Bahya Mansour Al-Hamad
Athletes qualified in other events	Switzerland		Annik Marguet
Athletes qualified in other events	Slovakia		Daniela Pešková
Athletes qualified in other events	Ukraine		Dariya Sharipova
Total			56

== 25 m pistol women ==
Event	Quota places	Qualified athlete	Announced competitor
2010 World Championships	Russia	Yuliya Alipava	Anna Mastyanina
2010 World Championships	Russia	Kira Mozgalova	Kira Mozgalova
2010 World Championships	Spain	Sonia Franquet	Sonia Franquet
2010 World Championships	Japan	Yukari Konishi	Yukari Konishi
2010 World Championships	North Korea	Jo Yong-suk	Jo Yong-suk
2010 American Continental Championships	Brazil	Ana Luiza Mello	Ana Luiza Mello
2011 ISSF World Cup # 2	China	Yuan Jing	Yuan Jing
2011 ISSF World Cup # 2	Bulgaria	Antoaneta Boneva	Antoaneta Boneva
2011 ISSF World Cup # 3	China	Chen Ying	Chen Ying
2011 ISSF World Cup # 3	Germany	Munkhbayar Dorjsuren	Munkhbayar Dorjsuren
2011 ISSF World Cup # 5	Mongolia	Otryadyn Gündegmaa	Otryadyn Gündegmaa
2011 ISSF World Cup # 5	India	Rahi Sarnobat	Rahi Sarnobat
2011 ISSF World Cup # 6	Bulgaria	Mariya Grozdeva	Mariya Grozdeva
2011 ISSF World Cup # 6	Hungary	Zsófia Csonka	Zsófia Csonka
2011 European Championships	Switzerland	Heidi Diethelm	Heidi Diethelm
2011 European Championships	Great Britain	Georgina Geikie	Georgina Geikie
2011 European Championships	Azerbaijan	Irada Ashumova	Irada Ashumova
2011 Pan American Games	United States	Sandra Uptagrafft	Sandra Uptagrafft
2011 Oceania Continental Championship	Australia	Chloe Esposito	Hayley Chapman
2012 Asian Championships	Thailand	Naphaswan Yangpaiboon	Naphaswan Yangpaiboon
2012 Asian Championships	Vietnam	Lê Thị Hoàng Ngọc	Lê Thị Hoàng Ngọc
2012 Asian Championships	Thailand	Tanyaporn Prucksakorn	Tanyaporn Prucksakorn
Exchange of quota places	India		Heena Sidhu
Exchange of quota places	South Korea		Kim Kyeong-ae
Exchange of quota places	Serbia		Zorana Arunović
Athletes qualified in other events	Germany		Claudia Verdicchio-Krause
Athletes qualified in other events	Australia		Lalita Yauhleuskaya
Athletes qualified in other events	South Korea		Kim Jang-mi
Athletes qualified in other events	Poland		Beata Bartków-Kwiatkowska
Athletes qualified in other events	Portugal		Joana Castelão
Athletes qualified in other events	Serbia		Jasna Šekarić
Athletes qualified in other events	Chinese Taipei		Tien Chia-chen
Athletes qualified in other events	Belarus		Viktoria Chaika
Athletes qualified in other events	Czech Republic		Lenka Marušková
Athletes qualified in other events	France		Céline Goberville
Athletes qualified in other events	France		Stéphanie Tirode
Athletes qualified in other events	Georgia		Nino Salukvadze
Athletes qualified in other events	Ukraine		Olena Kostevych
Athletes qualified in other events	Venezuela		Maribel Pineda
Total			39

== 10 m air pistol women ==
Event	Quota places	Qualified athlete	Announced competitor
2010 World Championships	Australia	Lalita Yauhleuskaya	Lalita Yauhleuskaya
2010 World Championships	Belarus	Viktoria Chaika	Viktoria Chaika
2010 World Championships	China	Su Yuling	Su Yuling
2010 World Championships	Czech Republic	Lenka Marušková	Lenka Marušková
2010 World Championships	Finland	Mira Suhonen	Mira Suhonen
2010 World Championships	Serbia	Zorana Arunović	Zorana Arunović
2010 American Continental Championships	Mexico	Alejandra Zavala	Alejandra Zavala
2011 ISSF World Cup # 2	Georgia	Nino Salukvadze	Nino Salukvadze
2011 ISSF World Cup # 2	Ukraine	Olena Kostevych	Olena Kostevych
2011 ISSF World Cup # 2	Chinese Taipei	Tien Chia-chen	Tien Chia-chen
2011 ISSF World Cup # 3	China	Sun Qi	Guo Wenjun
2011 ISSF World Cup # 3	South Korea	Park Min-jin	Kim Byung-hee
2011 ISSF World Cup # 3	Australia	Dina Aspandiyarova	Dina Aspandiyarova
2011 ISSF World Cup # 5	India	Annu Raj Singh	Annu Raj Singh
2011 ISSF World Cup # 5	France	Céline Goberville	Céline Goberville
2011 ISSF World Cup # 5	Greece	Athina Douka	Athina Douka
2011 ISSF World Cup # 6	France	Stéphanie Tirode	Stéphanie Tirode
2011 ISSF World Cup # 6	Russia	Liubov Yaskevich	Liubov Yaskevich
2011 ISSF World Cup # 6	Poland	Beata Bartków-Kwiatkowska	Beata Bartków-Kwiatkowska
2011 Pan American Games	Canada	Dorothy Ludwig	Dorothy Ludwig
2011 African Championship	Tunisia	Olfa Charni	Noura Nasri
2012 Asian Shooting Championships	South Korea	Kim Jang-mi	Kim Jang-mi
2012 European Championships 10m events	Serbia	Bobana Veličković	Bobana Veličković
2012 European Championships 10m events	Germany	Claudia Verdicchio-Krause	Claudia Verdicchio-Krause
2012 European Championships 10m events	Russia	Galina Orlovskaya	Natalia Paderina
2012 European Championships 10m events	Portugal	Joana Castelão	Joana Castelão
Exchange of quota places	Chinese Taipei		Yu Ai-wen
Tripartite Commission Invitation	Honduras		Claudia Carolina Fajardo Rodriguez
Tripartite Commission Invitation	Iraq		Noor Amer
Re-allocation of unused quota	Hong Kong		Ip Pui Yi
Re-allocation of unused quota	Moldova		Marina Zgurscaia
Re-allocation of unused quota	Venezuela		Maribel Pineda
Athletes qualified in other events	Germany		Munkhbayar Dorjsuren
Athletes qualified in other events	Vietnam		Lê Thị Hoàng Ngọc
Athletes qualified in other events	North Korea		Jo Yong-suk
Athletes qualified in other events	Japan		Yukari Konishi
Athletes qualified in other events	Azerbaijan		Irada Ashumova
Athletes qualified in other events	Brazil		Ana Luiza Mello
Athletes qualified in other events	Bulgaria		Antoaneta Boneva
Athletes qualified in other events	Bulgaria		Maria Grozdeva
Athletes qualified in other events	Spain		Sonia Franquet
Athletes qualified in other events	Great Britain		Georgina Geikie
Athletes qualified in other events	Hungary		Zsófia Csonka
Athletes qualified in other events	India		Heena Sidhu
Athletes qualified in other events	Mongolia		Otryadyn Gündegmaa
Athletes qualified in other events	Switzerland		Heidi Diethelm
Athletes qualified in other events	Thailand		Tanyaporn Prucksakorn
Athletes qualified in other events	Thailand		Naphaswan Yangpaiboon
Athletes qualified in other events	United States		Sandra Uptagrafft
Total			49

== Trap women ==
Event	Quota places	Qualified athlete	Announced competitor
Host nation	Great Britain		Charlotte Kerwood
2010 World Championships	Slovakia	Zuzana Štefečeková	Zuzana Štefečeková
2010 World Championships	Italy	Jessica Rossi	Jessica Rossi
2010 World Championships	China	Liu Yingzi	Liu Yingzi
2010 American Continental Championships	United States	Corey Cogdell	Corey Cogdell
2011 ISSF World Cup # 1	San Marino	Alessandra Perilli	Alessandra Perilli
2011 ISSF World Cup # 1	Spain	Fátima Gálvez	Fátima Gálvez
2011 ISSF World Cup # 2	South Korea	Eom So-yeon	Kang Gee-eun
2011 ISSF World Cup # 2	Turkey	Nihan Kantarcı	Nihan Kantarcı
2011 ISSF World Cup # 4	Chinese Taipei	Lin Yi-chun	Lin Yi-chun
2011 ISSF World Cup # 4	Finland	Satu Mäkelä-Nummela	Satu Mäkelä-Nummela
2011 African Championships	Namibia	Gaby Ahrens	Gaby Ahrens
2011 ISSF World Cup # 7	France	Delphine Racinet	Delphine Racinet
2011 ISSF World Cup # 7	Germany	Katrin Quooß	Sonja Scheibl
2011 European Championships	Russia	Elena Tkach	Elena Tkach
2011 World Shotgun Championships	India	Shagun Chowdhary	Shagun Chowdhary
2011 Oceania Championships	Australia	Laetisha Scanlan	Suzanne Balogh
2012 Asian Championships	Japan	Yukie Nakayama	Yukie Nakayama
Tripartite Commission Invitation	Lebanon		Ray Bassil
Re-allocation of unused quota	Lithuania		Daina Gudzinevičiūtė
Re-allocation of unused quota	Morocco		Yasmina Mesfioui
Athletes qualified in other events	United States		Kimberly Rhode
Total			22

== Skeet women ==
Event	Quota places	Qualified athlete	Announced competitor
Host nation	Great Britain		Elena Allen
2010 World Championships	Slovakia	Danka Barteková	Danka Barteková
2010 World Championships	China	Wei Ning	Wei Ning
2010 World Championships	United States	Kimberly Rhode	Kimberly Rhode
2010 American Continental Championships	Chile	Francisca Crovetto Chadid	Francisca Crovetto Chadid
2011 ISSF World Cup # 1	Italy	Chiara Cainero	Chiara Cainero
2011 ISSF World Cup # 1	Russia	Marina Ezhova	Marina Belikova
2011 ISSF World Cup # 2	Sweden	Therese Lundqvist	Therese Lundqvist
2011 ISSF World Cup # 2	Australia	Lauryn Mark	Lauryn Mark
2011 ISSF World Cup # 4	Germany	Christina Wenzel	Christina Wenzel
2011 ISSF World Cup # 4	Thailand	Sutiya Jiewchaloemmit	Sutiya Jiewchaloemmit
2011 African Championship	Egypt	Mona El-Hawary	Mona El-Hawary
2011 ISSF World Cup # 7	Cyprus	Panayiota Andreou	Panayiota Andreou
2011 ISSF World Cup # 7	France	Véronique Girardet	Véronique Girardet
2011 European Championship	Turkey	Çiğdem Özyaman	Çiğdem Özyaman
2011 World Shotgun Championship	Romania	Lucia Mihalache	Lucia Mihalache
2012 Asian Championships	Kazakhstan	Angelina Michshuk	Angelina Michshuk
Total			17
