= Shooting at the 2015 European Games – Men's 10 metre air rifle =

Men's 10 m air rifle at the 2015 European Games
- Venue: Baku Shooting Centre
- Date: 16 June
- Competitors: 35 from 23 nations

Medalists
gold medal	Vitali Bubnovich	Belarus
silver medal	Niccolò Campriani	Italy
bronze medal	Sergey Richter	Israel

The men's 10 metre air rifle competition at the 2015 European Games in Baku, Azerbaijan was held on 16 June at the Baku Shooting Centre.

== Schedule ==
All times are local (UTC+5).

Date	Time	Event
Tuesday, 16 June 2015	09:00	Qualification
Tuesday, 16 June 2015	11:15	Final

== Results ==
=== Qualification ===
Rank	Athlete	Series						Total
Rank	Athlete	1	2	3	4	5	6	Total
1	Hrachik Babayan (ARM)	105.4	104.8	104.9	104.9	104.6	104.7	629.3
2	Niccolò Campriani (ITA)	103.5	104.4	104.4	106.1	105.5	105.3	629.2
3	Sergey Richter (ISR)	105.0	104.7	103.9	105.6	104.6	104.9	628.7
4	Oleh Tsarkov (UKR)	105.7	106.2	106.2	103.4	103.9	101.6	627.0
5	Vitali Bubnovich (BLR)	103.9	105.4	104.8	104.7	105.0	103.1	626.9
6	Serhiy Kulish (UKR)	104.5	104.2	104.7	105.2	105.8	102.5	626.9
7	Sergey Kruglov (RUS)	105.2	103.0	104.7	103.5	105.6	104.7	626.7
8	Michael Janker (GER)	106.0	101.9	104.9	105.1	104.8	103.2	625.9
9	Istvan Peni (HUN)	104.7	102.8	104.0	105.3	104.1	104.9	625.8
10	Julian Justus (GER)	103.0	105.0	104.7	104.8	103.8	103.7	625.0
11	Juho Kurki (FIN)	103.1	105.5	103.5	104.8	105.3	102.8	625.0
12	Illia Charheika (BLR)	103.6	103.2	104.5	103.7	105.1	104.5	624.6
13	Alexander Schmirl (AUT)	103.8	105.8	103.2	103.8	104.7	102.7	624.0
14	Anton Rizov (BUL)	103.5	103.1	104.1	104.2	105.2	103.8	623.9
15	Peter Hellenbrand (NED)	103.0	104.6	104.6	103.2	103.0	104.8	623.2
16	Ole Magnus Bakken (NOR)	104.0	104.7	102.7	104.0	103.9	103.8	623.1
17	Milutin Stefanović (SRB)	103.5	105.0	104.3	103.0	103.2	103.8	622.8
18	Are Hansen (NOR)	100.4	105.2	103.6	103.3	104.4	105.4	622.3
19	Meelis Kiisk (EST)	103.7	103.9	104.1	102.9	103.9	103.7	622.2
20	Pierre Edmond Piasecki (FRA)	103.6	104.2	103.4	102.8	103.5	104.2	621.7
21	Alexis Raynaud (FRA)	103.5	103.6	102.9	103.7	104.9	103.1	621.7
22	Alin Moldoveanu (ROU)	105.0	102.5	103.7	102.8	103.3	104.1	621.4
23	Nazar Louginets (RUS)	103.5	101.9	103.4	104.4	102.9	104.9	621.0
24	Enrico Pappalardo (ITA)	103.8	103.3	103.9	102.5	103.6	103.9	621.0
25	Jorge Diaz (ESP)	104.3	103.3	102.0	104.3	104.3	102.7	620.9
26	Péter Sidi (HUN)	102.7	102.0	104.2	104.1	102.9	104.6	620.5
27	Karolis Girulis (LTU)	104.5	102.1	102.4	103.9	103.9	102.9	619.7
28	Petar Gorsa (CRO)	103.5	104.3	104.0	103.2	101.9	102.7	619.6
29	Leor Ovadia Madlal (ISR)	102.6	103.7	101.3	103.7	104.4	103.0	618.7
30	Stevan Pletikosic (SRB)	102.7	103.2	102.6	102.2	103.8	104.0	618.5
31	Steffen Olsen (DEN)	103.6	101.4	104.3	101.5	104.2	102.7	617.7
32	Pascal Loretan (SUI)	102.9	101.1	102.9	104.4	102.9	103.4	617.6
33	Javier López (ESP)	101.7	101.7	103.0	102.6	104.1	102.5	615.6
34	Jan Lochbihler (SUI)	99.5	103.9	102.0	101.7	102.4	104.7	614.2
35	Thomas Mathis (AUT)	103.5	102.2	102.4	102.2	100.7	103.0	614.0

=== Final ===
Rank	Athlete	Series									Notes
Rank	Athlete	1	2	3	4	5	6	7	8	9	Notes
1st place, gold medalist(s)	Vitali Bubnovich (BLR)	31.3	62.6	83.1	103.6	124.7	145.5	165.3	186.3	206.6	GR
2nd place, silver medalist(s)	Niccolò Campriani (ITA)	30.4	62.2	83.1	104.4	124.3	145.4	166.8	187.2	206.4	
3rd place, bronze medalist(s)	Sergey Richter (ISR)	31.0	62.5	83.2	103.1	123.3	144.2	164.8	185.5		
4	Oleh Tsarkov (UKR)	30.5	61.3	82.1	102.7	123.7	143.4	163.4			
5	Hrachik Babayan (ARM)	31.3	62.8	83.3	103.7	123.8	143.3				
6	Sergey Kruglov (RUS)	31.2	61.8	82.5	101.6	122.6					
7	Michael Janker (GER)	30.2	61.9	81.7	101.1						
8	Serhiy Kulish (UKR)	31.0	60.6	81.5							
