= Shooting at the 2015 European Games – Men's 50 metre rifle three positions =

Men's 50 m rifle 3 positions at the 2015 European Games
- Venue: Baku Shooting Centre
- Date: 21 June
- Competitors: 33 from 20 nations

Medalists
gold medal	Valérian Sauveplane	France
silver medal	Petar Gorša	Croatia
bronze medal	Vitali Bubnovich	Belarus

The Men's 50 metre rifle three positions competition at the 2015 European Games in Baku, Azerbaijan was held on 21 June at the Baku Shooting Centre.

== Schedule ==
All times are local (UTC+5).

Date	Time	Event
Sunday, 21 June 2015	08:45	Qualification
Sunday, 21 June 2015	12:30	Final

== Results ==
=== Qualification ===
Rank	Athlete	Kneeling				Prone				Standing				Total	Xs	Notes
Rank	Athlete	1	2	3	4	1	2	3	4	1	2	3	4	Total	Xs	Notes
1	Vitali Bubnovich (BLR)	97	97	96	99	97	97	100	98	96	92	96	95	1160	43	GR
2	Petar Gorša (CRO)	96	98	98	98	98	95	98	100	92	95	95	96	1159	46	
3	Yuriy Sukhorukov (UKR)	97	96	96	96	96	98	100	99	95	98	93	93	1157	46	
4	Marco De Nicolo (ITA)	97	95	98	99	100	97	95	99	96	93	94	93	1156	43	
5	Valérian Sauveplane (FRA)	99	98	97	99	99	100	99	97	89	93	93	92	1155	52	
6	Sergey Kamenskiy (RUS)	96	97	99	96	98	98	98	96	97	96	90	93	1154	48	
7	Michael Janker (GER)	94	94	98	97	98	99	100	99	96	96	89	92	1152	55	
8	Jan Lochbihler (SUI)	96	95	99	95	98	98	99	97	90	96	97	92	1152	44	
9	Nazar Louginets (RUS)	95	95	96	95	99	96	100	96	94	94	96	96	1152	43	
10	Daniel Brodmeier (GER)	95	93	99	96	97	97	100	99	96	93	92	94	1151	52	
11	Are Hansen (NOR)	96	95	94	96	99	95	100	100	92	91	96	96	1150	48	
12	Niccolò Campriani (ITA)	97	99	95	95	94	97	97	98	96	92	97	93	1150	40	
13	Péter Sidi (HUN)	98	95	97	97	98	97	97	99	91	91	93	96	1149	48	
14	Yury Shcherbatsevich (BLR)	94	96	98	96	95	96	99	98	90	95	95	96	1148	42	
15	Steffen Olsen (DEN)	94	96	99	97	98	97	98	100	87	90	99	92	1147	47	
16	Alexander Schmirl (AUT)	97	92	96	97	98	100	99	99	89	92	97	91	1147	42	
17	Milenko Sebic (SRB)	94	97	98	95	97	98	97	97	97	92	91	93	1146	40	
18	Nemanja Mirosavljev (SRB)	97	95	97	97	99	100	97	99	93	90	92	90	1146	40	
19	Istvan Peni (HUN)	97	92	93	96	99	98	97	97	95	93	94	92	1143	37	
20	Thomas Mathis (AUT)	95	95	97	93	99	100	100	99	92	89	92	91	1142	46	
21	Simon Beyeler (SUI)	96	97	95	98	100	100	99	94	92	87	90	94	1142	44	
22	Meelis Kiisk (EST)	95	97	98	92	99	96	100	99	91	90	91	92	1140	40	
23	Serhiy Kulish (UKR)	93	95	92	95	96	98	99	97	93	93	95	94	1140	34	
24	Javier López (ESP)	94	96	95	95	97	98	99	99	88	93	92	94	1140	32	
25	Immanuel Ben Hefer (ISR)	98	95	96	96	97	98	98	97	89	95	94	85	1138	36	
26	Rajmond Debevec (SLO)	96	92	92	95	99	99	99	99	91	88	93	94	1137	38	
27	Bojan Đurković (CRO)	97	90	93	93	96	97	99	99	95	93	89	95	1136	44	
28	Juho Kurki (FIN)	96	95	92	97	97	97	95	100	93	93	85	94	1134	40	
29	Hrachik Babayan (ARM)	94	96	92	91	98	95	100	97	92	93	95	88	1131	41	
30	Cyril Graff (FRA)	96	95	96	93	98	97	97	97	87	89	91	94	1130	36	
31	Anton Rizov (BUL)	94	99	96	93	91	96	99	96	92	90	89	94	1129	35	
32	Ole Kristian Bryhn (NOR)	98	95	96	94	99	96	96	96	91	93	93	80	1127	34	
33	Leor Ovadia Madlal (ISR)	95	95	91	97	98	96	95	98	93	90	89	89	1126	38	

=== Final ===
Rank	Athlete	Knee.	Prone	Standing						Notes
Rank	Athlete	Knee.	Prone	1	2	3	4	5	6	Notes
1st place, gold medalist(s)	Valérian Sauveplane (FRA)	148.9	303.4	405.7	416.3	425.8	436.6	446.9	456.2	GR
2nd place, silver medalist(s)	Petar Gorša (CRO)	152.4	307.0	407.3	416.5	426.3	435.5	444.7	454.0	
3rd place, bronze medalist(s)	Vitali Bubnovich (BLR)	151.7	307.3	406.5	416.6	425.6	434.3	444.5		
4	Sergey Kamenskiy (RUS)	153.3	310.0	406.2	416.7	425.3	434.3			
5	Michael Janker (GER)	153.0	309.8	404.8	414.7	414.7				
6	Marco De Nicolo (ITA)	154.0	309.8	403.2	412.4					
7	Yuriy Sukhorukov (UKR)	149.6	304.5	401.5						
8	Jan Lochbihler (SUI)	149.5	303.6	397.6						
