= Bundesliga (shooting) =

German sport shooting league

- Sport: 10 m air rifle and 10 m air pistol
- Founded: 1997
- Founder: German Shooting Federation
- No. of teams: 24 in each discipline
- Country: Germany
- Most recent champions: Air rifle: SSV St. Hubertus Elsen; Air pistol: ESV Weil am Rhein
- Most titles: Air rifle:SSV ST Hubertus Elsen (5); Air pistol: SGI Waldenburg (9)
- Website: dsb.de

As in many other sports, the premier German club competition in 10 metre air rifle and 10 metre air pistol is known as the Bundesliga. The league, open to both men and women, was created in 1997 and is administered by the German Shooting Federation. In each discipline, twenty four teams of five shooters each compete during a season spanning from October to February for the German team championship. Apart from the top German shooters, the league also attracts many shooters from other European countries, as well as a few from India and the United States, and involves a number of Olympic medalists and other shooters of international success.

== League format ==
=== Match format ===
The Bundesliga matches mainly follow the International Shooting Sport Federation's rules for air rifle and air pistol, with the following important changes:

- All shooters fire only 40 competition shots.
- The sighting shots are not included in the match time. Instead there is a 15-minute sighting shot period before the match.
- The match time is lowered to 50 minutes. (Only electronic targets are allowed in the Bundesliga. When in lower leagues paper targets are used, the match time is 60 minutes.)

The shooters are paired up based on previous results so that the top shooters from both teams stand next to each other, and so on down. The shooter achieving the best 40-shot result in each pair wins a point for his or her team. Ties are resolved by firing single shots as needed. Thus, a match can be won by either 5–0, 4–1 or 3–2.

The match format of the Bundesliga has been so successful that the European Shooting Confederation mirrored it when creating the ESC Youth League for national teams of young shooters.

=== Regular season ===
Each Bundesliga consists of two divisions of twelve teams each:

- Northern division (Bundesliga Nord) covering Berlin, Brandenburg, Hamburg, Hesse, Mecklenburg-Vorpommern, Lower Saxony, North Rhine-Westphalia, Saxony, Saxony-Anhalt, Schleswig-Holstein, Thuringia and the northern part of Rhineland-Palatinate
- Southern division (Bundesliga Süd) covering Baden-Württemberg, Bavaria, Saarland and the southern part of Rhineland-Palatinate

A single round-robin of eleven match days is conducted in each division during October–December or October–January. As shooting is a sport where the club league forms only a part of the competition season, the matches are concentrated to six weekends, organized in such a way that the clubs that placed 1–10 during the previous season have two home-range matches while the remaining two teams only have one each. In the table, teams are ranked on the number of won matches; tie-breaking criteria are 1) number of individual points won, 2) results between the concerned teams, 3) number of won points on first position (etc.).

=== Finals ===
The top four teams of each division reach the finals (Bundesligafinale), held during a single weekend in February at the same location for both air rifle and air pistol. Quarterfinals and semifinals are held on Saturday, and bronze and gold medal matches on Sunday.

=== Promotion and relegation ===
Below the Bundesliga are five regional leagues: Regionalliga Nord, Regionalliga West and Regionalliga Ost below the northern division; Regionalliga Südwest and Regionalliga Süd below the southern division. The twelfth-placed team of each Bundesliga division is automatically relegated to the appropriate regional league. The eleventh-placed team competes together with the two top teams of each regional league for two spots in next year's Bundesliga.

Below the regional leagues, there are leagues managed by each Landesverband (in northern Germany, these generally follow the state borders, while the large states in the south are divided into several Landesverbände).

== Winners ==
The following clubs have become German champions since the inception of the Bundesliga.

Season	Air rifle	Air pistol
1997–1998	SV Affalterbach (1/3)	PSV Olympia Berlin (1/5)
1998–1999	SV Affalterbach (2/3)	PSV Olympia Berlin (2/5)
1999–2000	Kgl. Priv. FSG "Der Bund" München (1/3)	PSV Olympia Berlin (3/5)
2000–2001	Kgl. Priv. FSG "Der Bund" München (2/3)	PSV Olympia Berlin (4/5)
2001–2002	BSV Buer-Bülse (1/3)	VSS Haltern (1/2)
2002–2003	BSV Buer-Bülse (2/3) Jozef Gönci (Slovakia); Torsten Krebs; Alexandra Schneider; Tino Mohaupt; Nadine Masuth	PSV Olympia Berlin (5/5) Uwe Potteck; Martin Tenk (Czech Republic); Gernot Eder; Daniel Barner; Holger Buchmann
2003–2004	SV Affalterbach (3/3) Lioubov Galkina (Russia); Angela Kugele; Sandra Koch; Beate Gauss; Frank Köstel	VSS Haltern (2/2) Franck Dumoulin (France); Michael Peirick; Albert Grieskamp; Klaus Lindemann; Sven Hartmann
2004–2005	BSV Buer-Bülse (3/3) Alexandra Schneider; Dorothee Bauer; Jozef Gönci (Slovakia); Nadine Masuth; Torsten Krebs	SGI Waldenburg (1/9) Vladimir Gontcharov (Russia); Leo Braun; Patrik Lengerer; Wolfgang Renner; Franz Möndel
2005–2006	SSV St. Hubertus Elsen (1/5) Marco De Nicolo (Italy); Damian Kontny; Eva Schmitz; Dirk Leiwen; Andre Knop	SGI Waldenburg (2/9) Leo Braun; Vladimir Gontcharov (Russia); Patrik Lengerer; Wolfgang Renner; Franz Möndel
2006–2007	Post SV Plattling Barbara Lechner; Matthew Emmons (United States); Simone Legl; Franz Schreiner; Karin Steinbauer	ESV Weil am Rhein (1/2) Abdullah Ustaoglu; Swen Jülle; Markus Abt; Thomas Albiez; Christian Schebasta
2007–2008	SG Coburg (1/3) Kateřina Emmons (Czech Republic); Jürgen Wallowsky; Michaela Wagner; Claudia Huber; Sabrina Bär	SGI Waldenburg (3/9) Vladimir Gontcharov (Russia); Leo Braun; Patrick Lengerer; Wolfgang Renner; Michael Peirick
2008–2009	SG Coburg (2/3) Sabrina Bär; Michaela Wagner; Jürgen Wallowsky; Adéla Sýkorová (Czech Republic); Claudia Huber	SV Kelheim-Gmünd (1/5) Roberto Di Donna (Italy); Munkhbayar Dorjsuren; Sebastian Rosner; Thomas Karsch; Christoph Schultheiß
2009–2010	HSG München (1/3)	SGI Waldenburg (4/9)
2010–2011	Kgl. Priv. FSG "Der Bund" München (3/3)	SGI Waldenburg (5/9)
2011–2012	SSV St. Hubertus Elsen (2/5)	SGI Waldenburg (6/9)
2012–2013	HSG München (1/2)	SV Kriftel (1/2)
2013–2014	HSG München (2/2)	SGI Waldenburg (7/9)
2014–2015	SG Coburg (3/3)	SV Kelheim-Gmünd (2/5)
2015–2016	SSV St. Hubertus Elsen (3/5)	SV Waldkirch
2016–2017	SSV St. Hubertus Elsen (4/5)	SV Kelheim-Gmünd (3/5)
2017–2018	SB Freiheit	SV Kriftel (2/2)
2018–2019	SSG Kevelaer (1/4)	SGI Waldenburg (8/9)
2019–2020	SSG Kevelaer (2/4)	Braunschweiger SG 1545
2021–2022	SSG Kevelaer (3/4)	SGI Waldenburg (9/9)
2022–2023	SSG Kevelaer (4/4)	SV Kelheim-Gmünd (4/5)
2023–2024	SV Wieckenberg	SV Kelheim-Gmünd (5/5)
2024–2025	SSV ST Hubertus Elsen (5/5)	ESV Weil am Rhein (2/2)

== Current clubs ==
The following clubs are qualified for the 2018–2019 season. Ranks from the previous season are in parentheses, the defending champions in bold and promoted teams in italics.

=== Air rifle ===

Northern division	Southern division
Braunschweiger SG 1545	Eichenlaub Saltendorf
BSV Buer-Bülse	FSG Kempten
**SB Freiheit**	Kgl. Priv. FSG "Der Bund" München
SG 1920 Mengshausen	Kgl. Priv. FSG Titting
SSG Kevelaer	KKS Königsbach
SSV St. Hubertus Elsen	SG Coburg
SV Gölzau	SV Buch
SV Olympia 72 Börm/Dörpstedt	SV Germania Prittlbach
SV Kamen	SV Niederlauterbach
SV Wieckenberg	SV Petersaurach
TuS Hilgert	SV Pfeil Vöhringen
Wissener SV	SSG Dynamit Fürth

=== Air pistol ===

Northern division	Southern division
Braunschweiger SG	ESV Weil am Rhein
Freischütz Wathlingen	HSG München
GTV Bremerhaven-Seestadtteufel	KKS Hambrücken
PSV Olympia Berlin	SGi Ludwigsburg
Sp.Sch. Fahrdorf	Sgi Waldenburg
Spsch Raesfeld	SSG Dynamit Fürth
SSG Teutoburger Wald	SV Altheim Waldhausen
SSV Bad Westernkotten	SV Kelheim-Gmünd
**SV 1935 Kriftel**	SV Murrhardt-Karnsberg
SV Bassum von 1848	SV Peiting
SV Falke Dasbach	SV Waldkirch
SV Schirumer Leegmoor	TSV Ötlingen - SpSchAbtl.

== Foreign shooters ==
Of the five shooters entered in a match, at least four must be German citizens. Despite this rule, many prominent foreigners participate in the league. The list of foreign shooters registered for the 2018–19 season includes the following shooters (although all did not compete in every match):

Name	Country	Discipline	Division	Club	Best Olympic result
Camilla Andersen	Denmark	Rifle	North	Braunschweiger SG 1545	
Katarina Bisercic	Serbia	Rifle	North	SV Olympia 72 Börm/Dörpstedt	
Jorge Diaz	Spain	Rifle	North	SB Freiheit	27th, men's air rifle 2016
Tomasz Bartnik	Poland	Rifle	North	SV Gölzau	
Maxime Brunin	Belgium	Rifle	North	SV Kamen	
Alexander Driagin	Russia	Rifle	North	SG 1920 Mengshausen	
Christoph Dürr	Switzerland	Rifle	South	FSG Kempten	
Živa Dvoršak	Slovenia	Rifle	South	SV Petersaurach	11th, women's air rifle 2012
Matthew Emmons	United States	Rifle	South	Der Bund München	1st, men's prone 2004
Judith Gomez	France	Rifle	South	KKS Königsbach	
Petar Gorša	Croatia	Rifle	North	SSG Kevelaer	7th, men's air rifle 2016
Mikkel Hansen	Denmark	Rifle	North	SV Olympia 72 Börm/Dörpstedt	
Peter Hellenbrand	Netherlands	Rifle	North	ST Hubertus Elsen	5th, men's air rifle 2012
Olivia Hofmann	Austria	Rifle	South	SV Niederlauterbach	5th, women's three positions 2016
Michael Höllwarth	Austria	Rifle	South	SV Petersaurach	
Illia Charheika	Belarus	Rifle	North	SV Gölzau	6th, men's air rifle 2016
Rikke Ibsen	Denmark	Rifle	North	Braunschweiger SG 1545	
Sergey Kamenskiy	Russia	Rifle	South	SV Pfeil Vöhringen	2nd, men's three positions 2016
Henrik Larsen	Norway	Rifle	North	SV Wieckenberg	
Petra Lustenberger	Switzerland	Rifle	South	SV Buch	
Jan Lochbihler	Switzerland	Rifle	North	SG 1920 Mengshausen	14th, men's prone 2016
Stephan Martz	Switzerland	Rifle	North	TuS Hilgert	
Thomas Mathis	Austria	Rifle	South	FSG Kempten	17h, men's prone 2016
Nikola Mazurová	Czech Republic	Rifle	South	SG Coburg	18th, women's air rifle 2016
Alin Moldoveanu	Romania	Rifle	North	SB Freiheit	1st, men's air rifle 2012
Mandy Mulder	Netherlands	Rifle	North	SG 1920 Mengshausen	
Elania Nardelli	Italy	Rifle	South	SSG Dynamit-Fürth	35th, women's three positions 2012
Agnieszka Nagay	Poland	Rifle	North	SV Kamen	8th, women's three positions 2012
Stine Nielsen	Denmark	Rifle	North	SV Wieckenberg	9th, women's air rifle 2012
Alena Niskoshapskaia	Russia	Rifle	North	SV Kamen	
Ayonika Paul	India	Rifle	South	SV Petersaurach	47th, women's air rifle 2016
István Péni	Hungary	Rifle	North	BSV Buer-Bülse	12th, men's three positions 2016
Daniela Demjen Pešková	Slovakia	Rifle	South	Kgl. Priv. FSG Titting	9th, women's air rifle 2008
Borna Petanjek	Croatia	Rifle	North	SB Freiheit	
Line Petermann	Denmark	Rifle	North	SV Olympia 72 Börm/Dörpstedt	
Pierre-Edmond Piasecki	France	Rifle	South	Der Bund München	6th, men's air rifle 2012
Bernhard Pickl	Austria	Rifle	South	SG Coburg	
Marlene Pribitzer	Austria	Rifle	South	Kgl. Priv. FSG Titting	
Sergey Richter	Israel	Rifle	North	SSG Kevelaer	9th, men's air rifle 2012
Anton Rizov	Belarus	Rifle	South	KKS Königsbach	22nd, men's air rifle 2012
Gernot Rumpler	Austria	Rifle	North	BSV Buer-Bülse	32nd, men's air rifle 2016
Milenko Sebić	Serbia	Rifle	South	SV Pfeil Vöhringen	11th, men's three positions 2016
Pea Smeets	Netherlands	Rifle	North	Wissener SV	
Peter Somogyl	Hungary	Rifle	South	Eichenlaub Saltendorf	
Milutin Stefanovic	Serbia	Rifle	North	TuS Hilgert	12th, men's air rifle 2016
Jenny Stene	Norway	Rifle	North	BSV Buer-Bülse	
Martin Strempfl	Austria	Rifle	South	SV Germania Prittlbach	
Nicolas Thiel	France	Rifle	North	SV Wieckenberg	
Oleh Tsarkov	Ukraine	Rifle	South	SV Pfeil Vöhringen	8th, men's air rifle 2016
Adam Veres	Hungary	Rifle	North	Wissener SV	
Sanja Vukasinovic	Serbia	Rifle	North	Wissener SV	
Gabriela Vognarová	Czech Republic	Rifle	South	Kgl. Priv. FSG Titting	
Simon Weithaler	Italy	Rifle	South	SV Niederlauterbach	
Georg Zott	Austria	Rifle	South	SSG Dynamit-Fürth	
Petra Zublasing	Italy	Rifle	North	TuS Hilgert	4th, women's three positions 2016
Fernanda Russo	Argentina	Rifle	South	FSG Kempten	20th, Shooting at the 2016 Summer Olympics – Women's 10 metre air rifle
Marcelo Julian Gutierrez	Argentina	Rifle	South	FSG Kempten	
