= Shooting at the 2015 European Games – Men's 50 metre rifle prone =

Men's 50 m rifle prone at the 2015 European Games
- Venue: Baku Shooting Centre
- Date: 16 June
- Competitors: 39 from 25 nations

Medalists
gold medal	Henri Junghänel	Germany
silver medal	Marco de Nicolo	Italy
bronze medal	Sergei Martynov	Belarus

The Men's 50 metre rifle prone competition at the 2015 European Games in Baku, Azerbaijan was held on 18 June at the Baku Shooting Centre.

== Schedule ==
All times are local (UTC+5).

Date	Time	Event
Thursday, 18 June 2015	11:30	Qualification
Thursday, 18 June 2015	13:30	Final

== Results ==
=== Qualification ===
Rank	Athlete	Series						Total	Note
Rank	Athlete	1	2	3	4	5	6	Total	Note
1	Sergei Martynov (BLR)	103.0	103.3	102.9	105.2	102.2	103.4	620.0	GR
2	Henri Junghänel (GER)	103.8	103.9	102.3	101.7	101.6	104.6	617.9	
3	Bojan Đurković (CRO)	104.9	103.9	103.1	101.9	100.4	102.9	617.1	
4	Guy Starik (ISR)	102.6	103.6	100.8	103.7	104.0	102.4	617.1	
5	Odd Arne Brekne (NOR)	102.2	103.9	102.3	102.3	104.1	102.2	617.0	
6	Juho Kurki (FIN)	102.7	103.5	102.6	102.8	103.7	101.7	617.0	
7	Marco De Nicolo (ITA)	103.5	101.6	102.4	103.3	102.1	103.3	616.2	
8	Meelis Kiisk (EST)	100.6	103.7	103.0	102.6	102.4	103.7	616.0	
9	Valérian Sauveplane (FRA)	103.8	101.5	103.2	102.4	102.7	102.4	616.0	
10	Thomas Mathis (AUT)	102.6	103.7	101.1	101.0	103.6	103.6	615.6	
11	Péter Sidi (HUN)	103.1	104.6	101.7	99.1	101.8	105.1	615.4	
12	Yury Shcherbatsevich (BLR)	103.0	103.8	101.9	102.0	103.0	101.7	615.4	
13	Yuriy Sukhorukov (UKR)	102.8	103.1	100.6	100.5	104.1	103.2	614.3	
14	Milenko Sebić (SRB)	102.8	99.4	102.5	103.7	103.6	102.3	614.3	
15	Rajmond Debevec (SLO)	102.0	101.5	101.5	102.6	103.7	102.8	614.1	
16	Nemanja Mirosavljev (SRB)	104.9	100.7	102.3	102.3	100.8	103.0	614.0	
17	Alexis Raynaud (FRA)	100.1	103.7	102.7	101.2	103.0	102.9	613.6	
18	Ivica Štritof (CRO)	102.1	102.4	100.6	103.5	102.5	102.5	613.6	
19	Lionel Cox (BEL)	102.7	103.1	99.9	101.9	104.5	101.4	613.5	
20	Jonathan Hammond (GBR)	103.9	101.6	103.5	98.3	102.1	103.4	612.8	
21	Niccolò Campriani (ITA)	100.0	103.5	102.4	101.8	102.4	102.5	612.6	
22	Claude-Alain Delley (SUI)	103.6	100.2	102.1	102.6	101.5	102.4	612.4	
23	Sergey Kamenskiy (RUS)	104.0	102.5	102.4	101.3	101.3	100.7	612.2	
24	Fedor Vlasov (RUS)	101.9	102.3	101.8	103.4	100.2	101.9	611.5	
25	Javier López (ESP)	102.1	102.0	101.7	103.8	101.0	100.5	611.1	
26	Ondřej Rozsypal (CZE)	102.2	100.3	103.1	100.2	102.4	102.4	610.6	
27	Daniel Brodmeier (GER)	101.0	98.8	102.2	103.1	104.3	101.0	610.4	
28	Stian Bogar (NOR)	100.3	100.8	101.4	102.5	103.0	102.0	610.0	
29	Leor Ovadia Madlal (ISR)	101.9	100.0	102.1	103.1	102.3	100.6	610.0	
30	Dawid Migała (POL)	100.4	99.5	100.6	101.9	103.6	103.7	609.7	
31	Alexander Schmirl (AUT)	102.2	100.3	100.8	99.6	103.7	102.8	609.4	
32	Serhiy Kulish (UKR)	99.5	102.9	101.1	100.7	102.6	101.9	608.7	
33	Steffen Olsen (DEN)	101.8	99.4	100.1	100.3	103.9	101.9	607.4	
34	Anton Rizov (BUL)	101.9	103.6	99.7	101.8	98.1	101.2	606.3	
35	Sam Andersson (SWE)	97.7	99.7	102.8	101.1	102.0	102.3	605.6	
36	Kenneth Nielsen (DEN)	101.6	104.6	101.1	98.4	98.6	101.0	605.3	
37	Simon Beyeler (SUI)	98.6	100.7	100.1	100.3	102.9	100.7	603.3	

=== Final ===
Rank	Athlete	Series									Notes
Rank	Athlete	1	2	3	4	5	6	7	8	9	Notes
1st place, gold medalist(s)	Henri Junghänel (GER)	31.0	62.8	83.9	105.2	125.9	146.0	166.9	187.1	208.5	GR
2nd place, silver medalist(s)	Marco De Nicolo (ITA)	31.3	62.1	83.1	104.5	125.7	146.4	167.2	187.2	207.3	
3rd place, bronze medalist(s)	Sergei Martynov (BLR)	31.9	63.1	83.8	104.2	125.1	145.9	165.9	186.3		
4	Bojan Đurković (CRO)	30.9	61.2	82.2	103.1	123.2	143.6	164.2			
5	Odd Arne Brekne (NOR)	31.7	62.0	82.6	102.9	123.8	142.5				
6	Guy Starik (ISR)	29.8	61.5	82.0	102.0	122.5					
7	Juho Kurki (FIN)	30.9	60.9	81.6	101.4						
8	Meelis Kiisk (EST)	30.4	61.1	80.2							
