= Shooting at the 2019 European Games – Men's 10 metre air rifle =

Men's 10 metre air rifle at the 2019 European Games
- Venue: Shooting Centre
- Dates: 24 June
- Competitors: 40 from 26 nations
- Winning score: 250.8

Medalists
| gold medal | Sergy Rikhter | Israel |
| silver medal | Sergey Kamenskiy | Russia |
| bronze medal | Filip Nepejchal | Czech Republic |

The men's 10 metre air rifle event at the 2019 European Games in Minsk, Belarus took place on 24 June at the Shooting Centre.

== Schedule ==
All times are local (UTC+3).

| Date | Time | Event |
|---|---|---|
| Monday, 24 June 2019 | 12:00 | Qualification |
| Monday, 24 June 2019 | 14:00 | Final |

== Records ==
Prior to this competition, the existing world, European and Games records were as follows.

Qualification
| World Record | Péter Sidi (HUN) | 633.5 | Munich, Germany | 25 May 2013 |
| European Record | Péter Sidi (HUN) | 633.5 | Munich, Germany | 25 May 2013 |
| Games Record | Hrachik Babayan (ARM) | 629.3 | Baku, Azerbaijan | 16 June 2015 |
Final
| World Record | Alexander Dryagin (RUS) | 251.2 | Changwon, South Korea | 22 April 2018 |
| European Record | Alexander Dryagin (RUS) | 251.2 | Changwon, South Korea | 22 April 2018 |
| Games Record | ISSF Rule changed on 01.01.2018 | — | — | — |

== Results ==
=== Qualification ===
| Rank | Athlete | Country | 1 | 2 | 3 | 4 | 5 | 6 | Total | Notes |
|---|---|---|---|---|---|---|---|---|---|---|
| 1 | Sergey Kamenskiy | Russia | 103.4 | 104.8 | 106.5 | 104.9 | 105.7 | 105.8 | 631.1 | Q, GR |
| 2 | Filip Nepejchal | Czech Republic | 104.5 | 106.0 | 105.8 | 103.8 | 105.4 | 104.7 | 630.2 | Q |
| 3 | Vegard Nordhagen | Norway | 104.0 | 104.2 | 104.6 | 106.4 | 104.7 | 105.7 | 629.6 | Q |
| 4 | Vladimir Maslennikov | Russia | 104.8 | 105.2 | 105.3 | 104.7 | 105.4 | 103.7 | 629.1 | Q |
| 5 | Sergy Rikhter | Israel | 104.7 | 104.2 | 105.6 | 105.2 | 104.5 | 104.6 | 628.8 | Q |
| 6 | Patrik Jány | Slovakia | 104.3 | 105.0 | 104.0 | 104.3 | 104.9 | 105.3 | 627.8 | Q |
| 7 | Peter Hellenbrand | Netherlands | 104.1 | 105.4 | 105.2 | 104.4 | 104.7 | 104.0 | 627.8 | Q |
| 8 | Péter Sidi | Hungary | 104.8 | 104.3 | 104.9 | 104.8 | 105.7 | 103.3 | 627.8 | Q |
| 9 | Henrik Larsen | Norway | 105.1 | 105.1 | 103.9 | 104.3 | 104.5 | 104.5 | 627.4 | |
| 10 | Petr Nymburský | Czech Republic | 104.2 | 103.7 | 105.6 | 105.2 | 104.2 | 104.4 | 627.3 | |
| 11 | Serhiy Kulish | Ukraine | 104.2 | 102.5 | 105.9 | 105.6 | 104.4 | 104.5 | 627.1 | |
| 12 | Lorenzo Bacci | Italy | 103.7 | 105.5 | 102.9 | 105.2 | 105.2 | 104.0 | 626.5 | |
| 13 | Illia Charheika | Belarus | 102.7 | 104.9 | 105.1 | 103.0 | 105.6 | 104.8 | 626.1 | |
| 14 | Brian Baudouin | France | 104.2 | 104.0 | 104.8 | 104.2 | 104.7 | 104.2 | 626.1 | |
| 15 | István Péni | Hungary | 104.5 | 103.8 | 104.4 | 103.2 | 105.0 | 104.8 | 625.7 | |
| 16 | Anton Rizov | Bulgaria | 104.4 | 104.1 | 104.5 | 104.9 | 104.1 | 103.5 | 625.5 | |
| 17 | Tomasz Bartnik | Poland | 103.7 | 102.4 | 104.5 | 105.2 | 103.9 | 105.6 | 625.3 | |
| 18 | Marcus Madsen | Sweden | 103.9 | 104.3 | 105.2 | 104.3 | 103.9 | 103.4 | 625.0 | |
| 19 | Juho Kurki | Finland | 104.8 | 103.7 | 102.4 | 103.5 | 105.3 | 104.9 | 624.6 | |
| 20 | Milutin Stefanović | Serbia | 103.4 | 104.5 | 104.5 | 104.0 | 102.8 | 105.3 | 624.5 | |
| 21 | Petar Gorša | Croatia | 104.1 | 104.2 | 103.8 | 103.8 | 105.0 | 103.5 | 624.4 | |
| 22 | Pierre Edmond Piasecki | France | 105.0 | 103.9 | 104.2 | 104.2 | 104.6 | 102.1 | 624.0 | |
| 23 | Milenko Sebić | Serbia | 102.3 | 104.3 | 104.6 | 103.0 | 104.8 | 104.9 | 623.9 | |
| 24 | Hrachik Babayan | Armenia | 101.9 | 105.0 | 103.3 | 105.3 | 104.0 | 104.1 | 623.6 | |
| 25 | Alin Moldoveanu | Romania | 105.3 | 102.7 | 104.3 | 103.7 | 103.7 | 103.5 | 623.2 | |
| 26 | Martin Strempfl | Austria | 105.3 | 102.9 | 103.1 | 104.3 | 104.0 | 103.5 | 623.1 | |
| 27 | Bernhard Pickl | Austria | 103.2 | 105.2 | 105.5 | 105.1 | 102.2 | 101.9 | 623.1 | |
| 28 | Miran Maričić | Croatia | 103.3 | 103.9 | 103.4 | 103.2 | 103.7 | 105.0 | 622.5 | |
| 29 | Oleh Tsarkov | Ukraine | 104.4 | 103.6 | 103.0 | 103.2 | 103.7 | 104.1 | 622.0 | |
| 30 | Jan Lochbihler | Switzerland | 103.0 | 102.6 | 105.2 | 104.9 | 102.3 | 103.5 | 621.5 | |
| 31 | Julian Justus | Germany | 102.7 | 104.1 | 103.4 | 104.1 | 103.3 | 103.7 | 621.3 | |
| 32 | Andre Link | Germany | 103.3 | 104.3 | 102.8 | 103.0 | 103.6 | 103.3 | 620.3 | |
| 33 | Steffen Olsen | Denmark | 103.3 | 102.6 | 102.4 | 103.8 | 103.1 | 104.9 | 620.1 | |
| 34 | Vitali Bubnovich | Belarus | 103.4 | 104.3 | 101.1 | 102.7 | 104.1 | 103.9 | 619.5 | |
| 35 | Riccardo Armiraglio | Italy | 102.5 | 103.4 | 102.8 | 103.3 | 103.6 | 103.8 | 619.4 | |
| 36 | Christoph Dürr | Switzerland | 101.9 | 102.4 | 105.4 | 103.3 | 103.4 | 102.8 | 619.2 | |
| 37 | Mikkel Damholt Hansen | Denmark | 102.7 | 102.6 | 102.9 | 104.0 | 103.1 | 102.4 | 617.7 | |
| 38 | Karolis Girulis | Lithuania | 100.9 | 101.1 | 103.9 | 104.3 | 102.9 | 103.9 | 617.0 | |
| 39 | Nedžad Džanković | Bosnia and Herzegovina | 104.3 | 102.4 | 103.6 | 101.3 | 103.8 | 99.2 | 614.6 | |
| 40 | Nemanja Obradović | Montenegro | 103.4 | 100.0 | 101.4 | 103.4 | 102.0 | 101.6 | 611.8 | |

=== Final ===
| Rank | Athlete | Series | | | | | | | | | Total | Notes |
| Rank | Athlete | 1 | 2 | 3 | 4 | 5 | 6 | 7 | 8 | 9 | Total | Notes |
|---|---|---|---|---|---|---|---|---|---|---|---|---|
| 1st place, gold medalist(s) | Sergy Rikhter (ISR) | 51.5 | 52.9 | 20.4 | 20.8 | 20.9 | 21.1 | 20.8 | 21.0 | 21.4 | 250.8 | GR |
| 1st place, gold medalist(s) | Sergy Rikhter (ISR) | 51.5 | 104.4 | 124.8 | 145.6 | 166.5 | 187.6 | 208.4 | 229.4 | 250.8 | 250.8 | GR |
| 2nd place, silver medalist(s) | Sergey Kamenskiy (RUS) | 52.0 | 51.6 | 20.6 | 21.2 | 20.6 | 21.2 | 20.8 | 21.1 | 20.9 | 250.0 | |
| 2nd place, silver medalist(s) | Sergey Kamenskiy (RUS) | 52.0 | 103.6 | 124.2 | 145.4 | 166.0 | 187.2 | 208.0 | 229.1 | 250.0 | 250.0 | |
| 3rd place, bronze medalist(s) | Filip Nepejchal (CZE) | 52.8 | 52.2 | 21.2 | 21.0 | 20.3 | 20.3 | 20.9 | 20.2 | | 228.9 | |
| 3rd place, bronze medalist(s) | Filip Nepejchal (CZE) | 52.8 | 105.0 | 126.2 | 147.2 | 167.5 | 187.8 | 208.7 | 228.9 | | 228.9 | |
| 4 | Péter Sidi (HUN) | 51.7 | 52.9 | 20.1 | 20.7 | 21.4 | 20.6 | 20.2 | | | 207.6 | |
| 4 | Péter Sidi (HUN) | 51.7 | 104.6 | 124.7 | 145.4 | 166.8 | 187.4 | 207.6 | | | 207.6 | |
| 5 | Vegard Nordhagen (NOR) | 51.3 | 53.0 | 20.6 | 21.0 | 21.0 | 19.9 | | | | 186.8 | |
| 5 | Vegard Nordhagen (NOR) | 51.3 | 104.3 | 124.9 | 145.9 | 166.9 | 186.8 | | | | 186.8 | |
| 6 | Vladimir Maslennikov (RUS) | 51.3 | 51.5 | 20.8 | 21.2 | 21.1 | | | | | 165.9 | |
| 6 | Vladimir Maslennikov (RUS) | 51.3 | 102.8 | 123.6 | 144.8 | 165.9 | | | | | 165.9 | |
| 7 | Patrik Jány (SVK) | 52.1 | 51.2 | 20.8 | 20.4 | | | | | | 144.5 | |
| 7 | Patrik Jány (SVK) | 52.1 | 103.3 | 124.1 | 144.5 | | | | | | 144.5 | |
| 8 | Peter Hellenbrand (NED) | 50.2 | 51.9 | 21.4 | | | | | | | 123.5 | |
| 8 | Peter Hellenbrand (NED) | 50.2 | 102.1 | 123.5 | | | | | | | 123.5 | |
