= Çiğdem Özyaman =

Turkish sport shooter (born 1985)

Personal information
- Nationality: Turkish
- Born: 7 October 1985 (age 40) Düzce, Turkey
- Education: Selçuk University
- Occupation: Teacher of physical education
- Years active: 2001-present
- Height: 170 cm (5 ft 7 in)
- Weight: 62 kg (137 lb)

Sport
- Country: Turkey
- Sport: Shotgun shooting
- Event: Skeet
- Coached by: Diego Gasperini
Medal record
Women's Shooting
Representing Turkey
European Shooting Championships
Gold medal – first place	2011 Belgrade	Skeet
Bronze medal – third place	2004 Nicosia	J Skeet
IPSC European Shotgun Championship
Silver medal – second place	2013 Suhl	Skeet
Mediterranean Games
Silver medal – second place	2026 Taranto	Skeet

Çiğdem Özyaman (born 7 October 1985 in Düzce, Turkey), also known as Çiğdem Özyaman Özenir after her marriage, is a Turkish sport shooter competing in the skeet event. The 170 cm (5 ft 7 in) tall athlete at 62 kg (137 lb) is right-handed.

== Sport career ==
She began sport shooting at the age of 14 with her father's encouragement. She serves as a teacher of physical education in a primary school at Bolu after her graduation from Selçuk University.

Özyaman qualified for the skeet event at the 2012 Summer Olympics by virtue of her gold medal at the 2011 European Shooting Championships held in Belgrade, Serbia. She was one of the first two Turkish women Olympic sport shooters; the other being Nihan Kantarcı, who was selected to compete in the trap event. SHe won the silver medal at the 2013 European Shotgun Championships in Suhl, Germany.

== Achievements ==
Year	Competition	Venue	Position	Notes
Representing Turkey
2004	European Championships	Nicosia, Cyprus	3rd	J
2005	ISSF World Championships	Lonato, Italy	8th	J
2005	European Championships	Belgrade, Serbia	6th	J
2007	European Championships	Granada, Spain	8th	
2011	ISSF World Cup 2	Beijing, China	7th	
2011	European Championships	Belgrade, Serbia	1st	
2013	IPSC European Shotgun Championship	Suhl, Germany	2nd	
2023	ISSF World Championships	Baku, Azerbaijan	7th	Team
