= Andrei Kazak =

Belarusian sports shooter

Personal information
- Full name: Andrei Heorhievich Kazak
- Nationality: Belarus
- Born: 13 March 1980 (age 46) Hrodna, Byelorussian SSR, Soviet Union
- Height: 1.68 m (5 ft 6 in)
- Weight: 60 kg (132 lb)

Sport
- Sport: Shooting
- Events: 10 m running target (10RT); 50 m pistol (FP)
- Club: Dynamo Hrodna
- Coached by: Aleh Pishchukevich

Andrei Heorhievich Kazak (Belarusian: Андрэй Георгіевіч Казак; born 13 March 1980) is a Belarusian sport shooter. Kazak made his official debut for the 2004 Summer Olympics in Athens, where he competed in the men's 10 m running target, a shooting event which has since been removed from the Olympic events. Kazak shot 292 targets in the slow-run and 283 in the fast-run for a total score of 575 points, finishing only in ninth place.

Eight years after competing in his last Olympics, Kazak qualified for his second Belarusian team, as a 32-year-old, at the 2012 Summer Olympics in London, by placing ninth in the free pistol from the sixth meet of the 2011 ISSF World Cup series in Munich, Germany. Kazak scored a total of 547 targets in the qualifying rounds of the men's 50 m pistol, by two inner tens behind his teammate Kanstantsin Lukashyk, finishing in thirty-first place.
