= Rosa Peña Rocamontes =

Mexican sports shooter

Rosa del Carmen Peña Rocamontes
Personal information
- Born: 19 September 1994 (age 31) Saltillo, Mexico

Sport
- Sport: Sports shooting

Rosa del Carmen Peña Rocamontes (born 19 September 1994) is a Mexican sports shooter. She competed in the Women's 10 metre air rifle event at the 2012 Summer Olympics.
