= Beata Bartków-Kwiatkowska =

Polish sport shooter

Beata Bartków-Kwiatkowska (born 22 November 1981 in Bielsko-Biała) is a Polish sport shooter. At the 2012 Summer Olympics, she competed in the Women's 10 metre air pistol and the Women's 25 metre pistol.

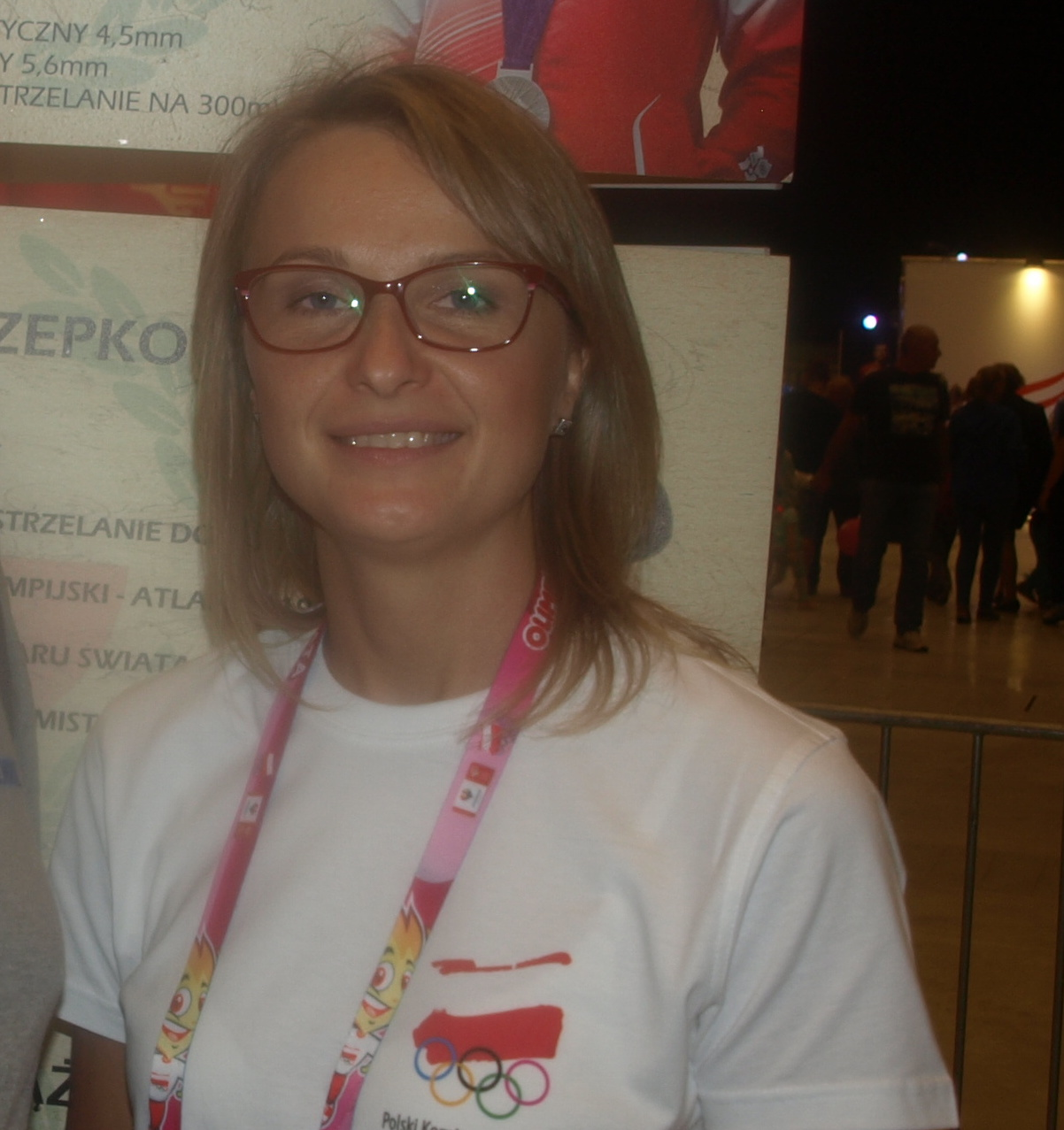
Beata Bartków-Kwiatkowska

== Olympic results ==
Event	2012
25 metre pistol	35th 567
10 metre air pistol	44th 366
