= Stephanie Obermoser =

Austrian sports shooter (born 1988)

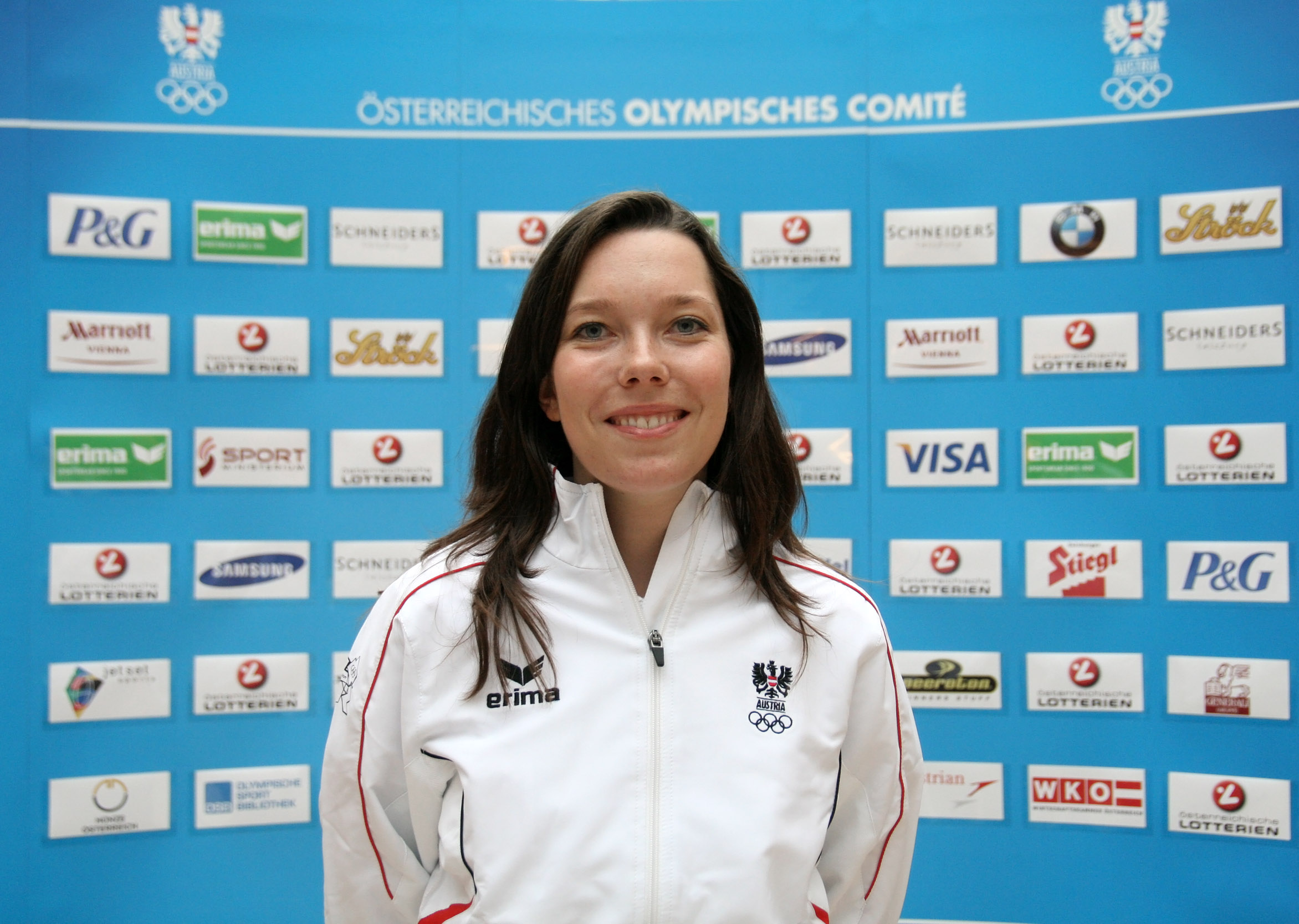

Personal information
- Born: 14 October 1988 (age 37) St. Johann in Tirol, Austria

Sport
- Sport: Sports shooting

Stephanie Obermoser (born 14 October 1988) is an Austrian sports shooter. She competed in the Women's 10 metre air rifle and women's 50 metre rifle three positions events at the 2012 Summer Olympics.
