= Cory Niefer =

Canadian sports shooter

Personal information
- Born: 18 October 1975 (age 50) Yorkton, Saskatchewan, Canada

Sport
- Sport: Sports shooting

Cory Niefer (born 18 October 1975) is a Canadian sports shooter. He competed in the Men's 10 metre air rifle, and also the 50 m rifle prone events at the 2012 Summer Olympics. He was the first individual Canadian to qualify for the 2012 Olympics.
