= Alexander Dryagin =

Russian sport shooter

Personal information
- Nationality: Russian
- Born: 18 November 1990 (age 35) Kushva, Russia
- Height: 1.79 m (5 ft 10 in)
- Weight: 79 kg (174 lb)

Sport
- Country: Russia
- Sport: Shooting
- Event: Air rifle
- Club: Dinamo
Medal record
World Championships
| Silver medal – second place | 2018 Changwon | 10 m team air rifle |
European Championships
| Gold medal – first place | 2020 Wroclaw | 10 m team air rifle |

Alexander Valeryevich Dryagin (Russian: Александр Валерьевич Дрягин; born 18 November 1990) is a Russian sport shooter.

He participated at the 2018 ISSF World Shooting Championships.
