= Petya Lukanova =

Bulgarian sports shooter

Personal information
- Born: 20 July 1969 (age 56) Pazardzhik, Bulgaria

Sport
- Sport: Sports shooting
- Coached by: Aleksandar Lukanov

Petya Lukanova (Bulgarian: Петя Луканова; born 20 July 1969) is a Bulgarian sports shooter.

== Competition ==
She competed in the Women's 10 metre air rifle and Women's 50 metre rifle three positions events at the 2012 Summer Olympics, finishing in 40th in the 10 metre event and 30th in the 50 metre event.
