= Athina Douka =

Greek sport shooter (born 1976)

Athina Douka (Greek: Αθηνα Δουκα; born 18 November 1976 in Eleusis) is a Greek female sport shooter. At the 2012 Summer Olympics, she competed in the Women's 10 metre air pistol.
