= Dhaher Al-Aryani =

Emirati sport shooter (born 1972)

Medal record

Men's shooting

Representing United Arab Emirates

Asian Championships
Gold medal – first place	2014 Al-Ain	Trap team
Bronze medal – third place	2013 Almaty	Trap team

Dhaher al-Aryani (born 11 December 1972 in Ras al-Khaimah) is an Emirati trap shooter. He competed in the trap event at the 2012 Summer Olympics and placed 32nd in the qualification round.
