= Alexei Kamenski =

Russian sport shooter

Alexei Kamenski is a Russian sport shooter. (Note: "Alexei Kamenski". London 2012. The London Organising Committee of the Olympic Games and Paralympic Games Limited.) He competed at the 2012 Summer Olympics in the Men's 10 metre air rifle.
