= Jessica Mager =

German sports shooter

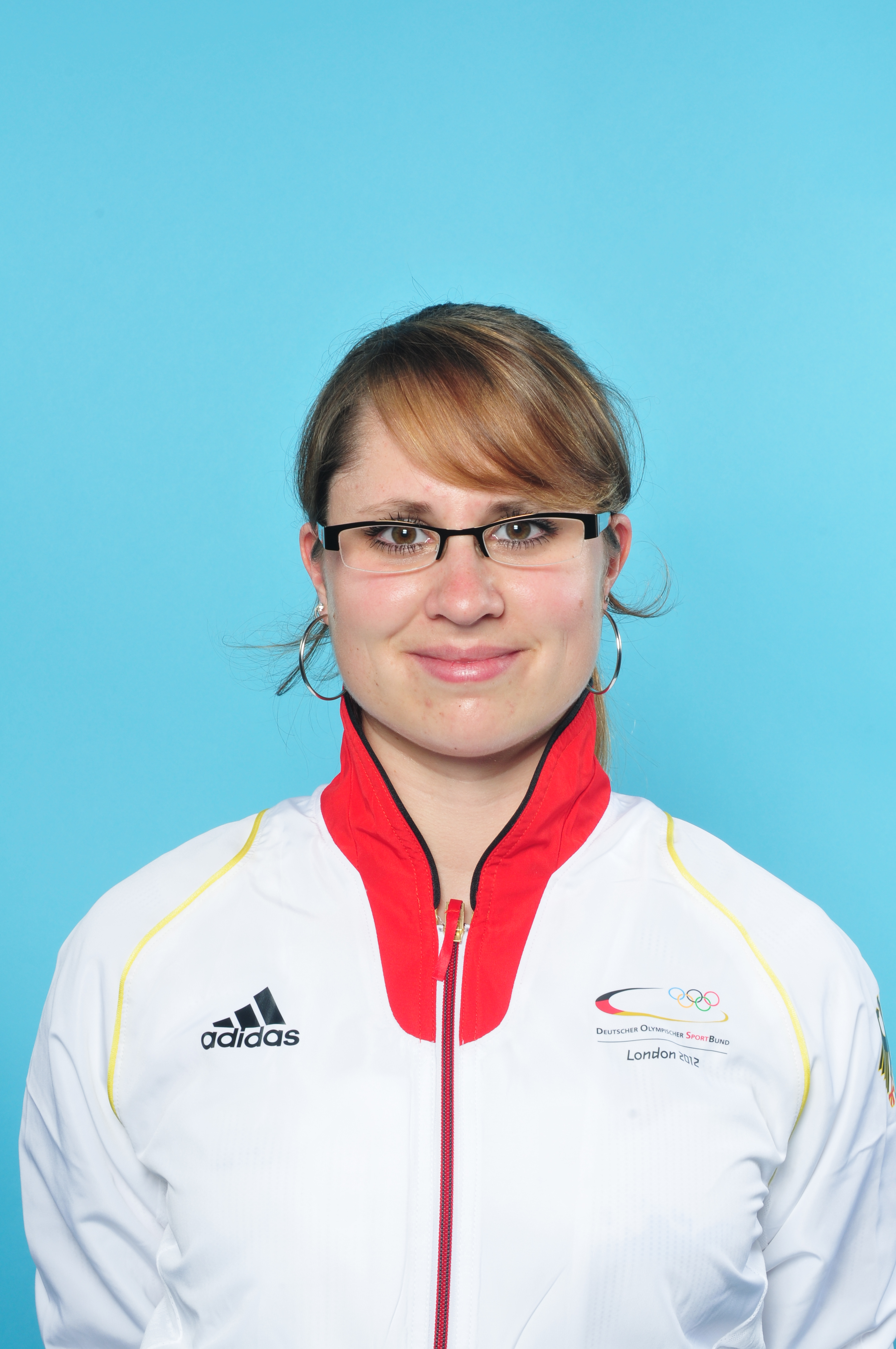
- Jessica Mager in 2012

Personal information
- Born: 1 June 1988 (age 38) Solingen, West Germany

Sport
- Sport: Sports shooting

Jessica Mager (born 1 June 1988) is a German sports shooter. She competed in the Women's 10 metre air rifle event at the 2012 Summer Olympics.
