= Émilie Évesque =

French sports shooter (born 1988)

Personal information
- Born: 23 September 1988 (age 37) Montpellier, France

Sport
- Sport: Sports shooting

Émilie Évesque (born 23 September 1988) is a French sports shooter. She competed in the Women's 10 metre air rifle and the women's 50 m three positions events at the 2012 Summer Olympics.
