= Patrick Scheuber =

Swiss sport shooter

Patrick Scheuber (born 10 December 1986, Stans) is a Swiss sport shooter who competes in the men's 10 metre air pistol. At the 2012 Summer Olympics, he finished 32nd in the qualifying round, failing to make the cut for the final.
