= Sergey Richter =

Israeli sport shooter (born 1989)

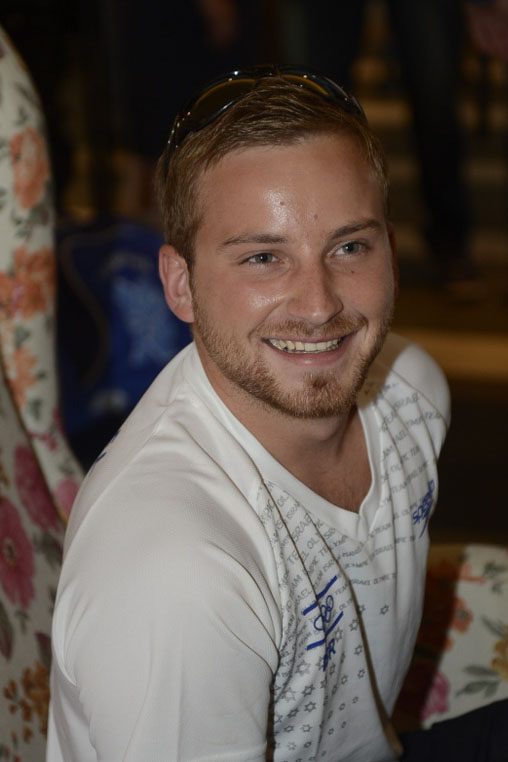
- Richter in 2012

Personal information
- Native name: Сергій Ріхтер סרגיי ריכטר
- Nickname: Serjo
- Nationality: Israeli
- Born: 23 April 1989 (age 37) Kharkiv, Ukrainian SSR, Soviet Union
- Height: 1.80 m (5 ft 11 in)
- Weight: 83 kg (183 lb)

Sport
- Country: Israel
- Sport: Sport shooting
- Event: 10 metre air rifle
- Club: Maccabi Ra'anana Shooting Club
- Coached by: Guy Starik and Yevgeni Aleinikov
Medal record
Men's shooting
Representing Israel
European Games
Gold medal – first place	2019 Minsk	Men's 10m Air Rifle
Bronze medal – third place	2015 Baku	Men's 10m Air Rifle
European Championships
Gold medal – first place	2013 Odense	Men's 10m Air Rifle
Gold medal – first place	2022 Hamar	Mixed 10m Air Rifle
Silver medal – second place	2021 Osijek	Men's 10m Air Rifle
Silver medal – second place	2023 Tallinn	Mixed 10m Air Rifle
Bronze medal – third place	2020 Wrocław	Men's 10m Air Rifle

Sergey Richter (Hebrew: סרגיי ריכטר; Ukrainian: Сергій Ріхтер; born 23 April 1989) is an Olympic sport shooter. Born in Ukraine, he represents Israel internationally.

He shares the junior world record in the 10 metre air rifle, and was the 2009 ISSF World Cup champion. He competed on behalf of Israel at the 2012 Summer Olympics in London, for Israel at the 2016 Summer Olympics in Rio de Janeiro, and for Israel at the 2020 Summer Olympics in Tokyo. He won the gold medals in the 2013 European Championship and the 2022 European Championship, and was named European Champion at 10m. He won a bronze medal at the 2015 European Games for Israel, and the gold medal at the 2019 European Games for Israel in the Men's 10m Air Rifle. He is a nine-time Israeli air rifle champion. Richter represented Israel at the 2024 Paris Olympics in Men's 10 metre air rifle, and came in 33rd.

== Early and personal life ==
Richter was born in Kharkiv in the Ukrainian SSR of the Soviet Union, immigrated with his family to Bat Yam, Israel when he was a six-year-old boy in 1996, and has lived in Rehovot and Kfar Saba, Israel. He is Jewish and an Israeli citizen. Richter attended Wizo High School, in Rehovot. When his parents were young, his mother, Svetlana, was a figure skater and his father, Alexander, was a wrestler. In 2011, his father developed colon cancer. He said: "It was terrible. It is impossible to describe in words how difficult it is to deal with when it is at your home... In my conversations with him, he asked me not to stop and continue in the sport, but it was very difficult for me." He is married to Natalie whom he married after the Rio Olympic Games, and he and his wife have twin girls.

== Shooting career ==
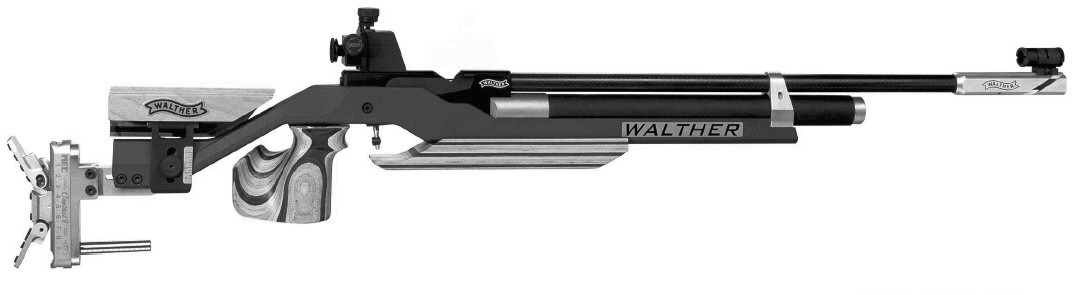
A typical 10 m match air rifle

Richter began shooting in 2002, at 13 years of age, as part of a Gadna (Israel Defense Forces youth corps) program. He then trained with Hapoel Rehovot.

Richter trains at the Herzliya firing range, and is now a member of Maccabi Ra'anana. He is right-handed, and his "master eye" is his right eye. He is coached by Israeli three-time Olympian Guy Starik and Yevgeni Aleinikov. His club is Maccabi Ra'anana Shooting Club.

=== 2003–12; Early years ===
Richter won a gold medal at 20 years of age at the 10 metre air rifle men's final of the 2009 ISSF World Cup in Munich, Germany.

His qualification score of 599 points out of 600 was one point short of the world record, and tied the junior world record. Richter won with 701.7 points. It was only his first shot that was not perfect. Richter said after the match: “This is exciting, I did not expect to finish on the highest step of the podium. This is my fourth time in an international competition!” In the 2006 10m Air Rifle Men Junior World Championships in Zagreb, Croatia, he came in 4th, with a score of 591. He was signed to the German shooting team Kolber that same year.

In February 2010, Richter won the gold medal in the IWK Air Gun competition men's 10 metre air rifle match in Munich, Germany. In June 2010, he came in fourth in the men's 10 metre air rifle final at the 2010 International Shooting Sport Federation (ISSF) World Cup in Belgrade, Serbia, missing the bronze medal by one-tenth of a point. In June 2011, he was ranked fifth in the world by the ISSF.

Richter competed in the September 2011 ISSF World Cup final in the men's 10 metre air rifle. He received a two-point deduction for being late to the final, which moved him down from second and a silver medal, to seventh place. He won a silver medal at the 2011 Changwon, South Korea, World Cup, with 597 points, becoming the first Israeli athlete to qualify for the London Olympics.

In April 2012, Richter won the silver medal in the 2012 Shooting World Cup in London, in men's 10 metre air rifle. His 701.1 points were a personal record.

=== 2012 London Olympics ===
Richter competed on behalf of Israel at the 2012 Summer Olympics in London in men's 10 metre air rifle, having qualified by earning a quota place. He missed the finals by one point, coming in 9th out of 30 competitors, with 8 shooters making it into the final. After the Olympics, he planned to complete his military service, and to study graphic design.

=== 2013–16; European champion ===
In March 2013, Richter won a gold medal in the European Championship in Odense, Denmark, and was named European Champion at 10 m. In April 2013, he won a silver medal at a 2013 World Cup tournament in Changwon, South Korea, in 10m Air Rifle. In 2013 and 2014 he also won bronze medals at World Cup tournaments in Fort Benning, Georgia.

On 16 June 2015, he took the bronze medal at the 2015 European Games in Baku, Azerbaijan, for Israel in the Men's 10m Air Rifle.

At the 2016 Baku World Cup, Richter won a bronze medal in 10m Air Rifle individual.

=== 2016 Rio de Janeiro Olympics ===
Richter competed for Israel at the 2016 Summer Olympics in Rio de Janeiro. He came in 14th out of 30 competitors in the Men's 10-meter air rifle competition with a score of 623.28 points, and coming in 15th out of 30 competitors with a score of 622.6 in the Men's 50m rifle prone competition.

=== 2019–20; European Games champion ===
On 24 June 2019, Richter took the gold medal at the 2019 European Games in Minsk, Belarus, for Israel in the Men's 10m Air Rifle.

At the 2020 European Championship in Wrocław, Poland, Richter won a bronze medal in the 10m Air Rifle individual.

=== 2020 Tokyo Olympics (in 2021) ===
Richter competed for Israel at the 2020 Summer Olympics in July 2021, in Tokyo, Japan. Richter finished 27th out of 47 competitors in the Men's 10 metre air rifle with a score of 624.5.

=== 2021–22; European championship ===
At the 2021 European Championship in Osijek, Croatia, Richter won a silver medal in the 10m Air Rifle individual. As of July 2021, he was ranked 8th in the world by the International Shooting Sport Federation (ISSF).

At a World Cup in Rio de Janeiro in 2022, Richter won a silver medal in 10m Air Rifle Men. At the 2022 Changwon World Cup, he won a bronze medal in 10m Air Rifle individual and a bronze medal in Mixed Team. At the 2022 Granada Grand Prix, he won the gold medal in 10m Air Rifle individual. In the 2022 European Championships 10m Air Rifle Mixed Team, he won the gold medal in Hamar, Norway, while coming in fourth in the individual.

=== 2023; Withdrawal from Indonesia competition ===
In 2023, Richter withdrew from an international competition in Jakarta, Indonesia, after the ISSF refused to allow him to compete with any symbols representing Israel. His rifle is engraved with the Israeli flag and the letters ISR. The Israeli Shooting Association told the Indonesian organizers: "Either we participate with a flag, or all the other countries participate without a flag just like us." In order to qualify for the 2024 Olympic Games in Paris, athletes are required to compete in a series of four World Cup meets, of which Jakarta was the first in this cycle. Reportedly, World Cup organizers informed Richter and the Israeli federation they would only allow him to participate with his weapon if he competes with identification symbols of the ISSF or the flag of the International Olympic Committee. Richter rebuffed the ISSF and chose not to compete in the World Cup, in part stating:

I will never accept to participate in a competition without the [IOC Country Code] ISR on my competition suit, on my personal rifle and on the results screen…I start the most important year on the way to Paris, when my opponents take a professional advantage over me due to political problems. If the Olympic movement, which advocates the existence of sports without distinctions of nationality, religion, race and sex, does not support its ideology, then what is its value? I don't understand how the state is allowed to organize some sort of competition with a national identity restriction. If there was a competition in Israel, and we boycotted some country - oh my - all the athletes would stand up and go out in a protest.

At the world championships in 2023 in Baku, Richter came in 4th in the 10m Air Rifle Mixed Team, and 17th in the 10m Air Rifle Men. At the 2023 European Championship in Tallinn, Estonia, Richter won a silver medal in the 10m Air Rifle Mixed Team, and came in 4th in the individual. At the 2023 Rio de Janeiro World Cup, he won a bronze medal in 10m Air Rifle Mixed Team. At the 2023 Cairo World Cup, he came in 4th in 10m Air Rifle individual.

=== 2024–present; Paris Olympics ===
At the 2024 Ruse, Bulgaria Grand Prix, he won the silver medal in the 10m Air Rifle individual. As of June 2024, Richter was a nine-time Israeli air rifle champion.

Richter represented Israel at the 2024 Paris Olympics in Men's 10 metre air rifle. He ranked 13th in the Olympic rankings prior to the competition. He came in 33rd with a score of 626.4.

=== Current world record in 10 m air rifle ===
Current world records held in 10 m Air Rifle
Junior Men	Individual	599	Cheon Min-ho (KOR); Zhu Qinan (CHN); Zhu Qinan (CHN); Sergey Richter (ISR)	24 April 2004; 16 August 2004; 30 October 2004; 16 May 2009	Athens (GRE); Athens (GRE); Bangkok (THA); Munich (GER)

== See also ==
- List of select Jewish shooters
- List of 2015 European Games medal winners
- List of medalists at the European Shooting Championships
