= Jorge Díaz (sport shooter) =

Spanish sports shooter

Personal information
- Born: 26 November 1985 (age 39)

Sport
- Sport: Sports shooting

Jorge Díaz (born 26 November 1985) is a Spanish sports shooter. He competed in the men's 10 metre air rifle event at the 2016 Summer Olympics.
