= Elania Nardelli =

Italian sport shooter

Personal information
- Nationality: Italian
- Born: 7 July 1987 (age 39) Foggia, Italy

Sport
- Country: Italy
- Sport: Shooting
- Event: 10 metre air rifle
- Club: G.S. Marina Militare
Medal record
World Championships
Bronze medal – third place	2010 Munich	10 m air rifle

Elania Nardelli (born 7 July 1987) is an Italian sport shooter. Born in Foggia, she competed in the women's 10 metre air rifle and women's 50 metre rifle three positions events at the 2012 Summer Olympics. Nardelli is an athlete of the Gruppo Sportivo della Marina Militare.
