= Nihan Kantarcı =

Turkish sport shooter (born 1982)

Personal information
- Nationality: Turkish
- Born: July 9, 1982 (age 43) Eskişehir, Turkey
- Education: Anadolu University
- Occupation: Teacher of physical education
- Years active: 1996-present
- Height: 159 cm (5 ft 3 in) (2011)
- Weight: 72 kg (159 lb) (2011)

Sport
- Country: Turkey
- Sport: Shotgun shooting
- Event(s): Trap, double trap
- Club: Bursa Büyükşehir Belediyespor
- Coached by: Diego Gasperini
Medal record
Women's Shooting
Representing Turkey
European Championships
Gold medal – first place	1999 Poussan	J Double trap
Silver medal – second place	2002 Lonato	J Trap
Bronze medal – third place	1999 Poussan	J Trap

Nihan Kantarcı (pronounced [ˈniːhan ˈkantaɾdʒɯ]; born July 9, 1982, in Eskişehir, Turkey) is a Turkish sport shooter who competes in the trap and double trap events. The 159 cm (5 ft 3 in) tall athlete at 72 kg (159 lb) is right handed.

She began with shooting sport in 1996 at the Eskişehir Hunting and Shooting Sports Club. She is coached by Diego Gasperini in Bursa Büyükşehir Belediyespor. She serves as a teacher of physical education in a primary school at Gemlik, Bursa Province following her graduation from the Anadolu University.

She obtained in the women's junior category a bronze medal in the trap, and a gold medal in the double trap event at the 1999 European Shooting Championships held in Poussan, France. In 2002, she became silver medalist in the junior trap event at the European Championships in Lonato, Italy.

Nihan Kantarcı qualified to participate in the trap event at the 2012 Summer Olympics with her 6th place achieved at the 2011 ISSF World Cup 1 held in Sydney, Australia. She was the first ever Turkish female Olympic sport shooter along with Çiğdem Özyaman, who competed in the skeet event.

== Achievements ==
Year	Competition	Venue	Position	Event	Notes
Representing Turkey
1999	ISSF World Championships	Tampere, Finland	6th	J Trap	
1999	ISSF World Championships	Tampere, Finland	4th	J Double trap	
1999	European Championships	Poussan, France	3rd	J Trap	
1999	European Championships	Poussan, France	1st	J Double trap	
2001	ISSF World Championships	Cairo, Egypt	7th	J Double trap	
2002	ISSF World Championships	Lahti, Finland	5th	J Trap	
2002	European Championships	Lonato, Italy	2nd	J Trap	
2011	ISSF World Cup 1	Sydney, Australia	6th	Trap	
2011	ISSF World Cup 2	Beijing, China	6th	Trap	
2011	ISSF World Cup	Concepción, Chile	4th	Trap	
