= Daniela Pešková =

Slovak sport shooter (born 1984)

Personal information
- Full name: Daniela Demjén Pešková
- Nationality: Slovak
- Born: 23 April 1984 (age 42) Vištuk, Czechoslovakia
- Height: 1.68 m (5 ft 6 in)
- Weight: 52 kg (115 lb)

Sport
- Country: Slovakia
- Sport: Sports shooting
- Event: Air rifle
- Club: Police Sports Centre
Medal record
shooting
Representing Slovakia
World Championships
Bronze medal – third place	2018 Changwon	50 m rifle prone
Summer Universiade
Silver medal – second place	2007 Bangkok	Rifle

Daniela Demjén Pešková (born 23 April 1984) is a Slovak sport shooter. She competed at the 2008 and 2012 Summer Olympics.
