= Michael Janker =

German sports shooter (born 1992)

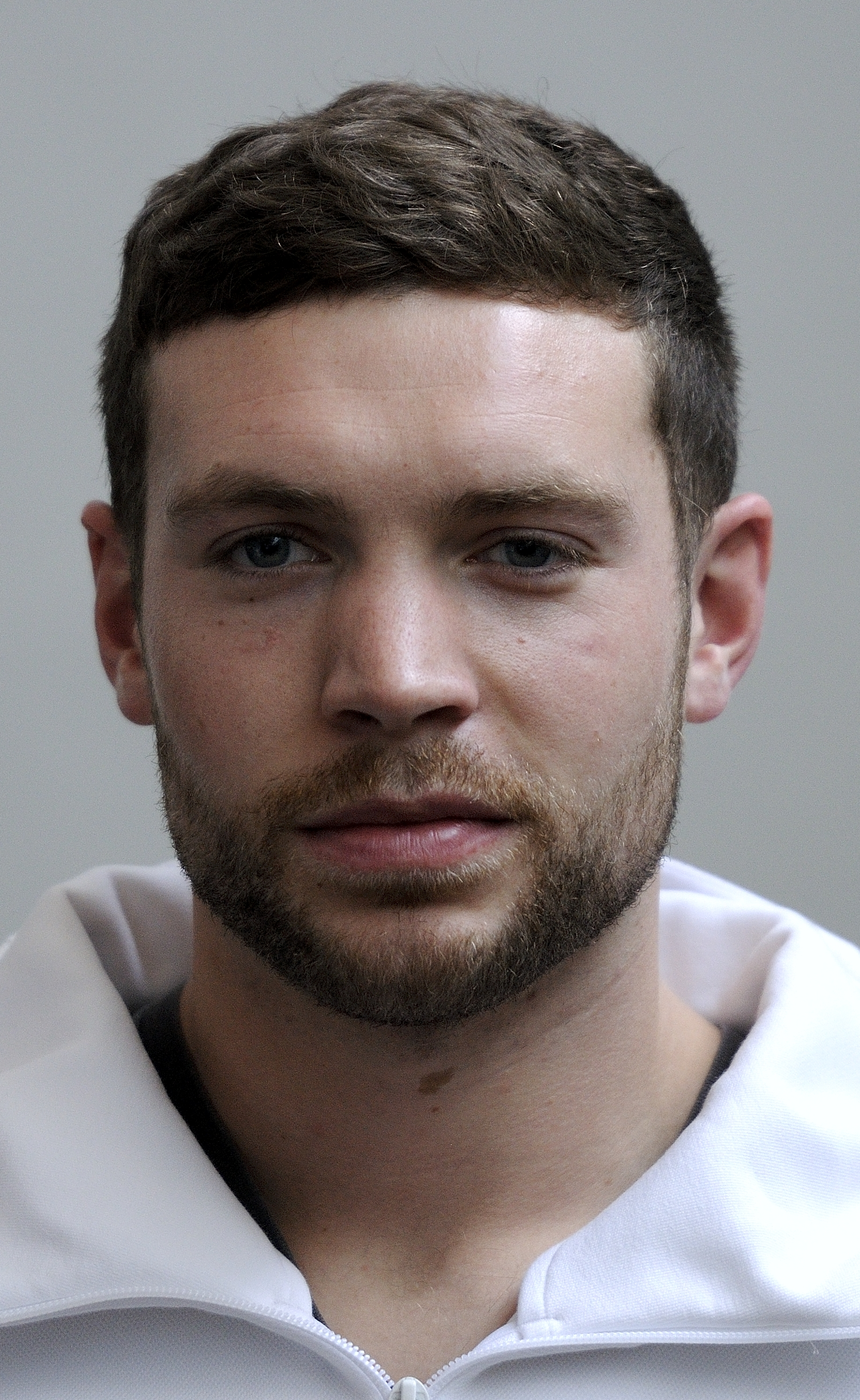
- Michael Janker in 2016

Personal information
- Nationality: German
- Born: 23 March 1992 (age 34) Dießen am Ammersee, Bavaria, Germany
- Height: 180 cm (5 ft 11 in)
- Weight: 75 kg (165 lb)

Sport
- Sport: Sports shooting

Michael Janker (born 23 March 1992) is a German sports shooter. He competed in the men's 10 metre air rifle event at the 2016 Summer Olympics where he finished in 29th place in the qualifications and did not advance.
