= Pascal Loretan =

Swiss sport shooter (born 1989)

Pascal Loretan (born 20 January 1989 in Leukerbad) is a Swiss sport shooter. He competed at the 2012 Summer Olympics in the Men's 10 metre air rifle and 50 m prone events. He finished 37th in the 10 metre and 31st in the 50 m prone.
