= Bojan Đurković =

Croatian sports shooter (born 1989)

Personal information
- Born: 17 October 1989 (age 36) Bjelovar, Croatia

Sport
- Sport: Sports shooting
Medal record
Representing Croatia
Men's Shooting
Mediterranean Games
| Bronze medal – third place | Mersin 2013 | 50 m rifle prone |

Bojan Đurković (born 17 October 1989) is a Croatian sports shooter. He competed in the Men's 10 metre air rifle, the men's 50 m prone rifle and men's 50 m three positions events at the 2012 Summer Olympics.
