= Simon Beyeler =

Swiss sport shooter (born 1982)

Simon Beyeler (born 11 June 1982 in Bern) is a Swiss sport shooter. At the 2008 Summer Olympics, he competed in the Men's 10 metre air rifle. In the 2012 Summer Olympics he competed in the Men's 10 metre air rifle and the Men's 50 metre rifle 3 positions.
