= Are Hansen =

Norwegian sport shooter (born 1982)

Are Hansen (born 16 January 1982) is a Norwegian sport shooter. He competed at the 2012 Summer Olympics in the Men's 10 metre air rifle and Men's 50 metre rifle 3 positions events. At the 2008 Summer Olympics, he competed in the Men's 10 metre air rifle event only.
