= Hrachik Babayan =

Armenian sports shooter (born 1996)

Personal information
- Born: 1 August 1996 (age 29) Yerevan, Armenia

Sport
- Sport: Sports shooting

Hrachik Babayan (born 1 August 1996) is an Armenian sports shooter. He competed in the men's 10 metre air rifle event at the 2016 Summer Olympics.
