= Marco De Nicolo =

Italian sport shooter (born 1976)

Personal information
- National team: Italy
- Born: 30 September 1976 (age 49) Legnano, Italy
- Height: 1.80 m (5 ft 11 in)
- Weight: 82 kg (181 lb)

Sport
- Sport: Sport shooting
- Event: Rifle
- Retired: 2021
Medal record
Men's shooting
Representing Italy
International competitions
Event	1st	2nd	3rd
World Championships	0	0	3
European Championships	5	2	1
European Games	0	1	0
World Cup	1	4	5
Mediterranean Games	2	2	2
Total	8	9	11
Mediterranean Games
Gold medal – first place	2009 Pescara	50 m rifle 3 positions
Gold medal – first place	2013 Mersin	50 m rifle 3 positions
Silver medal – second place	1997 Bari	10 m air pistol
Silver medal – second place	2013 Mersin	50 m rifle prone
Bronze medal – third place	2009 Pescara	50 m rifle prone
Bronze medal – third place	2005 Almeira	50 m rifle prone

Marco De Nicolo (born 30 September 1976) is a former Italian sport shooter.

== Career ==
De Nicolò competed at six editions of the Summer Games from 2000 Summer Olympics to 2020 Summer Olympics

He has competed in the men's 10 m air rifle, the 50 m rifle prone and the 50 m rifle 3 positions.

== See also ==
- Italian athletes with most appearances at Olympics
