= Thomas Mathis (sport shooter) =

Austrian sports shooter (born 1990)

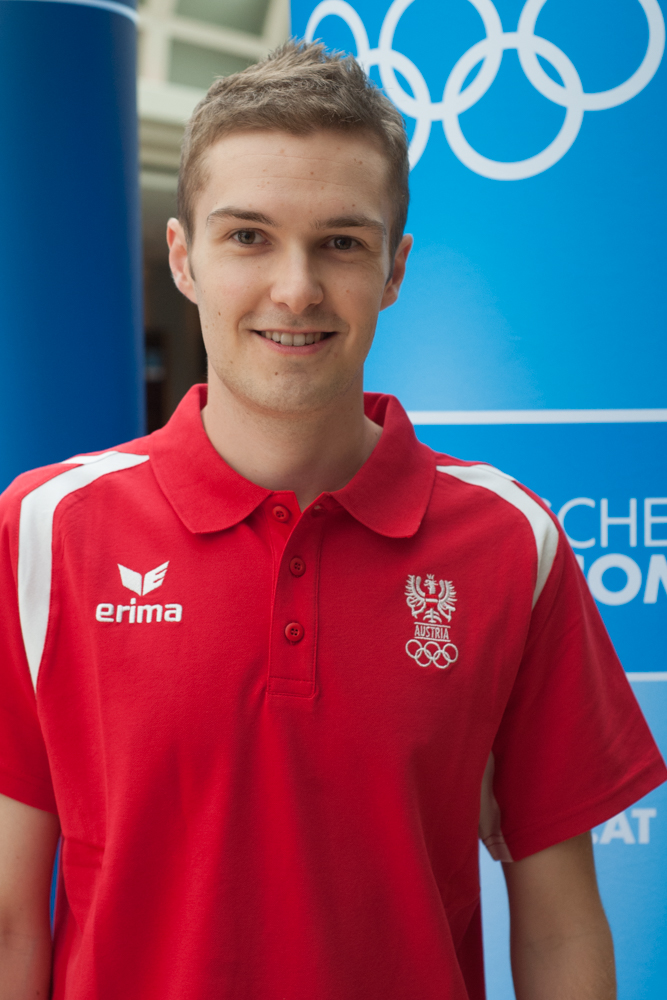
- Mathis in 2016

Personal information
- Nationality: Austrian
- Born: 25 April 1990 (age 36) Feldkirch, Austria
- Height: 1.78 m (5 ft 10 in)
- Weight: 65 kg (143 lb)

Sport
- Country: Austria
- Sport: Sports shooting
- Event: Air rifle
- Club: SG Hohenems
Medal record
World Championships
Bronze medal – third place	2018 Changwon	50 m rifle prone
European Championships
Gold medal – first place	2021 Osijek	50 m rifle 3 positions team
Gold medal – first place	2022 Wrocław	50 m rifle prone mixed team
Gold medal – first place	2026 Osijek	50 m rifle prone
Silver medal – second place	2015 Maribor	50 m rifle prone team
Silver medal – second place	2017 Baku	50 m rifle prone
Silver medal – second place	2017 Baku	50 m rifle prone team
Bronze medal – third place	2025 Osijek	10 m air rifle team

Thomas Mathis (born 25 April 1990) is an Austrian sports shooter. He competed in the men's 50-metre rifle prone event at the 2016 Summer Olympics.
