= Peter Hellenbrand =

Dutch sport shooter (born 1985)

Personal information
- Born: 7 December 1985 (age 39); Brunssum, Netherlands

Sport
- Country: Netherlands

Peter Hellenbrand (born 7 December 1985, Brunssum) is a Dutch sport shooter.

Hellenbrand competed at the 2012 Summer Olympics in the Men's 10 metre air rifle, which is his strongest area in the sport, where he finished fifth. He also competed in the men's 50 metre rifle prone and men's 50 metre rifle - 3 positions events, finishing in 43rd and 28th respectively.
