= Javier López (sport shooter) =

Spanish sports shooter

Personal information
- Born: 15 March 1989 (age 37) Murcia, Spain

Sport
- Sport: Sports shooting

Javier López (born 15 March 1989) is a Spanish sports shooter. He competed in the Men's 10 metre air rifle, men's 50 m rifle prone and men's 50 m rifle 3 positions events at the 2012 Summer Olympics.
