= Péter Sidi =

Hungarian sports shooter

Medal record

Men's shooting

Representing Hungary

World Championships
Gold medal – first place	2010 Munich	50 m rifle 3 pos
Silver medal – second place	2006 Zagreb	300 m rifle prone
Silver medal – second place	2010 Munich	10 m air rifle
Silver medal – second place	2025 Cairo	300 m rifle 3 positions
Bronze medal – third place	2002 Lahti	50 m rifle 3 pos
Bronze medal – third place	2006 Zagreb	50 m rifle prone team

European Championships
Gold medal – first place	2025 Châteauroux	300 m Rifle 3 Positions

Péter Sidi (born 11 September 1978 in Komárom) is a Hungarian sport shooter. He has been world champion in the 50 m rifle 3 positions, as well as winning silver medals in the 300 m rifle prone and the men's 10 metre air rifle. He has also won bronze medals in the 50 metre rifle 3 positions and the 50 m rifle prone team event. He currently holds the qualification world record in 10 m Air Rifle.

He has competed at five Olympic Games, 2000, 2004, 2008, 2012, and 2016, in the Men's 10 metre air rifle, Men's 50 metre rifle prone and Men's 50 metre rifle 3 positions. His best results are 5th at the men's 10 m air rifle in 2016 and 6th in the men's 50 metre rifle 3 positions.

On 21 June 2021 Peter Sidi was handed a two-year ban by the Hungarian federation, after being proven to have gained access to the hotel room of fellow sports shooter Istvan Peni, who produced a positive doping test later, during the ISSF World Cup event in India in March 2021.
