= Serhiy Kulish =

Ukrainian sport shooter (born 1993)

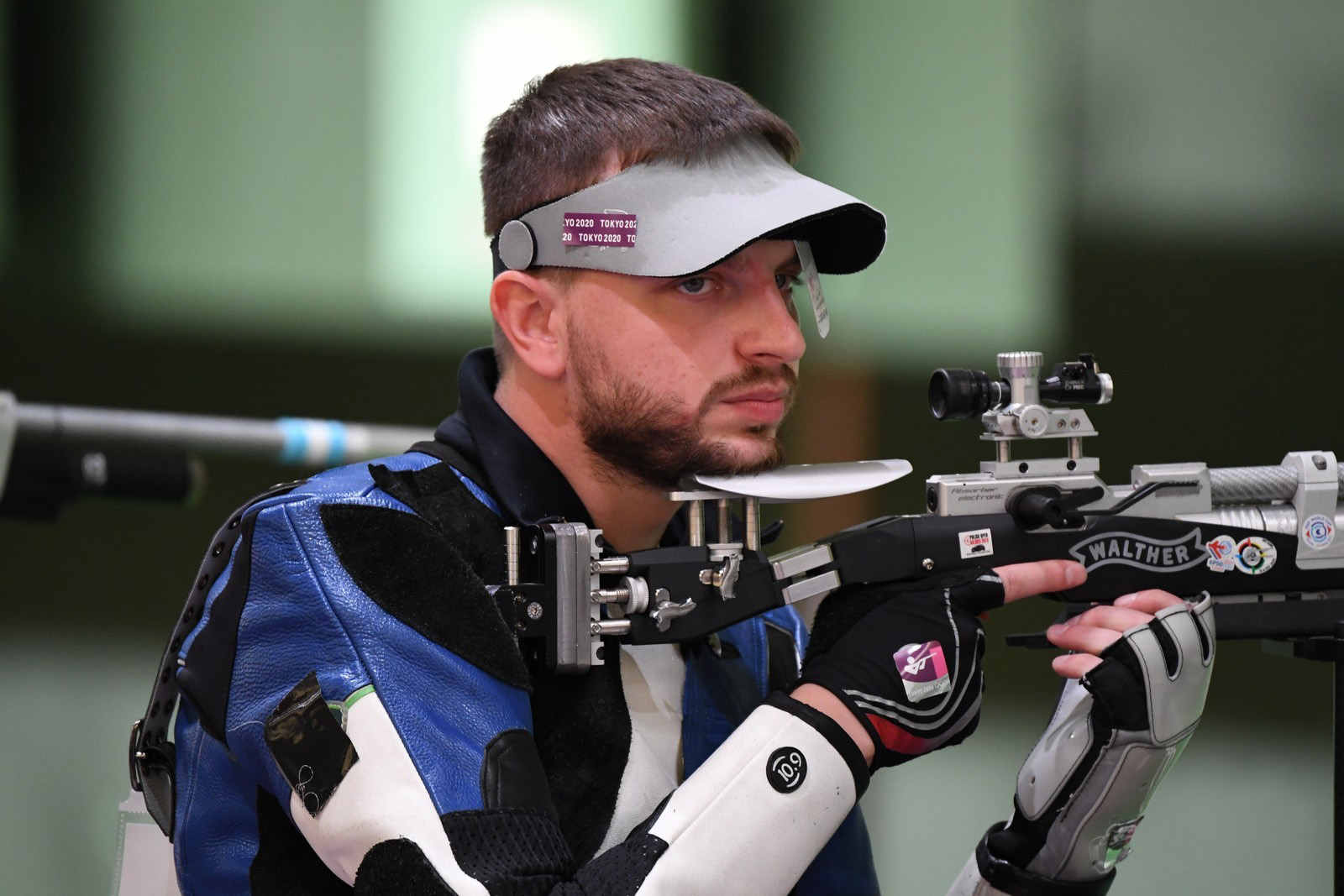
- Kulish at the 2020 Summer Olympics

Personal information
- Full name: Serhiy Volodymyrovych Kulish
- Nationality: Ukraine
- Born: 17 April 1993 (age 33) Cherkasy, Ukraine
- Height: 1.76 m (5 ft 9 in)
- Weight: 64 kg (141 lb)

Sport
- Country: Ukraine
- Sport: Shooting
Medal record
Men's shooting
Representing Ukraine
Olympic Games
Silver medal – second place	2016 Rio de Janeiro	10 m rifle
Silver medal – second place	2024 Paris	50 m rifle 3 positions
World Championships
Gold medal – first place	2022 Cairo	50 m rifle 3 positions
Silver medal – second place	2022 Cairo	50 m rifle prone mixed team
European Championships
Gold medal – first place	2024 Győr	10 m air rifle team
Gold medal – first place	2025 Osijek	10 m air rifle
Silver medal – second place	2017 Baku	50m rifle 3 positions
Bronze medal – third place	2026 Osijek	50m rifle 3 positions
Youth Olympic Games
Bronze medal – third place	2010 Singapore	10 m rifle

Serhiy Volodymyrovych Kulish (Ukrainian: Сергій Володимирович Куліш, born 17 April 1993) is a Ukrainian sport shooter. He won Silver medal in 2024 Summer Olympics in the men's 50 metres rifle three positions.

== Career ==
He competed at the 2012 Summer Olympics in the men's 10 metre air rifle. At the 2016 Summer Olympics in Rio, he won the silver medal in the men's 10m air rifle singles event. and in 2024 Paris Olympics, he got another sliver medal.

He is a native of Cherkasy. Multiple champion of Ukraine (2010-2013), master of sports of Ukraine of international class (2009). In 2022, he won the World Championship Rifle in Cairo.

== Performances at the Olympics ==
Olympics	Discipline	Place
London 2012	Rifle with three positions, 50 meters	14
London 2012	Rifle prone, 50 meters	49
London 2012	Air rifle, 10 meters	18
Rio 2016	Air rifle, 10 meters	2
Rio 2016	Rifle prone, 50 meters	32
Rio 2016	Rifle, 50 m, three positions	14
Tokyo 2020	Air rifle, 10 meters	29
Tokyo 2020	Rifle, 50 m, three positions	8
Paris 2024	Air rifle, 10 meters	27
Paris 2024	Rifle, 50 m, three positions	2
