= Anton Rizov =

Bulgarian sports shooter (born 1987)

Personal information
- Born: 29 December 1987 (age 38) Sandanski, Bulgaria

Sport
- Sport: Sports shooting
Medal record
European Championships
Gold medal – first place	2015 Arnhem	10 m rifle
Silver medal – second place	2022 Wrocław	50 m rifle prone
Bronze medal – third place	2011 Belgrade	50 m rifle 3 positions

Anton Rizov (Bulgarian: Антон Ризов, born 29 December 1987) is a Bulgarian sports shooter. He competed in the Men's 10 metre air rifle, men's 50 metre rifle 3 positions and men's 50 metre rifle prone events at the 2012 and 2016 Summer Olympics.
