= Shooting at the 2010 Asian Games =

- Venue: Aoti Shooting Range; Guangzhou Shotgun Centre
- Dates: 13–24 November 2010
- Competitors: 520 from 37 nations

Shooting at the 2010 Asian Games was held in Aoti Shooting Range in Guangzhou, China between 13 November and 24 November 2010.

== Schedule ==
●	1st day	●	Final day	Q	Qualification	F	Final

Event↓/Date →	13th Sat		14th Sun		15th Mon		16th Tue		17th Wed		18th Thu		19th Fri		20th Sat	21st Sun		22nd Mon	23rd Tue		24th Wed	
Men's 10 m air pistol			Q	F																		
Men's 10 m air pistol team			●																			
Men's 25 m center fire pistol											●											
Men's 25 m center fire pistol team											●											
Men's 25 m rapid fire pistol					Q	F																
Men's 25 m rapid fire pistol team					●																	
Men's 25 m standard pistol									●													
Men's 25 m standard pistol team									●													
Men's 50 m pistol	Q	F																				
Men's 50 m pistol team	●																					
Men's 10 m air rifle	Q	F																				
Men's 10 m air rifle team	●																					
Men's 50 m rifle prone					Q	F																
Men's 50 m rifle prone team					●																	
Men's 50 m rifle 3 positions											Q	F										
Men's 50 m rifle 3 positions team											●											
Men's 10 m running target							●															
Men's 10 m running target team							●															
Men's 10 m running target mixed									●													
Men's 10 m running target mixed team									●													
Men's trap											Q		Q	F								
Men's trap team											●		●									
Men's double trap																Q	F					
Men's double trap team																●						
Men's skeet																			Q		Q	F
Men's skeet team																			●		●	
Women's 10 m air pistol			Q	F																		
Women's 10 m air pistol team			●																			
Women's 25 m pistol							Q	F														
Women's 25 m pistol team							●															
Women's 10 m air rifle	Q	F																				
Women's 10 m air rifle team	●																					
Women's 50 m rifle prone					●																	
Women's 50 m rifle prone team					●																	
Women's 50 m rifle 3 positions									Q	F												
Women's 50 m rifle 3 positions team									●													
Women's 10 m running target					●																	
Women's 10 m running target team					●																	
Women's trap													Q	F								
Women's trap team													●									
Women's double trap																●						
Women's double trap team																●						
Women's skeet																			Q	F		
Women's skeet team																			●			

== Medalists ==
=== Men ===
Event	Gold	Silver	Bronze
10 m air pistol	Lee Dae-myung; South Korea	Tan Zongliang; China	Vijay Kumar; India
10 m air pistol team	South Korea; Jin Jong-oh; Lee Dae-myung; Lee Sang-do	China; Pang Wei; Pu Qifeng; Tan Zongliang	Japan; Kojiro Horimizu; Susumu Kobayashi; Tomoyuki Matsuda
25 m center fire pistol	Park Byung-taek; South Korea	Liu Yadong; China	Vijay Kumar; India
25 m center fire pistol team	China; Jin Yongde; Li Chuanlin; Liu Yadong	South Korea; Hong Seong-hwan; Jang Dae-kyu; Park Byung-taek	North Korea; Kim Chol-rim; Kim Jong-su; Ryu Myong-yon
25 m rapid fire pistol	Li Yuehong; China	Hà Minh Thành; Vietnam	Zhang Jian; China
25 m rapid fire pistol team	China; Ding Feng; Li Yuehong; Zhang Jian	South Korea; Cha Sang-jun; Hong Seong-hwan; Hwang Yoon-sam	Vietnam; Bùi Quang Nam; Hà Minh Thành; Phạm Anh Đạt
25 m standard pistol	Hong Seong-hwan; South Korea	Kim Jong-su; North Korea	Jin Yongde; China
25 m standard pistol team	South Korea; Hong Seong-hwan; Hwang Yoon-sam; Jang Dae-kyu	China; Jin Yongde; Li Chuanlin; Liu Yadong	North Korea; Kim Chol-rim; Kim Jong-su; Ryu Myong-yon
50 m pistol	Pu Qifeng; China	Jin Jong-oh; South Korea	Tomoyuki Matsuda; Japan
50 m pistol team	South Korea; Jin Jong-oh; Lee Dae-myung; Lee Sang-do	China; Pang Wei; Pu Qifeng; Wu Jing	Japan; Kojiro Horimizu; Susumu Kobayashi; Tomoyuki Matsuda
10 m air rifle	Zhu Qinan; China	Gagan Narang; India	Kim Ki-won; South Korea
10 m air rifle team	China; Cao Yifei; Yu Jikang; Zhu Qinan	India; Abhinav Bindra; Gagan Narang; Sanjeev Rajput	South Korea; Choi Sung-soon; Kim Jong-hyun; Kim Ki-won
50 m rifle prone	Kim Hak-man; South Korea	Yuriy Melsitov; Kazakhstan	Tian Hui; China
50 m rifle prone team	South Korea; Han Jin-seop; Kim Hak-man; Kim Jong-hyun	China; Tian Hui; Tian Pu; Wang Weiyi	Kazakhstan; Yuriy Melsitov; Igor Pirekeyev; Alexandr Yermakov
50 m rifle 3 positions	Han Jin-seop; South Korea	Kim Jong-hyun; South Korea	Zhu Qinan; China
50 m rifle 3 positions team	South Korea; Han Jin-seop; Kim Jong-hyun; Lee Hyun-tae	Kazakhstan; Vitaliy Dovgun; Igor Pirekeyev; Yuriy Yurkov	China; Cao Yifei; Li Bo; Zhu Qinan
10 m running target	Zhai Yujia; China	Jo Yong-chol; North Korea	Jeong You-jin; South Korea
10 m running target team	China; Gan Lin; Yang Ling; Zhai Yujia	North Korea; Jo Yong-chol; Kim Ji-song; Pak Myong-won	Kazakhstan; Andrey Gurov; Bakhtiyar Ibrayev; Rassim Mologly
10 m running target mixed	Pak Myong-won; North Korea	Zhai Yujia; China	Gan Lin; China
10 m running target mixed team	North Korea; Jo Yong-chol; Kim Ji-song; Pak Myong-won	China; Gan Lin; Yang Ling; Zhai Yujia	South Korea; Cho Se-jong; Hwang Young-do; Jeong You-jin
Trap	Naser Al-Meqlad; Athletes from Kuwait	Khaled Al-Mudhaf; Athletes from Kuwait	Joe Salem; Lebanon
Trap team	Athletes from Kuwait; Abdulrahman Al-Faihan; Naser Al-Meqlad; Khaled Al-Mudhaf	Lebanon; Abdo Al-Yazgie; Joseph Hanna; Joe Salem	India; Manavjit Singh Sandhu; Zoravar Singh Sandhu; Mansher Singh
Double trap	Ronjan Sodhi; India	Juma Al-Maktoum; United Arab Emirates	Hamad Al-Marri; Qatar
Double trap team	China; Hu Binyuan; Mo Junjie; Pan Qiang	Athletes from Kuwait; Hamad Al-Afasi; Fehaid Al-Deehani; Mashfi Al-Mutairi	India; Vikram Bhatnagar; Asher Noria; Ronjan Sodhi
Skeet	Abdullah Al-Rashidi; Athletes from Kuwait	Masoud Saleh Al-Athba; Qatar	Nasser Al-Attiyah; Qatar
Skeet team	Qatar; Masoud Saleh Al-Athba; Abdulaziz Al-Attiyah; Nasser Al-Attiyah	Athletes from Kuwait; Salah Al-Mutairi; Zaid Al-Mutairi; Abdullah Al-Rashidi	China; Jin Di; Qu Ridong; Tang Shuai

=== Women ===
Event	Gold	Silver	Bronze
10 m air pistol	Kim Yun-mi; South Korea	Sun Qi; China	Jo Yong-suk; North Korea
10 m air pistol team	South Korea; Kim Byung-hee; Kim Yun-mi; Lee Ho-lim	India; Sonia Rai; Heena Sidhu; Annu Raj Singh	China; Guo Wenjun; Su Yuling; Sun Qi
25 m pistol	Jo Yong-suk; North Korea	Yukari Mori; Japan	Lee Ho-lim; South Korea
25 m pistol team	Kazakhstan; Zauresh Baibussinova; Galina Belyayeva; Yuliya Drishlyuk	Mongolia; Tömörchödöriin Bayartsetseg; Otryadyn Gündegmaa; Tsogbadrakhyn Mönkhzul	South Korea; Kim Byung-hee; Lee Ho-lim; Park Hye-soo
10 m air rifle	Yi Siling; China	Wu Liuxi; China	Nur Suryani Taibi; Malaysia
10 m air rifle team	China; Wu Liuxi; Yi Siling; Yu Dan	Iran; Elaheh Ahmadi; Narjes Emamgholinejad; Mahlagha Jambozorg	Uzbekistan; Yana Fatkhi; Elena Kuznetsova; Sakina Mamedova
50 m rifle prone	Wang Chengyi; China	Olga Dovgun; Kazakhstan	Seiko Iwata; Japan
50 m rifle prone team	South Korea; Kim Jung-mi; Kwon Na-ra; Lee Yun-chae	Thailand; Vitchuda Pichitkanjanakul; Ratchadaporn Plengsaengthong; Supamas Wankaew	China; Hou Xiaoyu; Huang Na; Wang Chengyi
50 m rifle 3 positions	Wang Chengyi; China	Elaheh Ahmadi; Iran	Wu Liuxi; China
50 m rifle 3 positions team	China; Wang Chengyi; Wu Liuxi; Yi Siling	South Korea; Kwon Na-ra; Lee Yun-chae; Na Yoon-kyung	Iran; Elaheh Ahmadi; Mahlagha Jambozorg; Maryam Talebi
10 m running target	Li Xueyan; China	Su Li; China	Ri Hyang-sim; North Korea
10 m running target team	China; Li Xueyan; Su Li; Yang Zeng	Vietnam; Cù Thị Thanh Tú; Đặng Hồng Hà; Nguyễn Thị Thu Hằng	North Korea; Jo Hyang; Pak Hyon-a; Ri Hyang-sim
Trap	Yukie Nakayama; Japan	Gao E China	Liu Yingzi; China
Trap team	China; Gao E Liu Yingzi; Tian Xia	North Korea; Chae Hye-gyong; Pak Yong-hui; Yang Sol-i	South Korea; Eom So-yeon; Kang Gee-eun; Lee Bo-na
Double trap	Li Qingnian; China	Li Rui; China	Janejira Srisongkram; Thailand
Double trap team	China; Li Qingnian; Li Rui; Zhang Yafei	South Korea; Kang Gee-eun; Kim Mi-jin; Lee Bo-na	Thailand; Punnapa Asvanit; Chattaya Kitcharoen; Janejira Srisongkram
Skeet	Wei Ning; China	Kim Min-ji; South Korea	Sutiya Jiewchaloemmit; Thailand
Skeet team	China; Wei Meng; Wei Ning; Zhang Shan	South Korea; Kim Ae-kyun; Kim Min-ji; Kwak Yu-hyun	Thailand; Isarapa Imprasertsuk; Sutiya Jiewchaloemmit; Nutchaya Sutarporn

== Medal table ==
Rank	Nation	Gold	Silver	Bronze	Total
1	China (CHN)	21	13	11	45
2	South Korea (KOR)	13	8	7	28
3	North Korea (PRK)	3	4	5	12
4	Athletes from Kuwait (IOC)	3	3	0	6
5	India (IND)	1	3	4	8
6	Kazakhstan (KAZ)	1	3	2	6
7	Japan (JPN)	1	1	4	6
8	Qatar (QAT)	1	1	2	4
9	Iran (IRI)	0	2	1	3
9	Vietnam (VIE)	0	2	1	3
11	Thailand (THA)	0	1	4	5
12	Lebanon (LIB)	0	1	1	2
13	Mongolia (MGL)	0	1	0	1
13	United Arab Emirates (UAE)	0	1	0	1
15	Malaysia (MAS)	0	0	1	1
15	Uzbekistan (UZB)	0	0	1	1
Totals (16 entries)		44	44	44	132

== Participating nations ==
A total of 520 athletes from 37 nations competed in shooting at the 2010 Asian Games:

- Afghanistan (1)
- Athletes from Kuwait (13)
- Bahrain (6)
- Bangladesh (13)
- China (51)
- Chinese Taipei (13)
- Hong Kong (4)
- India (40)
- Indonesia (3)
- Iran (24)
- Japan (14)
- Kazakhstan (31)
- Kyrgyzstan (6)
- Laos (3)
- Lebanon (6)
- Macau (8)
- Malaysia (17)
- Maldives (2)
- Mongolia (16)
- Myanmar (3)
- Nepal (4)
- North Korea (19)
- Oman (3)
- Pakistan (12)
- Philippines (8)
- Qatar (31)
- Saudi Arabia (16)
- Singapore (22)
- South Korea (43)
- Sri Lanka (4)
- Syria (2)
- Tajikistan (4)
- Thailand (38)
- Turkmenistan (2)
- United Arab Emirates (11)
- Uzbekistan (3)
- Vietnam (24)
