= Shooting at the 2010 Asian Games – Women's 10 metre air pistol =

Air pistol competition

Women's 10 metre air pistol at the 2010 Asian Games
- Venue: Aoti Shooting Range
- Dates: 14 November 2010
- Competitors: 52 from 22 nations

Medalists
gold medal	Kim Yun-mi	South Korea
silver medal	Sun Qi	China
bronze medal	Jo Yong-suk	North Korea

The women's 10 metre air pistol competition at the 2010 Asian Games in Guangzhou, China was held on 14 November at the Aoti Shooting Range.

== Schedule ==
All times are China Standard Time (UTC+08:00)

Date	Time	Event
Sunday, 14 November 2010	11:45	Qualification
Sunday, 14 November 2010	14:00	Final

== Records ==
Prior to this competition, the existing world, Asian and Games records were as follows.

Qualification
World Record	Svetlana Smirnova (RUS)	393	Munich, Germany	23 May 1998
Asian Record	Guo Wenjun (CHN)	392	Milan, Italy	24 May 2009
Games Record	Tao Luna (CHN)	391	Doha, Qatar	3 December 2006
Final
World Record	Ren Jie (CHN)	493.5	Munich, Germany	22 May 1999
Asian Record	Ren Jie (CHN)	493.5	Munich, Germany	22 May 1999
Games Record	Tao Luna (CHN)	490.3	Doha, Qatar	3 December 2006

== Results ==
=== Qualification ===
Rank	Athlete	Series				Total	Xs	S-off	Notes
Rank	Athlete	1	2	3	4	Total	Xs	S-off	Notes
1	Sun Qi (CHN)	98	94	96	97	385	10		
2	Kim Yun-mi (KOR)	96	97	92	98	383	15		
3	Zauresh Baibussinova (KAZ)	93	96	96	97	382	17		
4	Tanyaporn Prucksakorn (THA)	97	94	95	96	382	13		
5	Kanokkan Chaimongkol (THA)	94	95	98	95	382	13		
6	Guo Wenjun (CHN)	93	96	98	95	382	10		
7	Jo Yong-suk (PRK)	95	93	96	98	382	6		
8	Galina Belyayeva (KAZ)	96	96	94	95	381	11	50.7	
9	Heena Sidhu (IND)	94	98	93	96	381	9	49.6	
10	Otryadyn Gündegmaa (MGL)	97	97	96	91	381	7	47.4	
11	Annu Raj Singh (IND)	91	95	97	97	380	10		
12	Kim Hyang-gum (PRK)	93	97	96	93	379	11		
13	Kim Byung-hee (KOR)	94	97	94	94	379	8		
14	Lee Ho-lim (KOR)	95	94	97	93	379	7		
15	Kinuko Sato (JPN)	95	96	92	96	379	5		
16	Sonia Rai (IND)	95	95	95	94	379	4		
17	Nguyễn Thu Vân (VIE)	92	94	95	97	378	6		
18	Hung Pi Lien (MAC)	95	98	92	92	377	12		
19	Ri Hyang-sun (PRK)	96	92	93	96	377	11		
20	Fatemeh Hosseini (IRI)	98	93	92	94	377	11		
21	Yu Ai-wen (TPE)	92	94	96	95	377	7		
22	Tien Chia-chen (TPE)	93	95	94	95	377	7		
23	Tsai Chia-hui (TPE)	93	95	94	94	376	6		
24	Meshall Munir (PAK)	92	93	96	94	375	8		
25	Joseline Cheah (MAS)	94	91	94	96	375	7		
26	Yuliya Drishlyuk (KAZ)	95	95	94	90	374	13		
27	Wanwarin Yusawat (THA)	95	90	94	95	374	9		
28	Bakhtigul Makhmadova (KGZ)	96	93	93	92	374	6		
29	Bibiana Ng (MAS)	93	95	95	90	373	5		
30	Su Yuling (CHN)	94	94	91	93	372	8		
31	Yukari Mori (JPN)	95	91	92	94	372	7		
32	Yoko Inada (JPN)	94	92	95	91	372	7		
33	Zeinab Ramezani (IRI)	92	92	94	92	370	10		
34	Tsogbadrakhyn Mönkhzul (MGL)	92	93	91	94	370	6		
35	Sumaya Al-Meshaiei (UAE)	88	92	95	94	369	7		
36	Armin Asha (BAN)	95	91	92	91	369	4		
37	Souad Al-Khater (QAT)	96	88	92	92	368	5		
38	Elham Harijani (IRI)	91	95	93	88	367	10		
39	Đặng Lê Ngọc Mai (VIE)	91	89	94	93	367	7		
40	Rabeaa Abou Shahda (SYR)	94	92	94	87	367	4		
41	Tazeem Abbasi (PAK)	92	92	92	90	366	4		
42	Li Mei Wun (HKG)	86	94	95	90	365	8		
43	Ýelena Týunkina (TKM)	86	92	94	92	364	6		
44	Alyanna Chuatoco (PHI)	90	90	91	93	364	5		
45	Tsagaandalaigiin Khongorzul (MGL)	88	92	91	93	364	2		
46	Nasra Mohammed (QAT)	91	90	93	88	362	6		
47	Pun Ka Man (MAC)	86	92	89	95	362	2		
48	Phạm Thị Hà (VIE)	88	87	91	95	361	4		
49	Shaikha Al-Rumaithi (UAE)	92	84	91	93	360	5		
50	Hanadi Salem (QAT)	89	88	86	93	356	3		
51	Farhana Kawsar Rony (BAN)	89	90	91	86	356	3		
52	Shamma Al-Muhairi (UAE)	90	89	85	91	355	5		

=== Final ===
Rank	Athlete	Qual.	Final											Total	S-off	Notes
Rank	Athlete	Qual.	1	2	3	4	5	6	7	8	9	10	Total	Total	S-off	Notes
1st place, gold medalist(s)	Kim Yun-mi (KOR)	383	10.6	10.4	9.5	10.1	10.0	9.7	10.3	10.5	10.2	9.0	100.3	483.3		
2nd place, silver medalist(s)	Sun Qi (CHN)	385	10.2	9.3	9.3	10.1	10.0	9.7	9.7	9.8	9.6	9.0	96.7	481.7		
3rd place, bronze medalist(s)	Jo Yong-suk (PRK)	382	10.3	9.3	8.7	10.1	9.9	10.6	10.5	9.6	10.1	9.1	98.2	480.2		
4	Guo Wenjun (CHN)	382	9.6	9.4	9.6	10.3	9.9	9.4	9.5	10.6	9.8	9.1	97.2	479.2		
5	Zauresh Baibussinova (KAZ)	382	9.0	9.8	9.4	9.9	10.6	9.7	9.8	10.5	9.2	8.3	96.2	478.2		
6	Tanyaporn Prucksakorn (THA)	382	9.7	9.2	8.0	9.8	9.6	10.1	9.6	9.5	10.2	10.1	95.8	477.8		
7	Kanokkan Chaimongkol (THA)	382	8.6	9.0	9.6	8.8	10.0	8.8	10.0	9.5	10.3	9.6	94.2	476.2		
8	Galina Belyayeva (KAZ)	381	10.0	9.2	10.4	9.5	9.1	8.8	9.5	9.5	9.4	8.4	93.8	474.8		
