= Shooting at the 2010 Asian Games – Women's 25 metre pistol =

Women's 25 metre pistol at the 2010 Asian Games
- Venue: Aoti Shooting Range
- Dates: 16 November 2010
- Competitors: 44 from 18 nations

Medalists
gold medal	Jo Yong-suk	North Korea
silver medal	Yukari Mori	Japan
bronze medal	Lee Ho-lim	South Korea

The women's 25 metre pistol competition at the 2010 Asian Games in Guangzhou, China was held on 16 November at the Aoti Shooting Range.

== Schedule ==
All times are China Standard Time (UTC+08:00)

Date	Time	Event
Tuesday, 16 November 2010	09:00	Qualification
Tuesday, 16 November 2010	16:00	Final

== Records ==
Prior to this competition, the existing world, Asian and Games records were as follows.

Qualification
World Record	Diana Iorgova (BUL)	594	Milan, Italy	31 May 1994
Asian Record	Tao Luna (CHN)	594	Munich, Germany	23 August 2002
Games Record	Chen Ying (CHN)	592	Busan, South Korea	4 October 2002
Final
World Record	Maria Grozdeva (BUL)	796.7	Changwon, South Korea	11 April 2005
Asian Record	Otryadyn Gündegmaa (MGL)	796.5	Changwon, South Korea	11 April 2005
Games Record	Chen Ying (CHN)	792.2	Doha, Qatar	5 December 2006

== Results ==
=== Qualification ===
Rank	Athlete	Precision			Rapid			Total	Xs	S-off	Notes
Rank	Athlete	1	2	3	1	2	3	Total	Xs	S-off	Notes
1	Yukari Mori (JPN)	97	97	99	97	99	98	587	25		
2	Jo Yong-suk (PRK)	96	98	97	98	97	99	585	18		
3	Yuliya Drishlyuk (KAZ)	98	98	93	99	97	96	581	13		
4	Su Yuling (CHN)	93	98	96	99	97	97	580	21		
5	Phạm Thị Hà (VIE)	95	97	98	95	98	97	580	18		
6	Lee Ho-lim (KOR)	94	97	96	98	97	98	580	17		
7	Tanyaporn Prucksakorn (THA)	95	97	97	97	95	98	579	14		
8	Otryadyn Gündegmaa (MGL)	97	94	96	96	97	98	578	18		
9	Park Hye-soo (KOR)	95	95	96	97	96	98	577	16		
10	Rahi Sarnobat (IND)	96	94	96	96	96	99	577	13		
11	Bibiana Ng (MAS)	98	97	92	98	94	97	576	16		
12	Nguyễn Thu Vân (VIE)	93	94	98	97	98	96	576	15		
13	Galina Belyayeva (KAZ)	96	95	98	93	96	98	576	9		
14	Tsogbadrakhyn Mönkhzul (MGL)	94	95	95	96	96	98	574	16		
15	Naphaswan Yangpaiboon (THA)	97	94	97	93	96	97	574	15		
16	Ri Hyang-sun (PRK)	96	96	96	96	93	97	574	14		
17	Zauresh Baibussinova (KAZ)	95	98	93	97	94	97	574	13		
18	Annu Raj Singh (IND)	97	95	96	95	96	95	574	13		
19	Tömörchödöriin Bayartsetseg (MGL)	98	97	92	97	98	91	573	16		
20	Fatemeh Hosseini (IRI)	97	93	94	96	97	95	572	13		
21	Zeinab Ramezani (IRI)	91	96	96	96	97	96	572	11		
22	Yoko Inada (JPN)	98	97	95	93	93	95	571	17		
23	Sumaya Al-Meshaiei (UAE)	94	93	95	95	96	97	570	10		
24	Tien Chia-chen (TPE)	95	94	97	95	92	96	569	15		
25	Guo Wenjun (CHN)	91	96	96	95	94	96	568	15		
26	Anisa Sayyed (IND)	97	92	93	95	93	96	566	16		
27	Kim Byung-hee (KOR)	95	92	95	95	97	92	566	13		
28	Lu Miaoyi (CHN)	97	92	97	92	95	92	565	14		
29	Elham Harijani (IRI)	96	97	93	94	94	90	564	14		
30	Kinuko Sato (JPN)	97	95	95	94	86	96	563	19		
31	Đặng Lê Ngọc Mai (VIE)	95	92	92	95	94	95	563	11		
32	Joseline Cheah (MAS)	98	93	99	90	91	90	561	15		
33	Tazeem Abbasi (PAK)	93	97	93	91	91	94	559	4		
34	Kim Hyang-gum (PRK)	95	95	94	85	97	92	558	15		
35	Shaikha Al-Rumaithi (UAE)	95	93	92	88	88	94	550	10		
36	Souad Al-Khater (QAT)	92	93	92	89	92	92	550	5		
37	Kanokkan Chaimongkol (THA)	96	93	96	90	82	88	545	11		
38	Hanadi Salem (QAT)	93	92	91	89	83	96	544	11		
39	Asma Hawwa (MDV)	90	85	93	90	92	91	541	7		
40	Nasra Mohammed (QAT)	89	89	80	95	93	94	540	5		
41	Shamma Al-Muhairi (UAE)	92	93	92	83	83	91	534	8		
42	Meshall Munir (PAK)	93	87	94	85	79	73	511	6		
43	Alyanna Chuatoco (PHI)	84	76	90	76	87	83	496	7		
44	Ýelena Týunkina (TKM)	85	95	91	80	63	79	493	11		

=== Final ===
Rank	Athlete	Qual.	Final											Total	S-off	Notes
Rank	Athlete	Qual.	1	2	3	4	5	6	7	8	9	10	Total	Total	S-off	Notes
1st place, gold medalist(s)	Jo Yong-suk (PRK)	585	10.3	10.1	10.2	9.7	9.8	10.4	10.4	10.2	9.7	10.1	200.9	785.9		
1st place, gold medalist(s)	Jo Yong-suk (PRK)	585	9.6	10.1	10.1	9.6	10.4	9.4	10.6	9.1	10.8	10.3	200.9	785.9		
2nd place, silver medalist(s)	Yukari Mori (JPN)	587	9.8	10.2	9.6	9.9	9.8	9.0	10.1	9.3	10.7	10.1	197.8	784.8		
2nd place, silver medalist(s)	Yukari Mori (JPN)	587	9.9	10.6	10.8	9.9	9.3	10.5	9.3	9.1	9.9	10.0	197.8	784.8		
3rd place, bronze medalist(s)	Lee Ho-lim (KOR)	580	10.4	10.3	9.9	9.4	9.8	10.8	9.0	9.4	10.0	10.7	202.4	782.4		
3rd place, bronze medalist(s)	Lee Ho-lim (KOR)	580	10.3	10.6	10.3	10.6	9.6	10.0	10.7	10.6	10.0	10.0	202.4	782.4		
4	Phạm Thị Hà (VIE)	580	9.9	9.2	10.7	10.4	10.3	10.1	10.1	9.6	10.4	10.0	202.0	782.0	50.8	
4	Phạm Thị Hà (VIE)	580	10.6	9.9	10.3	8.7	10.5	10.3	10.5	10.1	10.1	10.3	202.0	782.0	50.8	
5	Otryadyn Gündegmaa (MGL)	578	9.8	10.7	10.4	10.2	10.5	10.1	10.4	10.0	10.6	10.6	204.0	782.0	49.7	
5	Otryadyn Gündegmaa (MGL)	578	10.3	10.8	10.8	9.9	9.8	9.2	10.3	9.4	10.2	10.0	204.0	782.0	49.7	
6	Su Yuling (CHN)	580	8.8	10.7	10.2	9.7	10.4	9.5	10.5	9.8	10.7	10.4	200.1	780.1		
6	Su Yuling (CHN)	580	9.7	10.5	9.8	9.7	9.7	10.4	10.1	10.0	10.3	9.2	200.1	780.1		
7	Yuliya Drishlyuk (KAZ)	581	9.2	9.8	9.3	10.1	9.7	10.1	9.4	10.4	10.0	10.6	195.4	776.4		
7	Yuliya Drishlyuk (KAZ)	581	9.0	10.2	9.7	10.7	10.0	10.0	9.8	9.3	8.1	10.0	195.4	776.4		
8	Tanyaporn Prucksakorn (THA)	579	8.9	10.0	10.2	10.4	7.2	9.8	9.5	9.2	8.9	9.8	190.6	769.6		
8	Tanyaporn Prucksakorn (THA)	579	9.4	10.7	9.6	10.3	10.9	8.3	8.8	9.8	9.8	9.1	190.6	769.6		
