= Shooting at the 2010 Asian Games – Women's 10 metre air pistol team =

Women's 10 metre air pistol team at the 2010 Asian Games
- Venue: Aoti Shooting Range
- Dates: 14 November 2010
- Competitors: 39 from 13 nations

Medalists
gold medal	South Korea; Kim Byung-hee, Kim Yun-mi, Lee Ho-lim
silver medal	India; Sonia Rai, Heena Sidhu, Annu Raj Singh
bronze medal	China; Guo Wenjun, Su Yuling, Sun Qi

The women's 10 metre air pistol team competition at the 2010 Asian Games in Guangzhou, China was held on 14 November at the Aoti Shooting Range.

== Schedule ==
All times are China Standard Time (UTC+08:00)

Date	Time	Event
Sunday, 14 November 2010	11:45	Final

== Records ==
Prior to this competition, the existing world, Asian and Games records were as follows.

World Record	Russia	1161	Brno, Czech Republic	5 August 1993
Asian Record	China	1161	Doha, Qatar	3 December 2006
Games Record	China	1161	Doha, Qatar	3 December 2006

== Results ==
Rank	Team	Series				Total	Xs	Notes
Rank	Team	1	2	3	4	Total	Xs	Notes
1st place, gold medalist(s)	South Korea (KOR)	285	288	283	285	1141	30	
	Kim Byung-hee	94	97	94	94	379	8	
	Kim Yun-mi	96	97	92	98	383	15	
	Lee Ho-lim	95	94	97	93	379	7	
2nd place, silver medalist(s)	India (IND)	280	288	285	287	1140	23	
	Sonia Rai	95	95	95	94	379	4	
	Heena Sidhu	94	98	93	96	381	9	
	Annu Raj Singh	91	95	97	97	380	10	
3rd place, bronze medalist(s)	China (CHN)	285	284	285	285	1139	28	
	Guo Wenjun	93	96	98	95	382	10	
	Su Yuling	94	94	91	93	372	8	
	Sun Qi	98	94	96	97	385	10	
4	Thailand (THA)	286	279	287	286	1138	35	
	Kanokkan Chaimongkol	94	95	98	95	382	13	
	Tanyaporn Prucksakorn	97	94	95	96	382	13	
	Wanwarin Yusawat	95	90	94	95	374	9	
5	North Korea (PRK)	284	282	285	287	1138	28	
	Jo Yong-suk	95	93	96	98	382	6	
	Kim Hyang-gum	93	97	96	93	379	11	
	Ri Hyang-sun	96	92	93	96	377	11	
6	Kazakhstan (KAZ)	284	287	284	282	1137	41	
	Zauresh Baibussinova	93	96	96	97	382	17	
	Galina Belyayeva	96	96	94	95	381	11	
	Yuliya Drishlyuk	95	95	94	90	374	13	
7	Chinese Taipei (TPE)	278	284	284	284	1130	20	
	Tien Chia-chen	93	95	94	95	377	7	
	Tsai Chia-hui	93	95	94	94	376	6	
	Yu Ai-wen	92	94	96	95	377	7	
8	Japan (JPN)	284	279	279	281	1123	19	
	Yoko Inada	94	92	95	91	372	7	
	Yukari Mori	95	91	92	94	372	7	
	Kinuko Sato	95	96	92	96	379	5	
9	Mongolia (MGL)	277	282	278	278	1115	15	
	Otryadyn Gündegmaa	97	97	96	91	381	7	
	Tsagaandalaigiin Khongorzul	88	92	91	93	364	2	
	Tsogbadrakhyn Mönkhzul	92	93	91	94	370	6	
10	Iran (IRI)	281	280	279	274	1114	31	
	Elham Harijani	91	95	93	88	367	10	
	Fatemeh Hosseini	98	93	92	94	377	11	
	Zeinab Ramezani	92	92	94	92	370	10	
11	Vietnam (VIE)	271	270	280	285	1106	17	
	Đặng Lê Ngọc Mai	91	89	94	93	367	7	
	Nguyễn Thu Vân	92	94	95	97	378	6	
	Phạm Thị Hà	88	87	91	95	361	4	
12	Qatar (QAT)	276	266	271	273	1086	14	
	Souad Al-Khater	96	88	92	92	368	5	
	Nasra Mohammed	91	90	93	88	362	6	
	Hanadi Salem	89	88	86	93	356	3	
13	United Arab Emirates (UAE)	270	265	271	278	1084	17	
	Sumaya Al-Meshaiei	88	92	95	94	369	7	
	Shamma Al-Muhairi	90	89	85	91	355	5	
	Shaikha Al-Rumaithi	92	84	91	93	360	5	
