= Shooting at the 2010 Asian Games – Women's 25 metre pistol team =

Women's 25 metre pistol team at the 2010 Asian Games
- Venue: Aoti Shooting Range
- Dates: 16 November 2010
- Competitors: 36 from 12 nations

Medalists
| gold medal | Kazakhstan; Zauresh Baibussinova, Galina Belyayeva, Yuliya Drishlyuk |
| silver medal | Mongolia; Tömörchödöriin Bayartsetseg, Otryadyn Gündegmaa, Tsogbadrakhyn Mönkhzul |
| bronze medal | South Korea; Kim Byung-hee, Lee Ho-lim, Park Hye-soo |

The women's 25 metre pistol team competition at the 2010 Asian Games in Guangzhou, China, was held on 16 November at the Aoti Shooting Range.

== Schedule ==
All times are China Standard Time (UTC+08:00)

| Date | Time | Event |
|---|---|---|
| Tuesday, 16 November 2010 | 09:00 | Final |

== Records ==
Prior to this competition, the existing world, Asian and Games records were as follows.

| World Record | China | 1768 | Busan, South Korea | 4 October 2002 |
| Asian Record | China | 1768 | Busan, South Korea | 4 October 2002 |
| Games Record | China | 1768 | Busan, South Korea | 4 October 2002 |

== Results ==
| Rank | Team | Precision | | | Rapid | | | Total | Xs | Notes |
| Rank | Team | 1 | 2 | 3 | 1 | 2 | 3 | Total | Xs | Notes |
|---|---|---|---|---|---|---|---|---|---|---|
| 1st place, gold medalist(s) | Kazakhstan (KAZ) | 289 | 291 | 284 | 289 | 287 | 291 | 1731 | 35 | |
| | Zauresh Baibussinova | 95 | 98 | 93 | 97 | 94 | 97 | 574 | 13 | |
| | Galina Belyayeva | 96 | 95 | 98 | 93 | 96 | 98 | 576 | 9 | |
| | Yuliya Drishlyuk | 98 | 98 | 93 | 99 | 97 | 96 | 581 | 13 | |
| 2nd place, silver medalist(s) | Mongolia (MGL) | 289 | 286 | 283 | 289 | 291 | 287 | 1725 | 50 | |
| | Tömörchödöriin Bayartsetseg | 98 | 97 | 92 | 97 | 98 | 91 | 573 | 16 | |
| | Otryadyn Gündegmaa | 97 | 94 | 96 | 96 | 97 | 98 | 578 | 18 | |
| | Tsogbadrakhyn Mönkhzul | 94 | 95 | 95 | 96 | 96 | 98 | 574 | 16 | |
| 3rd place, bronze medalist(s) | South Korea (KOR) | 284 | 284 | 287 | 290 | 290 | 288 | 1723 | 46 | |
| | Kim Byung-hee | 95 | 92 | 95 | 95 | 97 | 92 | 566 | 13 | |
| | Lee Ho-lim | 94 | 97 | 96 | 98 | 97 | 98 | 580 | 17 | |
| | Park Hye-soo | 95 | 95 | 96 | 97 | 96 | 98 | 577 | 16 | |
| 4 | Japan (JPN) | 292 | 289 | 289 | 284 | 278 | 289 | 1721 | 61 | |
| | Yoko Inada | 98 | 97 | 95 | 93 | 93 | 95 | 571 | 17 | |
| | Yukari Mori | 97 | 97 | 99 | 97 | 99 | 98 | 587 | 25 | |
| | Kinuko Sato | 97 | 95 | 95 | 94 | 86 | 96 | 563 | 19 | |
| 5 | Vietnam (VIE) | 283 | 283 | 288 | 287 | 290 | 288 | 1719 | 44 | |
| | Đặng Lê Ngọc Mai | 95 | 92 | 92 | 95 | 94 | 95 | 563 | 11 | |
| | Nguyễn Thu Vân | 93 | 94 | 98 | 97 | 98 | 96 | 576 | 15 | |
| | Phạm Thị Hà | 95 | 97 | 98 | 95 | 98 | 97 | 580 | 18 | |
| 6 | North Korea (PRK) | 287 | 289 | 287 | 279 | 287 | 288 | 1717 | 47 | |
| | Jo Yong-suk | 96 | 98 | 97 | 98 | 97 | 99 | 585 | 18 | |
| | Kim Hyang-gum | 95 | 95 | 94 | 85 | 97 | 92 | 558 | 15 | |
| | Ri Hyang-sun | 96 | 96 | 96 | 96 | 93 | 97 | 574 | 14 | |
| 7 | India (IND) | 290 | 281 | 285 | 286 | 285 | 290 | 1717 | 42 | |
| | Rahi Sarnobat | 96 | 94 | 96 | 96 | 96 | 99 | 577 | 13 | |
| | Anisa Sayyed | 97 | 92 | 93 | 95 | 93 | 96 | 566 | 16 | |
| | Annu Raj Singh | 97 | 95 | 96 | 95 | 96 | 95 | 574 | 13 | |
| 8 | China (CHN) | 281 | 286 | 289 | 286 | 286 | 285 | 1713 | 50 | |
| | Guo Wenjun | 91 | 96 | 96 | 95 | 94 | 96 | 568 | 15 | |
| | Lu Miaoyi | 97 | 92 | 97 | 92 | 95 | 92 | 565 | 14 | |
| | Su Yuling | 93 | 98 | 96 | 99 | 97 | 97 | 580 | 21 | |
| 9 | Iran (IRI) | 284 | 286 | 283 | 286 | 288 | 281 | 1708 | 38 | |
| | Elham Harijani | 96 | 97 | 93 | 94 | 94 | 90 | 564 | 14 | |
| | Fatemeh Hosseini | 97 | 93 | 94 | 96 | 97 | 95 | 572 | 13 | |
| | Zeinab Ramezani | 91 | 96 | 96 | 96 | 97 | 96 | 572 | 11 | |
| 10 | Thailand (THA) | 288 | 284 | 290 | 280 | 273 | 283 | 1698 | 40 | |
| | Kanokkan Chaimongkol | 96 | 93 | 96 | 90 | 82 | 88 | 545 | 11 | |
| | Tanyaporn Prucksakorn | 95 | 97 | 97 | 97 | 95 | 98 | 579 | 14 | |
| | Naphaswan Yangpaiboon | 97 | 94 | 97 | 93 | 96 | 97 | 574 | 15 | |
| 11 | United Arab Emirates (UAE) | 281 | 279 | 279 | 266 | 267 | 282 | 1654 | 28 | |
| | Sumaya Al-Meshaiei | 94 | 93 | 95 | 95 | 96 | 97 | 570 | 10 | |
| | Shamma Al-Muhairi | 92 | 93 | 92 | 83 | 83 | 91 | 534 | 8 | |
| | Shaikha Al-Rumaithi | 95 | 93 | 92 | 88 | 88 | 94 | 550 | 10 | |
| 12 | Qatar (QAT) | 274 | 274 | 263 | 273 | 268 | 282 | 1634 | 21 | |
| | Souad Al-Khater | 92 | 93 | 92 | 89 | 92 | 92 | 550 | 5 | |
| | Nasra Mohammed | 89 | 89 | 80 | 95 | 93 | 94 | 540 | 5 | |
| | Hanadi Salem | 93 | 92 | 91 | 89 | 83 | 96 | 544 | 11 | |
