= Shooting at the 2006 Asian Games – Women's 10 metre air pistol =

Women's 10 metre air pistol at the 2006 Asian Games
- Venue: Lusail Shooting Range
- Dates: 3 December 2006
- Competitors: 60 from 23 nations

Medalists
gold medal	Tao Luna	China
silver medal	Guo Wenjun	China
bronze medal	Kim Byung-hee	South Korea

The women's 10 metre air pistol competition at the 2006 Asian Games in Doha, Qatar was held on 3 December at the Lusail Shooting Range.

== Schedule ==
All times are Arabia Standard Time (UTC+03:00)

Date	Time	Event
Sunday, 3 December 2006	10:15	Qualification
Sunday, 3 December 2006	15:00	Final

== Records ==
Prior to this competition, the existing world, Asian and Games records were as follows.

Qualification
World Record	Svetlana Smirnova (RUS)	393	Munich, Germany	23 May 1998
Asian Record	Cai Yieqing (CHN)	390	Atlanta, United States	26 August 1998
Games Record	Tao Luna (CHN)	390	Busan, South Korea	3 October 2002
Final
World Record	Ren Jie (CHN)	493.5	Munich, Germany	22 May 1999
Asian Record	Ren Jie (CHN)	493.5	Munich, Germany	22 May 1999
Games Record	Tao Luna (CHN)	487.2	Busan, South Korea	3 October 2002

== Results ==
=== Qualification ===
Rank	Athlete	Series				Total	Notes
Rank	Athlete	1	2	3	4	Total	Notes
1	Tao Luna (CHN)	97	98	98	98	391	AR
2	Guo Wenjun (CHN)	98	96	98	97	389	
3	Kim Byung-hee (KOR)	96	97	98	95	386	
4	Tsogbadrakhyn Mönkhzul (MGL)	96	95	97	97	385	
5	Harveen Srao (IND)	95	98	94	96	383	
6	Otryadyn Gündegmaa (MGL)	93	97	95	96	381	
7	Lee Ho-lim (KOR)	94	97	94	96	381	
8	Chen Ying (CHN)	97	94	94	96	381	
9	Sonia Rai (IND)	98	93	94	96	381	
10	Huang Yi-ling (TPE)	94	94	99	93	380	
11	Ri Hyang-sun (PRK)	96	96	95	93	380	
12	Kang Un-byol (PRK)	92	97	95	95	379	
13	Nasim Hassanpour (IRI)	95	94	97	93	379	
14	Tanyaporn Prucksakorn (THA)	92	96	94	96	378	
15	Pak Sol-hwa (PRK)	93	97	93	95	378	
16	Ma Yu-mei (TPE)	93	93	98	94	378	
17	Shweta Chaudhary (IND)	94	98	94	92	378	
18	Đặng Lê Ngọc Mai (VIE)	93	92	94	98	377	
19	Joseline Cheah (MAS)	93	96	94	94	377	
20	Chanyanuch Kobkuntnachai (THA)	94	95	94	94	377	
21	Tsai Chia-hui (TPE)	94	93	98	92	377	
22	Zauresh Baibussinova (KAZ)	93	94	97	92	376	
23	Zabida Yrsalieva (KGZ)	95	97	93	91	376	
24	Michiko Fukushima (JPN)	92	95	93	94	374	
25	Siti Nur Masitah Badrin (MAS)	91	95	95	93	374	
26	Lo Ka Kay (HKG)	91	96	94	93	374	
27	Yoko Inada (JPN)	92	95	95	92	374	
28	Assel Berkina (KAZ)	94	97	93	90	374	
29	Yukari Konishi (JPN)	93	91	93	96	373	
30	Boo Soon-hee (KOR)	95	94	91	93	373	
31	Bibiana Ng (MAS)	93	95	95	90	373	
32	Nguyễn Thu Vân (VIE)	91	94	91	96	372	
33	Wanwarin Yusawat (THA)	94	91	93	94	372	
34	Yuliya Bondareva (KAZ)	96	93	92	91	372	
35	Damayanthi Wijeratne (SRI)	90	93	94	94	371	
36	Shamma Al-Muhairi (UAE)	91	94	93	93	371	
37	Phạm Thị Hà (VIE)	92	88	99	92	371	
38	Susan Aguado (PHI)	93	93	91	93	370	
39	Shokoufeh Akasheh (IRI)	92	88	92	97	369	
40	Marzieh Mehrabi (IRI)	89	92	93	95	369	
41	Ip Pui Yi (HKG)	89	91	95	94	369	
42	Hemantha Wijesinghe (SRI)	91	94	94	89	368	
43	Chan Pou Pou (MAC)	90	91	92	93	366	
44	Souad Al-Khater (QAT)	90	94	91	91	366	
45	Chan Lai Ping (HKG)	91	93	89	92	365	
46	Mehwish Maqsood (PAK)	89	93	91	91	364	
47	Gantömöriin Kherlentsetseg (MGL)	89	93	88	93	363	
48	Fatima Al-Haddad (BRN)	94	91	90	87	362	
49	Meri Ismailova (KGZ)	89	88	88	95	360	
50	Naheed Mohamed (BRN)	87	92	91	90	360	
51	May Razouki (KUW)	83	89	94	93	359	
52	Iun Hang I (MAC)	91	87	91	89	358	
53	Awatef Al-Qallaf (KUW)	88	90	88	90	356	
54	Hanadi Salem (QAT)	89	88	89	87	353	
55	Elena Travas (KGZ)	92	85	89	87	353	
56	Vong Iok In (MAC)	86	85	84	89	344	
57	Zarrina Babikova (TJK)	85	85	88	86	344	
58	Souad Al-Jattal (QAT)	82	84	81	90	337	
59	Noora Ajoor (BRN)	88	82	85	76	331	
60	Shaikha Al-Rumaithi (UAE)	75	84	84	79	322	

=== Final ===
Rank	Athlete	Qual.	Final											Total	S-off	Notes
Rank	Athlete	Qual.	1	2	3	4	5	6	7	8	9	10	Total	Total	S-off	Notes
1st place, gold medalist(s)	Tao Luna (CHN)	391	10.4	10.5	10.4	9.0	9.8	9.8	9.9	10.3	10.6	8.6	99.3	490.3		GR
2nd place, silver medalist(s)	Guo Wenjun (CHN)	389	9.5	10.1	9.6	10.3	9.2	9.1	10.5	9.5	9.9	10.3	98.0	487.0		
3rd place, bronze medalist(s)	Kim Byung-hee (KOR)	386	9.4	8.8	10.6	10.1	8.4	9.8	10.2	10.4	10.8	10.1	98.6	484.6		
4	Harveen Srao (IND)	383	8.8	10.3	10.5	9.5	10.1	10.4	10.5	10.6	10.1	10.7	101.5	484.5		
5	Tsogbadrakhyn Mönkhzul (MGL)	385	9.8	9.2	9.1	10.3	10.0	9.9	10.8	9.9	10.2	10.1	99.3	484.3		
6	Chen Ying (CHN)	381	10.3	9.4	10.0	10.5	10.2	10.0	10.9	10.5	9.1	10.1	101.0	482.0		
7	Lee Ho-lim (KOR)	381	10.4	7.6	9.0	10.0	10.4	9.2	9.6	10.6	10.3	10.7	97.8	478.8		
8	Otryadyn Gündegmaa (MGL)	381	9.9	8.0	9.1	9.8	9.9	9.9	10.1	9.7	10.2	10.0	96.6	477.6		
