= Shooting at the 2014 Asian Games – Women's 10 metre air pistol =

Women's 10 metre air pistol at the 2014 Asian Games
- Venue: Ongnyeon International Shooting Range
- Dates: 20 September 2014
- Competitors: 52 from 21 nations

Medalists
gold medal	Zhang Mengyuan	China
silver medal	Jung Jee-hae	South Korea
bronze medal	Shweta Chaudhary	India

The women's 10 metre air pistol competition at the 2014 Asian Games in Incheon, South Korea was held on 20 September at the Ongnyeon International Shooting Range.

== Schedule ==
All times are Korea Standard Time (UTC+09:00)

Date	Time	Event
Saturday, 20 September 2014	08:00	Qualification
Saturday, 20 September 2014	10:00	Final

== Records ==
Prior to this competition, the existing world, Asian and Games records were as follows.

Qualification
World Record	Svetlana Smirnova (RUS)	393	Munich, Germany	23 May 1998
Asian Record	Guo Wenjun (CHN)	392	Milan, Italy	24 May 2009
Games Record	Tao Luna (CHN)	391	Doha, Qatar	3 December 2006
Final
World Record	Heena Sidhu (IND)	203.8	Munich, Germany	10 November 2013
Asian Record	Heena Sidhu (IND)	203.8	Munich, Germany	10 November 2013
Games Record	—	—	—	—

== Results ==
=== Qualification ===
Rank	Athlete	Series				Total	Xs	Notes
Rank	Athlete	1	2	3	4	Total	Xs	Notes
1	Kim Jang-mi (KOR)	94	98	98	94	384	13	
2	Jung Jee-hae (KOR)	95	95	96	98	384	9	
3	Guo Wenjun (CHN)	94	97	95	98	384	9	
4	Shweta Chaudhary (IND)	97	94	97	95	383	13	
5	Wu Chia-ying (TPE)	97	96	94	96	383	6	
6	Otryadyn Gündegmaa (MGL)	91	99	98	94	382	13	
7	Zhang Mengyuan (CHN)	95	96	94	96	381	12	
8	Zhou Qingyuan (CHN)	94	97	95	95	381	11	
9	Tsogbadrakhyn Mönkhzul (MGL)	95	93	94	99	381	10	
10	Teh Xiu Hong (SIN)	96	97	92	96	381	10	
11	Pim-on Klaisuban (THA)	95	93	97	95	380	12	
12	Tu Yi Yi-tzu (TPE)	96	95	94	95	380	10	
13	Heena Sidhu (IND)	94	97	92	95	378	12	
14	Tien Chia-chen (TPE)	96	92	96	94	378	7	
15	Tömörchödöriin Bayartsetseg (MGL)	90	93	99	95	377	12	
16	Teo Shun Xie (SIN)	91	97	94	95	377	10	
17	Lê Thị Hoàng Ngọc (VIE)	97	92	93	95	377	8	
18	Sara Mirabi (IRI)	95	93	92	96	376	10	
19	Triệu Thị Hoa Hồng (VIE)	95	92	96	93	376	9	
20	Kinuko Sato (JPN)	94	96	92	94	376	5	
21	Shing Ho Ching (HKG)	94	94	95	92	375	11	
22	Princhuda Methaweewong (THA)	93	96	93	92	374	9	
23	Wadha Al-Balushi (OMA)	96	94	94	90	374	7	
24	Malaika Goel (IND)	91	96	91	95	373	8	
25	Naphaswan Yangpaiboon (THA)	94	93	93	92	372	10	
26	Nicole Tan (SIN)	92	94	91	95	372	7	
27	Yuliya Drishlyuk (KAZ)	93	95	89	95	372	7	
28	Oh Min-kyung (KOR)	93	93	92	94	372	7	
29	Elham Harijani (IRI)	91	92	96	93	372	7	
30	Zauresh Baibussinova (KAZ)	93	92	93	92	370	8	
31	Alia Sazana Azahari (MAS)	91	92	94	93	370	7	
32	Yukari Konishi (JPN)	97	90	94	89	370	2	
33	Armin Asha (BAN)	95	93	89	92	369	9	
34	Yuliya Komendra (KAZ)	88	95	92	94	369	5	
35	Sarina Gharabat (IRI)	91	91	94	92	368	8	
36	Lubna Abdulaziz Ahmed (BRN)	95	89	92	92	368	7	
37	Mehwish Maqsood (PAK)	91	92	92	93	368	6	
38	Đặng Lê Ngọc Mai (VIE)	91	96	87	93	367	8	
39	Yoko Inada (JPN)	92	90	90	93	365	6	
40	Ardina Ferdous (BAN)	88	94	91	92	365	5	
41	Sinthia Naznin Tumpa (BAN)	91	84	93	94	362	5	
42	Nasra Mohammed (QAT)	92	89	89	92	362	4	
43	Ip Pui Yi (HKG)	95	87	90	88	360	2	
44	Eman Boland (KUW)	92	85	89	93	359	7	
45	Al-Dana Al-Mubarak (QAT)	90	89	91	88	358	3	
46	Hanadi Salem (QAT)	86	90	88	93	357	4	
47	Vong Iok In (MAC)	90	88	84	86	348	3	
48	Anastasiya Kozak (TJK)	87	85	88	86	346	4	
49	Chao Wa Kuan (MAC)	86	88	83	85	342	5	
50	Sabrina Akhmedova (TJK)	85	85	81	89	340	4	
51	Asraa Bahman (KUW)	85	95	74	85	339	1	
52	Cheong Lok Si (MAC)	85	85	83	81	334	1	

=== Final ===
Rank	Athlete	1st stage		2nd stage – Elimination							S-off	Notes
Rank	Athlete	1	2	1	2	3	4	5	6	7	S-off	Notes
1st place, gold medalist(s)	Zhang Mengyuan (CHN)	27.4	58.7	79.6	99.9	119.5	140.5	161.6	182.5	202.2		GR
2nd place, silver medalist(s)	Jung Jee-hae (KOR)	29.0	58.4	77.4	97.1	117.7	138.9	159.8	180.4	201.3		
3rd place, bronze medalist(s)	Shweta Chaudhary (IND)	30.8	60.8	77.8	97.8	117.7	138.3	157.3	176.4			
4	Zhou Qingyuan (CHN)	28.3	59.6	80.8	99.5	119.1	137.8	157.3			SO	
5	Guo Wenjun (CHN)	28.1	58.2	78.4	97.5	117.1	137.2					
6	Wu Chia-ying (TPE)	28.2	56.9	78.0	97.5	116.6						
7	Kim Jang-mi (KOR)	28.2	56.7	77.9	96.1							
8	Otryadyn Gündegmaa (MGL)	28.3	56.2	75.9								
