= Shooting at the 2006 Asian Games – Women's 25 metre pistol =

Women's 25 metre pistol at the 2006 Asian Games
- Venue: Lusail Shooting Range
- Dates: 5 December 2006
- Competitors: 55 from 22 nations

Medalists
gold medal	Chen Ying	China
silver medal	Tao Luna	China
bronze medal	Kim Byung-hee	South Korea

The women's 25 metre pistol competition at the 2006 Asian Games in Doha, Qatar was held on 5 December at the Lusail Shooting Range.

== Schedule ==
All times are Arabia Standard Time (UTC+03:00)

Date	Time	Event
Tuesday, 5 December 2006	08:00	Qualification
Tuesday, 5 December 2006	13:30	Final

== Records ==
Prior to this competition, the existing world, Asian and Games records were as follows.

Qualification
World Record	Diana Iorgova (BUL)	594	Milan, Italy	31 May 1994
Asian Record	Tao Luna (CHN)	594	Munich, Germany	23 August 2002
Games Record	Chen Ying (CHN)	592	Busan, South Korea	4 October 2002
Final
World Record	Maria Grozdeva (BUL)	796.7	Changwon, South Korea	11 April 2005
Asian Record	Otryadyn Gündegmaa (MGL)	796.5	Changwon, South Korea	11 April 2005
Games Record	—	—	—	—

== Results ==
Legend

- DNF — Did not finish

=== Qualification ===
Rank	Athlete	Precision			Rapid			Total	Notes
Rank	Athlete	1	2	3	1	2	3	Total	Notes
1	Chen Ying (CHN)	96	96	99	99	98	99	587	
2	Tao Luna (CHN)	96	100	99	95	100	97	587	
3	Kim Byung-hee (KOR)	99	97	99	91	98	94	578	
4	Otryadyn Gündegmaa (MGL)	92	95	97	95	99	99	577	
5	Yoko Inada (JPN)	98	97	96	96	93	97	577	
6	Bibiana Ng (MAS)	97	95	98	98	93	96	577	
7	Yuliya Bondareva (KAZ)	94	95	97	97	99	95	577	
8	Choi Kum-ran (KOR)	95	95	92	99	96	99	576	
9	Yukari Konishi (JPN)	98	95	96	93	97	97	576	
10	Michiko Fukushima (JPN)	94	94	97	97	99	95	576	
11	Zauresh Baibussinova (KAZ)	96	96	97	97	95	95	576	
12	Zabida Yrsalieva (KGZ)	96	95	95	98	94	97	575	
13	Cao Ying (CHN)	96	98	97	96	97	91	575	
14	Nguyễn Thu Vân (VIE)	90	96	93	96	98	99	572	
15	Tsogbadrakhyn Mönkhzul (MGL)	95	88	97	97	98	97	572	
16	Đặng Lê Ngọc Mai (VIE)	93	90	95	98	98	97	571	
17	Phạm Thị Hà (VIE)	93	96	97	95	94	96	571	
18	Siti Nur Masitah Badrin (MAS)	95	97	95	98	95	91	571	
19	Pak Sol-hwa (PRK)	98	95	94	93	91	99	570	
20	Tanyaporn Prucksakorn (THA)	95	92	98	97	94	94	570	
21	Shweta Chaudhary (IND)	98	95	96	95	96	89	569	
22	Kang Un-byol (PRK)	96	96	96	89	96	94	567	
23	Gantömöriin Kherlentsetseg (MGL)	93	92	95	96	91	98	565	
24	Chiu York Kei (HKG)	94	93	97	97	92	92	565	
25	Nasim Hassanpour (IRI)	95	97	90	93	96	93	564	
26	Shamma Al-Muhairi (UAE)	93	93	94	92	96	95	563	
27	Ri Hyang-sun (PRK)	94	96	95	88	91	98	562	
28	Chong Kuai Iok (MAC)	92	94	91	97	93	95	562	
29	Sonia Rai (IND)	95	92	96	94	90	95	562	
30	Chanyanuch Kobkuntnachai (THA)	90	92	93	95	95	96	561	
31	Boo Soon-hee (KOR)	92	94	94	90	95	93	558	
32	Phanchang Chaisaard (THA)	94	91	99	89	92	93	558	
33	Chan Pou Pou (MAC)	92	92	91	92	94	96	557	
34	Souad Al-Khater (QAT)	93	94	90	91	93	95	556	
35	Joseline Cheah (MAS)	94	91	96	91	91	92	555	
36	Susan Aguado (PHI)	96	95	90	86	96	87	550	
37	Aishath Zeena (MDV)	92	91	89	89	94	92	547	
38	Elena Travas (KGZ)	92	94	93	88	88	91	546	
39	Damayanthi Wijeratne (SRI)	92	91	94	90	88	88	543	
40	Assel Berkina (KAZ)	90	92	93	85	91	90	541	
41	Hemantha Wijesinghe (SRI)	92	97	96	84	84	88	541	
42	Hanadi Salem (QAT)	90	89	93	92	82	94	540	
43	Iun Hang I (MAC)	85	84	92	90	95	91	537	
44	Marzieh Mehrabi (IRI)	80	92	93	88	92	91	536	
45	Meri Ismailova (KGZ)	88	90	96	85	87	90	536	
46	Zarrina Babikova (TJK)	89	89	88	85	80	90	521	
47	Naheed Mohamed (BRN)	86	96	94	76	84	81	517	
48	Mehwish Maqsood (PAK)	91	91	95	86	77	75	515	
49	Shokoufeh Akasheh (IRI)	90	94	94	73	79	69	499	
50	Shaikha Al-Rumaithi (UAE)	89	89	93	75	64	76	486	
51	Afrah Ajaj (BRN)	80	79	66	82	81	88	476	
52	Hana Al-Mohammed (QAT)	73	84	81	74	78	84	474	
53	Noora Ajoor (BRN)	77	82	85	64	79	76	463	
54	Ramziyya Abdulla (MDV)	75	69	79	70	60	69	422	
55	Fathimath Azima (MDV)	56	73	70				199	DNF

=== Final ===
Rank	Athlete	Qual.	Final											Total	S-off	Notes
Rank	Athlete	Qual.	1	2	3	4	5	6	7	8	9	10	Total	Total	S-off	Notes
1st place, gold medalist(s)	Chen Ying (CHN)	587	9.5	10.5	9.5	10.3	10.1	10.2	10.4	10.7	10.6	10.7	205.2	792.2		GR
1st place, gold medalist(s)	Chen Ying (CHN)	587	10.0	9.8	10.7	10.2	10.7	10.6	10.3	9.6	10.4	10.4	205.2	792.2		GR
2nd place, silver medalist(s)	Tao Luna (CHN)	587	10.7	10.4	10.2	10.4	10.3	10.5	9.1	10.6	10.4	10.0	203.7	790.7		
2nd place, silver medalist(s)	Tao Luna (CHN)	587	10.5	10.7	9.5	9.5	10.7	9.8	9.5	9.6	10.6	10.7	203.7	790.7		
3rd place, bronze medalist(s)	Kim Byung-hee (KOR)	578	10.4	10.3	10.4	10.1	10.2	9.6	10.7	10.4	10.5	10.7	207.3	785.3		
3rd place, bronze medalist(s)	Kim Byung-hee (KOR)	578	10.7	10.8	10.5	10.8	10.6	9.5	10.0	10.5	10.3	10.3	207.3	785.3		
4	Otryadyn Gündegmaa (MGL)	577	10.6	10.0	9.9	10.2	10.0	10.4	10.3	10.4	10.2	10.5	204.0	781.0		
4	Otryadyn Gündegmaa (MGL)	577	9.7	10.9	10.4	10.5	10.4	9.4	9.5	9.8	10.6	10.3	204.0	781.0		
5	Choi Kum-ran (KOR)	576	9.4	10.3	9.6	8.9	10.6	9.1	10.0	10.2	10.4	10.7	199.5	775.5		
5	Choi Kum-ran (KOR)	576	9.3	10.4	10.3	10.4	9.3	10.6	9.1	10.4	10.0	10.5	199.5	775.5		
6	Yoko Inada (JPN)	577	9.2	9.9	10.4	9.1	9.9	10.5	10.1	8.4	10.5	10.9	197.3	774.3		
6	Yoko Inada (JPN)	577	9.4	7.6	9.3	10.3	10.3	10.6	10.3	9.5	10.4	10.7	197.3	774.3		
7	Yuliya Bondareva (KAZ)	577	8.9	10.7	10.5	9.6	10.5	8.6	9.9	10.3	10.5	9.7	197.2	774.2		
7	Yuliya Bondareva (KAZ)	577	10.3	10.1	10.4	10.6	9.8	6.4	10.5	10.0	10.2	9.7	197.2	774.2		
8	Bibiana Ng (MAS)	577	9.5	10.4	10.4	10.4	8.5	10.0	9.9	9.7	10.1	10.0	196.3	773.3		
8	Bibiana Ng (MAS)	577	10.3	9.9	10.2	10.0	10.5	8.8	8.9	9.8	10.0	9.0	196.3	773.3		
