= Shooting at the 2010 Asian Games – Men's double trap team =

Men's double trap team at the 2010 Asian Games
- Venue: Guangzhou Shotgun Centre
- Dates: 21 November 2010
- Competitors: 30 from 10 nations

Medalists
gold medal	China; Hu Binyuan, Mo Junjie, Pan Qiang
silver medal	Athletes from Kuwait; Hamad Al-Afasi, Fehaid Al-Deehani, Mashfi Al-Mutairi
bronze medal	India; Vikram Bhatnagar, Asher Noria, Ronjan Sodhi

The men's double trap team competition at the 2010 Asian Games in Guangzhou, China was held on 21 November at the Guangzhou Shotgun Centre.

== Schedule ==
All times are China Standard Time (UTC+08:00)

Date	Time	Event
Sunday, 21 November 2010	09:00	Final

== Records ==
Prior to this competition, the existing world, Asian and Games records were as follows.

World Record	United States	433	Munich, Germany	5 August 2010
Asian Record	China	424	Doha, Qatar	5 December 2006
Games Record	China	424	Doha, Qatar	5 December 2006

== Results ==
Rank	Team	Round			Total	Notes
Rank	Team	1	2	3	Total	Notes
1st place, gold medalist(s)	China (CHN)	138	134	142	414	
	Hu Binyuan	46	42	47	135	
	Mo Junjie	45	43	48	136	
	Pan Qiang	47	49	47	143	
2nd place, silver medalist(s)	Athletes from Kuwait (IOC)	135	134	138	407	
	Hamad Al-Afasi	47	42	47	136	
	Fehaid Al-Deehani	45	45	47	137	
	Mashfi Al-Mutairi	43	47	44	134	
3rd place, bronze medalist(s)	India (IND)	140	129	134	403	
	Vikram Bhatnagar	47	40	43	130	
	Asher Noria	46	45	43	134	
	Ronjan Sodhi	47	44	48	139	
4	United Arab Emirates (UAE)	127	129	138	394	
	Juma Al-Maktoum	45	46	47	138	
	Saif Al-Shamsi	44	41	43	128	
	Ahmed Dhahi	38	42	48	128	
5	Qatar (QAT)	131	130	130	391	
	Masoud Hamad Al-Athba	42	37	40	119	
	Rashid Hamad Al-Athba	45	46	45	136	
	Hamad Al-Marri	44	47	45	136	
6	Iran (IRI)	131	124	133	388	
	Masoud Azizian	47	42	44	133	
	Amir Chavoshi	41	40	43	124	
	Saeid Sadri	43	42	46	131	
7	South Korea (KOR)	127	131	129	387	
	Chun Hong-jae	39	43	45	127	
	Jung Yoon-kyun	44	44	42	130	
	Park Jun-young	44	44	42	130	
8	Chinese Taipei (TPE)	127	123	122	372	
	Chang Chien Ming-shan	37	37	38	112	
	Chen Shih-wei	43	44	45	132	
	Shih Wei-tin	47	42	39	128	
9	Malaysia (MAS)	128	121	122	371	
	Benjamin Khor	43	39	39	121	
	Khor Seng Chye	46	42	42	130	
	Tan Tian Xiang	39	40	41	120	
10	Singapore (SIN)	116	122	121	359	
	Zain Amat	42	41	43	126	
	Chow Wei An	40	37	37	114	
	Muhd Ikram Ismail	34	44	41	119	
