= Shooting at the 2010 Asian Games – Men's double trap =

Men's double trap at the 2010 Asian Games
- Venue: Guangzhou Shotgun Centre
- Dates: 21 November 2010
- Competitors: 33 from 13 nations

Medalists
gold medal	Ronjan Sodhi	India
silver medal	Juma Al-Maktoum	United Arab Emirates
bronze medal	Hamad Al-Marri	Qatar

The men's double trap competition at the 2010 Asian Games in Guangzhou, China was held on 21 November at the Guangzhou Shotgun Centre.

== Schedule ==
All times are China Standard Time (UTC+08:00)

Date	Time	Event
Sunday, 21 November 2010	09:00	Qualification
Sunday, 21 November 2010	13:30	Final

== Records ==
Prior to this competition, the existing world, Asian and Games records were as follows.

Qualification
World Record	Michael Diamond (AUS)	147	Barcelona, Spain	19 July 1998
Asian Record	Ronjan Sodhi (IND)	147	Belgrade, Serbia	18 June 2008
Games Record	Fehaid Al-Deehani (KUW)	145	Hiroshima, Japan	10 October 1994
Final
World Record	Hu Binyuan (CHN)	196	Minsk, Belarus	10 June 2009
Asian Record	Hu Binyuan (CHN)	196	Minsk, Belarus	10 June 2009
Games Record	Wang Nan (CHN)	189	Doha, Qatar	5 December 2006

== Results ==
=== Qualification ===
Rank	Athlete	Round			Total	S-off	Notes
Rank	Athlete	1	2	3	Total	S-off	Notes
1	Pan Qiang (CHN)	47	49	47	143		
2	Ronjan Sodhi (IND)	47	44	48	139		
3	Juma Al-Maktoum (UAE)	45	46	47	138		
4	Fehaid Al-Deehani (IOC)	45	45	47	137		
5	Mo Junjie (CHN)	45	43	48	136	+2	
6	Hamad Al-Marri (QAT)	44	47	45	136	+2	
7	Hamad Al-Afasi (IOC)	47	42	47	136	+1	
8	Rashid Hamad Al-Athba (QAT)	45	46	45	136	+1	
9	Hu Binyuan (CHN)	46	42	47	135		
10	Mashfi Al-Mutairi (IOC)	43	47	44	134		
11	Asher Noria (IND)	46	45	43	134		
12	Masoud Azizian (IRI)	47	42	44	133		
13	Chen Shih-wei (TPE)	43	44	45	132		
14	Athimeth Khamgasem (THA)	45	42	45	132		
15	Saeid Sadri (IRI)	43	42	46	131		
16	Vikram Bhatnagar (IND)	47	40	43	130		
17	Jung Yoon-kyun (KOR)	44	44	42	130		
18	Park Jun-young (KOR)	44	44	42	130		
19	Khor Seng Chye (MAS)	46	42	42	130		
20	Ahmed Dhahi (UAE)	38	42	48	128		
21	Saif Al-Shamsi (UAE)	44	41	43	128		
22	Shih Wei-tin (TPE)	47	42	39	128		
23	Chun Hong-jae (KOR)	39	43	45	127		
24	Zain Amat (SIN)	42	41	43	126		
25	Amir Chavoshi (IRI)	41	40	43	124		
26	Benjamin Khor (MAS)	43	39	39	121		
27	Tan Tian Xiang (MAS)	39	40	41	120		
28	Muhd Ikram Ismail (SIN)	34	44	41	119		
29	Masoud Hamad Al-Athba (QAT)	42	37	40	119		
30	Chow Wei An (SIN)	40	37	37	114		
31	Chang Chien Ming-shan (TPE)	37	37	38	112		
32	Wissam Khalil (LIB)	37	40	34	111		
33	Aamer Iqbal (PAK)	41	31	38	110		

=== Final ===
Rank	Athlete	Qual.	Final	Total	S-off	Notes
1st place, gold medalist(s)	Ronjan Sodhi (IND)	139	47	186		
2nd place, silver medalist(s)	Juma Al-Maktoum (UAE)	138	44	182		
3rd place, bronze medalist(s)	Hamad Al-Marri (QAT)	136	45	181	+9	
4	Fehaid Al-Deehani (IOC)	137	44	181	+8	
5	Pan Qiang (CHN)	143	38	181	+1	
6	Mo Junjie (CHN)	136	44	180		
