= Shooting at the 2010 Asian Games – Women's trap =

Women's trap at the 2010 Asian Games
- Venue: Guangzhou Shotgun Centre
- Dates: 19 November 2010
- Competitors: 28 from 12 nations

Medalists
gold medal	Yukie Nakayama	Japan
silver medal	Gao E	China
bronze medal	Liu Yingzi	China

The women's trap competition at the 2010 Asian Games in Guangzhou, China was held on 19 November at the Guangzhou Shotgun Centre.

== Schedule ==
All times are China Standard Time (UTC+08:00)

Date	Time	Event
Friday, 19 November 2010	09:00	Qualification
Friday, 19 November 2010	13:00	Final

== Records ==
Prior to this competition, the existing world, Asian and Games records were as follows.

Qualification
World Record	Viktoria Chuyko (UKR)	74	Nicosia, Cyprus	13 June 1998
Asian Record	Chen Li (CHN)	74	Qingyuan, China	4 April 2006
Games Record	Chen Li (CHN)	69	Doha, Qatar	2 December 2006
Final
World Record	Zuzana Štefečeková (SVK)	96	Qingyuan, China	4 April 2006
Asian Record	Chen Li (CHN)	95	Qingyuan, China	4 April 2006
Games Record	Chen Li (CHN)	89	Doha, Qatar	2 December 2006

== Results ==
=== Qualification ===
Rank	Athlete	Round			Total	S-off	Notes
Rank	Athlete	1	2	3	Total	S-off	Notes
1	Yukie Nakayama (JPN)	25	24	22	71		GR
2	Chae Hye-gyong (PRK)	24	23	21	68		
3	Liu Yingzi (CHN)	24	24	20	68		
4	Lee Bo-na (KOR)	23	20	23	66		
5	Gao E (CHN)	21	23	22	66		
6	Tian Xia (CHN)	24	23	19	66		
7	Anastassiya Davydova (KAZ)	23	21	21	65		
8	Shagun Chowdhary (IND)	22	20	22	64		
9	Lin Yi-chun (TPE)	22	22	19	63		
10	Pak Yong-hui (PRK)	22	22	19	63		
11	Ray Bassil (LIB)	18	20	24	62		
12	Hoàng Thị Tuất (VIE)	18	22	22	62		
13	Seema Tomar (IND)	22	20	19	61		
14	Masoumeh Ameri (IRI)	20	16	24	60		
15	Yang Sol-i (PRK)	19	19	22	60		
16	Nanpapas Viravaidya (THA)	16	23	21	60		
17	Kang Gee-eun (KOR)	18	19	22	59		
18	Noora Al-Ali (QAT)	19	20	19	58		
19	Keiko Suzu (JPN)	21	21	16	58		
20	Eom So-yeon (KOR)	18	20	19	57		
21	Shreyasi Singh (IND)	20	16	20	56		
22	Amna Al-Abdulla (QAT)	19	21	16	56		
23	Narges Ranjbar (IRI)	20	15	19	54		
24	Mariya Dmitriyenko (KAZ)	13	18	18	49		
25	Nawal Al-Khalaf (QAT)	15	16	18	49		
26	Sepideh Sirani (IRI)	16	15	16	47		
27	Huang Yen-hua (TPE)	15	13	16	44		
28	Lo Tsai-hsin (TPE)	13	12	10	35		

=== Final ===
Rank	Athlete	Qual.	Final	Total	S-off	Notes
1st place, gold medalist(s)	Yukie Nakayama (JPN)	71	18	89		
2nd place, silver medalist(s)	Gao E (CHN)	66	19	85		
3rd place, bronze medalist(s)	Liu Yingzi (CHN)	68	16	84		
4	Chae Hye-gyong (PRK)	68	14	82		
5	Lee Bo-na (KOR)	66	14	80		
6	Tian Xia (CHN)	66	13	79		
