= Shooting at the 2010 Asian Games – Women's trap team =

2010 Asian Games in Guangzhou, China

Women's trap team at the 2010 Asian Games
- Venue: Guangzhou Shotgun Centre
- Dates: 19 November 2010
- Competitors: 21 from 7 nations

Medalists
gold medal	China; Gao E, Liu Yingzi, Tian Xia
silver medal	North Korea; Chae Hye-gyong, Pak Yong-hui, Yang Sol-i
bronze medal	South Korea; Eom So-yeon, Kang Gee-eun, Lee Bo-na

The women's trap team competition at the 2010 Asian Games in Guangzhou, China was held on 19 November at the Guangzhou Shotgun Centre.

== Schedule ==
All times are China Standard Time (UTC+08:00)

Date	Time	Event
Friday, 19 November 2010	09:00	Final

== Records ==
Prior to this competition, the existing world, Asian and Games records were as follows.

World Record	Italy	211	Maribor, Slovenia	11 August 2009
Asian Record	China	210	Barcelona, Spain	23 July 1998
Games Record	China	195	Doha, Qatar	2 December 2006

== Results ==
Rank	Team	Round			Total	Notes
Rank	Team	1	2	3	Total	Notes
1st place, gold medalist(s)	China (CHN)	69	70	61	200	GR
	Gao E	21	23	22	66	
	Liu Yingzi	24	24	20	68	
	Tian Xia	24	23	19	66	
2nd place, silver medalist(s)	North Korea (PRK)	65	64	62	191	
	Chae Hye-gyong	24	23	21	68	
	Pak Yong-hui	22	22	19	63	
	Yang Sol-i	19	19	22	60	
3rd place, bronze medalist(s)	South Korea (KOR)	59	59	64	182	
	Eom So-yeon	18	20	19	57	
	Kang Gee-eun	18	19	22	59	
	Lee Bo-na	23	20	23	66	
4	India (IND)	64	56	61	181	
	Shagun Chowdhary	22	20	22	64	
	Shreyasi Singh	20	16	20	56	
	Seema Tomar	22	20	19	61	
5	Qatar (QAT)	53	57	53	163	
	Amna Al-Abdulla	19	21	16	56	
	Noora Al-Ali	19	20	19	58	
	Nawal Al-Khalaf	15	16	18	49	
6	Iran (IRI)	56	46	59	161	
	Masoumeh Ameri	20	16	24	60	
	Narges Ranjbar	20	15	19	54	
	Sepideh Sirani	16	15	16	47	
7	Chinese Taipei (TPE)	50	47	45	142	
	Huang Yen-hua	15	13	16	44	
	Lin Yi-chun	22	22	19	63	
	Lo Tsai-hsin	13	12	10	35	
