= Shooting at the 2010 Asian Games – Men's skeet =

Men's skeet at the 2010 Asian Games
- Venue: Guangzhou Shotgun Centre
- Dates: 23–24 November 2010
- Competitors: 37 from 14 nations

Medalists
gold medal	Abdullah Al-Rashidi	Athletes from Kuwait
silver medal	Masoud Saleh Al-Athba	Qatar
bronze medal	Nasser Al-Attiyah	Qatar

The men's skeet competition at the 2010 Asian Games in Guangzhou, China was held on 23 and 24 November at the Guangzhou Shotgun Centre.

== Schedule ==
All times are China Standard Time (UTC+08:00)

Date	Time	Event
Tuesday, 23 November 2010	09:00	Qualification day 1
Wednesday, 24 November 2010	09:00	Qualification day 2
Wednesday, 24 November 2010	14:00	Final

== Records ==
Prior to this competition, the existing world, Asian and Games records were as follows.

Qualification
World Record	Vincent Hancock (USA)	125	Lonato, Italy	14 June 2007
Asian Record	Jin Di (CHN); Qu Ridong (CHN)	124	Qingyuan, China	10 April 2006
Games Record	Salah Al-Mutairi (KUW); Saeed Al-Maktoum (UAE)	123	Doha, Qatar	8 December 2006
Final
World Record	Vincent Hancock (USA)	150	Lonato, Italy	14 June 2007
Asian Record	Qu Ridong (CHN); Sergey Yakshin (KAZ)	148	Qingyuan, China	10 April 2006
Games Record	Salah Al-Mutairi (KUW); Saeed Al-Maktoum (UAE)	147	Doha, Qatar	8 December 2006

== Results ==
Legend

- DNS — Did not start

=== Qualification ===
Rank	Athlete	Day 1		Day 2			Total	S-off	Notes
Rank	Athlete	1	2	3	4	5	Total	S-off	Notes
1	Abdullah Al-Rashidi (IOC)	25	23	25	24	24	121		
2	Masoud Saleh Al-Athba (QAT)	24	24	24	23	25	120		
3	Nasser Al-Attiyah (QAT)	24	23	25	23	24	119		
4	Vladislav Mukhamediyev (KAZ)	24	25	23	23	22	117		
5	Tang Shuai (CHN)	25	24	23	23	22	117		
6	Saif Bin Futtais (UAE)	24	23	22	24	23	116	+12	
7	Cho Yong-seong (KOR)	25	21	24	22	24	116	+11	
8	Zaid Al-Mutairi (IOC)	22	24	24	23	23	116	+7	
9	Qu Ridong (CHN)	22	24	25	22	23	116	+5	
10	Saeed Al-Maktoum (UAE)	21	22	23	25	23	114		
11	Jeon Chan-sik (KOR)	24	24	19	25	22	114		
12	Abdulaziz Al-Attiyah (QAT)	24	24	24	21	21	114		
13	Mairaj Ahmad Khan (IND)	23	23	22	21	24	113		
14	Cho Kwang-soo (KOR)	19	24	23	24	23	113		
15	Jiranunt Hathaichukiat (THA)	22	24	22	22	23	113		
16	Ziad Richa (LIB)	24	22	23	23	21	113		
17	Sergey Kolos (KAZ)	24	23	23	22	21	113		
18	Saeed Al-Mutairi (KSA)	22	22	22	23	23	112		
19	Jin Di (CHN)	24	20	22	24	22	112		
20	Allan Daniel Peoples (IND)	23	23	23	21	22	112		
21	Abdul Sattar Satti (PAK)	21	21	24	22	23	111		
22	Smit Singh (IND)	24	22	21	21	23	111		
23	Chang Chien Ming-shan (TPE)	22	22	22	21	23	110		
24	Tsai I-hsuan (TPE)	21	20	24	23	22	110		
25	Mohamed Hussain Ahmed (UAE)	23	21	22	23	21	110		
26	Lee Yee (SIN)	24	24	20	21	21	110		
27	Sergey Yakshin (KAZ)	24	24	21	20	21	110		
28	Salah Al-Mutairi (IOC)	20	25	21	21	21	108		
29	Khurram Inam (PAK)	21	20	22	23	21	107		
30	Majed Al-Tamimi (KSA)	22	21	20	23	21	107		
31	Amin Karamat (PAK)	23	18	22	21	22	106		
32	David Chan (SIN)	19	22	23	20	17	101		
33	Eugene Chiew (SIN)	18	20	19	19	19	95		
34	Lee Meng-yuan (TPE)	12	22	19	20	20	93		
35	Lkhanaagiin Bat-Ölzii (MGL)	16	17	19	19	16	87		
36	Daramragchaagiin Enkhtör (MGL)	13	10	10	13	11	57		
—	Abdullah Al-Shahrani (KSA)						DNS		

=== Final ===
Rank	Athlete	Qual.	Final	Total	S-off	Notes
1st place, gold medalist(s)	Abdullah Al-Rashidi (IOC)	121	23	144		
2nd place, silver medalist(s)	Masoud Saleh Al-Athba (QAT)	120	22	142		
3rd place, bronze medalist(s)	Nasser Al-Attiyah (QAT)	119	21	140		
4	Tang Shuai (CHN)	117	20	137	+7	
5	Vladislav Mukhamediyev (KAZ)	117	20	137	+6	
6	Saif Bin Futtais (UAE)	116	21	137	+0	
