= Shooting at the 2010 Asian Games – Women's skeet =

Women's skeet at the 2010 Asian Games
- Venue: Guangzhou Shotgun Centre
- Dates: 23 November 2010
- Competitors: 19 from 7 nations

Medalists
gold medal	Wei Ning	China
silver medal	Kim Min-ji	South Korea
bronze medal	Sutiya Jiewchaloemmit	Thailand

The women's skeet competition at the 2010 Asian Games in Guangzhou, China was held on 23 November at the Guangzhou Shotgun Centre.

== Schedule ==
All times are China Standard Time (UTC+08:00)

Date	Time	Event
Tuesday, 23 November 2010	09:00	Qualification
Tuesday, 23 November 2010	15:00	Final

== Records ==
Prior to this competition, the existing world, Asian and Games records were as follows.

Qualification
World Record	Elena Little (GBR)	74	Belgrade, Serbia & Montenegro	17 July 2005
Asian Record	Shi Hongyan (CHN)	74	Qingyuan, China	9 April 2006
Games Record	Wei Ning (CHN); Kim Myong-hwa (PRK)	71	Doha, Qatar	7 December 2006
Final
World Record	Danka Barteková (SVK)	99	Nicosia, Cyprus	9 July 2008
Asian Record	Wei Ning (CHN)	98	Munich, Germany	19 May 2009
Games Record	Wei Ning (CHN); Kim Myong-hwa (PRK)	93	Doha, Qatar	7 December 2006

== Results ==
=== Qualification ===
Rank	Athlete	Round			Total	S-off	Notes
Rank	Athlete	1	2	3	Total	S-off	Notes
1	Wei Ning (CHN)	25	24	22	71		
2	Kim Min-ji (KOR)	22	23	24	69		
3	Sutiya Jiewchaloemmit (THA)	21	23	23	67		
4	Nutchaya Sutarporn (THA)	21	23	22	66		
5	Angelina Michshuk (KAZ)	23	22	21	66		
6	Zhang Shan (CHN)	24	20	21	65	+2	
7	Wei Meng (CHN)	21	22	22	65	+1	
8	Arti Singh Rao (IND)	24	21	20	65	+1	
9	Kim Hyang-sun (PRK)	21	22	21	64		
10	Kim Ae-kyun (KOR)	22	21	21	64		
11	Kwak Yu-hyun (KOR)	22	21	20	63		
12	Isarapa Imprasertsuk (THA)	22	22	19	63		
13	Pak Kum-hui (PRK)	21	19	22	62		
14	Anastassiya Molchanova (KAZ)	21	17	20	58		
15	Zhaniya Aidarkhanova (KAZ)	20	18	19	57		
16	Deena Al-Tebaishi (QAT)	18	18	17	53		
17	Amal Al-Rafeea (QAT)	17	18	13	48		
18	Hanan Ali Haji (QAT)	15	15	17	47		
19	Kim Un-hye (PRK)	13	19	14	46		

=== Final ===
Rank	Athlete	Qual.	Final	Total	S-off	Notes
1st place, gold medalist(s)	Wei Ning (CHN)	71	23	94		GR
2nd place, silver medalist(s)	Kim Min-ji (KOR)	69	20	89		
3rd place, bronze medalist(s)	Sutiya Jiewchaloemmit (THA)	67	21	88		
4	Zhang Shan (CHN)	65	19	84		
5	Angelina Michshuk (KAZ)	66	17	83	+3	
6	Nutchaya Sutarporn (THA)	66	17	83	+2	
