= Shooting at the 2010 Asian Games – Men's 25 metre standard pistol team =

Men's 25 metre standard pistol team at the 2010 Asian Games
- Venue: Aoti Shooting Range
- Dates: 17 November 2010
- Competitors: 33 from 11 nations

Medalists
gold medal	South Korea; Hong Seong-hwan, Hwang Yoon-sam, Jang Dae-kyu
silver medal	China; Jin Yongde, Li Chuanlin, Liu Yadong
bronze medal	North Korea; Kim Chol-rim, Kim Jong-su, Ryu Myong-yon

The men's 25 metre standard pistol team competition at the 2010 Asian Games in Guangzhou, China was held on 17 November at the Aoti Shooting Range.

== Schedule ==
All times are China Standard Time (UTC+08:00)

Date	Time	Event
Wednesday, 17 November 2010	09:00	Final

== Records ==
Prior to this competition, the existing world, Asian and Games records were as follows.

World Record	Soviet Union	1725	Osijek, Yugoslavia	10 September 1985
Asian Record	China	1724	Busan, South Korea	8 October 2002
Games Record	China	1724	Busan, South Korea	8 October 2002

== Results ==
Rank	Team	150 Sec		20 Sec		10 Sec		Total	Xs	Notes
Rank	Team	1	2	1	2	1	2	Total	Xs	Notes
1st place, gold medalist(s)	South Korea (KOR)	288	291	286	285	281	277	1708	43	
	Hong Seong-hwan	97	97	96	98	95	92	575	20	
	Hwang Yoon-sam	96	95	97	92	93	90	563	11	
	Jang Dae-kyu	95	99	93	95	93	95	570	12	
2nd place, silver medalist(s)	China (CHN)	291	288	286	289	272	281	1707	47	
	Jin Yongde	97	97	96	96	91	93	570	16	
	Li Chuanlin	97	95	92	97	94	92	567	15	
	Liu Yadong	97	96	98	96	87	96	570	16	
3rd place, bronze medalist(s)	North Korea (PRK)	290	291	284	280	269	276	1690	37	
	Kim Chol-rim	95	93	94	92	93	93	560	12	
	Kim Jong-su	99	100	97	96	89	92	573	14	
	Ryu Myong-yon	96	98	93	92	87	91	557	11	
4	India (IND)	284	283	284	282	273	262	1668	31	
	C. K. Chaudhary	94	91	97	93	92	82	549	10	
	Samaresh Jung	96	98	93	96	92	94	569	13	
	Pemba Tamang	94	94	94	93	89	86	550	8	
5	Kazakhstan (KAZ)	287	287	284	273	265	270	1666	33	
	Vladimir Issachenko	96	99	95	93	89	94	566	13	
	Vyacheslav Podlesniy	96	93	96	89	87	93	554	11	
	Rashid Yunusmetov	95	95	93	91	89	83	546	9	
6	Vietnam (VIE)	284	282	271	280	270	272	1659	27	
	Bùi Quang Nam	95	93	90	92	90	92	552	9	
	Nguyễn Mạnh Tường	94	97	89	96	92	93	561	9	
	Phạm Anh Đạt	95	92	92	92	88	87	546	9	
7	Iran (IRI)	281	288	271	276	268	267	1651	27	
	Mohammad Ahmadi	94	98	89	93	85	90	549	9	
	Ebrahim Barkhordari	98	97	91	95	93	92	566	14	
	Reza Karimpour	89	93	91	88	90	85	536	4	
8	Thailand (THA)	280	283	274	277	267	269	1650	36	
	Prakarn Karndee	95	96	96	95	96	92	570	17	
	Vorapol Kulchairattana	90	93	88	88	81	80	520	5	
	Pruet Sriyaphan	95	94	90	94	90	97	560	14	
9	Hong Kong (HKG)	279	282	273	269	274	269	1646	30	
	Li Hao Jian	88	92	90	90	90	93	543	9	
	Wong Fai	97	97	96	91	91	87	559	14	
	Yang Joe Tsi	94	93	87	88	93	89	544	7	
10	Singapore (SIN)	279	279	272	278	271	260	1639	36	
	Gai Bin	95	95	91	94	95	90	560	12	
	On Shaw Ming	90	88	89	91	87	82	527	8	
	Poh Lip Meng	94	96	92	93	89	88	552	16	
11	Macau (MAC)	269	279	265	270	238	264	1585	19	
	Manuel de Jesus Cheom	91	92	88	91	76	90	528	2	
	Chio Hong Chi	90	91	92	91	90	90	544	9	
	Leong Chi Kin	88	96	85	88	72	84	513	8	
