= Shooting at the 2010 Asian Games – Men's 25 metre center fire pistol team =

Men's 25 metre center fire pistol team at the 2010 Asian Games
- Venue: Aoti Shooting Range
- Dates: 18 November 2010
- Competitors: 36 from 12 nations

Medalists
gold medal	China; Jin Yongde, Li Chuanlin, Liu Yadong
silver medal	South Korea; Hong Seong-hwan, Jang Dae-kyu, Park Byung-taek
bronze medal	North Korea; Kim Chol-rim, Kim Jong-su, Ryu Myong-yon

The men's 25 metre center-fire pistol team competition at the 2010 Asian Games in Guangzhou, China was held on 18 November at the Aoti Shooting Range.

== Schedule ==
All times are China Standard Time (UTC+08:00)

Date	Time	Event
Thursday, 18 November 2010	09:00	Final

== Records ==
Prior to this competition, the existing world, Asian and Games records were as follows.

World Record	Soviet Union	1762	Moscow, Soviet Union	15 August 1990
Asian Record	South Korea	1760	Lahti, Finland	14 July 2002
Games Record	North Korea; South Korea	1749	Bangkok, Thailand	13 December 1998

== Results ==
Rank	Team	Precision			Rapid			Total	Xs	Notes
Rank	Team	1	2	3	1	2	3	Total	Xs	Notes
1st place, gold medalist(s)	China (CHN)	289	289	288	295	289	293	1743	64	
	Jin Yongde	99	97	96	97	92	100	581	28	
	Li Chuanlin	92	96	96	99	99	95	577	14	
	Liu Yadong	98	96	96	99	98	98	585	22	
2nd place, silver medalist(s)	South Korea (KOR)	285	291	288	293	292	293	1742	54	
	Hong Seong-hwan	95	96	96	98	96	96	577	16	
	Jang Dae-kyu	94	97	96	96	98	98	579	17	
	Park Byung-taek	96	98	96	99	98	99	586	21	
3rd place, bronze medalist(s)	North Korea (PRK)	290	286	294	287	287	290	1734	48	
	Kim Chol-rim	94	96	97	96	97	95	575	17	
	Kim Jong-su	98	95	99	94	97	99	582	19	
	Ryu Myong-yon	98	95	98	97	93	96	577	12	
4	Vietnam (VIE)	289	293	290	291	289	279	1731	62	
	Hà Minh Thành	95	97	94	96	97	99	578	19	
	Hoàng Xuân Vinh	97	99	99	99	97	86	577	20	
	Nguyễn Mạnh Tường	97	97	97	96	95	94	576	23	
5	India (IND)	291	284	293	282	285	291	1726	52	
	Vijay Kumar	97	95	98	98	97	98	583	17	
	Harpreet Singh	97	94	96	91	89	96	563	18	
	Omkar Singh	97	95	99	93	99	97	580	17	
6	Japan (JPN)	280	287	290	288	290	289	1724	44	
	Teruyoshi Akiyama	92	95	95	99	98	95	574	14	
	Kojiro Horimizu	95	96	97	95	97	98	578	14	
	Susumu Kobayashi	93	96	98	94	95	96	572	16	
7	Thailand (THA)	281	284	287	286	287	295	1720	47	
	Prakarn Karndee	91	94	95	97	97	98	572	16	
	Pongpol Kulchairattana	95	96	95	98	96	100	580	18	
	Opas Ruengpanyawut	95	94	97	91	94	97	568	13	
8	Singapore (SIN)	280	283	289	294	282	291	1719	41	
	Gai Bin	95	98	97	98	93	98	579	14	
	On Shaw Ming	88	88	95	97	96	95	559	9	
	Poh Lip Meng	97	97	97	99	93	98	581	18	
9	Iran (IRI)	282	289	283	264	291	294	1703	47	
	Mohammad Ahmadi	94	97	96	75	97	98	557	15	
	Ebrahim Barkhordari	96	96	95	95	98	98	578	17	
	Reza Karimpour	92	96	92	94	96	98	568	15	
10	Hong Kong (HKG)	289	285	283	283	279	282	1701	36	
	Li Hao Jian	97	97	94	96	97	92	573	16	
	Wong Fai	98	95	94	94	91	95	567	12	
	Yang Joe Tsi	94	93	95	93	91	95	561	8	
11	Saudi Arabia (KSA)	285	279	286	271	281	280	1682	42	
	Mohammed Al-Amri	96	95	93	94	96	97	571	17	
	Safar Al-Dosari	94	92	95	79	96	86	542	14	
	Mohammed Al-Saeed	95	92	98	98	89	97	569	11	
12	Macau (MAC)	281	278	282	273	262	275	1651	31	
	Manuel de Jesus Cheom	92	92	94	93	80	88	539	9	
	Chio Hong Chi	95	96	96	93	92	96	568	16	
	Leong Chi Kin	94	90	92	87	90	91	544	6	
