= Shooting at the 2010 Asian Games – Men's 25 metre standard pistol =

Men's 25 metre standard pistol at the 2010 Asian Games
- Venue: Aoti Shooting Range
- Dates: 17 November 2010
- Competitors: 40 from 16 nations

Medalists
gold medal	Hong Seong-hwan	South Korea
silver medal	Kim Jong-su	North Korea
bronze medal	Jin Yongde	China

The men's 25 metre standard pistol competition at the 2010 Asian Games in Guangzhou, China was held on 17 November at the Aoti Shooting Range.

== Schedule ==
All times are China Standard Time (UTC+08:00)

Date	Time	Event
Wednesday, 17 November 2010	09:00	Final

== Records ==
Prior to this competition, the existing world, Asian and Games records were as follows.

World Record	Erich Buljung (USA)	584	Caracas, Venezuela	20 August 1983
Asian Record	Liu Guohui (CHN)	580	Kuala Lumpur, Malaysia	17 February 2004
Games Record	Opas Ruengpanyawut (THA)	579	Busan, South Korea	8 October 2002

== Results ==
Legend

- DNS — Did not start

Rank	Athlete	150 Sec		20 Sec		10 Sec		Total	Xs	S-off	Notes
Rank	Athlete	1	2	1	2	1	2	Total	Xs	S-off	Notes
1st place, gold medalist(s)	Hong Seong-hwan (KOR)	97	97	96	98	95	92	575	20		
2nd place, silver medalist(s)	Kim Jong-su (PRK)	99	100	97	96	89	92	573	14		
3rd place, bronze medalist(s)	Jin Yongde (CHN)	97	97	96	96	91	93	570	16	48	
4	Prakarn Karndee (THA)	95	96	96	95	96	92	570	17	47	
5	Liu Yadong (CHN)	97	96	98	96	87	96	570	16	46	
6	Jang Dae-kyu (KOR)	95	99	93	95	93	95	570	12	46	
7	Samaresh Jung (IND)	96	98	93	96	92	94	569	13		
8	Li Chuanlin (CHN)	97	95	92	97	94	92	567	15		
9	Ebrahim Barkhordari (IRI)	98	97	91	95	93	92	566	14		
10	Vladimir Issachenko (KAZ)	96	99	95	93	89	94	566	13		
11	Nathaniel Padilla (PHI)	92	95	93	95	97	93	565	5		
12	Hwang Yoon-sam (KOR)	96	95	97	92	93	90	563	11		
13	Nguyễn Mạnh Tường (VIE)	94	97	89	96	92	93	561	9		
14	Pruet Sriyaphan (THA)	95	94	90	94	90	97	560	14		
15	Kim Chol-rim (PRK)	95	93	94	92	93	93	560	12		
16	Gai Bin (SIN)	95	95	91	94	95	90	560	12		
17	Wong Fai (HKG)	97	97	96	91	91	87	559	14		
18	Ryu Myong-yon (PRK)	96	98	93	92	87	91	557	11		
19	Vyacheslav Podlesniy (KAZ)	96	93	96	89	87	93	554	11		
20	Poh Lip Meng (SIN)	94	96	92	93	89	88	552	16		
21	Bùi Quang Nam (VIE)	95	93	90	92	90	92	552	9		
22	Pemba Tamang (IND)	94	94	94	93	89	86	550	8		
23	C. K. Chaudhary (IND)	94	91	97	93	92	82	549	10		
24	Mohammad Ahmadi (IRI)	94	98	89	93	85	90	549	9		
25	Sergey Babikov (TJK)	94	94	89	93	89	90	549	8		
26	Ashban Sulaiman (BRN)	92	93	92	95	89	87	548	5		
27	Hasli Izwan (MAS)	94	94	85	93	90	91	547	8		
28	Phạm Anh Đạt (VIE)	95	92	92	92	88	87	546	9		
29	Rashid Yunusmetov (KAZ)	95	95	93	91	89	83	546	9		
30	Chio Hong Chi (MAC)	90	91	92	91	90	90	544	9		
31	Yang Joe Tsi (HKG)	94	93	87	88	93	89	544	7		
32	Li Hao Jian (HKG)	88	92	90	90	90	93	543	9		
33	Khalid Ahmed Mohamed (BRN)	94	95	91	92	84	86	542	3		
34	Hafiz Adzha (MAS)	89	87	89	94	94	87	540	9		
35	Reza Karimpour (IRI)	89	93	91	88	90	85	536	4		
36	Manuel de Jesus Cheom (MAC)	91	92	88	91	76	90	528	2		
37	On Shaw Ming (SIN)	90	88	89	91	87	82	527	8		
38	Vorapol Kulchairattana (THA)	90	93	88	88	81	80	520	5		
39	Leong Chi Kin (MAC)	88	96	85	88	72	84	513	8		
—	Vashliin Gantsooj (MGL)							DNS			
