= Ronjan Sodhi =

Indian sport shooter (born 1979)

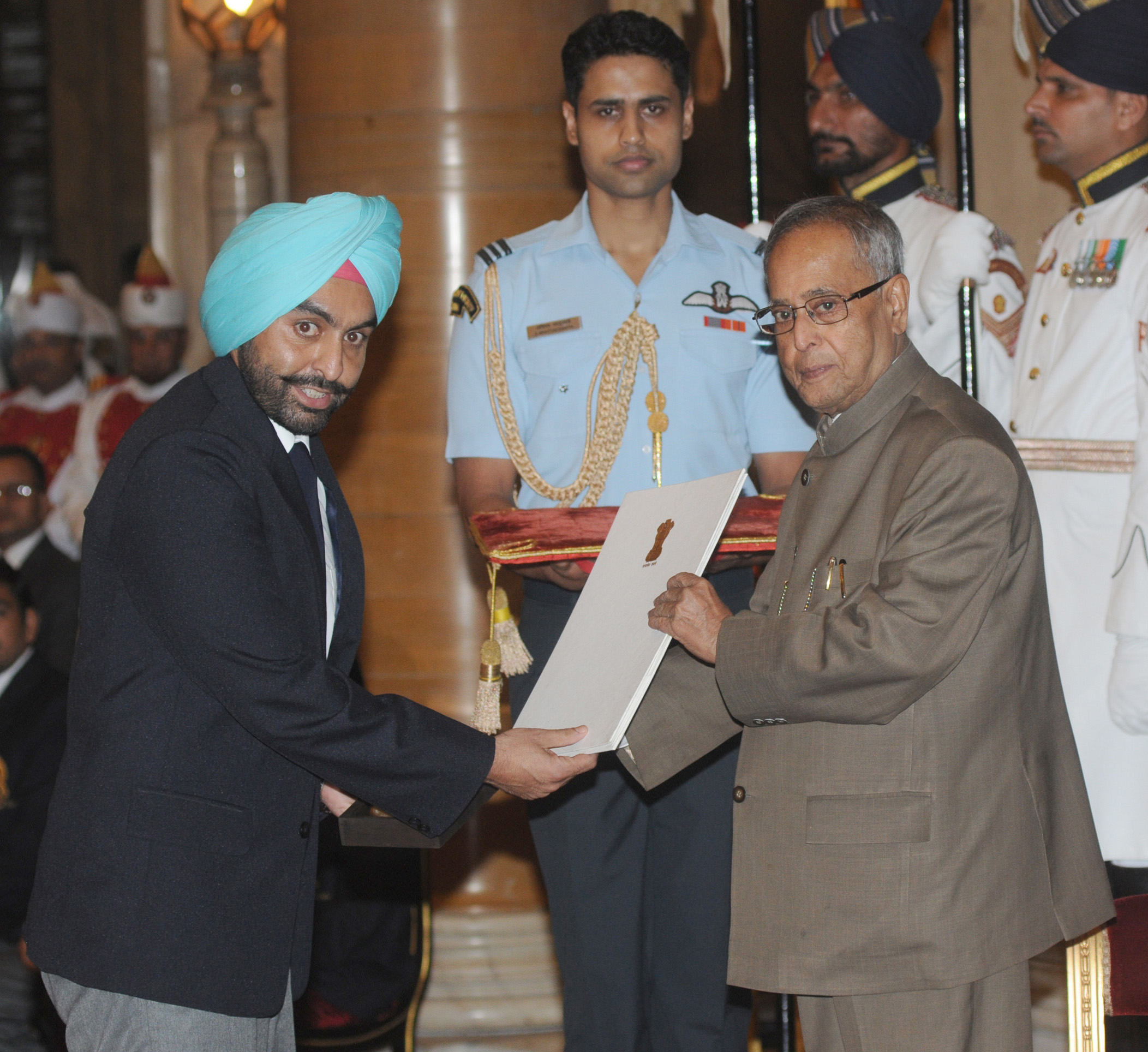
- Sodhi (left) receiving the Rajiv Gandhi Khel Ratna award in 2013

Personal information
- Nationality: India
- Born: 23 October 1979 (age 46) Ferozepur, Punjab, India
- Height: 1.75 m (5 ft 9 in)
- Weight: 87 kg (192 lb)

Sport
- Country: India
- Sport: Sport shooting
- Event: Double trap
- Club: Firozpur District Rifle Association
- Turned pro: 1998
- Coached by: Morrad A. Khan; Marcello Dradi

Achievements and titles
- Highest world ranking: 1
Medal record
Men's shooting
Representing India
ISSF World Cup Final
Gold medal – first place	2010 İzmir	Doubletrap
Gold medal – first place	2011 Al Ain	Doubletrap
Silver medal – second place	2012 Maribor	Doubletrap
Asian Games
Gold medal – first place	2010 Guangzhou	Doubletrap
Bronze medal – third place	2010 Guangzhou	Men's Doubletrap Team
Asian Championships
Bronze medal – third place	2012 Doha	Double trap team
Asian Shotgun Championships
Gold medal – first place	2009 Almaty	Double trap
Gold medal – first place	2009 Almaty	Double trap team
Silver medal – second place	2012 Patiala	Double trap team
Commonwealth Games
Silver medal – second place	2010 New Delhi	Double trap
Silver medal – second place	2010 New Delhi	Double trap pairs

Ronjan Sodhi (born 23 October 1979 in Ferozepur, Punjab, India) is an Indian Double trap shooter. He won two silver medals at the 2010 Commonwealth Games and a gold medal at the 2010 Asian Games. In 2011, he became first Indian to successfully defend a World Cup title. He is also a recipient of the Arjuna Award and Rajiv Gandhi Khel Ratna award (2013).

== Career ==
=== 2010 Lonato ISSF World Cup ===
Ronjan Sodhi shot a perfect 50 hits out of 50 clays in the final and set a new world record with a score of 195 to clinch the coveted Gold Medal in Double Trap event at the 2010 ISSF World Cup held at Lonato, Italy.

=== 2010 Commonwealth Games ===
On 6 October, Sodhi won the Platinum Medal in Men's Double Trap Singles. He along with Asher Noria also won the Silver Medal in Men's Double Trap Pairs, losing to the eventual champions Stevan Walton and Steven Scott by one point.

=== 2010 Asian Games ===
Sodhi scored a total of 186 and thus, managed to win the Gold Medal in Men's Double Trap Event at the Asian Games 2010. He also won the bronze medal in the Men's Double Trap Team.

=== 2011 Beijing ISSF World Cup ===
Sodhi scored a total of 183 hits (144 in the qualifications, and 41 hits in the final) and won the Silver Medal in 2011 ISSF World Cup held at Beijing, China, thus earning an Olympic Quota for India.

=== 2011 Maribor ISSF World Cup ===
Sodhi earned a Bronze Medal at 2011 ISSF World Cup held at Maribor, Slovenia.

=== ISSF World Rankings ===
Sodhi became the only Indian marksman to grab the top spot in the latest ISSF World Rankings. Ronjan, who was earlier ranked second behind American Joshua Richmond by three points, attained the summit by virtue of his bronze medal-winning feat at the World Cup earlier in July in Maribor, Slovenia.

=== 2011 Al Ain ISSF World Cup ===
Sodhi won the Gold Medal at the 2011 ISSF World Cup held at Al Ain, United Arab Emirates on 4 October 2011. Hu Binuyuan of China came second.

=== 2012 London Olympics ===
Sodhi qualified for the men's double trap event at the 2012 London Olympics after winning a silver medal in the event at the 2011 ISFF World Cup held at Beijing. At Olympics after a promising start, this Indian shooter failed to make it to the finals of Double Trap. Sodhi finished 11th with a total of 134 in the qualification. He started off on a good note by fetching the total of 48 in the first round of the qualification stage topping the list with three other shooters. After the end of second round, his total of 92 out of 100 placed him on the 6th position which was still good for one to make into the finals. In the third and final round, he started off well but couldn't finish and was unable to handle the pressure scoring only 2 points in the last 6 with a total of 42.
