= Heena Sidhu =

Indian sport shooter

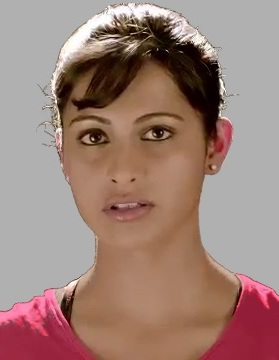

Personal information
- Nationality: India
- Citizenship: Indian
- Born: 29 August 1989 (age 37) Ludhiana, Punjab, India
- Education: Bachelor of Dental Surgery; Yadavindra Public School, Patiala; Gian Sagar Dental College.
- Occupation: Sport shooter
- Height: 163 cm (5 ft 4 in) (As of April 2013)
- Weight: 50.5 kg (111 lb) (As of April 2013)
- Spouse: Ronak Pandit (m. 2013)

Sport
- Rank: No.1 (7 April 2014)
Medal record
Women's shooting
Representing India
World Cup
Gold medal – first place	2013 Germany	10 m air pistol
Gold medal – first place	2017 New Delhi	10 m air pistol mixed team
Silver medal – second place	2009 Beijing	10 m air pistol
Silver medal – second place	2014 Fort Benning	10 m air pistol
Asian Games
Silver medal – second place	2010 Guangzhou	10 m air pistol team
Bronze medal – third place	2014 Incheon	25 m pistol team
Bronze medal – third place	2018 Jakarta-Palembong	10 m air pistol
Asian Championships
Gold medal – first place	2012 Doha	10 m air pistol team
Gold medal – first place	2015 Kuwait	10 m air pistol
Bronze medal – third place	2007 Kuwait	10 m air pistol
Commonwealth Games
Gold medal – first place	2010 Delhi	10 m air pistol pairs
Gold medal – first place	2018 Gold Coast	25 m pistol
Silver medal – second place	2010 Delhi	10 m Air Pistol
Silver medal – second place	2018 Gold Coast	10 m Air Pistol
Commonwealth Championships
Gold medal – first place	2017 Brisbane	10 m air pistol

Heena Sidhu (born 29 August 1989) is an Indian sport shooter. On 7 April 2014, Sidhu became the first Indian pistol shooter to reach number one in world rankings by the International Shooting Sport Federation. In 2013, Sidhu became the first Indian pistol shooter to win a gold medal in an ISSF World Cup finals when she won the 10-metre air pistol event. In 2014, Sidhu was the World record holder in the 10-metre air pistol event with a final score of 203.8. Sidhu is right handed and is right eye dominant.

== Personal life ==
In 2013, Sidhu received a Bachelor of Dental Surgery. Sidhu's father was a national sports shooter. Her brother is also a shooter in the 10 metre air pistol event. Sidhu's uncle is a gunsmith and gun customizer. On 7 February 2013, Sidhu married Ronak Pandit, also a pistol shooter who also acts as her coach. She has a daughter named Reyah. Sidhu resides in Goregaon, Mumbai.

== Career ==
Sidhu began shooting in 2006, participating in the national junior and senior teams. She was a member of the Patiala Club. She began shooting to aid her admission into dental school.

In 2009, Sidhu won a silver medal at the ISSF World Cup in Beijing. She won first place in the women's 10 m air pistol event at the national championship in Kerala.

Sidhu, with Annu Raj Singh and Sonia Rai, won a silver medal in the Women's 10 m air pistol team event at the 2010 Asian Games in Guangzhou, China. With Annu Raj Singh scoring 375 points and Sidhu scoring 384 points, Sidhu and Singh won a gold medal in the women's pairs 10 metre air pistol at the 2010 Commonwealth Games. In the singles event, Sidhu won a silver medal.

Sidhu was a member of the Indian team to the 2012 Summer Olympics in London. She competed in the women's 10 metre air pistol event, finishing twelfth in the qualification round. Sidhu was part of the official London Olympic Games film entitled First: The Story of the London 2012 Olympic Games. The film, written, produced and directed by Caroline Rowland followed a dozen first-time Olympic athletes as they prepared to compete in London.

In 2013, Sidhu won the gold medal at the ISSF World Cup Finals in Munich, Germany. Sidhu defeated the world champion Zorana Arunovic of Serbia and the previous winner, Olena Kostevych of Ukraine with 203.8 points, which gave her a 5-point lead at the end of the event.

In the 2014 Indian National Shooting trials, Sidhu won by 0.1 point over Rahi Sarnobat in the women's air pistol event.

In 2016, Sidhu qualified for the 2016 Summer Olympics in Rio de Janeiro in the women's 10 metre air pistol and the women's 25 metre pistol events. She finished fourteenth in the women's 10 metre air pistol and twentieth in the women's 25 metre pistol qualifying rounds.

In 2017, Sidhu won gold medal in women's 10 metre air pistol event at the Commonwealth shooting championships in Brisbane.

In 2016, Sidhu pulled out of the Asian Air Gun Championships in Tehran because Iran made the wearing of the hijab mandatory for female participants.

At the 2018 Commonwealth Games, Sidhu won a silver medal in the women's 10 metre air pistol event, and a gold medal in the women's 25 metre air pistol event. She broke the Commonwealth Games record of 38 in winning the gold medal.

== Awards ==
On 28 August 2014, Sidhu was conferred the Arjuna Award.
