= Ip Pui Yi =

Hong Kong sport shooter

Ip Pui Yi (Chinese: 葉珮兒; pinyin: Yè Pèi'ér; Jyutping: jip^{6} pui^{3} ji^{4}; born November 28, 1978) is a Hong Kong female sport shooter. At the 2012 Summer Olympics, she competed in the Women's 10 metre air pistol.

== Biography and career ==
Studied at Carmel Alison Lam Foundation Secondary School in his early years. He has joined the Hong Kong Shooting Team since 2004, He has represented Hong Kong in the East Asian Games, Asian Games, Asian Championships and World Championships.

The women's 10m air pistol in the Summer Olympics shooting competition became the second Hong Kong women's representative, to participate in the Olympic shooting after Lu Jiaqi at the 2004 Summer Olympics.
