= Liu Yingzi =

Chinese sport shooter (born 1971)

Personal information
- Nationality: Chinese
- Born: Liu Yingzi; January 27, 1971 (age 55) Xiangyin
- Occupation: Shooter
Medal record
Women's shooting
Representing China
Asian Championships
Gold medal – first place	2007 Kuwait City	Trap team
Gold medal – first place	2015 Kuwait City	Trap team
Silver medal – second place	2012 Doha	Trap team
Silver medal – second place	2019 Doha	Trap team
Bronze medal – third place	2015 Kuwait City	Trap
Asian Shotgun Championships
Gold medal – first place	2019 Almaty	Trap team
Bronze medal – third place	2019 Almaty	Trap
Bronze medal – third place	2019 Almaty	Mixed trap team

Liu Yingzi (born 27 January 1971 in Xiangyin, Yueyang, Hunan) is a female Chinese sports shooter, who competed for Team China at the 2008 and 2012 Summer Olympics.

== Major performances ==
- 1997/2001 National Games - 2nd double trap;
- 2005 World Cup - 2nd double trap;
- 2007 World Cup Final -3rd double trap;
- 2007 World Championships - 1st double trap
