= Kang Gee-eun =

South Korean sport shooter

Kang Gee-Eun
Personal information
- Nationality: South Korea
- Born: 15 October 1990 (age 35) Seoul, South Korea
- Height: 1.63 m (5 ft 4 in)
- Weight: 55 kg (121 lb)

Korean name
- Hangul: 강지은
- RR: Gang Jieun
- MR: Kang Chiŭn

Sport
- Sport: Shooting
- Events: Trap, double trap
- Club: Korea Telecom Shooting Team
- Coached by: Song Nam-Jun
Medal record
Women's shooting
Representing South Korea
Asian Championships
| Gold medal – first place | 2012 Doha | Trap |
| Silver medal – second place | 2015 Kuwait City | Trap team |
Asian Shotgun Championships
| Silver medal – second place | 2017 Astana | Mixed trap team |

Kang Gee-eun (Korean: 강지은; born October 15, 1990, in Seoul) is a South Korean sport shooter. She beat World Cup champion Yang Huan of China and two-time Olympian Yukie Nakayama of Japan for the gold medal in the women's trap at the 2012 Asian Shooting Championships in Doha, Qatar, accumulating a score of 93 clay pigeons. Kang is also a member of Korea Telecom Shooting Team, and is coached and trained by Song Nam-Jun.

Kang represented South Korea at the 2012 Summer Olympics in London, where she competed in the women's trap. Kang scored a total of 62 targets in the qualifying rounds by one point ahead of India's Shagun Chowdhary, finishing only in nineteenth place.
