= Juma bin Dalmook Al Maktoum =

Prince of Dubai, Emirati sport shooter

Sheikh Juma bin Dalmook Al Maktoum
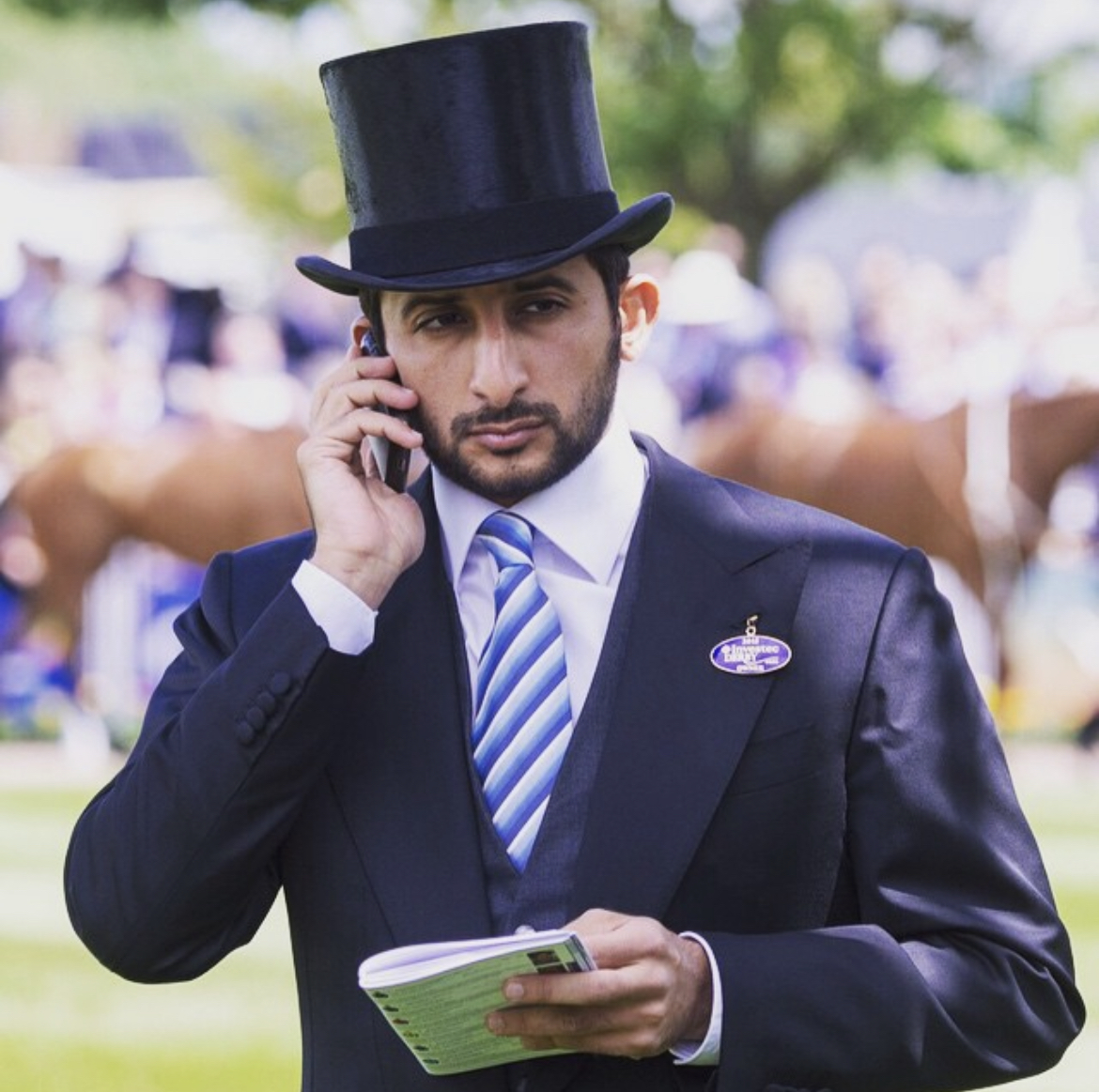

Personal information
- Born: 23 December 1984 (age 41) Dubai
- Other interests: Equestrian
- Spouse: Camélia El Bishry (m. 2013)
- Issue: 3
- Father: Dalmook bin Juma Al Maktoum

Sport
- Sport: Shooting
- Events: Trap, double trap
- Coached by: Ahmed Al Maktoum
Medal record
Representing United Arab Emirates
Asian Games
Silver medal – second place	2010 Guangzhou	Double trap
Bronze medal – third place	2014 Incheon	Double trap
Asian Championships
Gold medal – first place	2012 Doha	Double trap
Gold medal – first place	2012 Doha	Double trap team
Asian Shotgun Championships
Gold medal – first place	2012 Patiala	Double trap
Gold medal – first place	2012 Patiala	Double trap team
Silver medal – second place	2009 Almaty	Double trap team
Bronze medal – third place	2016 Abu Dhabi	Double trap team

Sheikh Juma bin Dalmook Al Maktoum (Arabic: جمعة بن دلموك آل مكتوم; born 23 December 1984) is a member of the ruling family of Dubai, and an Emirati sport shooter.

== Biography ==
Juma Al Maktoum is also an owner of thoroughbred racehorses. His silks are blue and yellow. He participated in the double trap event at the 2012 Summer Olympics.

Sheikh Juma is a grandson of Sheikh Juma bin Maktoum Al Maktoum.
