= Pan Qiang =

Chinese sport shooter (born 1985)

Personal information
- Born: 21 January 1985 (age 41)

Sport
- Sport: Sports shooting
Medal record
Men's shooting
Representing China
Asian Championships
Gold medal – first place	2007 Kuwait City	Double trap
Gold medal – first place	2007 Kuwait City	Double trap team
Asian Shotgun Championships
Gold medal – first place	2013 Almaty	Double trap
Silver medal – second place	2011 Kuala Lumpur	Double trap team
Bronze medal – third place	2013 Almaty	Double trap team

Pan Qiang (born 21 January 1985) is a Chinese sports shooter. He competed in the men's double trap event at the 2016 Summer Olympics.
