= On Shaw Ming =

Singaporean sport shooter (born 1977)

On Shaw Ming (born 7 May 1977) is a former Singaporean sport shooter who won a gold medal at the 2006 Commonwealth Games in Melbourne, Australia. He finished in a three-way tie with favourite Samaresh Jung of India and Gregory Yelavich of New Zealand on 578 points.

On made his mark as the champion at the Asean Army Rifle Meet in 2004, 2005, and 2006. Then, national shooter and army mate Poh Lip Meng invited him to take part in the Singapore Shooting Association's monthly shoot. He made the national training squad and then the national team.
