= Mashfi Al-Mutairi =

Kuwaiti sports shooter (born 1973)

Personal information
- Full name: Mashfi Al-Mutairi
- Nationality: Kuwait
- Born: 19 July 1973 (age 53) Kuwait City, Kuwait
- Height: 1.67 m (5 ft 5 1/2 in)
- Weight: 80 kg (176 lb)

Sport
- Sport: Shooting
- Event: Double trap (DT150)
- Club: Kuwait City Shooting Club
- Coached by: Mirco Cenci
Medal record
Men's shooting
Representing Kuwait
Asian Games
Bronze medal – third place	1998 Bangkok	DT150
Asian Championships
Silver medal – second place	2012 Doha	Double trap team
Bronze medal – third place	2007 Kuwait City	Double trap team

Mashfi Al-Mutairi (Arabic: مشفي المطيري; born July 19, 1973, in Kuwait City) is a Kuwaiti sport shooter. He won a bronze medal in double trap shooting at the 1998 Asian Games in Bangkok, Thailand, and was eventually selected to compete for the Kuwaiti team in two editions of the Olympic Games (2000 and 2004). Al-Mutairi is a member of the Kuwait City Shooting Club, where he trains full-time under Italian-born coach and 1996 Olympian Mirco Cenci.

Al-Mutairi's Olympic debut came at the 2000 Summer Olympics in Sydney, where he shot 134 out of 150 hits to force a two-way tie for tenth place with Finland's Raimo Kauppila in the men's double trap, just five targets away from the final cutoff.

At the 2004 Summer Olympics in Athens, Al-Mutairi qualified for his second Kuwaiti team in the men's double trap, after having achieved a minimum qualifying score of 137 from his second-place finish at the Asian Championships in Kuala Lumpur, Malaysia. Al-Mutairi marked a score of 131 out of 150 targets to finish in twelfth from a field of twenty-five shooters in the qualifying phase, failing to advance to the final round.
