= Lee Bo-na =

South Korean sport shooter

- Korean name
- Hangul: 이보나
- Hanja: 李保那
- RR: I Bona
- MR: I Pona

Lee Bo-na
Medal record

Women's shooting

Representing South Korea

Olympic Games
Silver medal – second place	2004 Athens	double trap
Bronze medal – third place	2004 Athens	trap

Asian Championships
Silver medal – second place	2015 Kuwait City	Trap team
Silver medal – second place	2023 Changwon	Trap team
Silver medal – second place	2023 Changwon	Mixed trap team

Lee Bo-Na (Korean: 이보나; born July 22, 1981) is a female South Korean sports shooter who competed in the 2004 Summer Olympics where she won two medals: silver (double trap) and bronze (trap).

She won the silver medal in the women's double trap competition and the bronze medal in the women's trap competition.
