= Asher Noria =

Indian sport shooter

- Born: 20 November 1992 (age 34); Hyderabad, India
- Occupation: Rifle shooting

Asher Noria (born 20 November 1992) is an Indian shooter. He has won several national and international medals for India. He is the only shooter in the world who has won the double trap event of the International Shooting Junior World Cup for two consecutive years.

== Career ==
=== Early career (2005–2006) ===
Asher Noria is the son of Gusti Jall Noria, a former double trap specialist from India. He is the younger brother of Youhan Noria, an ex-National shooter. He picked up shooting from his father at a very young age. His mother Mita Noria and father supported him by being there with him when he participated at competitions. Having come from a shooting family, shooting skills came naturally to Noria. As an 11-year-old in 2005, Asher Noria participated in the double trap event. He was first seen at a shooting championship in Hyderabad. Six time Olympian, Juan Giha, saw a lot of promise in Noria at such a young age.

Although Noria originally started as a trap shooter, he switched to double trap owing to his success in it. Noria trained for five months under the aegis of Ronjan Sodhi. Noria trains for physical fitness using team games, cardio routines and running around Hyderabad's Kasu Brahmananda Reddy National Park.

=== Success (2007 – present) ===
Noria represented Andhra Pradesh in national level competitions winning several medals. From 2007 onwards, he started winning medals for India in international competitions.

Noria's foray into international competitions began with Cyprus World Championships where he finished sixth. At the Kuwait Asian Shooting Championships, he met Ahmed bin Hasher Al Maktoum, his idol and the gold medal winner in the double trap event at the 2004 Summer Olympics. Noria found this meeting to be inspirational and holds it close to his heart.

At the 2008 Singapore Open, Noria won his first international gold medal. His next gold medal came 2 months later at the 2008 Commonwealth Youth Games, where he bettered the national record set by Rajyavardhan Rathore at the 2004 Summer Olympics. Noria won the gold medal at the 2009 International Junior World Cup Shooting Championship in the same category. At the 2010 World Championships in Munich, Noria won the gold medal in junior double trap event. In the process, he also created a new national record in the junior category. In appreciation of his performance in Munich, the Sahara Group felicitated Noria with a cash prize of ₹300,000 (US$3,200).

==== 2010 Commonwealth Games ====
Because Rajyavardhan Rathore chose to protest the selection process, Noria was selected to represent India at the 2010 Commonwealth Games. He was chosen for all the shotgun events along with Ronjan Sodhi and Manavjit Singh Sandhu. In the run-up to the Games, India's coach said that Noria was one of the young shooters to watch out for. However, Noria felt that it would be a challenge for him to match Rathore.

In the men's double trap pairs event, Noria paired with Ranjan Sodhi to win the silver medal. In the double trap individual event, Noria missed the bronze medal narrowly. Sodhi, who won the silver medal, commended Noria's first international performance in the men's category.

== Education ==
Noria finished his schooling at Hyderabad Public School. He was the school head-boy. In August 2010, he enrolled at the Georgia Institute of Technology. Despite moving to the United States, Noria clarified that he will continue the sport for India.
