= Galina Belyayeva (sport shooter, born 1951) =

Russian-Kazakhstani sport shooter

Personal information
- Full name: Galina Vasilyevna Belyayeva
- Nationality: Russia; Kazakhstan
- Born: 12 December 1951 (age 74) Sverdlovsk, Russian SFSR, Soviet Union
- Height: 1.57 m (5 ft 2 in)
- Weight: 68 kg (150 lb)

Sport
- Sport: Shooting
- Events: 10 m air pistol (AP40); 25 m pistol (SP)
- Coached by: Sadulla Yunusmetova
Medal record
Women's shooting
Representing Kazakhstan
World Championships
Bronze medal – third place	1994 Milan	AP40
Asian Championships
Bronze medal – third place	2012 Doha	25 m pistol team

Galina Vasilyevna Belyayeva (Russian: Галина Васильевна Беляева; born 12 December 1951 in Sverdlovsk, Russian SFSR) is a Russian-Kazakhstani sport shooter. She has competed for Kazakhstan in pistol shooting at two Olympics (1996, and 2004), and has been close to an Olympic medal in 1996 (finishing sixth in the air pistol). Outside her Olympic career, Belyayeva has produced a career tally of six medals in a major competition: a bronze in air pistol at the 1994 World Championships in Milan, Italy and five more (one gold, two silver, and two bronze) at numerous meets of the ISSF World Cup series.

Belyayeva holds a dual citizenship to compete for Kazakhstan, and also trains under head coach Sadulla Yunusmetova for the Kazakhstan national shooting team. Belyayev currently resides with her husband and 1996 Olympic silver medalist Sergey Belyayev.

Belyayeva's Olympic debut came as part of the inaugural Kazakh team, along with her husband Sergey, at the 1996 Summer Olympics in Atlanta. From there, she put up a brilliant aim at 481.7 points to chase her fellow markswoman Yuliya Bondareva for sixth place in the air pistol. Belyayeva also competed in the sport pistol, but failed to reach the final after finishing in a distant thirtieth from a field of thirty-seven shooters with a total score of 567 (286 in precision and 281 in the rapid-fire).

After losing her 2000 bid to Bondareva and newcomer Dina Aspandiyarova (who later represented Australia at the succeeding Games), Belyayeva returned from an eight-year-absence to compete for her second Kazakh team, as the oldest athlete (aged 51), in pistol shooting at the 2004 Summer Olympics in Athens. She managed to get a minimum qualifying score of 580 in the sport pistol to gain an Olympic quota place for Kazakhstan, following an outside-final finish at the Worlds in Lahti, Finland two years earlier. In the 10 m air pistol, held on the third day of the Games, Belyayeva fired a frustrating 373 out of a possible 400 to obtain a thirty-third position in a field of forty-one shooters. In her signature event, the 25 m pistol, Belyayeva upgraded her unsteady air pistol feat to shoot a substantial 292 in precision stage and 285 in rapid-fire for a total score of 577 points, finishing in an unprecedented tie with four other shooters for thirteenth place.
