= Jo Yong-suk =

North Korean sport shooter (born 1988)

Personal information
- National team: North Korea
- Born: September 5, 1988 (age 37)
- Height: 163 cm (5 ft 4 in)
- Weight: 65 kg (143 lb)

Sport
- Sport: Sport shooting
- Event(s): 10 metre air pistol, 25 metre pistol
- Team: Amnokgang National Defense Sports Team
Medal record
Women's shooting
Representing North Korea
Asian Championships
Bronze medal – third place	2007 Kuwait City	10 m air pistol team

Korean name
- Hangul: 조영숙
- RR: Jo Yeongsuk
- MR: Cho Yŏngsuk
- Updated on 8 August 2016

Jo Yong-suk (Korean: 조영숙; pronounced [tso.jʌŋ.suk̚]; born September 5, 1988) is a North Korean sport shooter. She represents the Amnokgang National Defense Sports Team.

Jo is from Sariwon, North Hwanghae Province, but now lives in Pyongyang.

At the 2012 Summer Olympics, she competed in the Women's 10 metre air pistol and achieved 10th position out of 49 athletes. She also competed in the 25 metre pistol, finishing in 7th. She competed in the same events at the 2016 Olympics, finishing in 12th in the 10 metre air pistol and 7th in the 25 metre pistol.
