= Annu Raj Singh =

Indian sport shooter (born 1984)

Personal information
- Nationality: Indian
- Born: 17 February 1984 (age 42) Aligarh, India
- Height: 1.64 m (5 ft 5 in)
- Weight: 53 kg (117 lb)

Sport
- Country: India
- Sport: Shooting sport
- Club: Pune University / Gun for Glory Academy
Medal record
Women's shooting
Representing India
Asian Championships
Gold medal – first place	2012 Doha	10 m air pistol team
Bronze medal – third place	2012 Doha	10 m air pistol
Bronze medal – third place	2019 Doha	10 m air pistol team
Commonwealth Games
Gold medal – first place	2010 Delhi	10 m air pistol pairs
Commonwealth Championships
Gold medal – first place	2010 Delhi	25 m pistol pairs
Silver medal – second place	2010 Delhi	10 m air pistol
Silver medal – second place	2010 Delhi	10 m air pistol badge
Silver medal – second place	2010 Delhi	25 m pistol
Bronze medal – third place	2017 Brisbane	25 m pistol

Annu Raj Singh (born 17 February 1984) is an Indian shooter from Aligarh. She won the gold medal in women's pairs 10 metre air pistol with Heena Sidhu at the 2010 Commonwealth Games. At the 2012 Summer Olympics, she competed in both the 10 metre air pistol and the 25 metre pistol.

At the 2019 South Asian games, she won the gold medal in women's 25 metre pistol.

== Early life ==
She was educated at Our Lady of Fatima High School, Aligarh and Aligarh Muslim University.
