= Tao Luna =

Chinese sport shooter (born 1974)

Medal record

Women's shooting

Representing China

Olympic Games
Gold medal – first place	2000 Sydney	10 m air pistol
Silver medal – second place	2000 Sydney	25 m pistol

Asian Championships
Silver medal – second place	2012 Doha	10 m air pistol team

Tao Luna (Chinese: 陶璐娜; pinyin: Táo Lùnà; born February 11, 1974, in Shanghai) is a female Chinese sports shooter who competed in the 2000 Summer Olympics and in the 2004 Summer Olympics. In 2000, she won the gold medal in the women's 10 metre air pistol competition and the silver medal in the women's 25 metre pistol competition.

== Olympic results ==
Event	2000	2004
25 metre pistol	(silver) Silver; 590+99.8	—
10 metre air pistol	(gold) Gold; 390+98.2	38th 366

== Records ==
Current world records held in 25 m Pistol
Women (ISSF)	Qualification	594	Diana Iorgova (BUL); Tao Luna (CHN)	May 31, 1994; August 23, 2002	Milan (ITA); Munich (GER)
Women (ISSF)	Teams	1768	China (Chen, Li, Tao)	October 4, 2002	Busan (KOR)
