= Su Yuling =

Chinese sport shooter (born 1989)

Su Yuling (born 24 April 1989, in Changle, Fujian) is a Chinese female sport shooter. At the 2012 Summer Olympics, she competed in the Women's 10 metre air pistol finishing in 6th place.
