= Lee Ho-lim =

South Korean sport shooter

Personal information
- Nationality: South Korea
- Born: 22 July 1988 (age 37) Seoul, South Korea
- Height: 1.68 m (5 ft 6 in)
- Weight: 53 kg (117 lb)

Korean name
- Hangul: 이호림
- RR: I Horim
- MR: I Horim

Sport
- Sport: Shooting
- Event(s): 10 m air pistol (AP40); 25 m pistol (SP)
- Club: Korea National Sport University
- Coached by: Jang Kap-seok
Medal record
Women's shooting
Representing South Korea
Asian Games
Bronze medal – third place	2010 Guangzhou	SP
Asian Championships
Silver medal – second place	2007 Kuwait City	10 m air pistol
Silver medal – second place	2007 Kuwait City	10 m air pistol team

Lee Ho-lim (Korean: 이호림; born July 22, 1988) is a South Korean sport shooter. She won a gold medal in the women's air pistol at the 2005 ISSF World Cup in Milan, Italy, accumulating a score of 485.9 targets. She also captured a bronze medal for the women's 25 m sport pistol at the 2010 Asian Games in Guangzhou, China, with a score of 782.4 points. She was born in Seoul, South Korea.

Lee represented South Korea at the 2008 Summer Olympics in Beijing, where she competed in two pistol shooting events. She placed twenty-first out of forty-four shooters in the women's 10 m air pistol, with a total score of 380 points. Three days later, Lee competed for her second event, 25 m pistol, where she was able to shoot 289 targets in the precision stage, and 291 in the rapid fire, for a total score of 580 points, finishing only in seventeenth place.
