= United Arab Emirates at the 2010 Asian Games =

- IOC code: UAE
- NOC: United Arab Emirates National Olympic Committee

in Guangzhou
- Competitors: 95 in 17 sports
- Officials: 60
- Medals Ranked 28th: Gold 0 Silver 4 Bronze 1 Total 5

Asian Games appearances (overview)
- 1978; 1982; 1986; 1990; 1994; 1998; 2002; 2006; 2010; 2014; 2018; 2022; 2026

The United Arab Emirates participated at the 16th Asian Games in Guangzhou, China.

== Medalists ==
Medal	Name	Sport	Event	Date
Silver	Shaikh Juma Dalmook Al Maktoum	Shooting	Men's Double Trap	21 November
Silver	Sheikh Rashid bin Ahmed Al Maktoum; Sheikha Latifah Al Maktoum; Sheikh Majid bin Abdullah Al Qassimi; Ahmed Al Junaibi	Equestrian	Jumping Team	22 November
Silver	Sheikha Latifah Al Maktoum	Equestrian	Jumping Individual	24 November
Silver	Men's Team	Football	Men's	25 November
Bronze	Omar Juma Alsalfa	Athletics	Men's 200m	25 November
