= Kim Byung-hee =

South Korean sport shooter (born 1982)

Kim Byung-Hee
Personal information
- Born: 9 March 1982 (age 44) South Jeolla Province, South Korea

Korean name
- Hangul: 김병희
- RR: Gim Byeonghui
- MR: Kim Pyŏnghŭi
Medal record
Women's shooting
Representing South Korea
Asian Championships
Silver medal – second place	2007 Kuwait City	10 m air pistol team
Bronze medal – third place	2007 Kuwait City	25 m pistol team

Kim Byung-Hee (born 9 March 1982) is a South Korean female sport shooter. She competed in shooting at the 2010 Asian Games, winning a gold medal in the women's 10 metre air pistol. She went on to compete in the women's 10 metre air pistol at the 2012 Summer Olympics.
