= Tanyaporn Prucksakorn =

Thai sport shooter (born 1990)

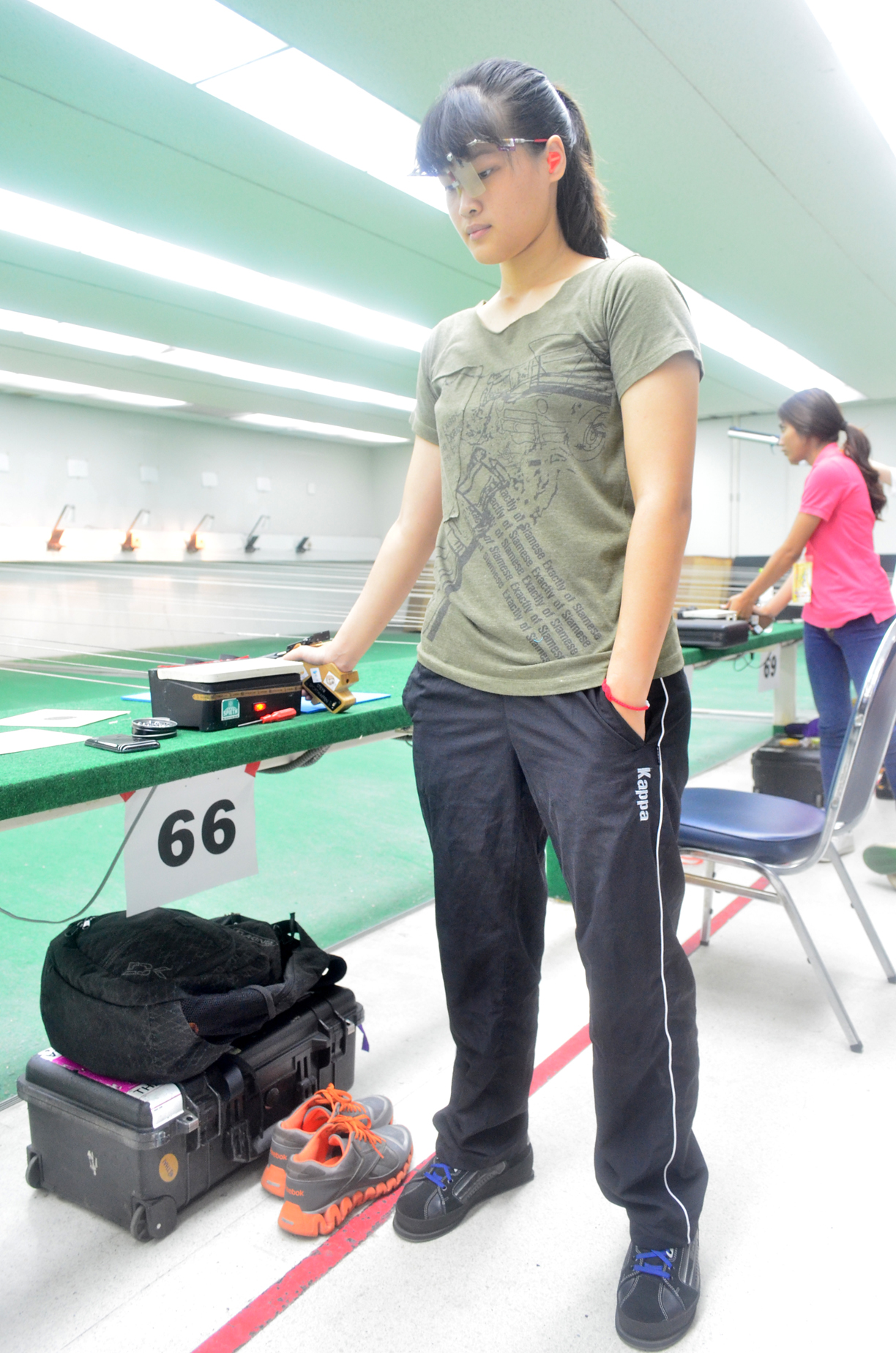

Personal information
- Nationality: Thai
- Born: 8 January 1990 (age 36) Dallas, Texas, United States
- Weight: 66 kg (146 lb)

Sport
- Sport: Shooting
Medal record
Women's shooting
Representing Thailand
ISSF World Cup
Silver medal – second place	2012 Beijing	10m Air Pistol
Silver medal – second place	2015 Munich	25 metre pistol
Asian Championships
Bronze medal – third place	2019 Doha	25 metre pistol team
Asian Airgun Championships
Gold medal – first place	2021 Shymkent	10 m air pistol team
Gold medal – first place	2021 Shymkent	10 m air pistol mixed team
Silver medal – second place	2021 Shymkent	10 m air pistol
Southeast Asian Games
Gold medal – first place	2009 Vientiane	10 m air pistol
Gold medal – first place	2009 Vientiane	10 m air pistol team
Gold medal – first place	2009 Vientiane	25 m pistol
Gold medal – first place	2009 Vientiane	25 m pistol team
Gold medal – first place	2015 Singapore	10 m air pistol team
Gold medal – first place	2015 Singapore	25 m pistol team
Bronze medal – third place	2011 Palembang	10 m air pistol

Tanyaporn Prucksakorn (Thai: ธันยพร พฤกษากร; RTGS: Thanyaphon Phrueksakon) is a Thai sport shooter who has competed at the 2008, 2012 and 2016 Summer Olympics. At all three Olympics, she competed in the 10 m air pistol and 25 m pistol events. She has been a competitive shooter since 2003, winning two World Cup silver medals, both at the Munich event (40 m air pistol in 2012 and 25 m pistol in 2015).
