= Yoko Inada =

Japanese sport shooter (born 1969)

Yoko Inada (born 6 September 1969) is a Japanese sport shooter who competed in the 1996 Summer Olympics, in the 2000 Summer Olympics, and in the 2004 Summer Olympics.
