= Guo Wenjun =

Chinese sport shooter

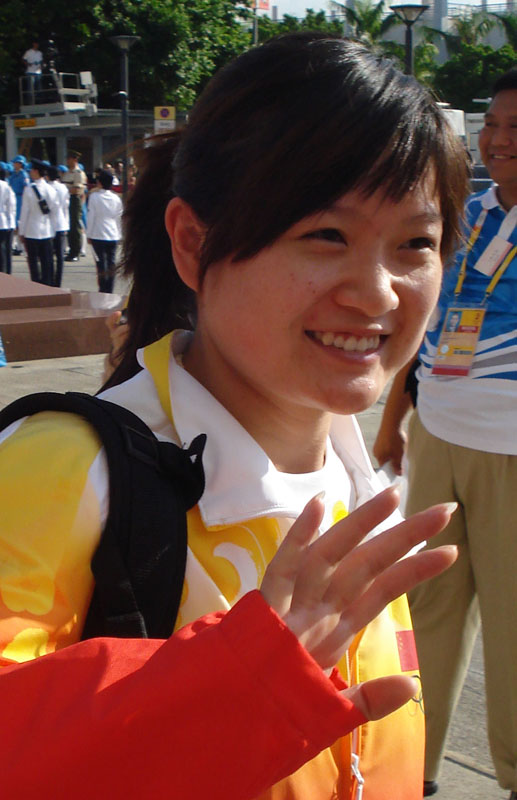

Personal information
- Nationality: China
- Born: June 22, 1984 (age 42) Xi'an, Shaanxi
- Height: 1.68 m (5 ft 6 in)
- Weight: 65 kg (143 lb)

Sport
- Sport: Shooting
- Event(s): AP40, SP
Medal record
Women's shooting
Representing China
Event	1st	2nd	3rd
Olympic Games	2	-	-
World Championships	-	-	1
World Cup Final	-	1	1
Asian Games	-	1	-
Olympic Games
Gold medal – first place	2008 Beijing	10 m Air Pistol
Gold medal – first place	2012 London	10 m Air Pistol
Asian Championships
Gold medal – first place	2007 Kuwait City	10 m air pistol
Gold medal – first place	2007 Kuwait City	10 m air pistol team
Gold medal – first place	2007 Kuwait City	25 m pistol team
Bronze medal – third place	2015 Kuwait City	10 m air pistol team

Guo Wenjun (Chinese: 郭文珺; pinyin: Guō Wénjùn, born June 22, 1984, in Xi'an, Shaanxi) is a female Chinese sport shooter who won three of the four gold medals in women's pistol shooting during the European part of the 2008 ISSF World Cup. She won gold in the women's 10 metre air pistol at the 2008 Summer Olympics and 2012 Summer Olympics. She is the only woman to have defended women's 10 metre air pistol title at the Olympic Games.

== See also ==
- China at the 2012 Summer Olympics
