= Yukari Konishi =

Japanese sport shooter

Personal information
- Full name: Yukari KONISHI (小西ゆかり)
- Nationality: Japan
- Height: 162 cm (5 ft 4 in)
- Weight: 55 kg (121 lb)
- Website: https://ameblo.jp/yk-rupi/

Sport
- Country: Japan
- Sport: Shooting
- Events: Air pistol, Sport pistol
- Club: Aska Traffic Inc.
Medal record
Asian Games
Silver medal – second place	2010 Guangzhou	25 m pistol
ISSF World Cup
Bronze medal – third place	2003 Zagreb	25 m pistol
Asian Airgun Championships
Gold medal – first place	2017 Wakō	10 m air pistol

Yukari Konishi (小西ゆかり, Yukari KONISHI; born 11 January 1979) is a Japanese female sport shooter. At the 2004 Summer Olympics, she competed in the women's 25 metre pistol. At the 2012 Summer Olympics, she competed in the Women's 10 metre air pistol and the Women's 25 metre pistol.
