= Zauresh Baibussinova =

Kazakhstani sport shooter (born 1970)

Personal information
- Nationality: Kazakhstan
- Born: 13 July 1970 (age 55) Alma-Ata, Kazakh SSR, Soviet Union
- Height: 1.55 m (5 ft 1 in)
- Weight: 65 kg (143 lb)

Sport
- Sport: Shooting
- Event(s): 10 m air pistol (AP40); 25 m pistol (SP)
- Club: Dynamo Almaty
Medal record
Women's shooting
Representing Kazakhstan
Asian Championships
Bronze medal – third place	2012 Doha	25 m pistol team

Zauresh Baibussinova (Kazakh: Зауреш Мухамедовна Байбусинова, Zaureş Baibusinova; born July 13, 1970, in Alma-Ata) is a Kazakhstani sport shooter. At age thirty-eight, Baibussinova made her official debut for the 2008 Summer Olympics in Beijing, where she competed in two pistol shooting events. She placed thirteenth out of forty-four shooters in the women's 10 m air pistol, with a total score of 382 points. Three days later, Baibussinova competed for her second event, 25 m pistol, where she was able to shoot 281 targets in the precision stage, and 290 in the rapid fire, for a total score of 571 points, finishing only in thirty-first place.
