= Yuliya Drishlyuk =

Kazakhstani sports shooter (born 1975)

Medal record

Women's shooting

Representing Kazakhstan

Asian Games
Gold medal – first place	2010 Guangzhou	SP Team
Silver medal – second place	1998 Bangkok	SP
Silver medal – second place	1998 Bangkok	AP40 Team
Silver medal – second place	1998 Bangkok	SP Team
Silver medal – second place	2002 Busan	AP40 Team
Bronze medal – third place	2002 Busan	SP Team

Asian Championships
Bronze medal – third place	2012 Doha	25 m pistol team

Yuliya Drishlyuk (Юлия Владиславовна Дришлюк, née Bondareva, born 3 January 1975 in Pavlodar, Kazakh SSR, Soviet Union) is a female Kazakhstani sports shooter.
