= Qatar at the 2010 Asian Games =

- IOC code: QAT
- NOC: Qatar Olympic Committee

in Guangzhou
- Competitors: 318 in 25 sports
- Officials: 160
- Medals Ranked 19th: Gold 4 Silver 5 Bronze 7 Total 16

Asian Games appearances (overview)
- 1978; 1982; 1986; 1990; 1994; 1998; 2002; 2006; 2010; 2014; 2018; 2022; 2026

Qatar participated in the 16th Asian Games in Guangzhou, China from 12 to 27 November 2010.

== Medalists ==
Medal	Name	Sport	Event	Date
Gold	Femi Ogunode	Athletics	Men's 400m	22 November
Gold	Femi Ogunode	Athletics	Men's 200m	25 November
Gold	Mutaz Essa Barshim	Athletics	Men's High Jump	23 November
Gold	Qatar	Shooting	Men's Skeet Team	24 November
Silver	James Kwalia	Athletics	Men's 5000m	21 November
Silver	Thamer Kamal Ali	Athletics	Men's 3000m Steeplechase	23 November
Silver	Essa Ismail Rashed	Athletics	Men's 10,000m	26 November
Silver	Masoud Saleh Hamad	Shooting	Men's Skeet	24 November
Bronze	Felix Kibore	Athletics	Men's 5000m	21 November
Bronze	Musaab Abdelrahman Bala	Athletics	Men's 800m	25 November
Bronze	Rashidahmed Al Mannai	Athletics	Men's High Jump	23 November
Bronze	Mubarak Hassan Shami	Athletics	Men's Marathon	27 November
Bronze	Fahad Alemadi; Monsour Al Hajri; Mubarak Al Muraikh	Bowling	Men's Trios	20 November
Bronze	Hamad Ali Al Marri	Shooting	Men's Double Trap	21 November
Bronze	Nasser Al-Attiyah	Shooting	Men's Skeet	24 November
