= 2008 ISSF World Cup Final (rifle and pistol) =

The 2008 ISSF World Cup Final in rifle and pistol events was held 3–5 November 2008 in Bangkok, Thailand, as the conclusion of the 2008 World Cup season. The final was held in Bangkok for the second consecutive time, and third overall.

There were twelve spots in each of the ten events. The defending champion from the 2007 World Cup Final and all medalists of the 2008 Olympics in Beijing qualified automatically for Bangkok. The remaining eight qualified through a special point-awarding system based on their best performance during the World Cup season, skipping past automatic qualifiers. Not counting the defending champion and the Olympic medalists, there was a maximum of two shooters per event from the same country.

The qualification system awarded a win with 15 points, a silver medal with 10, a bronze medal with 8, a fourth place with 5, a fifth with 4, a sixth with 3, a seventh with 2 and an eighth place with 1 point. It also gave out points for qualification scores within a certain range from the current world record: from 1 point for fourteen points off the record, to 15 points for equalling or raising it.

== Schedule and winners ==
All times are local (UTC+7).

Day	Event	Final time	Winner
3 November (Monday)	Men's 50 metre rifle prone	11:30	Warren Potent (AUS)
3 November (Monday)	Men's 50 metre pistol	12:30	Jin Jong-oh (KOR)
3 November (Monday)	Women's 25 metre pistol	13:30	Munkhbayar Dorjsuren (GER)
4 November (Tuesday)	Men's 25 metre rapid fire pistol	14:30	Alexey Klimov (RUS)
4 November (Tuesday)	Women's 50 metre rifle three positions	15:30	Sonja Pfeilschifter (GER)
4 November (Tuesday)	Men's 50 metre rifle three positions	16:30	Matthew Emmons (USA)
5 November (Wednesday)	Women's 10 metre air rifle	10:30	Wu Liuxi (CHN)
5 November (Wednesday)	Men's 10 metre air rifle	11:30	Gagan Narang (IND)
5 November (Wednesday)	Women's 10 metre air pistol	12:30	Ren Jie (CHN)
5 November (Wednesday)	Men's 10 metre air pistol	13:30	Oleg Omelchuk (UKR)

== Men's 50 metre rifle three positions ==
=== Qualification ===
Shooter	Event	Rank points	Score points	Total
Matthew Emmons (USA)	WCF 2007	Defending champion		
Qiu Jian (CHN)	OG Beijing	Olympic gold medalist		
Jury Sukhorukov (UKR)	OG Beijing	Olympic silver medalist		
Rajmond Debevec (SLO)	OG Beijing	Olympic bronze medalist		
Jia Zhanbo (CHN)	WC Munich	15	9	24
Artur Ayvazyan (UKR)	WC Milan	15	4	19
Josselin Henry (FRA)	WC Beijing	15	2	17
Thomas Farnik (AUT)	WC Rio de Janeiro	15	0	15
Sergei Kovalenko (RUS)	WC Munich	8	4	12
Artem Khadjibekov (RUS)	WC Munich	10	1	11
Maik Eckhardt (GER)	WC Milan	10	0	10
Vebjørn Berg (NOR)	WC Rio de Janeiro	8	0	8

=== Results ===
Rank	Shooter	Prone	Stand	Kneel	Qual	Notes	Final	Total
1st place, gold medalist(s)	Matthew Emmons (USA)	394	388	389	1171		98.0	1269.0
2nd place, silver medalist(s)	Artur Ayvazyan (UKR)	399	380	387	1166		99.7	1265.7
3rd place, bronze medalist(s)	Jia Zhanbo (CHN)	399	379	389	1167		97.6	1264.6
4	Rajmond Debevec (SLO)	395	380	393	1168		95.8	1263.8
5	Vebjørn Berg (NOR)	400	374	391	1165		97.2	1262.2
6	Maik Eckhardt (GER)	397	378	392	1167		95.1	1262.1
7	Thomas Farnik (AUT)	398	373	391	1162		98.3	1260.3
8	Jury Sukhorukov (UKR)	389	376	395	1160		99.5	1259.5
9	Sergei Kovalenko (RUS)	395	376	387	1158			
10	Qiu Jian (CHN)	395	373	386	1154			
11	Josselin Henry (FRA)	389	369	386	1144			
	Artem Khadjibekov (RUS)					DNS		

DNS Did not start

== Men's 50 metre rifle prone ==
=== Qualification ===
Shooter	Event	Rank points	Score points	Total
Sergei Martynov (BLR)	WCF 2007	Defending champion		
Artur Ayvazyan (UKR)	OG Beijing	Olympic gold medalist		
Matthew Emmons (USA)	OG Beijing	Olympic silver medalist		
Warren Potent (AUS)	OG Beijing	Olympic bronze medalist		
Stevan Pletikosić (SRB)	WC Rio de Janeiro	15	13	28
Torben Grimmel (DEN)	WC Milan	15	12	27
Thomas Tamas (USA)	WC Beijing	10	14	24
Neil Stirton (GBR)	WC Munich	10	14	24
Michael McPhail (USA)	WC Beijing	8	13	21
Toshikazu Yamashita (JPN)	WC Milan	10	11	21
Jury Sukhorukov (UKR)	WC Beijing	5	13	18
Tomáš Jeřábek (CZE)	WC Munich	5	12	17

Tamas did not participate and was replaced by Valérian Sauveplane.

=== Results ===
Rank	Shooter	Qual	Final	Total
1st place, gold medalist(s)	Warren Potent (AUS)	598	104.2	702.2
2nd place, silver medalist(s)	Matthew Emmons (USA)	596	104.7	700.7
3rd place, bronze medalist(s)	Toshikazu Yamashita (JPN)	595	104.9	699.9
4	Michael McPhail (USA)	595	104.4	699.4
5	Artur Ayvazyan (UKR)	595	104.1	699.1
6	Valérian Sauveplane (FRA)	595	103.0	698.0
7	Tomáš Jeřábek (CZE)	593	103.4	696.4
8	Jury Sukhorukov (UKR)	594	101.5	695.5
9	Torben Grimmel (DEN)	592		
10	Stevan Pletikosić (SRB)	591		
11	Sergei Martynov (BLR)	590		
12	Neil Stirton (GBR)	586		

== Men's 10 metre air rifle ==
=== Qualification ===
Shooter	Event	Rank points	Score points	Total
Zhu Qinan (CHN)	WCF 2007	Defending champion		
Abhinav Bindra (IND)	OG Beijing	Olympic gold medalist		
Henri Häkkinen (FIN)	OG Beijing	Olympic bronze medalist		
Alin George Moldoveanu (ROU)	WC Munich	15	14	29
Péter Sidi (HUN)	WC Rio de Janeiro	15	13	28
Matthew Emmons (USA)	WC Beijing	10	14	24
Cao Yifei (CHN)	WC Milan	10	11	21
Gagan Narang (IND)	WC Beijing	8	12	20
Thomas Farnik (AUT)	WC Munich	8	12	20
Nemanja Mirosavljev (SRB)	WC Rio de Janeiro	8	11	19
Artur Ayvazyan (UKR)	WC Milan	5	12	17

Bindra did not participate.

=== Results ===
Rank	Shooter	Qual	Notes	Final	Total	Notes
1st place, gold medalist(s)	Gagan Narang (IND)	600	EWR	103.5	703.5	WR
2nd place, silver medalist(s)	Matthew Emmons (USA)	598		104.5	702.5	
3rd place, bronze medalist(s)	Zhu Qinan (CHN)	599		103.3	702.3	
4	Henri Häkkinen (FIN)	599		102.9	701.9	
5	Péter Sidi (HUN)	599		102.3	701.3	
6	Nemanja Mirosavljev (SRB)	597		103.9	700.9	
7	Artur Ayvazyan (UKR)	596		104.2	700.2	
8	Thomas Farnik (AUT)	597		101.0	698.0	
9	Cao Yifei (CHN)	591				
10	Alin George Moldoveanu (ROU)	591				

EWR Equalled world record – WR World record

== Men's 50 metre pistol ==
=== Qualification ===
Shooter	Event	Rank points	Score points	Total
Lin Zhongzai (CHN)	WCF 2007	Defending champion		
Jin Jong-oh (KOR)	OG Beijing	Olympic gold medalist		
Tan Zongliang (CHN)	OG Beijing	Olympic silver medalist		
Vladimir Isakov (RUS)	OG Beijing	Olympic bronze medalist		
Boris Kokorev (RUS)	WC Milan	15	6	21
Pang Wei (CHN)	WC Munich	10	5	15
Tomoyuki Matsuda (JPN)	WC Munich	15	0	15
Oleg Omelchuk (UKR)	WC Rio de Janeiro	15	0	15
Daryl Szarenski (USA)	WC Beijing	8	4	12
Rashid Yunusmetov (KAZ)	WC Beijing	10	0	10
Francesco Bruno (ITA)	WC Rio de Janeiro	10	0	10
João Costa (POR)	WC Milan	8	1	9

Tan did not participate.

=== Results ===
Rank	Shooter	Qual	Final	Total
1st place, gold medalist(s)	Jin Jong-oh (KOR)	570	97.2	667.2
2nd place, silver medalist(s)	Tomoyuki Matsuda (JPN)	566	99.5	665.5
3rd place, bronze medalist(s)	Vladimir Isakov (RUS)	562	98.5	660.5
4	João Costa (POR)	560	98.5	658.5
5	Pang Wei (CHN)	559	94.2	653.2
6	Francesco Bruno (ITA)	562	91.0	653.0
7	Oleg Omelchuk (UKR)	555	95.0	650.0
8	Rashid Yunusmetov (KAZ)	551	92.4	643.4
9	Lin Zhongzai (CHN)	549		
10	Boris Kokorev (RUS)	548		
11	Daryl Szarenski (USA)	544		

== Men's 25 metre rapid fire pistol ==
=== Qualification ===
Shooter	Event	Rank points	Score points	Total
Ralf Schumann (GER)	WCF 2007	Defending champion		
Oleksandr Petriv (UKR)	OG Beijing	Olympic gold medalist		
Christian Reitz (GER)	OG Beijing	Olympic bronze medalist		
Sergei Alifirenko (RUS)	WC Beijing	15	10	25
Leuris Pupo (CUB)	WC Rio de Janeiro	10	11	21
Iulian Raicea (ROU)	WC Rio de Janeiro	8	9	17
Ivan Stoukachev (RUS)	WC Milan	8	7	15
Zhang Penghui (CHN)	WC Beijing	8	6	14
René Vogn (DEN)	WC Munich	4	7	11
Jorge Llames (ESP)	WC Milan	5	6	11
Josef Fiala (CZE)	WC Munich	5	6	11

Alifirenko, Pupo and Raicea did not participate and were replaced by Cha Sang-jun, Alexey Klimov and Taras Magmet.

=== Results ===
Rank	Shooter	1st	2nd	Qual	Shoot-off	Final	Total
1st place, gold medalist(s)	Alexey Klimov (RUS)	292	293	585		204.7	789.7
2nd place, silver medalist(s)	Christian Reitz (GER)	295	295	590		197.9	787.9
3rd place, bronze medalist(s)	Ralf Schumann (GER)	290	292	582		195.0	777.0
4	Zhang Penghui (CHN)	289	291	580		196.1	776.1
5	Oleksandr Petriv (UKR)	289	286	575	46	197.8	772.8
6	René Vogn (DEN)	288	289	577		190.7	767.7
7	Jorge Llames (ESP)	289	286	575	42		
8	Cha Sang-jun (KOR)	289	285	574			
9	Josef Fiala (CZE)	283	288	571			
10	Taras Magmet (UKR)	283	285	568			
11	Ivan Stoukachev (RUS)	275	288	563			

== Men's 10 metre air pistol ==
=== Qualification ===
Shooter	Event	Rank points	Score points	Total
Vladimir Isakov (RUS)	WCF 2007	Defending champion		
Pang Wei (CHN)	OG Beijing	Olympic gold medalist		
Jin Jong-oh (KOR)	OG Beijing	Olympic silver medalist		
Jason Turner (USA)	OG Beijing	Olympic bronze medalist		
Lin Zhongzai (CHN)	WC Munich	15	12	27
Franck Dumoulin (FRA)	WC Beijing	15	7	22
Mauro Badaracchi (ITA)	WC Rio de Janeiro	15	6	21
Dilshod Mukhtarov (UZB)	WC Milan	10	9	19
Vladimir Gontcharov (RUS)	WC Beijing	10	7	17
Boris Kokorev (RUS)	WC Milan	8	8	16
Oleg Omelchuk (UKR)	WC Rio de Janeiro	10	6	16
Norayr Bakhtamyan (ARM)	WC Beijing	5	8	13

=== Results ===
Rank	Shooter	Qual	Final	Total
1st place, gold medalist(s)	Oleg Omelchuk (UKR)	585	102.4	687.4
2nd place, silver medalist(s)	Norayr Bakhtamyan (ARM)	588	97.2	685.2
3rd place, bronze medalist(s)	Vladimir Isakov (RUS)	584	100.1	684.1
4	Franck Dumoulin (FRA)	581	102.7	683.7
5	Jin Jong-oh (KOR)	581	102.0	683.0
6	Mauro Badaracchi (ITA)	581	100.1	681.1
7	Jason Turner (USA)	581	96.9	677.9
8	Dilshod Mukhtarov (UZB)	581	96.2	677.2
9	Boris Kokorev (RUS)	579		
10	Vladimir Gontcharov (RUS)	578		
11	Lin Zhongzai (CHN)	578		
12	Pang Wei (CHN)	577		

== Women's 50 metre rifle three positions ==
=== Qualification ===
Shooter	Event	Rank points	Score points	Total
Yin Wen (CHN)	WCF 2007	Defending champion		
Du Li (CHN)	OG Beijing	Olympic gold medalist		
Kateřina Emmons (CZE)	OG Beijing	Olympic silver medalist		
Eglis Yaima Cruz (CUB)	OG Beijing	Olympic bronze medalist		
Sonja Pfeilschifter (GER)	WC Milan	15	8	23
Jamie Beyerle (USA)	WC Milan	10	8	18
Kristina Vestveit (NOR)	WC Milan	8	9	17
Snježana Pejčić (CRO)	WC Munich	10	7	17
Morgan Hicks (USA)	WC Rio de Janeiro	15	2	17
Adéla Sýkorová (CZE)	WC Munich	8	5	13
Lioubov Galkina (RUS)	WC Beijing	8	4	12
Olga Dovgun (KAZ)	WC Milan	4	6	10

Emmons did not participate. In addition, Thanyalak Chotphibunsin entered as the host country's wild card.

=== Results ===
Rank	Shooter	Prone	Stand	Kneel	Qual	Final	Total	Shoot-off
1st place, gold medalist(s)	Sonja Pfeilschifter (GER)	199	195	196	590	98.8	688.8	
2nd place, silver medalist(s)	Olga Dovgun (KAZ)	200	196	193	589	99.3	688.3	
3rd place, bronze medalist(s)	Lioubov Galkina (RUS)	199	193	194	586	97.5	683.5	10.4
4	Yin Wen (CHN)	197	195	194	586	97.5	683.5	9.8
5	Jamie Beyerle (USA)	198	188	194	580	100.3	680.3	
6	Snježana Pejčić (CRO)	197	193	190	580	99.6	679.6	
7	Eglis Yaima Cruz (CUB)	199	186	193	578	97.3	675.3	
8	Morgan Hicks (USA)	196	190	192	578	93.7	671.7	
9	Du Li (CHN)	199	189	190	578			
10	Thanyalak Chotphibunsin (THA)	197	185	194	576			
11	Kristina Vestveit (NOR)	195	189	191	575			
12	Adéla Sýkorová (CZE)	195	187	188	570			

== Women's 10 metre air rifle ==
=== Qualification ===
Shooter	Event	Rank points	Score points	Total
Du Li (CHN)	WCF 2007	Defending champion		
Kateřina Emmons (CZE)	OG Beijing	Olympic gold medalist		
Lioubov Galkina (RUS)	OG Beijing	Olympic silver medalist		
Snježana Pejčić (CRO)	OG Beijing	Olympic bronze medalist		
Sonja Pfeilschifter (GER)	WC Milan	15	15	30
Barbara Lechner (GER)	WC Rio de Janeiro	15	11	26
Wu Liuxi (CHN)	WC Milan	8	13	21
Agnieszka Staron (POL)	WC Munich	8	13	21
Kim Eun-hye (KOR)	WC Rio de Janeiro	8	11	19
Olga Dovgun (KAZ)	WC Beijing	4	14	18
Emily Caruso (USA)	WC Munich	4	14	18
Natalia Kalnysh (UKR)	WC Beijing	3	13	16

Emmons and Lechner did not participate, and were replaced by Beate Gauss. In addition, Thanyalak Chotphibunsin entered as the host country's wild card.

=== Results ===
Rank	Shooter	Qual	Notes	Final	Total
1st place, gold medalist(s)	Wu Liuxi (CHN)	398		104.1	502.1
2nd place, silver medalist(s)	Lioubov Galkina (RUS)	400	EWR	101.9	501.9
3rd place, bronze medalist(s)	Du Li (CHN)	396		105.1	501.1
4	Snježana Pejčić (CRO)	397		103.6	500.6
5	Sonja Pfeilschifter (GER)	396		104.5	500.5
6	Natalia Kalnysh (UKR)	396		104.2	500.2
7	Kim Eun-hye (KOR)	395		102.4	497.4
8	Olga Dovgun (KAZ)	395		101.9	496.9
9	Emily Caruso (USA)	395			
10	Agnieszka Staron (POL)	392			
11	Beate Gauss (GER)	391			
12	Thanyalak Chotphibunsin (THA)	387			

EWR Equalled world record

== Women's 25 metre pistol ==
=== Qualification ===
Shooter	Event	Rank points	Score points	Total
Chen Ying (CHN)	WCF 2007	Defending champion		
Otryadyn Gündegmaa (MGL)	OG Beijing	Olympic silver medalist		
Munkhbayar Dorjsuren (GER)	OG Beijing	Olympic bronze medalist		
Guo Wenjun (CHN)	WC Munich	15	9	24
Jasna Šekarić (SRB)	WC Beijing	15	6	21
Mariya Grozdeva (BUL)	WC Rio de Janeiro	15	4	19
Lalita Yauhleuskaya (AUS)	WC Munich	8	7	15
Sławomira Szpek (POL)	WC Munich	10	5	15
Stéphanie Tirode (FRA)	WC Beijing	10	3	13
Tsogbadrakhyn Mönkhzul (MGL)	WC Beijing	8	4	12
Sandra Kolly (SUI)	WC Rio de Janeiro	8	3	11

Kolly did not participate. In addition, Tanyaporn Prucksakorn entered as the host country's wild card.

=== Results ===
Rank	Shooter	Prec	Rapid	Qual	Notes	Final	Total
1st place, gold medalist(s)	Munkhbayar Dorjsuren (GER)	294	296	590		203.1	793.1
2nd place, silver medalist(s)	Stéphanie Tirode (FRA)	294	295	589		203.5	792.5
3rd place, bronze medalist(s)	Mariya Grozdeva (BUL)	288	293	581		206.1	787.1
4	Jasna Šekarić (SRB)	292	292	584		202.2	786.2
5	Otryadyn Gündegmaa (MGL)	284	294	578		206.1	784.1
6	Sławomira Szpek (POL)	286	290	576		206.0	782.0
7	Lalita Yauhleuskaya (AUS)	285	292	577		203.9	780.9
8	Tsogbadrakhyn Mönkzhul (MGL)	286	288	574		205.3	779.3
9	Guo Wenjun (CHN)	291	282	573			
10	Tanyaporn Prucksakorn (THA)	280	280	560			
	Chen Ying (CHN)				DNS		

DNS Did not start

== Women's 10 metre air pistol ==
=== Qualification ===
Shooter	Event	Rank points	Score points	Total
Natalia Paderina (RUS)	WCF 2007	Defending champion		
Guo Wenjun (CHN)	OG Beijing	Olympic gold medalist		
Nino Salukvadze (GEO)	OG Beijing	Olympic bronze medalist		
Sandra Kolly (SUI)	WC Rio de Janeiro	15	9	24
Stéphanie Tirode (FRA)	WC Beijing	15	8	23
Mirosława Sagun-Lewandowska (POL)	WC Munich	10	11	21
Lalita Yauhleuskaya (AUS)	WC Milan	8	9	17
Sonia Franquet (ESP)	WC Rio de Janeiro	10	7	17
Ren Jie (CHN)	WC Beijing	8	8	16
Zsófia Csonka (HUN)	WC Beijing	10	6	16
Tien Chia-chen (TPE)	WC Milan	8	7	15

Paderina, Kolly and Csonka did not participate and were replaced by Michela Suppo. In addition, Tanyaporn Prucksakorn entered as the host country's wild card.

=== Results ===
Rank	Shooter	Qual	Final	Total
1st place, gold medalist(s)	Ren Jie (CHN)	389	99.9	488.9
2nd place, silver medalist(s)	Stéphanie Tirode (FRA)	389	97.5	486.5
3rd place, bronze medalist(s)	Guo Wenjun (CHN)	384	100.6	484.6
4	Nino Salukvadze (GEO)	384	98.0	482.0
5	Michela Suppo (ITA)	382	98.8	480.8
6	Mirosława Sagun-Lewandowska (POL)	383	97.0	480.0
7	Tien Chia-chen (TPE)	379	98.2	477.2
8	Tanyaporn Prucksakorn (THA)	379	96.3	475.3
9	Sonia Franquet (ESP)	378		
10	Lalita Yauhleuskaya (AUS)	376		
