= 2008 ISSF World Cup =

The 2008 ISSF World Cup was the twenty-third annual edition of the ISSF World Cup in the Olympic shooting events, governed by the International Shooting Sport Federation. Four qualification competitions were held in each event, spanning from March to June, and the best shooters qualified for the ISSF World Cup Final, which was carried out in September in Minsk for the shotgun events, and in November in Bangkok for the other events. Apart from those who qualified through the 2008 World Cup competitions, the defending champions and all medalists from the 2008 Summer Olympics were also invited to the final. The host countries were also granted special wild cards.

Following the tradition of previous Olympic years, one of the qualification competitions was held as a pre-Olympic test event at the Beijing Shooting Range Hall and the Beijing Shooting Range Clay Target Field, the upcoming venues for shooting at the 2008 Summer Olympics. As qualification for the Olympics was concluded with the 2007 season, no quota places were at stake during the 2008 World Cup.

== Schedule ==
Competition dates	Venue	Rifle	Pistol	Shotgun	Details
March 23–27	Rio de Janeiro (BRA)	✔	✔		
April 12–20	Beijing (CHN)	✔	✔	✔	
May 4–10	Kerrville (USA)			✔	
May 17–21	Munich (GER)	✔	✔		
May 24–29	Milan (ITA)	✔	✔		
June 4–12	Suhl (GER)			✔	
June 15–21	Belgrade (SRB)			✔	
September 27–30	Minsk (BLR)			✔	2008 ISSF World Cup Final (shotgun)
November 3–5	Bangkok (THA)	✔	✔		2008 ISSF World Cup Final (rifle and pistol)

== Medals by event ==
=== Men's rifle events ===
50 metre rifle three positions			50 metre rifle prone			10 metre air rifle		
Rio de Janeiro (March 27)			Rio de Janeiro (March 25)			Rio de Janeiro (March 23)		
Gold	Thomas Farnik (AUT)	1265.3 (1168)	Gold	Stevan Pletikosić (SRB)	702.9 (598)	Gold	Péter Sidi (HUN)	702.5 (598)
Silver	Maik Eckhardt (GER)	1265.2 (1167)	Silver	Torben Grimmel (DEN)	701.4 (597)	Silver	A. G. Moldoveanu (ROU)	700.7 (598)
Bronze	Vebjørn Berg (NOR)	1265.0 (1166)	Bronze	Warren Potent (AUS)	699.5 (596)	Bronze	Nemanja Mirosavljev (SRB)	698.9 (596)
Beijing (April 20)			Beijing (April 18)			Beijing (April 14)		
Gold	Josselin Henry (FRA)	1268.8 (1173)	Gold	Warren Potent (AUS)	704.8 EWR (599)	Gold	Zhu Qinan (CHN)	700.8 (597)
Silver	Jury Sukhorukov (UKR)	1268.0 (1171)	Silver	Thomas Tamas (USA)	704.3 (599)	Silver	Matthew Emmons (USA)	700.7 (599)
Bronze	Sergei Kovalenko (RUS)	1266.9 (1168)	Bronze	Michael McPhail (USA)	704.1 (598)	Bronze	Gagan Narang (IND)	700.3 (597)
Munich (May 21)			Munich (May 19)^{1}			Munich (May 17)		
Gold	Jia Zhanbo (CHN)	1276.5 (1180)	Gold	Sergei Martynov (BLR)	703.3 (599)	Gold	A. G. Moldoveanu (ROU)	702.0 (599)
Silver	Artem Khadjibekov (RUS)	1272.7 (1172)	Silver	Neil Stirton (GBR)	703.2 (599)	Silver	Zhu Qinan (CHN)	700.6 (597)
Bronze	Sergei Kovalenko (RUS)	1272.1 (1175)	Bronze	Warren Potent (AUS)	702.3 (597)	Bronze	Thomas Farnik (AUT)	699.8 (597)
Milan (May 26)			Milan (May 29)			Milan (May 24)		
Gold	Artur Ayvazyan (UKR)	1275.5 (1175)	Gold	Torben Grimmel (DEN)	701.3 (597)	Gold	Zhu Qinan (CHN)	701.2 (599)
Silver	Maik Eckhardt (GER)	1268.9 (1170)	Silver	Toshikazu Yamashita (JPN)	699.3 (596)	Silver	Cao Yifei (CHN)	700.9 (596)
Bronze	Jia Zhanbo (CHN)	1268.3 (1171)	Bronze	Matthew Emmons (USA)	698.8 (595)	Bronze	Péter Sidi (HUN)	700.3 (596)
Final: Bangkok (November 4; details)			Final: Bangkok (November 3; details)			Final: Bangkok (November 5; details)		
Gold	Matthew Emmons (USA)	1269.0 (1171)	Gold	Warren Potent (AUS)	702.2 (598)	Gold	Gagan Narang (IND)	703.5 WR (600 EWR)
Silver	Artur Ayvazyan (UKR)	1265.7 (1166)	Silver	Matthew Emmons (USA)	700.7 (596)	Silver	Matthew Emmons (USA)	702.5 (598)
Bronze	Jia Zhanbo (CHN)	1264.6 (1167)	Bronze	Toshikazu Yamashita (JPN)	699.9 (595)	Bronze	Zhu Qinan (CHN)	702.3 (599)

^{1} In the elimination round on May 18, Guy Starik (ISR) equalled the world record with a perfect 600.

=== Men's pistol events ===
50 metre pistol			25 metre rapid fire pistol			10 metre air pistol		
Rio de Janeiro (March 25)			Rio de Janeiro (March 26–27)			Rio de Janeiro (March 26)		
Gold	Oleg Omelchuk (UKR)	658.8 (562)	Gold	Christian Reitz (GER)	785.6 (588)	Gold	Mauro Badaracchi (ITA)	684.4 (584)
Silver	Francesco Bruno (ITA)	656.2 (559)	Silver	Leuris Pupo (CUB)	784.0 (587)	Silver	Oleg Omelchuk (UKR)	682.9 (584)
Bronze	Tanyu Kiryakov (BUL)	655.3 (559)	Bronze	Iulian Raicea (ROU)	782.5 (585)	Bronze	Vigilio Fait (ITA)	681.4 (581)
Beijing (April 15)			Beijing (April 18–19)			Beijing (April 13)		
Gold	Lin Zhongzai (CHN)	667.2 (571)	Gold	Sergei Alifirenko (RUS)	786.7 (586)	Gold	Franck Dumoulin (FRA)	683.7 (585)
Silver	Rashid Yunusmetov (KAZ)	666.0 (565)	Silver	Aleksei Klimov (RUS)	780.9 (581)	Silver	Vladimir Gontcharov (RUS)	682.2 (585)
Bronze	Daryl Szarenski (USA)	663.4 (570)	Bronze	Zhang Penghui (CHN)	778.3 (582)	Bronze	Kim Jong Su (PRK)	682.0 (583)
Munich (May 18)			Munich (May 18–19)			Munich (May 20)		
Gold	Tomoyuki Matsuda (JPN)	663.7 (565)	Gold	Ralf Schumann (GER)	790.0 WR (589)	Gold	Lin Zhongzai (CHN)	688.6 (590)
Silver	Pang Wei (CHN)	663.3 (571)	Silver	Christian Reitz (GER)	786.4 (585)	Silver	Leonid Ekimov (RUS)	686.7 (584)
Bronze	Florian Schmidt (GER)	661.2 (565)	Bronze	Leuris Pupo (CUB)	786.0 (584)	Bronze	Vladimir Gontcharov (RUS)	685.6 (586)
Milan (May 29)			Milan (May 27–28)			Milan (May 25)		
Gold	Boris Kokorev (RUS)	667.3 (572)	Gold	Christian Reitz (GER)	794.0 WR (591 EWR)	Gold	Vladimir Isakov (RUS)	686.2 (586)
Silver	Vladimir Isakov (RUS)	666.2 (568)	Silver	Ralf Schumann (GER)	789.7 (590)	Silver	Dilshod Mukhtarov (UZB)	685.7 (587)
Bronze	João Costa (POR)	664.6 (567)	Bronze	Ivan Stoukachev (RUS)	785.2 (583)	Bronze	Boris Kokorev (RUS)	684.9 (586)
Final: Bangkok (November 3; details)			Final: Bangkok (November 4; details)			Final: Bangkok (November 5; details)		
Gold	Jin Jong-oh (KOR)	667.2 (570)	Gold	Aleksei Klimov (RUS)	789.7 (585)	Gold	Oleg Omelchuk (UKR)	687.4 (585)
Silver	Tomoyuki Matsuda (JPN)	665.5 (566)	Silver	Christian Reitz (GER)	787.9 (590)	Silver	Norayr Bakhtamyan (ARM)	685.2 (588)
Bronze	Vladimir Isakov (RUS)	660.5 (562)	Bronze	Ralf Schumann (GER)	777.0 (582)	Bronze	Vladimir Isakov (RUS)	684.1 (584)

=== Men's shotgun events ===
Trap			Double trap			Skeet		
Beijing (April 12–13)			Beijing (April 15)			Beijing (April 19–20)		
Gold	Mário Filipovič (SVK)	142 (118)	Gold	Vasily Mosin (RUS)	191 (145)	Gold	Qu Ridong (CHN)	144 (120)
Silver	Aleksei Alipov (RUS)	140 (119)	Silver	Walton Eller (USA)	188 (140)	Silver	Konstantin Tsuranov (RUS)	143 (120)
Bronze	Bret Erickson (USA)	140 (120)	Bronze	Saif Alshamsy (UAE)	185 (140)	Bronze	Andrea Filippetti (ITA)	143 (120)
Kerrville (May 9–10)			Kerrville (May 7)			Kerrville (May 4–5)		
Gold	Michael Diamond (AUS)	148 EWR (123)	Gold	Håkan Dahlby (SWE)	190 (144)	Gold	Ariel Mauricio Flores (MEX)	147 (122)
Silver	Massimiliano Mola (ITA)	143 (120)	Silver	Richard Faulds (GBR)	189 (142)	Silver	Tore Brovold (NOR)	146 (122)
Bronze	Dominic Grazioli (USA)	143 (123)	Bronze	Jeffrey Holguin (USA)	189 (142)	Bronze	Valerio Luchini (ITA)	144 (120)
Suhl (June 4–6)			Suhl (June 8)			Suhl (June 10–12)		
Gold	Michael Diamond (AUS)	145 (123)	Gold	Richard Faulds (GBR)	193 (147 EWR)	Gold	Vincent Hancock (USA)	147 (123)
Silver	Bret Erickson (USA)	144 (122)	Silver	Hu Binyuan (CHN)	192 (145)	Silver	Anthony Terras (FRA)	145 (120)
Bronze	Aleksei Alipov (RUS)	143 (121)	Bronze	Roland Gerebics (HUN)	189 (144)	Bronze	Ennio Falco (ITA)	144 (120)
Belgrade (June 15–16)			Belgrade (June 18)			Belgrade (June 20–21)		
Gold	Stéphane Clamens (FRA)	144 (122)	Gold	Ronjan Sodhi (IND)	194 EWR (147 EWR)	Gold	Georgios Achilleos (CYP)	149 (124)
Silver	Massimo Fabbrizi (ITA)	144 (121)	Silver	Richard Faulds (GBR)	192 (145)	Silver	Andrea Benelli (ITA)	148 (123)
Bronze	Francesco Amici (SMR)	141 (120)	Bronze	Håkan Dahlby (SWE)	191 (144)	Bronze	Anthony Terras (FRA)	148 (124)
Final: Minsk (September 29–30; details)			Final: Minsk (September 27; details)			Final: Minsk (September 29–30; details)		
Gold	Giovanni Pellielo (ITA)	145 (120)	Gold	Håkan Dahlby (SWE)	191 (144)	Gold	Tore Brovold (NOR)	148 (123)
Silver	Michael Diamond (AUS)	144 (122)	Silver	Hu Binyuan (CHN)	188 (140)	Silver	Vincent Hancock (USA)	147 (123)
Bronze	Aleksei Alipov (RUS)	142 (123)	Bronze	Vasily Mosin (RUS)	188 (143)	Bronze	Jan Sychra (CZE)	144 (121)

=== Women's rifle events ===
50 metre rifle three positions			10 metre air rifle		
Rio de Janeiro (March 28)			Rio de Janeiro (March 24)		
Gold	Morgan Hicks (USA)	677.9 (581)	Gold	Barbara Lechner (GER)	499.3 (396)
Silver	Lidija Mihajlović (SRB)	675.3 (578)	Silver	Beate Gauss (GER)	498.8 (396)
Bronze	Annik Marguet (SUI)	675.1 (579)	Bronze	Kim Eun Hye (KOR)	498.7 (396)
Beijing (April 17)			Beijing (April 12)		
Gold	Du Li (CHN)	692.7 (590)	Gold	Kateřina Emmons (CZE)	504.9 EWR (399)
Silver	Sonja Pfeilschifter (GER)	690.8 (591)	Silver	Sonja Pfeilschifter (GER)	502.4 (398)
Bronze	Lioubov Galkina (RUS)	685.3 (583)	Bronze	Du Li (CHN)	502.2 (399)
Munich (May 20)			Munich (May 17)		
Gold	Sonja Pfeilschifter (GER)	687.0 (586)	Gold	Sonja Pfeilschifter (GER)	503.4 (399)
Silver	Snježana Pejčić (CRO)	684.2 (586)	Silver	Lioubov Galkina (RUS)	502.0 (398)
Bronze	Adéla Sýkorová (CZE)	683.5 (584)	Bronze	Agnieszka Staron (POL)	500.7 (398)
Milan (May 27)			Milan (May 24)		
Gold	Sonja Pfeilschifter (GER)	687.6 (587)	Gold	Sonja Pfeilschifter (GER)	505.0 WR (400 EWR)
Silver	Jamie Beyerle (USA)	685.7 (587)	Silver	Kateřina Emmons (CZE)	503.0 (398)
Bronze	Kristina Vestveit (NOR)	685.3 (588)	Bronze	Wu Liuxi (CHN)	501.8 (398)
Final: Bangkok (November 4; details)			Final: Bangkok (November 5; details)		
Gold	Sonja Pfeilschifter (GER)	688.8 (590)	Gold	Wu Liuxi (CHN)	502.1 (398)
Silver	Olga Dovgun (KAZ)	688.3 (589)	Silver	Lioubov Galkina (RUS)	501.9 (400 EWR)
Bronze	Lioubov Galkina (RUS)	683.5 (586)	Bronze	Du Li (CHN)	501.1 (396)

=== Women's pistol events ===
25 metre pistol			10 metre air pistol		
Rio de Janeiro (March 25–26)			Rio de Janeiro (March 23)		
Gold	Mariya Grozdeva (BUL)	787.0 (583)	Gold	Sandra Kolly (SUI)	484.8 (387)
Silver	Maura Genovesi (ITA)	784.9 (579)	Silver	Sonia Franquet (ESP)	483.0 (385)
Bronze	Sandra Kolly (SUI)	784.0 (582)	Bronze	Michela Suppo (ITA)	480.7 (383)
Beijing (April 16)			Beijing (April 12)		
Gold	Jasna Šekarić (SRB)	784.4 (585)	Gold	Stéphanie Tirode (FRA)	486.3 (386)
Silver	Stéphanie Tirode (FRA)	784.4 (582)	Silver	Zsófia Csonka (HUN)	485.4 (384)
Bronze	Tsogbadrakhyn Mönkhzul (MGL)	783.4 (583)	Bronze	Ren Jie (CHN)	485.1 (386)
Munich (May 17–18)			Munich (May 21)		
Gold	Guo Wenjun (CHN)	789.6 (588)	Gold	Guo Wenjun (CHN)	491.1 (389)
Silver	Sławomira Szpek (POL)	785.7 (584)	Silver	Miroslawa Sagun Lewandowska (POL)	489.9 (389)
Bronze	Lalita Yauhleuskaya (AUS)	785.2 (586)	Bronze	Natalia Paderina (RUS)	485.8 (388)
Milan (May 26–27)			Milan (May 25)		
Gold	Otryadyn Gündegmaa (MGL)	787.9 (583)	Gold	Guo Wenjun (CHN)	491.4 (389)
Silver	Lalita Yauhleuskaya (AUS)	784.7 (582)	Silver	Antoaneta Boneva (BUL)	484.1 (385)
Bronze	Tsogbadrakhyn Mönkhzul (MGL)	783.6 (582)	Bronze	Lalita Yauhleuskaya (AUS)	483.7 (387)
Final: Bangkok (November 3; details)			Final: Bangkok (November 5; details)		
Gold	Munkhbayar Dorjsuren (GER)	793.1 (590)	Gold	Ren Jie (CHN)	488.9 (389)
Silver	Stéphanie Tirode (FRA)	792.5 (589)	Silver	Stéphanie Tirode (FRA)	486.5 (389)
Bronze	Mariya Grozdeva (BUL)	787.1 (581)	Bronze	Guo Wenjun (CHN)	484.6 (384)

=== Women's shotgun events ===
Trap			Skeet		
Beijing (April 14)			Beijing (April 17)		
Gold	Gao E (CHN)	93 (71)	Gold	Wei Ning (CHN)	97 (72)
Silver	Pak Yong Hui (PRK)	90 (69)	Silver	Diana Bacosi (ITA)	94 (70)
Bronze	Irina Laricheva (RUS)	89 (68)	Bronze	Haley Dunn (USA)	94 (70)
Kerrville (May 9)			Kerrville (May 4)		
Gold	Theresa DeWitt (USA)	94 (73)	Gold	Haley Dunn (USA)	97 (73)
Silver	Irina Laricheva (RUS)	91 (72)	Silver	Kim Rhode (USA)	96 (72)
Bronze	Joetta Dement (USA)	91 (70)	Bronze	Connie Smotek (USA)	92 (69)
Suhl (June 4–5)			Suhl (June 10–11)		
Gold	Jessica Rossi (ITA)	94 (72)	Gold	Diana Bacosi (ITA)	95 (72)
Silver	Daniela Del Din (SMR)	93 (73)	Silver	Danka Barteková (SVK)	94 (72)
Bronze	Liu Yingzi (CHN)	92 (70)	Bronze	Chiara Cainero (ITA)	94 (72)
Belgrade (June 15)			Belgrade (June 20)		
Gold	Giulia Iannotti (ITA)	91 (69)	Gold	Andri Eleftheriou (CYP)	94 (73)
Silver	Anita North (GBR)	90 (69)	Silver	Danka Barteková (SVK)	94 (71)
Bronze	Tatiana Barsuk (RUS)	90 (69)	Bronze	Wei Ning (CHN)	94 (72)
Final: Minsk (September 29; details)			Final: Minsk (September 29; details)		
Gold	Irina Laricheva (RUS)	94 (72)	Gold	Andri Eleftheriou (CYP)	95 (73)
Silver	Liu Yingzi (CHN)	92 (71)	Silver	Haley Dunn (USA)	93 (71)
Bronze	Giulia Iannotti (ITA)	90 (69)	Bronze	Katiuscia Spada (ITA)	92 (68)

== Multiple winners ==
=== Five titles ===
- Sonja Pfeilschifter (GER) in 50 metre rifle three positions and 10 metre air rifle

=== Three titles ===
- Guo Wenjun (CHN) in 25 metre pistol and 10 metre air pistol

=== Two titles ===
- Håkan Dahlby (SWE) in double trap
- Michael Diamond (AUS) in trap
- Andri Eleftheriou (CYP) in skeet
- Lin Zhongzai (CHN) in 50 metre pistol and 10 metre air pistol
- Oleg Omelchuk (UKR) in 50 metre pistol and 10 metre air pistol
- Warren Potent (AUS) in 50 metre rifle prone
- Christian Reitz (GER) in 25 metre rapid fire pistol
- Zhu Qinan (CHN) in 10 metre air rifle
