= 2009 ISSF World Cup Final (rifle and pistol) =

The 2009 ISSF World Cup Final in rifle and pistol events was scheduled to be held 26–28 October 2009 in Wuxi, China, as the conclusion of the 2009 World Cup season. It will be the first time the final is held in China.

There are ten spots in each of the ten events. The defending champion from the 2008 World Cup Final and the reigning Olympic champions qualify automatically. The remaining eight qualify through a special point-awarding system based on their best performance during the World Cup season, skipping past automatic qualifiers. Not counting the defending and Olympic champions, there will be a maximum of two shooters per event from the same country.

The qualification system awards a win with 15 points, a silver medal with 10, a bronze medal with 8, a fourth place with 5, a fifth with 4, a sixth with 3, a seventh with 2 and an eighth place with 1 point. It also gives out points for qualification scores within a certain range from the current world record: from 1 point for fourteen points off the record, to 15 points for equalling or raising it.

== Schedule ==
All times are local (UTC+8).

Day	Event	Final time	Winner
26 October (Monday)	Women's 10 metre air rifle	10:30	
26 October (Monday)	Men's 10 metre air rifle	11:30	
26 October (Monday)	Men's 50 metre pistol	12:30	
26 October (Monday)	Men's 25 metre rapid fire pistol	13:30	
27 October (Tuesday)	Men's 50 metre rifle prone	11:30	
27 October (Tuesday)	Women's 50 metre rifle three positions	12:30	
27 October (Tuesday)	Women's 25 metre pistol	13:30	
28 October (Wednesday)	Women's 10 metre air pistol	10:30	
28 October (Wednesday)	Men's 10 metre air pistol	11:30	
28 October (Wednesday)	Men's 50 metre rifle three positions	12:30	

== Men's 50 metre rifle three positions ==
=== Qualified shooters ===
Shooter	Event	Rank points	Score points	Total
Qiu Jian (CHN)	OG 2008 Beijing	Reigning Olympic champion		
Matthew Emmons (USA)	WCF 2008 Bangkok	Defending champion		
He Zhaohui (CHN)	WC Munich	15	11	26
Ole Magnus Bakken (NOR)	WC Beijing	15	8	22
Rajmond Debevec (SLO)	WC Beijing	10	9	19
Mario Knögler (AUT)	WC Munich	10	7	17
Gagan Narang (IND)	WC Changwon	15	0	15
Niccolò Campriani (ITA)	WC Milan	10	2	12
Stevan Pletikosić (SRB)	WC Beijing	8	2	10
Han Jin-seop (KOR)	WC Changwon	10	0	10

== Men's 50 metre rifle prone ==
=== Qualified shooters ===
Shooter	Event	Rank points	Score points	Total
Artur Ayvazyan (UKR)	OG 2008 Beijing	Reigning Olympic champion		
Warren Potent (AUS)	WCF 2008 Bangkok	Defending champion		
Guy Starik (ISR)	WC Munich	15	13	28
Matthew Emmons (USA)	WC Munich	10	12	22
Michael McPhail (USA)	WC Munich	8	13	21
Vebjørn Berg (NOR)	WC Milan	10	11	21
Josselin Henry (FRA)	WC Changwon	10	11	21
Marco De Nicolo (ITA)	WC Milan	8	12	20
Ole Magnus Bakken (NOR)	WC Changwon	8	12	20
Jozef Gönci (SVK)	WC Munich	5	13	18

== Men's 10 metre air rifle ==
=== Qualified shooters ===
Shooter	Event	Rank points	Score points	Total
Abhinav Bindra (IND)	OG 2008 Beijing	Reigning Olympic champion		
Gagan Narang (IND)	WCF 2008 Bangkok	Defending champion		
Sergy Rikhter (ISR)	WC Munich	15	14	29
Péter Sidi (HUN)	WC Beijing	15	13	28
Zhu Qinan (CHN)	WC Changwon	15	12	27
Artur Ayvazyan (UKR)	WC Milan	10	11	21
Cao Yifei (CHN)	WC Changwon	10	10	20
Vaclav Haman (CZE)	WC Beijing	8	10	18
Henri Häkkinen (FIN)	WC Milan	8	10	18
Vitali Bubnovich (BLR)	WC Munich	5	12	17

== Men's 50 metre pistol ==
=== Qualified shooters ===
Shooter	Event	Rank points	Score points	Total
Jin Jong-oh (KOR)	OG 2008 Beijing	Reigning Olympic champion		
Jin Jong-oh (KOR)	WCF 2008 Bangkok	Defending champion		
Shi Xinglong (CHN)	WC Milan	15	5	20
Damir Mikec (SRB)	WC Munich	10	8	18
Leonid Yekimov (RUS)	WC Changwon	10	7	17
Rashid Yunusmetov (KAZ)	WC Beijing	15	2	17
Vladimir Gontcharov (RUS)	WC Munich	15	1	16
Pavol Kopp (SVK)	WC Beijing	10	0	10
Serhiy Kudriya (UKR)	WC Milan	8	0	8
João Costa (POR)	WC Munich	5	2	7

== Men's 25 metre rapid fire pistol ==
=== Qualified shooters ===
Shooter	Event	Rank points	Score points	Total
Oleksandr Petriv (UKR)	OG 2008 Beijing	Reigning Olympic champion		
Aleksey Klimov (RUS)	WCF 2008 Bangkok	Defending champion		
Keith Sanderson (USA)	WC Changwon	10	13	26
Christian Reitz (GER)	WC Munich	15	8	23
Taras Magmet (UKR)	WC Milan	15	8	23
Zhang Jian (CHN)	WC Milan	10	12	22
Martin Strnad (CZE)	WC Munich	10	10	20
Vijay Kumar (IND)	WC Beijing	10	5	15
Kang Min-su (KOR)	WC Changwon	4	9	13
Leonid Yekimov (RUS)	WC Changwon	3	9	12

== Men's 10 metre air pistol ==
=== Qualified shooters ===
Shooter	Event	Rank points	Score points	Total
Pang Wei (CHN)	OG 2008 Beijing	Reigning Olympic champion		
Oleg Omelchuk (UKR)	WCF 2008 Bangkok	Defending champion		
Jin Jong-oh (KOR)	WC Changwon	10	15	25
Lukas Grunder (SUI)	WC Milan	15	9	24
Leonid Yekimov (RUS)	WC Changwon	15	8	23
Shi Xinglong (CHN)	WC Beijing	15	3	18
Lee Dae-myung (KOR)	WC Munich	10	7	17
Serhiy Kudriya (UKR)	WC Milan	10	4	14
Yury Dauhapolau (BLR)	WC Munich	8	5	13
Mai Jiajie (CHN)	WC Beijing	10	3	13

== Women's 50 metre rifle three positions ==
=== Qualified shooters ===
Shooter	Event	Rank points	Score points	Total
Du Li (CHN)	OG 2008 Beijing	Reigning Olympic champion		
Sonja Pfeilschifter (GER)	WCF 2008 Bangkok	Defending champion		
Yin Wen (CHN)	WC Munich	15	11	26
Lidija Mihajlović (SRB)	WC Milan	10	8	18
Tejaswini Sawant (IND)	WC Munich	8	9	17
Lioubov Galkina (RUS)	WC Beijing	15	0	15
Wan Xiangyan (CHN)	WC Milan	8	6	14
Alexandra Malinovskaya (KAZ)	WC Munich	5	7	12
Lajja Gauswami (IND)	WC Munich	3	8	11
Jamie Beyerle (USA)	WC Milan	5	4	9

== Women's 10 metre air rifle ==
=== Qualified shooters ===
Shooter	Event	Rank points	Score points	Total
Kateřina Emmons (CZE)	OG 2008 Beijing	Reigning Olympic champion		
Wu Liuxi (CHN)	WCF 2008 Bangkok	Defending champion		
Yin Wen (CHN)	WC Beijing	15	14	29
Darya Shytko (UKR)	WC Munich	15	14	29
Sonja Pfeilschifter (GER)	WC Milan	15	14	29
Yi Siling (CHN)	WC Beijing	10	14	24
Petra Zublasing (ITA)	WC Milan	10	13	23
Beate Gauss (GER)	WC Munich	8	14	22
Snježana Pejčić (CRO)	WC Beijing	8	14	22
Lee Da-hye (KOR)	WC Changwon	8	13	21

== Women's 25 metre pistol ==
=== Qualified shooters ===
Shooter	Event	Rank points	Score points	Total
Chen Ying (CHN)	OG 2008 Beijing	Reigning Olympic champion		
Munkhbayar Dorjsuren (GER)	WCF 2008 Bangkok	Defending champion		
Yuan Jing (CHN)	WC Munich	15	9	24
Wu Yan (CHN)	WC Changwon	15	7	22
Yuliya Bondareva (KAZ)	WC Changwon	10	10	20
Lalita Yauhleuskaya (AUS)	WC Beijing	10	6	16
Viktoria Chaika (BLR)	WC Beijing	8	6	14
Stephanie Thurmann (GER)	WC Changwon	8	3	11
Nino Salukvadze (GEO)	WC Milan	5	5	10
Lenka Marušková (CZE)	WC Beijing	3	6	9

== Women's 10 metre air pistol ==
=== Qualified shooters ===
Shooter	Event	Rank points	Score points	Total
Guo Wenjun (CHN)	OG 2008 Beijing	Reigning Olympic champion		
Ren Jie (CHN)	WCF 2008 Bangkok	Defending champion		
Hu Jun (CHN)	WC Beijing	15	12	27
Olena Kostevych (UKR)	WC Munich	15	12	27
Tong Xin (CHN)	WC Changwon	15	10	25
Lee Ho-lim (KOR)	WC Changwon	10	9	19
Heena Sidhu (IND)	WC Beijing	10	7	17
Lalita Yauhleuskaya (AUS)	WC Changwon	8	8	16
Mirosława Sagun-Lewandowska (POL)	WC Milan	8	7	15
Lenka Marušková (CZE)	WC Beijing	8	7	15
