= 2009 ISSF World Cup =

Sport competition in 2009

The 2009 ISSF World Cup is the twenty-fourth annual edition of the ISSF World Cup in the Olympic shooting events, governed by the International Shooting Sport Federation. Four qualification competitions are held in each event, spanning from April to June, and the best shooters will qualify for the ISSF World Cup Final, which will take place in China in October. The shotgun finals were originally scheduled for Istanbul, but were later moved to the Beijing Shooting Range Clay Target Field, while the rifle and pistol events will be held at a range in Wuxi. Apart from those who qualify through the 2009 World Cup competitions, the defending champions and the reigning Olympic champions will also be invited to the final. The host country may also participate with at least two shooters regardless of qualification.

For the first time, the traditional World Cup competition at the Olympic shooting ranges in Munich included shotgun events contested at the new facilities built for the 2010 ISSF World Shooting Championships.

In 2008, it was decided not to give out any quota places for the shooting competitions at the 2012 Summer Olympics in London during the 2009 season.

== Schedule ==
Competition dates	Venue	Rifle	Pistol	Shotgun	Details
April 10–15	Changwon (KOR)	✔	✔		
April 18–23	Beijing (CHN)	✔	✔		
May 3–9	Cairo (EGY)			✔	
May 14–20	Munich (GER)	✔	✔	✔	
May 23–28	Milan (ITA)	✔	✔		
June 7–13	Minsk (BLR)			✔	
June 17–23	San Marino (SMR)			✔	
October 24–29	Wuxi (CHN)	✔	✔		2009 ISSF World Cup Final (rifle and pistol)
October 29 – November 3	Beijing (CHN)			✔	2009 ISSF World Cup Final (shotgun)

== Medals by event ==
=== Men's rifle events ===
50 metre rifle three positions			50 metre rifle prone			10 metre air rifle		
Changwon (April 15)			Changwon (April 12)			Changwon (April 10)		
1st place, gold medalist(s)	Gagan Narang (IND)	1264.0 (1166)	1st place, gold medalist(s)	Warren Potent (AUS)	700.0 (596)	1st place, gold medalist(s)	Zhu Qinan (CHN)	700.3 (597)
2nd place, silver medalist(s)	Han Jin-seop (KOR)	1261.9 (1165)	2nd place, silver medalist(s)	Josselin Henry (FRA)	699.4 (596)	2nd place, silver medalist(s)	Cao Yifei (CHN)	698.6 (595)
3rd place, bronze medalist(s)	Aleksey Kamensky (RUS)	1261.7 (1167)	3rd place, bronze medalist(s)	Ole Magnus Bakken (NOR)	699.3 (597)	3rd place, bronze medalist(s)	Gagan Narang (IND)	696.7 (594)
Beijing (April 23)			Beijing (April 20)			Beijing (April 18)		
1st place, gold medalist(s)	Ole Magnus Bakken (NOR)	1276.7 (1179)	1st place, gold medalist(s)	Warren Potent (AUS)	701.5 (597)	1st place, gold medalist(s)	Péter Sidi (HUN)	699.5 (598)
2nd place, silver medalist(s)	Rajmond Debevec (SLO)	1275.9 (1180)	2nd place, silver medalist(s)	Josselin Henry (FRA)	698.8 (595)	2nd place, silver medalist(s)	Zhu Qinan (CHN)	699.3+10.7 (597)
3rd place, bronze medalist(s)	Stevan Pletikosić (SRB)	1271.4 (1173)	3rd place, bronze medalist(s)	Michael McPhail (USA)	698.7 (594)	3rd place, bronze medalist(s)	Václav Haman (CZE)	699.3+10.4 (595)
Munich (May 20)			Munich (May 18)			Munich (May 16)		
1st place, gold medalist(s)	He Zhaohui (CHN)	1283.5 (1182 JWR)	1st place, gold medalist(s)	Guy Starik (ISR)	703.3 (598)	1st place, gold medalist(s)	Sergy Rikhter (ISR)	701.7 (599 EJWR)
2nd place, silver medalist(s)	Mario Knögler (AUT)	1276.7 (1178)	2nd place, silver medalist(s)	Matthew Emmons (USA)	702.0 (597)	2nd place, silver medalist(s)	Péter Sidi (HUN)	701.5 (597)
3rd place, bronze medalist(s)	Matthew Emmons (USA)	1275.8 (1176)	3rd place, bronze medalist(s)	Michael McPhail (USA)	701.0 (598)	3rd place, bronze medalist(s)	Zhu Qinan (CHN)	700.6 (597)
Milan (May 25)			Milan (May 28)			Milan (May 23)		
1st place, gold medalist(s)	He Zhaohui (CHN)	1284.8 (1181)	1st place, gold medalist(s)	Warren Potent (AUS)	702.4 (598)	1st place, gold medalist(s)	Zhu Qinan (CHN)	699.1 (596)
2nd place, silver medalist(s)	Niccolò Campriani (ITA)	1269.6 (1173)	2nd place, silver medalist(s)	Vebjørn Berg (NOR)	701.7 (596)	2nd place, silver medalist(s)	Artur Ayvazyan (UKR)	698.8 (596)
3rd place, bronze medalist(s)	Anders Johanson (SWE)	1268.5 (1172)	3rd place, bronze medalist(s)	Marco De Nicolo (ITA)	699.3 (597)	3rd place, bronze medalist(s)	Henri Häkkinen (FIN)	697.6 (595)
Final: Wuxi (details)			Final: Wuxi (details)			Final: Wuxi (details)		
1st place, gold medalist(s)	Matthew Emmons (USA)	1277.3 (1177)	1st place, gold medalist(s)	Vebjørn Berg (NOR)	701.3 (596)	1st place, gold medalist(s)	Zhu Qinan (CHN)	701.7 (598)
2nd place, silver medalist(s)	Han Jin-seop (KOR)	1274.6 (1180)	2nd place, silver medalist(s)	Michael McPhail (USA)	700.9 (596)	2nd place, silver medalist(s)	Péter Sidi (HUN)	700.5 (599)
3rd place, bronze medalist(s)	Ole Magnus Bakken (NOR)	1270.0 (1180)	3rd place, bronze medalist(s)	Warren Potent (AUS)	700.1 (596)	3rd place, bronze medalist(s)	Henri Häkkinen (FIN)	698.6 (595)

=== Men's pistol events ===
50 metre pistol			25 metre rapid fire pistol			10 metre air pistol		
Changwon (April 11)			Changwon (April 13–14)			Changwon (April 12)		
1st place, gold medalist(s)	Jin Jong-oh (KOR)	674.6 (575)	1st place, gold medalist(s)	Aleksey Klimov (RUS)	790.2 (590)	1st place, gold medalist(s)	Leonid Yekimov (RUS)	691.0 (587)
2nd place, silver medalist(s)	Leonid Yekimov (RUS)	665.0 (573)	2nd place, silver medalist(s)	Keith Sanderson (USA)	787.3 (589)	2nd place, silver medalist(s)	Jin Jong-oh (KOR)	689.7 (594 WR)
3rd place, bronze medalist(s)	Mikhail Nestruyev (RUS)	662.2 (567)	3rd place, bronze medalist(s)	Zhang Jian (CHN)	785.7 (588)	3rd place, bronze medalist(s)	Shi Xinglong (CHN)	685.9 (584)
Beijing (April 19)			Beijing (April 21–22)			Beijing (April 20)		
1st place, gold medalist(s)	Rashid Yunusmetov (KAZ)	660.5 (568)	1st place, gold medalist(s)	Keith Sanderson (USA)	780.5 (584)	1st place, gold medalist(s)	Shi Xinglong (CHN)	683.0 (582)
2nd place, silver medalist(s)	Pavol Kopp (SVK)	657.1 (561)	2nd place, silver medalist(s)	Vijay Kumar (IND)	780.4 (581)	2nd place, silver medalist(s)	Mai Jiajie (CHN)	682.8 (582)
3rd place, bronze medalist(s)	Vladimir Isakov (RUS)	654.5 (557)	3rd place, bronze medalist(s)	Teruyoshi Akiyama (JPN)	777.5 (579)	3rd place, bronze medalist(s)	Yury Dauhapolau (BLR)	682.5 (583)
Munich (May 17)			Munich (May 17–18)			Munich (May 19)		
1st place, gold medalist(s)	Vladimir Gontcharov (RUS)	666.5 (567)	1st place, gold medalist(s)	Christian Reitz (GER)	785.3 (584)	1st place, gold medalist(s)	Jin Jong-oh (KOR)	689.4 (586)
2nd place, silver medalist(s)	Damir Mikec (SRB)	666.1 (574)	2nd place, silver medalist(s)	Martin Strnad (CZE)	780.2 (586)	2nd place, silver medalist(s)	Lee Dae-myung (KOR)	686.7 (586)
3rd place, bronze medalist(s)	Rashid Yunusmetov (KAZ)	664.9 (568)	3rd place, bronze medalist(s)	Keith Sanderson (USA)	780.0 (585)	3rd place, bronze medalist(s)	Yury Dauhapolau (BLR)	686.6 (584)
Milan (May 28)			Milan (May 26–27)			Milan (May 24)		
1st place, gold medalist(s)	Shi Xinglong (CHN)	661.6 (571)	1st place, gold medalist(s)	Taras Magmet (UKR)	784.6 (584)	1st place, gold medalist(s)	Lukas Grunder (SUI)	691.1 (588 EJWR)
2nd place, silver medalist(s)	Rashid Yunusmetov (KAZ)	659.6 (563)	2nd place, silver medalist(s)	Zhang Jian (CHN)	781.1 (588)	2nd place, silver medalist(s)	Serhiy Kudriya (UKR)	682.2 (583)
3rd place, bronze medalist(s)	Serhiy Kudriya (UKR)	652.4 (558)	3rd place, bronze medalist(s)	Christian Reitz (GER)	780.0 (582)	3rd place, bronze medalist(s)	Denis Kulakov (RUS)	680.6 (582)
Final: Wuxi (details)			Final: Wuxi (details)			Final: Wuxi (details)		
1st place, gold medalist(s)	Jin Jong-oh (KOR)	96.8 (575)	1st place, gold medalist(s)	Alexei Klimov (RUS)	783.6 (582)	1st place, gold medalist(s)	Jin Jong-oh (KOR)	691.0 (591)
2nd place, silver medalist(s)	João Costa (POR)	658.5 (564)	2nd place, silver medalist(s)	Christian Reitz (GER)	780.9 (583)	2nd place, silver medalist(s)	Pang Wei (CHN)	690.0 (589)
3rd place, bronze medalist(s)	Pavol Kopp (SVK)	656.6 (560)	3rd place, bronze medalist(s)	Teruyoshi Akiyama (JPN)	779.1 (580)	3rd place, bronze medalist(s)	Mai Jiajie (CHN)	687.9 (585)

=== Men's shotgun events ===
Trap			Double trap			Skeet		
Cairo (May 3–4)			Cairo (May 6)			Cairo (May 8–9)		
1st place, gold medalist(s)	Ryan Hadden (USA)	139+3 (116)	1st place, gold medalist(s)	Francesco D'Aniello (ITA)	185 (140)	1st place, gold medalist(s)	Mykola Milchev (UKR)	148 (125 EWR)
2nd place, silver medalist(s)	Jesús Serrano (ESP)	139+2 (118)	2nd place, silver medalist(s)	Rashid Hamad Al-Athba (QAT)	183 (139)	2nd place, silver medalist(s)	Ennio Falco (ITA)	147 (123)
3rd place, bronze medalist(s)	Khaled Almudhaf (KUW)	137 (118)	3rd place, bronze medalist(s)	Roland Gerebics (HUN)	182 (136)	3rd place, bronze medalist(s)	Marko Kemppainen (FIN)	146 (122)
Munich (May 14–15)			Munich (May 17)			Munich (May 19–20)		
1st place, gold medalist(s)	Massimo Fabbrizi (ITA)	148 (125 EWR)	1st place, gold medalist(s)	Joshua Richmond (USA)	188 (145)	1st place, gold medalist(s)	Jan Sychra (CZE)	149 (125 EWR)
2nd place, silver medalist(s)	Gao Bo (CHN)	145+6 (123)	2nd place, silver medalist(s)	Richard Faulds (GBR)	187+2 (143)	2nd place, silver medalist(s)	Georgios Achilleos (CYP)	148+2 (123)
3rd place, bronze medalist(s)	Anton Glasnović (CRO)	145+5 (123)	3rd place, bronze medalist(s)	Rashid al-Athba (QAT)	187+0 (144)	3rd place, bronze medalist(s)	Valerio Luchini (ITA)	148+1 (123)
Minsk (June 12–13)			Minsk (June 10)			Minsk (June 7–8)		
1st place, gold medalist(s)	Giovanni Pellielo (ITA)	147 (122)	1st place, gold medalist(s)	Hu Binyuan (CHN)	196 WR (147 EWR)	1st place, gold medalist(s)	Anthony Terras (FRA)	146+22 (121)
2nd place, silver medalist(s)	Michael Diamond (AUS)	144 (123)	2nd place, silver medalist(s)	Ronjan Sodhi (IND)	194 (145)	2nd place, silver medalist(s)	Heikki Meriluoto (FIN)	146+21 (121)
3rd place, bronze medalist(s)	Manavjit Singh Sandhu (IND)	142 (121)	3rd place, bronze medalist(s)	Vitaly Fokeev (RUS)	190 (142)	3rd place, bronze medalist(s)	Mykola Milchev (UKR)	146+19 (121)
San Marino (June 22–23)			San Marino (June 20)			San Marino (June 17–18)		
1st place, gold medalist(s)	Ryan Hadden (USA)	144+3 (121)	1st place, gold medalist(s)	Mo Junjie (CHN)	193 (144)	1st place, gold medalist(s)	Georgios Achilleos (CYP)	146 (121)
2nd place, silver medalist(s)	David Kostelecký (CZE)	144+2 (121)	2nd place, silver medalist(s)	Håkan Dahlby (SWE)	191 (145)	2nd place, silver medalist(s)	Zaid Almutairi (KUW)	145 (121)
3rd place, bronze medalist(s)	Sergio Piñero (DOM)	143 (121)	3rd place, bronze medalist(s)	Joshua Richmond (USA)	190 (142)	3rd place, bronze medalist(s)	Tore Brovold (NOR)	143 (118)
Final: Beijing			Final: Beijing			Final: Beijing		
1st place, gold medalist(s)	Michael Diamond (AUS)	134 (117)	1st place, gold medalist(s)	Mo Junjie (CHN)	189 (144)	1st place, gold medalist(s)	Anthony Terras (FRA)	145 (121)
2nd place, silver medalist(s)	Massimo Fabbrizi (ITA)	133 (117)	2nd place, silver medalist(s)	Hu Binyuan (CHN)	186 (144)	2nd place, silver medalist(s)	Vincent Hancock (USA)	143 (122)
3rd place, bronze medalist(s)	Giovanni Pellielo (ITA)	130 (118)	3rd place, bronze medalist(s)	Jeffrey Holguin (USA)	186 (144)	3rd place, bronze medalist(s)	Georgios Achilleos (CYP)	142 (122)

=== Women's rifle events ===
50 metre rifle three positions			10 metre air rifle		
Changwon (April 13)			Changwon (April 11)		
1st place, gold medalist(s)	Yin Wen (CHN)	685.2 (587)	1st place, gold medalist(s)	Yin Wen (CHN)	500.6 (396)
2nd place, silver medalist(s)	Wan Xiangyan (CHN)	676.8 (580)	2nd place, silver medalist(s)	Xie Jieqiong (CHN)	500.5 (398)
3rd place, bronze medalist(s)	Wang Chengyi (CHN)	676.6 (582)	3rd place, bronze medalist(s)	Lee Da-hye (KOR)	499.7 (398)
Beijing (April 21)			Beijing (April 19)		
1st place, gold medalist(s)	Lioubov Galkina (RUS)	679.9 (578)	1st place, gold medalist(s)	Yin Wen (CHN)	503.4 (399)
2nd place, silver medalist(s)	Xiong Meili (CHN)	675.8 (577)	2nd place, silver medalist(s)	Yi Siling (CHN)	501.5 (399)
3rd place, bronze medalist(s)	Wan Xianggyan (CHN)	670.7 (568)	3rd place, bronze medalist(s)	Snježana Pejčić (CRO)	500.7 (399)
Munich (May 19)			Munich (May 16)		
1st place, gold medalist(s)	Yin Wen (CHN)	687.5 (590)	1st place, gold medalist(s)	Darya Shytko (UKR)	502.7 (399)
2nd place, silver medalist(s)	Sonja Pfeilschifter (GER)	685.7 (584)	2nd place, silver medalist(s)	Sonja Pfeilschifter (GER)	502.3 (399)
3rd place, bronze medalist(s)	Tejaswini Sawant (IND)	685.0 (588)	3rd place, bronze medalist(s)	Beate Gauss (GER)	502.0 (399)
Milan (May 26)			Milan (May 23)		
1st place, gold medalist(s)	Sonja Pfeilschifter (GER)	686.9 (585)	1st place, gold medalist(s)	Sonja Pfeilschifter (GER)	502.0 (399)
2nd place, silver medalist(s)	Lidija Mihajlović (SRB)	685.3 (587)	2nd place, silver medalist(s)	Petra Zublasing (ITA)	501.5 (398)
3rd place, bronze medalist(s)	Wan Xiangyan (CHN)	684.1 (585)	3rd place, bronze medalist(s)	Xie Jieqiong (CHN)	501.4 (398)
Final: Wuxi (details)			Final: Wuxi (details)		
1st place, gold medalist(s)	Lidija Mihajlović (SRB)	689.0 (586)	1st place, gold medalist(s)	Wu Liuxi (CHN)	503.5 (400)
2nd place, silver medalist(s)	Du Li (CHN)	687.0 (587)	2nd place, silver medalist(s)	Yin Wen (CHN)	503.0 (399)
3rd place, bronze medalist(s)	Jamie Beyerle (USA)	684.4 (587)	3rd place, bronze medalist(s)	Lyubov Galkina (RUS)	500.0 (399)

=== Women's pistol events ===
25 metre pistol			10 metre air pistol		
Changwon (April 10–11)			Changwon (April 13)		
1st place, gold medalist(s)	Wu Yan (CHN)	790.5 (586)	1st place, gold medalist(s)	Tong Xin (CHN)	489.4 (388)
2nd place, silver medalist(s)	Yuliya Bondareva (KAZ)	788.9 (589)	2nd place, silver medalist(s)	Lee Ho-lim (KOR)	488.3 (387)
3rd place, bronze medalist(s)	Stefanie Thurmann (GER)	787.2 (582)	3rd place, bronze medalist(s)	Lalita Yauhleuskaya (AUS)	487.8 (386)
Beijing (April 18–19)			Beijing (April 21)		
1st place, gold medalist(s)	Zhao Xu (CHN)	787.6 (580)	1st place, gold medalist(s)	Hu Jun (CHN)	490.5 (390)
2nd place, silver medalist(s)	Lalita Yauhleuskaya (AUS)	786.1 (585)	2nd place, silver medalist(s)	Heena Sidhu (IND)	486.8 (385)
3rd place, bronze medalist(s)	Viktoria Chaika (BLR)	785.7 (585)	3rd place, bronze medalist(s)	Lenka Marušková (CZE)	485.9 (385)
Munich (May 16–17)			Munich (May 20)		
1st place, gold medalist(s)	Yuan Jing (CHN)	793.0 (588)	1st place, gold medalist(s)	Olena Kostevych (UKR)	489.4 (390)
2nd place, silver medalist(s)	Zhao Xu (CHN)	789.0 (582)	2nd place, silver medalist(s)	Tong Xin (CHN)	488.6 (385)
3rd place, bronze medalist(s)	Munkhbayar Dorjsuren (GER)	788.4 (589)	3rd place, bronze medalist(s)	Lee Ho-lim (KOR)	487.3 (388)
Milan (May 25–26)			Milan (May 24)		
1st place, gold medalist(s)	Munkhbayar Dorjsuren (GER)	789.9 (589)	1st place, gold medalist(s)	Guo Wenjun (CHN)	489.9 (392)
2nd place, silver medalist(s)	Yuan Jing (CHN)	789.4 (584)	2nd place, silver medalist(s)	Hu Jun (CHN)	488.6 (388)
3rd place, bronze medalist(s)	Lalita Yauhleuskaya (AUS)	785.2 (580)	3rd place, bronze medalist(s)	Mirosława Sagun-Lewandowska (POL)	486.0 (385)
Final: Wuxi (details)			Final: Wuxi (details)		
1st place, gold medalist(s)	Nino Salukvadze (GEO)	789.5 (589)	1st place, gold medalist(s)	Hu Jun (CHN)	486.9 (387)
2nd place, silver medalist(s)	Chen Ying (CHN)	787.8 (584)	2nd place, silver medalist(s)	Viktoria Chaika (BLR)	486.6 (387)
3rd place, bronze medalist(s)	Munkhbayar Dorjsuren (GER)	787.2 (586)	3rd place, bronze medalist(s)	Guo Wenjun (CHN)	485.3 (387)

=== Women's shotgun events ===
Trap			Skeet		
Cairo (May 3)			Cairo (May 8)		
1st place, gold medalist(s)	Daniela Del Din (SMR)	89 (70)	1st place, gold medalist(s)	Danka Barteková (SVK)	97+2 (72)
2nd place, silver medalist(s)	Jessica Rossi (ITA)	86 (70)	2nd place, silver medalist(s)	Sutiya Jiewchaloemmit (THA)	97+1 (74 EWR)
3rd place, bronze medalist(s)	Rachael Lynn Heiden (USA)	81 (66)	3rd place, bronze medalist(s)	Connie Smotek (USA)	95 (70)
Munich (May 14)			Munich (May 19)		
1st place, gold medalist(s)	Irina Laricheva (RUS)	92 (72)	1st place, gold medalist(s)	Wei Ning (CHN)	98 (74 EWR)
2nd place, silver medalist(s)	Lu Xingyu (CHN)	91 (72)	2nd place, silver medalist(s)	Svetlana Demina (RUS)	97 (73)
3rd place, bronze medalist(s)	Susanne Kiermayer (GER)	90 (72)	3rd place, bronze medalist(s)	Kim Rhode (USA)	93 (73)
Minsk (June 12)			Minsk (June 7)		
1st place, gold medalist(s)	Liu Yingzi (CHN)	90 (69)	1st place, gold medalist(s)	Svetlana Demina (RUS)	96 (71)
2nd place, silver medalist(s)	Jessica Rossi (ITA)	88+4 (70)	2nd place, silver medalist(s)	Caitlin Connor (USA)	95+2 (71)
3rd place, bronze medalist(s)	Susanne Kiermayer (GER)	88+3 (68)	3rd place, bronze medalist(s)	Katiuscia Spada (ITA)	95+1 (72)
San Marino (June 22)			San Marino (June 17)		
1st place, gold medalist(s)	Daina Gudzinevičiūtė (LTU)	88 (68)	1st place, gold medalist(s)	Chiara Cainero (ITA)	95 (72)
2nd place, silver medalist(s)	Alessandra Perilli (SMR)	87+6 (70)	2nd place, silver medalist(s)	Kim Rhode (USA)	88+3 (65)
3rd place, bronze medalist(s)	Lu Xingyu (CHN)	87+5 (68)	3rd place, bronze medalist(s)	Christine Brinker (GER)	88+2 (68)
Final: Beijing (September 28)			Final: Beijing (October 1)		
1st place, gold medalist(s)	Liu Yingzi (CHN)	84 (69)	1st place, gold medalist(s)	Christine Wenzel (GER)	90 (69)
2nd place, silver medalist(s)	Zuzana Rehák-Štefečeková (SVK)	79 (61)	2nd place, silver medalist(s)	Katiuscia Spada (ITA)	90 (71)
3rd place, bronze medalist(s)	Satu Mäkelä-Nummela (FIN)	75 (60)	3rd place, bronze medalist(s)	Svetlana Demina (RUS)	89 (69)

== Multiple winners ==
=== Four titles ===
- Yin Wen (CHN) in women's 50 metre rifle three positions and 10 metre air rifle

=== Three titles ===
- Warren Potent (AUS) in men's 50 metre rifle prone

=== Two titles ===
- He Zhaohui (CHN) in men's 50 metre rifle three positions
- Jin Jong-oh (KOR) in men's 50 metre pistol and 10 metre air pistol
- Sonja Pfeilschifter (GER) in women's 50 metre rifle three positions and 10 metre air rifle
- Ryan Hadden (USA) in men's trap
- Shi Xinglong (CHN) in men's 50 metre pistol and 10 metre air pistol
- Zhu Qinan (CHN) in men's 10 metre air rifle

== See also ==
- Shooting at the 2012 Summer Olympics – Qualification
- 2009 World Shotgun Championships
