= Shooting at the 2012 Summer Olympics – Women's 10 metre air pistol =

Women's 10 metre air pistol at the Games of the XXX Olympiad
- Venue: Royal Artillery Barracks
- Date: 29 July 2012
- Competitors: 49 from 38 nations
- Winning score: 488.1

Medalists
1st place, gold medalist(s)		Guo Wenjun	China
2nd place, silver medalist(s)		Celine Goberville	France
3rd place, bronze medalist(s)		Olena Kostevych	Ukraine

The Women's 10 metre air pistol event at the 2012 Olympic Games took place on 29 July 2012 at the Royal Artillery Barracks.

The event consisted of two rounds: a qualifier and a final. In the qualifier, each shooter fired 40 shots with an air pistol at 10 metres distance. Scores for each shot were in increments of 1, with a maximum score of 10.

The top 8 shooters in the qualifying round moved on to the final round. There, they fired an additional 10 shots. These shots scored in increments of .1, with a maximum score of 10.9. The total score from all 50 shots was used to determine final ranking.

== Records ==
Prior to this competition, the existing world and Olympic records were as follows.

Qualification records
World record	Svetlana Smirnova (RUS)	393	Munich, Germany	23 May 1998
Olympic record	Natalia Paderina (RUS)	391	Beijing, China	10 August 2008

Final records
World record	Ren Jie (CHN)	493.5 (390+103.5)	Munich, Germany	22 May 1999
Olympic record	Guo Wenjun (CHN)	492.3 (390+102.3)	Beijing, China	10 August 2008

== Qualification round ==
Rank	Athlete	Country	1	2	3	4	Total	Notes
1	Guo Wenjun	China	98	98	98	94	388	Q
2	Olena Kostevych	Ukraine	97	95	97	98	387	Q
3	Céline Goberville	France	96	98	96	97	387	Q
4	Su Yuling	China	97	96	96	97	386	Q
5	Zorana Arunović	Serbia	94	98	96	97	385	Q
6	Viktoria Chaika	Belarus	96	96	98	95	385	Q
7	Lenka Marušková	Czech Republic	95	97	96	97	385	Q
8	Liubov Yaskevich	Russia	96	96	94	99	385	Q
9	Antoaneta Boneva	Bulgaria	95	97	96	96	384	
10	Jo Yong-Suk	North Korea	97	96	95	96	384	
11	Tanyaporn Prucksakorn	Thailand	93	98	98	94	384	
12	Heena Sidhu	India	93	97	97	95	382	
13	Kim Jang-Mi	South Korea	97	97	95	93	382	
14	Dina Aspandiyarova	Australia	96	94	98	94	382	
15	Joana Castelão	Portugal	95	98	96	92	381	
16	Zsófia Csonka	Hungary	98	96	94	93	381	
17	Kim Byung-Hee	South Korea	96	95	93	97	381	
18	Otryadyn Gündegmaa	Mongolia	95	94	94	97	380	
19	Alejandra Zavala	Mexico	97	95	94	94	380	
20	Claudia Verdicchio-Krause	Germany	95	93	97	95	380	
21	Le Thi Hoang Ngoc	Vietnam	97	95	94	93	379	
22	Bobana Veličković	Serbia	93	92	98	96	379	
23	Annu Raj Singh	India	94	96	97	91	378	
24	Maria Grozdeva	Bulgaria	95	94	94	95	378	
25	Munkhbayar Dorjsuren	Germany	95	94	94	95	378	
26	Sonia Franquet	Spain	93	95	91	99	378	
27	Tien Chia-chen	Chinese Taipei	94	96	93	95	378	
28	Sandra Uptagraft	United States	94	91	96	97	378	
29	Marina Zgurscaia	Moldova	91	92	97	97	377	
30	Noura Nasri	Tunisia	96	93	93	95	377	
31	Yukari Konishi	Japan	93	95	94	95	377	
32	Mira Suhonen	Finland	95	99	94	89	377	
33	Nino Salukvadze	Georgia	93	95	92	96	376	
34	Dorothy Ludwig	Canada	94	96	91	95	376	
35	Heidi Diethelm Gerber	Switzerland	91	91	97	96	375	
36	Yu Ai-wen	Chinese Taipei	92	94	95	94	375	
37	Natalia Paderina	Russia	93	94	95	93	375	
38	Stéphanie Tirode	France	95	92	95	93	375	
39	Irada Ashumova	Azerbaijan	96	93	90	93	372	
40	Lalita Yauhleskaya	Australia	95	90	94	92	371	
41	Naphaswan Yangpaiboon	Thailand	91	92	92	95	370	
42	Athina Douka	Greece	92	91	93	93	369	
43	Ana Luiza Souza Lima	Brazil	91	95	90	91	367	
44	Beata Bartków-Kwiatkowska	Poland	92	97	87	90	366	
45	Maribel Pineda	Venezuela	89	91	93	92	365	
46	Noor Al-Ameri	Iraq	91	91	87	91	360	
47	Georgina Geikie	Great Britain	90	89	88	92	359	
48	Claudia Fajardo Rodriguez	Honduras	83	91	84	90	348	
49	Ip Pui Yi	Hong Kong	89	89	80	88	346	

== Final ==
Rank	Athlete	Qual	1	2	3	4	5	6	7	8	9	10	Final	Total	Silver shoot-off	Notes
1st place, gold medalist(s)	Guo Wenjun (CHN)	388	8.0	10.8	9.3	10.5	10.1	10.1	10.3	9.8	10.4	10.8	100.1	488.1		
2nd place, silver medalist(s)	Celine Goberville (FRA)	387	9.8	10.0	9.4	9.6	10.8	10.6	10.1	10.4	10.1	8.8	99.6	486.6	10.6	
3rd place, bronze medalist(s)	Olena Kostevych (UKR)	387	10.1	9.7	9.1	10.6	9.9	10.6	10.1	9.8	9.2	10.5	99.6	486.6	9.7	
4	Liubov Yaskevich (RUS)	385	10.8	9.7	9.1	10.1	10.0	9.8	9.8	10.5	10.5	10.7	101.0	486.0		
5	Viktoria Chaika (BLR)	385	9.4	9.6	10.2	10.6	9.8	10.2	9.5	10.2	10.7	10.0	100.2	485.2		
6	Su Yuling (CHN)	386	8.7	9.4	9.9	10.3	10.4	9.9	10.1	9.4	10.3	10.2	98.6	484.6		
7	Zorana Arunović (SRB)	385	9.8	9.3	9.4	10.3	10.0	9.4	10.4	9.6	10.4	9.9	98.5	483.5		
8	Lenka Marušková (CZE)	385	10.5	8.8	10.6	10.5	9.5	10.2	9.4	10.2	8.8	9.3	97.6	482.6		
