= Vijay Kumar (sport shooter) =

Indian sport shooter (born 1985)

Honorary Captain Vijay Kumar Sharma AVSM, SM
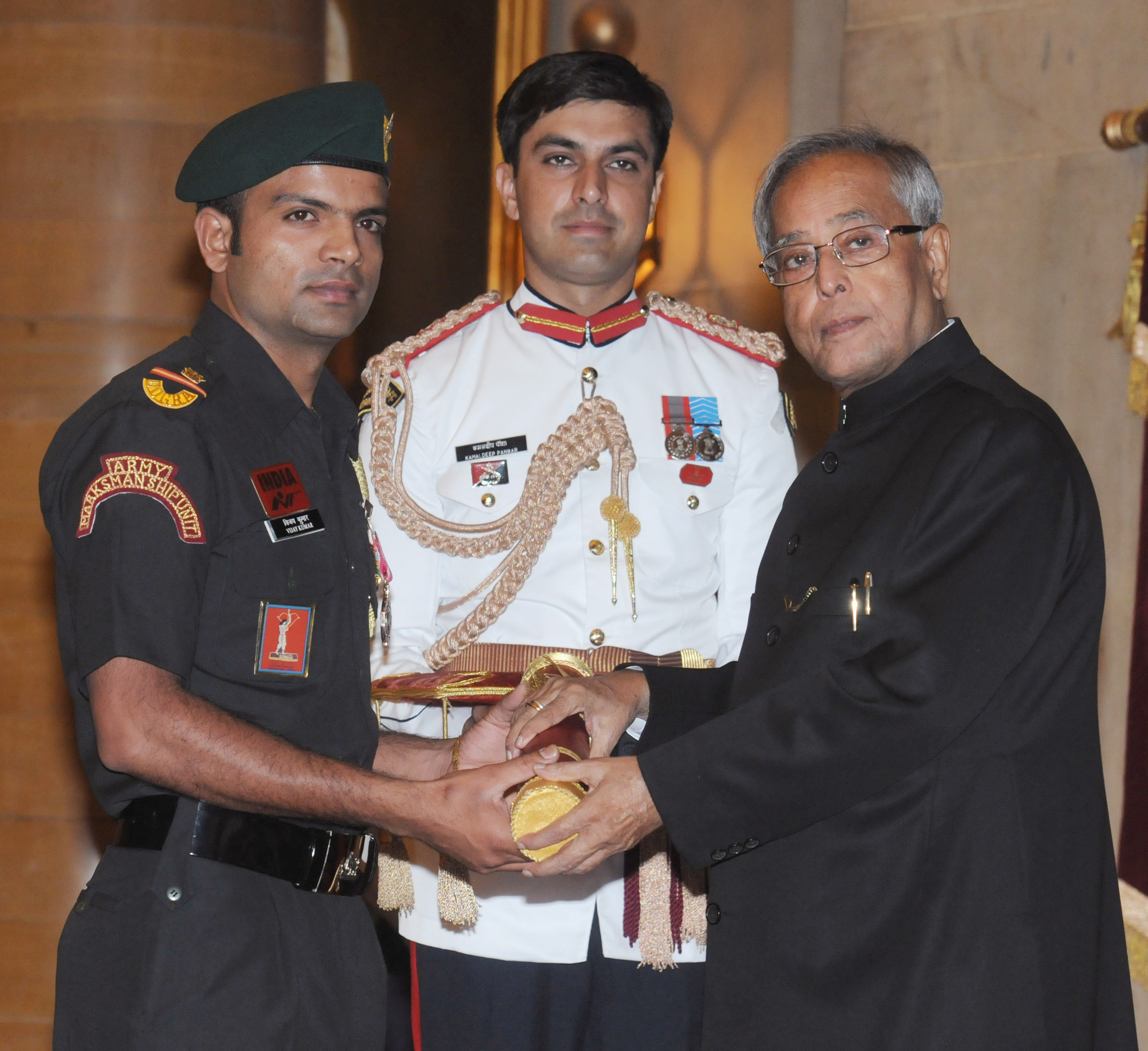
- The President, Shri Pranab Mukherjee presenting the Padma Shri Award to Vijay Kumar, in 2013

Personal details
- Born: 19 August 1985 (age 41) Harsour, Hamirpur; Himachal Pradesh, India

Military service
- Allegiance: India
- Branch/service: Indian Army
- Years of service: 2001 – 2017
- Rank: Honorary Captain
- Awards: Padma Shri; Ati Vishisht Seva Medal; Sena Medal; Rajiv Gandhi Khel Ratna; Arjuna Award
- Sports career
- Sport: Shooting
- Event: 25 metre rapid fire pistol
Medal record
Men's shooting
Representing India
Event	1st	2nd	3rd
Olympic Games	–	1	–
Commonwealth Games	5	1	–
Asian Games	–	1	2
ISSF World Cup	–	2	–
Total	5	5	2
Olympic Games
Silver medal – second place	2012 London	25 m rapid fire pistol
ISSF World Cup
Silver medal – second place	2009 Beijing	25m Rapid Fire Pistol
Silver medal – second place	2011 Fort Benning	25m Rapid Fire Pistol
Commonwealth Games
Gold medal – first place	2006 Melbourne	25m Rapid Fire Pistol (Singles)
Gold medal – first place	2006 Melbourne	25m Rapid Fire Pistol (Pairs)
Gold medal – first place	2010 Delhi	25 metre rapid fire pistol pairs
Gold medal – first place	2010 Delhi	25 metre rapid fire pistol singles
Gold medal – first place	2010 Delhi	25-metre centre fire pistol pairs
Silver medal – second place	2010 Delhi	25-metre centre fire pistol singles
Asian Games
Silver medal – second place	2014 Incheon	25m Centre Fire Pistol (Team)
Bronze medal – third place	2006 Doha	25m Rapid Fire Pistol
Bronze medal – third place	2010 Guangzhou	25m Centre Fire Pistol
Asian Championships
Gold medal – first place	2012 Doha	25 m standard pistol
Silver medal – second place	2007 Kuwait City	25 m center fire pistol
Silver medal – second place	2007 Kuwait City	25 m center fire pistol team
Silver medal – second place	2012 Doha	25 m rapid fire pistol team

Honorary Captain Vijay Kumar Sharma, AVSM, SM (born 19 August 1985) is an Indian sport shooter. He won the silver medal in the individual 25 metre rapid fire pistol event at the 2012 Summer Olympics. Kumar hails from Barsar village of Hamirpur district of Himachal Pradesh and is a retired Subedar Major (Warrant Officer Class I) in the Dogra Regiment (16th Battalion) Indian Army, who was later promoted to Honorary Captain Rank. Vijay Kumar is supported by the Olympic Gold Quest initiative. He is the only Indian to have won an Olympic medal at 25m rapid Fire Pistol . He has been posted at Indian Army Marksmanship Unit (AMU) Mhow since 2003 until retirement, where he was coached by the Russian Pavel Smirnov.

== Early life and background ==
Born in Himachal Pradesh, Kumar is the son of Banku Ram, a retired Indian Army subedar, and his wife Roshni Devi. According to his father, while Kumar was "always intrigued" by his father's guns, he only developed his interest in shooting after enlisting in the Indian Army. Kumar joined the Indian Army in 2001 as a sepoy (private), and was inducted into the Army Marksmanship Unit (AMU) at Mhow in 2003. His prowess ensured him a direct promotion from sepoy to havildar (sergeant) by 2006. He was promoted to naib subedar on 20 April 2006.

== Shooting career ==
=== Early career (2006–2009) ===
At the 2006 Commonwealth Games, he won two gold medals: the individual 25 meter rapid fire pistol competition and the pairs competition in the same event together with Pemba Tamang. The same year, he won a bronze medal in the Asian Games. In 2006, he was awarded the Arjuna award by the Indian government.

In 2007, he finished second at the Asian Championship in 25 metre center-fire pistol. He also won a silver medal at the 2009 ISSF World Cup Beijing in rapid fire pistol, where he was defeated by 0.1 points. He was promoted to subedar on 10 February 2009 (seniority from 1 July 2008)

=== Commonwealth and Olympic glory (2010–14) ===
In the 2010 Commonwealth Games, he won three gold medals and one silver. In 25 metre rapid fire pistol pairs, Gurpreet Singh and Vijay Kumar won the gold medal scoring 1162 points, setting a new Commonwealth games record. He won the 25 meter rapid fire pistol singles event and also teamed up with Harpreet Singh to win the 25-metre center fire pistol pairs event. In the 25-metre centre fire pistol singles, he finished second winning a silver, losing out to fellow Indian Harpreet Singh.

Kumar won the silver medal in the 25 m rapid fire pistol event at 2012 London Olympics. He finished with an average score of 9.767 and had a score of 293 with 7 inner 10s in the first stage. Vijay's silver was the second medal for India at London 2012. Earlier Kumar failed to qualify for the men's 10 m air pistol finals after finishing 31st on 28 July 2012.

Kumar was chosen to be the Indian flagbearer at the 2014 Commonwealth Games. The Indian trio of Vijay Kumar, Pemba Tamang and Gurpreet Singh won the silver medal in the 25m center fire event at the 2014 Asian Games, held at Incheon, South Korea. The team scored a total of 1740, two behind gold medalists China.

== Later career ==
Vijay Kumar retired from the army in 2017, after 15 years of service. As of 2019, he is finishing a bachelor's degree in business administration from Manav Rachna University in Faridabad, and has been offered a direct-entry position as deputy superintendent of police (DSP) by the Himachal Pradesh state government.

== Performance timelines ==
=== 25 metre rapid fire pistol ===
	2002	2006	2007	2008	2009	2010	2011	2012	2013	2014	2015
Olympic Games	Not held			—	Not held			(silver) Silver	Not held		
World Championships	Not held	34th 569	Not held			11th 578	Not held			36th 569	Not held
Asian Games/AC		4th 577+198.3	14th 566	Not held				7th 577	Not held		
Commonwealth Games	Not held	(gold) Gold; 581+197.2	Not held			(gold) Gold; 583+204.5	Not held			8th 274	Not held
World Cup 1	—	19th 575	35th 561	—	10th 577						
World Cup 2	—	12th 576	34th 567	8th 580	(silver) Silver; 581+199.4						
World Cup 3	—	37th 568	14th 572	15th 577	16th 576						
World Cup 4	38th 560	25th 573	40th 567	33rd 562	21st 572						
World Cup Final	NQ	NQ	NQ	NQ	4th 579						

=== 25 metre center-fire pistol ===
	2006	2007
World Championships	27th 577	Not held
Asian Games/AC	9th 580	(silver) Silver; 582
Commonwealth Games	—	Not held

=== 25-metre standard pistol ===
	2007
World Championships	Not held
Asian Games/AC	12th 562
Commonwealth Games	Not held
Olympics	Not held

=== 10 metre air pistol ===
	2005
Olympic Games	Not held
World Championships	2nd
Asian Games/AC	—
Commonwealth Games	Not held
World Cup 1	—
World Cup 2	—
World Cup 3	89th 560
World Cup 4	73rd 564
World Cup Final	NQ

== Awards and recognition ==
- Arjuna Award (2007)
- Rajiv Gandhi Khel Ratna (2012)
- Ati Vishisht Seva Medal (2013)
- Padma Shri (2013)

For winning the silver medal at 2012 London Olympics:

- Promotion from subedar to subedar-major on 12 August 2012.
- ₹1 crore (US$100,000) cash award by the Government of Himachal Pradesh
- ₹50 lakh (US$52,000) by the Government of Rajasthan.

=== Medal bar ===

Padma Shri		Ati Vishist Seva Medal	
Sena Medal	Meritorious Service Medal	50th Anniversary of Independence Medal	9 Years Long Service Medal
