= Shooting at the 2008 Summer Olympics – Women's 10 metre air pistol =

Women's 10 metre air pistol at the Games of the XXIX Olympiad
- Venue: Beijing Shooting Range Hall
- Date: August 10, 2008
- Competitors: 44 from 30 nations
- Winning score: 492.3 (OR)

Medalists
1st place, gold medalist(s)		Guo Wenjun	China
2nd place, silver medalist(s)		Natalia Paderina	Russia
3rd place, bronze medalist(s)		Nino Salukvadze	Georgia

The Women's 10 metre air pistol event at the 2008 Olympic Games took place on August 10 at the Beijing Shooting Range Hall. Natalia Paderina of Russia set a new Olympic record in the qualification round with 391 points out of 400, but entering the final Guo Wenjun was only one point behind and through the last ten shots emerged as the winner. After the competition, Paderina (silver) and Georgian veteran Nino Salukvadze (bronze) posed together; Salukvadze took the opportunity to take a stand for a peaceful solution.

The event consisted of two rounds: a qualifier and a final. In the qualifier, each shooter fired 40 shots with an air pistol at 10 metres distance. Scores for each shot were in increments of 1, with a maximum score of 10.

The top 8 shooters in the qualifying round moved on to the final round. There, they fired an additional 10 shots. These shots scored in increments of .1, with a maximum score of 10.9. The total score from all 50 shots was used to determine final ranking.

== Records ==
Prior to this competition, the existing world and Olympic records were as follows.

Qualification records
World record	Svetlana Smirnova (RUS)	393	Munich, Germany	23 May 1998
Olympic record	Marina Logvinenko (RUS); Tao Luna (CHN)	390	Atlanta, United States; Athens, Greece	21 July 1996; 17 August 2004

Final records
World record	Ren Jie (CHN)	493.5 (390+103.5)	Munich, Germany	22 May 1999
Olympic record	Olga Klochneva (RUS)	490.1 (389+101.1)	Atlanta, United States	21 July 1996

Both Olympic records were broken during the competition: the qualification record was raised to 391 by Natalia Paderina and the final record to 492.3 (390+102.3) by Guo Wenjun.

== Qualification round ==
Rank	Athlete	Country	1	2	3	4	Total	Notes
1	Natalia Paderina	Russia	97	98	98	98	391	Q OR
2	Guo Wenjun	China	96	98	99	97	390	Q
3	Tsogbadrakhyn Mönkhzul	Mongolia	96	95	97	99	387	Q
4	Nino Salukvadze	Georgia	97	96	96	97	386	Q
5	Viktoria Chaika	Belarus	97	94	96	97	384	Q
6	Jasna Šekarić	Serbia	96	94	98	96	384	Q
7	Mirosława Sagun-Lewandowska	Poland	95	96	97	96	384	Q
8	Mira Nevansuu	Finland	99	95	95	95	384	Q
9	Svetlana Smirnova	Russia	96	95	94	98	383	
10	Claudia Verdicchio	Germany	93	98	96	96	383	
11	Mariya Grozdeva	Bulgaria	96	93	95	98	382	
12	Otryadyn Gündegmaa	Mongolia	97	93	95	97	382	
13	Zauresh Baibussinova	Kazakhstan	94	94	98	96	382	
14	Sonia Franquet	Spain	93	97	96	96	382	
15	Jo Yong-Suk	North Korea	98	96	93	95	382	
16	Kim Yun-Mi	South Korea	96	95	97	94	382	
17	Cornelia Frölich	Switzerland	96	96	94	95	381	
18	Lalita Yauhleuskaya	Australia	97	95	96	93	381	
19	Ren Jie	China	97	96	95	93	381	
20	Tanyaporn Prucksakorn	Thailand	95	95	93	97	380	
21	Lee Ho-lim	South Korea	92	97	95	96	380	
22	Huang Yi-ling	Chinese Taipei	96	93	94	96	379	
23	Brigitte Roy	France	93	94	97	95	379	
24	Munkhbayar Dorjsuren	Germany	95	93	97	94	379	
25	Maria Pilar Fernandez	Spain	93	97	96	93	379	
26	Lenka Marušková	Czech Republic	96	96	94	93	379	
27	Sandra Kolly	Switzerland	94	92	97	95	378	
28	Maura Genovesi	Italy	94	94	95	95	378	
29	Zsófia Csonka	Hungary	94	93	97	94	378	
30	Sławomira Szpek	Poland	95	95	94	94	378	
31	Olena Kostevych	Ukraine	98	93	94	93	378	
32	Irena Tanova	Bulgaria	96	93	95	93	377	
33	Stéphanie Tirode	France	96	94	94	93	377	
34	Luisa Maida	El Salvador	94	93	93	95	375	
35	Michaela Musilová	Czech Republic	95	94	93	93	375	
36	Dina Aspandiyarova	Australia	96	96	94	89	375	
37	Brenda Shinn	United States	89	98	93	93	373	
38	Michiko Fukushima	Japan	91	94	97	91	373	
39	Avianna Chao	Canada	89	93	94	94	370	
40	Lindita Kodra	Albania	92	93	93	92	370	
41	Rebecca Snyder	United States	93	92	94	91	370	
42	Zhanna Shapialevich	Belarus	91	92	95	90	368	
43	Carolina Lozado	Uruguay	93	92	92	90	367	
44	Patricia Wilka	Paraguay	90	91	27		208	DNF

DNF Did not finish – OR Olympic record – Q Qualified for final

== Final ==
Rank	Athlete	Qual	1	2	3	4	5	6	7	8	9	10	Final	Total	Notes
1	Guo Wenjun (CHN)	390	10.0	10.5	10.4	10.4	10.1	10.3	9.4	10.7	10.8	9.7	102.3	492.3	OR
2	Natalia Paderina (RUS)	391	10.0	8.5	10.0	10.2	10.6	10.5	9.8	9.7	9.5	9.3	98.1	489.1	
3	Nino Salukvadze (GEO)	386	9.8	10.3	10.0	9.5	10.2	10.7	10.4	10.6	9.1	10.8	101.4	487.4	
4	Viktoria Chaika (BLR)	384	9.3	9.4	10.4	10.1	10.2	10.5	9.2	10.5	9.8	8.6	98.0	482.0	
5	Mirosława Sagun-Lewandowska (POL)	384	8.1	10.3	9.2	9.9	9.8	10.4	9.9	9.4	10.7	9.6	97.3	481.3	
6	Jasna Šekarić (SRB)	384	10.2	9.6	9.9	9.9	9.3	9.1	9.7	10.0	9.3	9.9	96.9	480.9	
7	Mira Nevansuu (FIN)	384	8.7	9.3	9.2	10.3	9.8	10.0	9.7	9.9	9.9	9.7	96.5	480.5	
8	Tsogbadrakhyn Mönkhzul (MGL)	387	9.3	10.0	8.7	8.3	9.2	9.5	8.5	10.7	9.2	9.2	92.6	479.6	

OR Olympic record
