= Kim Eun-hye =

Kim Eun-hye may refer to:

- Kim Eun-hye (politician)
- Kim Eun-hye (sport shooter)
