= Tsogbadrakhyn Mönkhzul =

Mongolian sport shooter (born 1981)

Tsogbadrakh Mönkhzul
Personal information
- Nationality: Mongolia
- Born: 28 February 1981 (age 45) Ulaanbaatar, Mongolia
- Height: 1.75 m (5 ft 9 in)
- Weight: 70 kg (154 lb)

Sport
- Country: Mongolia
- Sport: Shooting
- Event(s): 10 m air pistol (AP40); 25 m pistol (SP)
- Coached by: Altantsetseg.B, Undralbat Lhagva
Medal record
Women's shooting
Representing Mongolia
World Championships
Gold medal – first place	2022 Cairo	25m centre fire pistol
Silver medal – second place	2022 Cairo	50 m pistol mixed
Asian Championships
Gold medal – first place	2013 Tehran	25 m pistol
Gold medal – first place	2008 Nanjing	10 m air pistol team
Gold medal – first place	2005 Bangkok	10 m air pistol team
Silver medal – second place	2007 Kuwait City	25 m pistol
Silver medal – second place	2007 Kuwait City	25 m pistol team
Silver medal – second place	2008 Nanjing	10 m air pistol
Bronze medal – third place	2013 Tehran	25 m pistol team
Bronze medal – third place	2015 Kuwait City	25 m pistol team

Tsogbadrakh Mönkhzul (Mongolian: Цогбадрахын Мөнхзул; born February 28, 1981, in Ulaanbaatar) is a Mongolian sport shooter. She won a gold medal in the women's sport pistol at the 2007 ISSF World Cup series in Bangkok, Thailand, accumulating a score of 783.3 points.

Mönkhzul represented Mongolia at the 2008 Summer Olympics in Beijing, where she competed in two pistol shooting events, along with her teammate Otryadyn Gündegmaa. She placed eighth in the women's 10 m air pistol, by nine tenths of a point (0.9) behind Finland's Mira Nevansuu, with a total score of 479.6 targets (387 in the preliminary rounds, and 92.6 in the final). Three days later, Mönkhzul competed for her second event, 25 m pistol, where she was able to shoot 290 targets in the precision stage, and 291 in the rapid fire, for a total score of 581 points, finishing only in twelfth place.

Mönkhzul represented Mongolia at the 2016 Summer Olympics in Rio de Janeiro, she competed in two pistol shooting events again. She competed in the women's 10 m air pistol and the women's 25 m pistol along with Otryadyn Gündegmaa once again. In the 10 m event she finished 32nd of 44 shooters with a total score of 378 targets, she did not advance to the finals. In the 25 m event she finished 11th of 40 shooters with a score of 580 targets, Mönkhzul finished 1 target ahead of Gündegmaa who finished 12th. Mönkhzul was 2 targets off from qualifying for the finals.

Mönkhzul held a winner title at the 2022 ISSF World Shooting Championships in Cairo, Egypt, accumulating a score of 585 point in the 25m centre fire pistol.
