= Leonid Yekimov =

Russian sport shooter

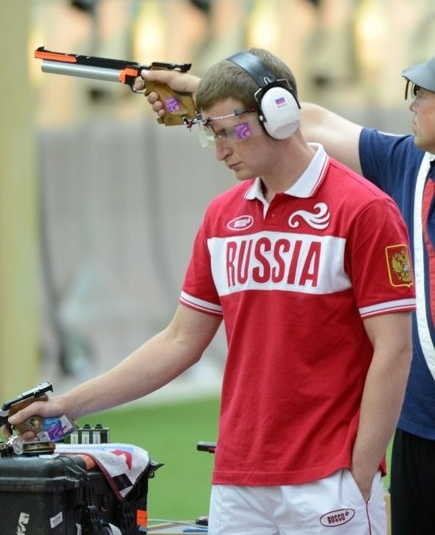
- Leonid Yekimov at the 2012 Olympics

Personal information
- Full name: Leonid Aleksandrovich Yekimov
- National team: Russia
- Born: 13 September 1987 (age 38) Novodvinsk, Russian SSR, Soviet Union (now Russia)
- Height: 1.82 m (6 ft 0 in)
- Weight: 75 kg (165 lb)

Sport
- Country: Russia
- Sport: Shooting
- Club: Russian Army
Medal record
Representing Russia
European Shooting Championships
Gold medal – first place	2007	10 m air pistol
Gold medal – first place	2008	10 m air pistol
Gold medal – first place	2013 Osijek	25 m SP team
Silver medal – second place	2009	25 m standard pistol
Silver medal – second place	2021 Osijek	25 m rapid fire pistol
Bronze medal – third place	2021 Osijek	25 m rapid fire pistol mixed
Military World Games
Gold medal – first place	2019 Wuhan	25 m rapid fire pistol
Silver medal – second place	2019 Wuhan	25 m rapid fire pistol team

Leonid Aleksandrovich Yekimov (Russian: Леонид Александрович Екимов; born 13 September 1987) is a Russian sport shooter. At the 2006 ISSF World Shooting Championships, he won the junior competition in 25 metre pistol and finished second in 25 metre standard pistol. The following year, although still a junior, he opted to participate in the open class of the European Championships in 10 metre air pistol and helped the Russian team to a gold medal and a new world record, also breaking the junior world record of Kanstantsin Lukashyk in the qualification round. He then proceeded to defeat teammates Mikhail Nestruyev and Vladimir Isakov in the final, to top a Russian triple victory and win his first international senior title. He defended this gold medal the next year after a qualification score of 591 points, two points below the world record.

Yekimov made his Olympic debut in the air pistol competition in Beijing in 2008, and finished sixth. He was also chosen as Sergei Alifirenko's replacement in the rapid fire pistol competition, when Alifirenko, who won gold in Sydney and bronze in Athens, had to withdraw. Although not a renowned rapid fire shooter, Yekimov has won a national competition in the event and when attaining his minimum qualification score for the Olympics, he reached a score of 586 in Munich, only five points behind the world record. In Beijing, Yekimov was in the lead after the first day but dropped to second after the second stage and finally to fourth after the final.

== Performance timelines ==
=== 50 metre pistol ===
	2006	2007	2008	2009
Olympic Games	Not held		—	Not held
World Championships	—	Not held		
European Championships	Not held	—	Not held	5th 557+93.5
World Cup 1	—	—	—	(silver) Silver; 573+92.0
World Cup 2	—	(silver) Silver; 562+95.7	8th 562+89.5	—
World Cup 3	—	9th 561	—	16th 560
World Cup 4	5th 563+94.7	—	—	—
World Cup Final	NQ	4th 562+92.9	NQ	Qualified

=== 25 metre rapid fire pistol ===
	2006	2007	2008	2009
Olympic Games	Not held		4th 581+197.2	Not held
World Championships	—	Not held		
European Championships	Not held	—	Not held	—
World Cup 1	—	—	—	6th 585+183.8
World Cup 2	—	—	—	—
World Cup 3	—	—	—	8th 580
World Cup 4	—	—	—	—
World Cup Final	NQ	NQ	NQ	Qualified

=== 25 metre standard pistol ===
	2009
World Championships	Not held
European Championships	(silver) Silver; 575
European Cup 1	—
European Cup 2	—
European Cup 3	—
European Cup 4	
European Cup Final	Qualified

=== 10 metre air pistol ===
	2006	2007	2008	2009
Olympic Games	Not held		5th 582+98.5	Not held
World Championships	—	Not held		
European Championships	—	Gold; 588+99.3	Gold; 591+100.3	—
World Cup 1	(bronze) Bronze; 587+96.4	—	—	(gold) Gold; 587+104.0
World Cup 2	—	(silver) Silver; 584+102.1	18th 580	—
World Cup 3	—	14th 582	(silver) Silver; 584+102.7	—
World Cup 4	12th 580	—	—	—
World Cup Final	6th 578+101.3	NQ	NQ	Qualified

== Records ==
Current world records held in 10 metre air pistol
Men	Teams	1759	Russia (Isakov, Nestruyev, Yekimov); China (Wang, Pang, Mai)	March 16, 2007; March 9, 2014	Deauville (FRA); Kuwait City (KUW)
Junior Men	Individual	588	Leonid Yekimov (RUS); Lukas Grunder (SUI)	March 16, 2007; May 24, 2009	Deauville (FRA); Milan (ITA)
