= Marina Zgurscaia =

Moldovan female sport shooter

Marina Zgurscaia (born 21 June 1989) is a Moldovan female sport shooter. At the 2012 Summer Olympics, she competed in the Women's 10 metre air pistol, finishing in 29th place.
