= Claudia Fajardo =

Honduran sport shooter

Personal information
- Born: 26 September 1985 (age 40) Puerto Cortés, Honduras

Sport
- Sport: Shooting sports

Claudia Carolina Fajardo Rodríguez (born 26 September 1985) is a Honduran sports shooter. At the 2012 Summer Olympics, she competed in the women's 10-metre air pistol. Fajardo Rodriguez ranked 48th in the qualification round and failed to qualify for the final.
