= Noura Nasri =

Tunisian sport shooter

Medal record

Women's Shooting

Representing Tunisia

African Shooting Championships
Gold medal – first place	2014 Cairo	10 m air pistol
Gold medal – first place	2014 Cairo	Team 10 m air pistol
Silver medal – second place	2011 Cairo	10 m air pistol
Bronze medal – third place	2011 Cairo	25 m pistol

Noura Nasri is a Tunisian sport shooter. At the 2012 Summer Olympics, she competed in the Women's 10 metre air pistol. At the 2014 African Shooting Championship in Cairo, Nasri won gold in the 10 m air pistol as well as Team 10 m air pistol vents.
