= 2005 Asian Airgun Championships =

International sport shooting competition

- Host city: Bangkok, Thailand
- Dates: 12–19 September 2005

The 2005 Asian Airgun Championships were held in Bangkok, Thailand between 12 and 19 September 2005.

== Medal summary ==
=== Men ===
Event	Gold	Silver	Bronze
10 m air pistol	Rashid Yunusmetov; Kazakhstan	Dilshod Mukhtarov; Uzbekistan	Tomoyuki Matsuda; Japan
10 m air pistol team	Kazakhstan; Vladimir Issachenko; Vyacheslav Podlesniy; Rashid Yunusmetov	India; Samaresh Jung; Satendra Kumar; Vivek Singh	Thailand; Pongpol Kulchairattana; Jakkrit Panichpatikum; Noppadon Sutiviruch
10 m air rifle	Gagan Narang; India	Tevarit Majchacheep; Thailand	Asif Hossain Khan; Bangladesh
10 m air rifle team	India; Abhinav Bindra; Manoj Kumar Hlyan; Gagan Narang	Thailand; Tevarit Majchacheep; Varavut Majchacheep; Thanapat Thananchai	Kuwait; Husain Al-Ajmi; Mutlaq Al-Juraid; Khaled Al-Subaie
10 m running target	Jeong You-jin; South Korea	Wang Yi; China	Rassim Mologly; Kazakhstan
10 m running target team	Kazakhstan; Bakhtiyar Ibrayev; Rassim Mologly; Alexey Zenta	Vietnam; Nguyễn Mạnh Cường; Nguyễn Văn Tùng; Trần Hoàng Vũ	Qatar; Mohammed Abouteama; Khalid Al-Kuwari; Mohammed Amin Sobhi
10 m running target mixed	Wang Yi; China	Bakhtiyar Ibrayev; Kazakhstan	Jeong You-jin; South Korea
10 m running target mixed team	Kazakhstan; Bakhtiyar Ibrayev; Rassim Mologly; Alexey Zenta	Vietnam; Nguyễn Mạnh Cường; Nguyễn Văn Tùng; Trần Hoàng Vũ	Qatar; Mohammed Abouteama; Khalid Al-Kuwari; Mohammed Amin Sobhi

=== Women ===
Event	Gold	Silver	Bronze
10 m air pistol	Kim Byung-hee; South Korea	Tsai Chia-hui; Chinese Taipei	Otryadyn Gündegmaa; Mongolia
10 m air pistol team	Mongolia; Tömörchödöriin Bayarmaa; Otryadyn Gündegmaa; Tsogbadrakhyn Mönkhzul	Kazakhstan; Zauresh Baibussinova; Galina Belyayeva; Yuliya Bondareva	Chinese Taipei; Chiu Tzu-tung; Huang Yi-ling; Tsai Chia-hui
10 m air rifle	Li Chunbao; China	Tejaswini Sawant; India	Suma Shirur; India
10 m air rifle team	India; Deepali Deshpande; Tejaswini Sawant; Suma Shirur	South Korea; Choi Dae-young; Kim Sun-hwa; Lee Mun-hee	Thailand; Sasithorn Hongprasert; Puchaya Pusuwan; Kusuma Tavisri
10 m running target	Natalya Gurova; Kazakhstan	Đặng Hồng Hà; Vietnam	Anna Pushkaryova; Kazakhstan
10 m running target team	Kazakhstan; Aigul Bektenova; Natalya Gurova; Anna Pushkaryova	Vietnam; Cù Thị Thanh Tú; Đặng Hồng Hà; Nguyễn Thị Lệ Quyên	Thailand; Chutima Aromruang; Manassanant Minghthangsatit; Pakasorn Ngansucharit
10 m running target mixed	Cù Thị Thanh Tú; Vietnam	Natalya Gurova; Kazakhstan	Anna Pushkaryova; Kazakhstan
10 m running target mixed team	Vietnam; Cù Thị Thanh Tú; Đặng Hồng Hà; Nguyễn Thị Lệ Quyên	Kazakhstan; Aigul Bektenova; Natalya Gurova; Anna Pushkaryova	Thailand; Chutima Aromruang; Manassanant Minghthangsatit; Pakasorn Ngansucharit

== Medal table ==
Rank	Nation	Gold	Silver	Bronze	Total
1	Kazakhstan	6	4	3	13
2	India	3	2	1	6
3	Vietnam	2	4	0	6
4	South Korea	2	1	1	4
5	China	2	1	0	3
6	Mongolia	1	0	1	2
7	Thailand	0	2	4	6
8	Chinese Taipei	0	1	1	2
9	Uzbekistan	0	1	0	1
10	Qatar	0	0	2	2
11	Bangladesh	0	0	1	1
11	Japan	0	0	1	1
11	Kuwait	0	0	1	1
Totals (13 entries)		16	16	16	48
