= Shooting at the 2010 Commonwealth Games – Men's 25 metre centre fire pistol pairs =

The Men's 25 metre centre fire pistol pairs event of the 2010 Commonwealth Games took place on 9 October 2010, at the CRPF Campus.

== Results ==
Rank	Name	Country	Precision	Rapid	Ind. total	Total
1st place, gold medalist(s)	Vijay Kumar	India	294	292	586^{26}	1159^{45}
1st place, gold medalist(s)	Harpreet Singh	India	289	284	573^{13}	1159^{45}
2nd place, silver medalist(s)	Greg Yelavich	New Zealand	289	275	574^{18}	1140^{35}
2nd place, silver medalist(s)	Alan Earle	New Zealand	286	280	566^{17}	1140^{35}
3rd place, bronze medalist(s)	Bin Gai	Singapore	292	284	576^{23}	1139^{40}
3rd place, bronze medalist(s)	Lip Poh	Singapore	286	277	563^{17}	1139^{40}
4	Metodi Igorov	Canada	281	292	573^{17}	1136^{32}
4	Alan Markewicz	Canada	278	285	563^{15}	1136^{32}
5	Hasli Amir Hasan	Malaysia	283	291	574^{17}	1133^{29}
5	Khalel Abdullah	Malaysia	276	283	559^{12}	1133^{29}
6	Mustaqeem Shah	Pakistan	285	281	566^{15}	1126^{30}
6	Irshad Ali	Pakistan	282	278	560^{15}	1126^{30}
7	Alan Green	Wales	284	285	569^{12}	1125^{18}
7	Steve Pengelly	Wales	278	278	556^{6}	1125^{18}
8	Mick Gault	England	293	275	568^{19}	1124^{35}
8	Iqbal Ubhi	England	287	269	556^{16}	1124^{35}
9	Robert Doak	Northern Ireland	283	276	559^{12}	1118^{22}
9	Hugh Stewart	Northern Ireland	281	278	559^{10}	1118^{22}
10	Roger Daniel	Trinidad and Tobago	279	287	566^{17}	1118^{21}
10	Rhodney Allen	Trinidad and Tobago	279	273	552^{4}	1118^{21}
11	David Moore	Australia	284	282	566^{14}	1117^{24}
11	Michelangelo Giustiniano	Australia	277	274	551^{10}	1117^{24}
12	Junior Benskin	Barbados	275	279	554^{12}	1101^{20}
12	Chester Foster	Barbados	275	272	547^{8}	1101^{20}
13	Stephen Ryan	Norfolk Island	268	267	535^{11}	1028^{13}
13	Graham Cock	Norfolk Island	239	254	493^{2}	1028^{13}
