= 2008 Asian Airgun Championships =

Shooting championships

- Host city: Nanjing, China
- Dates: 4–9 April 2008
- Main venue: Fangshan Sports Training Centre

The 2008 Asian Airgun Championships were held in Nanjing, China between April 4 and 9, 2008.

== Medal summary ==
=== Men ===
Event	Gold	Silver	Bronze
10 m air pistol	Xu Kun; China	Jakkrit Panichpatikum; Thailand	Mai Jiajie; China
10 m air pistol team	China; Li Huaiyu; Mai Jiajie; Xu Kun	South Korea; Choi Young-rae; Kim Joon-hyuk; Kim Yeong-koo	India; Samaresh Jung; Amanpreet Singh; Vivek Singh
10 m air rifle	Lin Yun; China	Li Jie; China	Shen Kai; China
10 m air rifle team	China; Li Jie; Lin Yun; Shen Kai	India; Abhinav Bindra; Gagan Narang; P. T. Raghunath	South Korea; Choi Sung-soon; Suk Gyu-nam; Yoon Jae-young

=== Women ===
Event	Gold	Silver	Bronze
10 m air pistol	Sun Rongli; China	Tsogbadrakhyn Mönkhzul; Mongolia	Otryadyn Gündegmaa; Mongolia
10 m air pistol team	Mongolia; Natsagdorjiin Ganchimeg; Otryadyn Gündegmaa; Tsogbadrakhyn Mönkhzul	Chinese Taipei; Huang Yi-ling; Lee Pei-ching; Tien Chia-chen	China; Sun Rongli; Wang Dehui; Yuan Jing
10 m air rifle	Zhang Yi; China	Jasmine Ser; Singapore	Anjali Bhagwat; India
10 m air rifle team	India; Priya Agarwal; Anjali Bhagwat; Suma Shirur	Singapore; Carol Lee; Jasmine Ser; Zhou Peixuan	China; Li Peijing; Yang Xiaolei; Zhang Yi

== Medal table ==
Rank	Nation	Gold	Silver	Bronze	Total
1	China	6	1	4	11
2	India	1	1	2	4
3	Mongolia	1	1	1	3
4	Singapore	0	2	0	2
5	South Korea	0	1	1	2
6	Chinese Taipei	0	1	0	1
6	Thailand	0	1	0	1
Totals (7 entries)		8	8	8	24
