= Patricia Wilka =

Paraguayan pistol shooter (born 1972)

Personal information
- Full name: Patricia Elizabeth Wilka Materi de Battilana
- Nickname: Pati
- Nationality: Paraguay
- Born: 3 September 1972 (age 54) Asunción, Paraguay
- Height: 1.65 m (5 ft 5 in)
- Weight: 75 kg (165 lb)

Sport
- Sport: Shooting
- Event: 10 m air pistol

Patricia Elizabeth Wilka Materi de Battilana (born September 3, 1972 in Asunción) is a Paraguayan pistol shooter. At age thirty-five, Wilka made her official debut at the 2008 Summer Olympics in Beijing, where she competed in the women's 10 m air pistol shooting. She finished in last place out of forty-four shooters in the qualifying rounds, after she was forced to retire in her third attempt, with a total score of 208 points.
