= Liubov Yaskevich =

Russian sport shooter

Lyubov Ilyinichna Yaskevich (Russian: Любовь Ильинична Яскевич; born 17 April 1985) is a Russian female sport shooter. At the 2012 Summer Olympics, she competed in the Women's 10 metre air pistol, finishing fourth, 0.6 of a point behind bronze medalist Olena Kostevych. She was born in Kemerovo, Russia (then Soviet Union).
