= Mauro Badaracchi =

Italian sport shooter

Personal information
- Nationality: Italy
- Born: 20 July 1984 (age 42) Tivoli, Rome, Italy
- Height: 1.80 m (5 ft 11 in)
- Weight: 83 kg (183 lb)

Sport
- Sport: Shooting
- Event: 10 m air pistol (AP60)
- Club: Gruppo Sportivo Forestale
- Coached by: Vincenzo Spilotro

Mauro Badaracchi (born 20 July 1984 in Tivoli, Rome) is an Italian sport shooter. He won two gold medals for the air pistol at the 2008 ISSF World Cup in Rio de Janeiro, Brazil, and at the 2010 ISSF World Cup in Belgrade, Serbia, accumulating scores of 684.4 and 685.9 points, respectively. Badaracchi is a member of the shooting team for Gruppo Sportivo Forestale, and is coached and trained by Vincenzo Spilotro.

Badaracchi represented Italy at the 2008 Summer Olympics in Beijing, where he competed in the men's 10 m air pistol, along with his teammate Vigilio Fait. He finished only in fortieth place by one point behind New Zealand's Yang Wang from the fourth attempt, for a total score of 571 targets.
