= Sandra Kolly =

Swiss sport shooter

Personal information
- Nationality: Switzerland
- Born: 28 August 1974 (age 51) Fribourg, Switzerland
- Height: 1.73 m (5 ft 8 in)
- Weight: 68 kg (150 lb)

Sport
- Sport: Shooting
- Event(s): 10 m air pistol (AP40); 25 m pistol (SP)
- Club: Pistolenlub Giffers
- Coached by: Alfons Rumons

Sandra Kolly (born 28 August 1974 in Fribourg) is a Swiss sport shooter. She won two medals, gold and bronze, in both air and sport pistol at the 2008 ISSF World Cup series in Rio de Janeiro, Brazil, accumulating scores of 484.8 and 784 points, respectively. Kolly is also a member of Pistolenlub Giffers and is coached and trained by Alfons Rumons.

Kolly represented Switzerland at the 2008 Summer Olympics in Beijing, where she competed in two pistol shooting events. She placed twenty-seventh out of forty-four shooters in the women's 10 m air pistol, by two points ahead of Italy's Maura Genovesi from the third attempt, with a total score of 378 targets. Three days later, Kolly competed for her second event, 25 m pistol, where she was able to shoot 289 targets in the precision stage, and 285 in the rapid fire, for a total score of 574 points, finishing only in twenty-ninth place.
