= Mira Suhonen =

Finnish sport shooter

Mira Suhonen (née Nevansuu; born 9 July 1985, in Kuortane) is a Finnish sport shooter, mainly competing in 10 metre pistol. Her best result has been a silver medal at the 2007 European Shooting Championship. She has participated in the Summer Olympics twice. In 2008, she finished 7th, but in 2012, she failed to reach the final.
