= Morgan Hicks =

American sport shooter

Personal information
- Full name: Morgan Hicks
- Nationality: United States
- Born: March 22, 1982 (age 44) Tacoma, Washington, U.S.
- Home town: Roy, Washington, U.S.
- Height: 5 ft 7 in (1.70 m)
- Weight: 154 lb (70 kg)

Sport
- Sport: Shooting
- Events: 10 m air rifle (AR40); 50 m rifle 3 positions (STR3X20)
- Club: Murray State University
- Coached by: Cindy Estep; David Johnson (national)

Morgan Hicks (born March 22, 1982, in Tacoma, Washington) is an American sport shooter. She has competed for Team USA, as a 22-year-old, in small-bore rifle shooting at the 2004 Summer Olympics, and has won a gold medal in the rifle three positions at the 2008 ISSF World Cup meet in Rio de Janeiro, Brazil. Outside her world and Olympic career, Hicks was an eight-time All-American for Murray State University from 2000 to 2004, where she became the NCAA air rifle champion on her senior season. While at Murray, she was a member of the National Residence Hall Honorary society.

Hicks started out as a successful junior on the U.S. national team for three years, and eventually earned her first small-bore rifle title at the 2001 Championship of the Americas tournament in Fort Benning, Georgia.

In early 2004, Hicks added an individual NCAA air rifle title to her career tally in her senior season, while competing for the Murray State University. Just two months later, Hicks qualified for her first and only U.S. Olympic team in the 50 m rifle 3 positions at the 2004 Summer Olympics in Athens, after placing second at the trials in Fort Benning. A less experienced to the international scene, Hicks marked 197 in prone, 189 in standing, and 191 in the kneeling series to put up a much steadfast aim in twelfth out of 33 shooters with a total score of 577, having been close to an Olympic final cutoff by a two-point margin.

Since 2007, Hicks currently serves as a full-time rifle coach for the University of Nebraska–Lincoln's shooting roster, and a representative for the USA Shooting Board of Directors Athletic Rifle Association.
