= Norayr Bakhtamyan =

Armenian sport shooter (born 1970)

Medal record

Representing Armenia

Men's Shooting

World Cup
| Silver medal – second place | 2008 Bangkok | Men's 10 metre air pistol |

Norayr Bakhtamyan (Armenian: Նորայր Բախտամյան, born November 1, 1970, in Yerevan, Armenian SSR) is an Armenian sport shooter. He competes in the men's 10 metre air pistol and men's 50 metre free pistol. Bakhtamyan is an Armenian Champion, World Cup silver medalist and three-time Olympian.

== Biography ==
Norayr Bakhtamyan was born on November 1, 1970, in Yerevan, Armenian SSR. From childhood, he loved to play with guns. He first got involved in shooting in 1985. Bakhtamyan began shooting under Khoren Igityan. Bakhtamyan credits Igityan for teaching him patience, calmness and a lot more. Now his personal coach is the head coach and honored coach of Armenia, Seyran Nikoghosyan. Bakhtamyan is married. He dedicates his success to his family, because they are his inspiration.

Bakhtamyan won the Shooting Championships of Armenia many times. In 2004, at the 2004 Summer Olympics in Athens, Bakhtamyan came in 4th place in the 50 metre free pistol. This is his best Olympic proformence to date. He also came in seventh place in the 10 metre air pistol. At the 2008 Summer Olympics in Beijing, Bakhtamyan did not advance to the finals. In 2011, at the World Cup in Sydney, he was second and received the opportunity to go to the Olympic Games in London. In 2012, he was fourth in the World Cup in the double. In February 2012, at the winter the European Championships in the Finnish city Verumayki, he scored 679.6 points and took 6th place. Bakhtamyan did not make it to the finals in either of his events at the 2012 Summer Olympics.
