= Sławomira Szpek =

Polish sport shooter

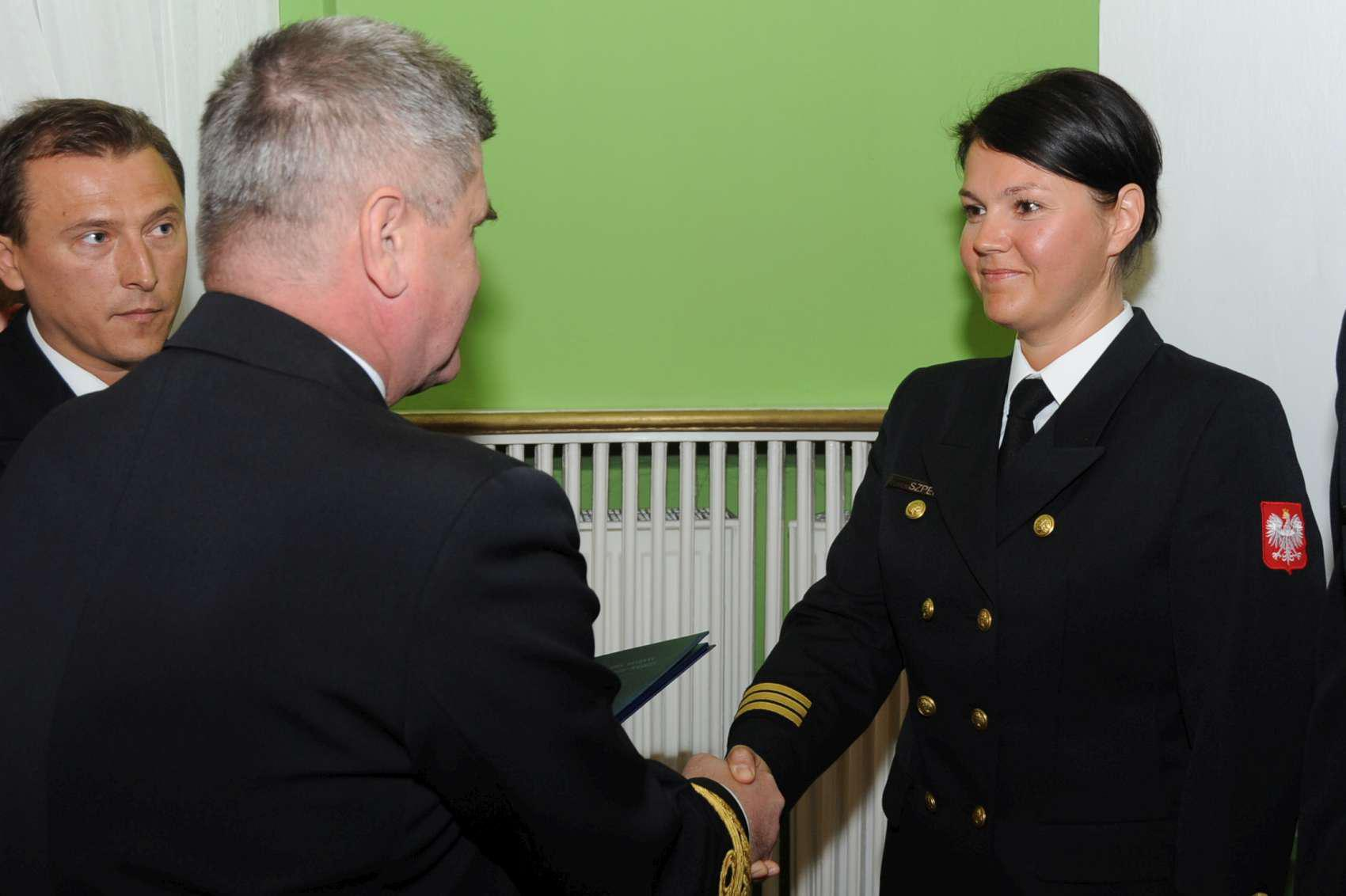

Personal information
- Nationality: Poland
- Born: 29 March 1974 (age 52) Gdynia, Poland
- Height: 1.72 m (5 ft 7 1/2 in)
- Weight: 65 kg (143 lb)

Sport
- Sport: Shooting
- Event(s): 10 m air pistol (AP40); 25 m pistol (SP)
- Club: WKS Flota Gdynia
- Coached by: Jolanta Samulewicz

Sławomira Szpek (born March 29, 1974, in Gdynia) is a Polish sport shooter. She won a silver medal for the 25 m pistol (SP) at the third meet of the 2008 ISSF World Cup in Munich, Germany, with a score of 785.7 points.

At age thirty-four, Szpek made her official debut for the 2008 Summer Olympics in Beijing, where she competed in two pistol shooting events. She placed thirtieth out of forty-four shooters in the women's 10 m air pistol, with a total score of 378 points. Three days later, Szpek competed for her second event, 25 m pistol, where she was able to shoot 283 targets in the precision stage, and 292 in the rapid fire, for a total score of 575 points, finishing only in twenty-seventh place.

Sławomira Szpek is the Polish Navy officer (porucznik marynarki).

Olympic results
Event	2008	2012
25 metre pistol	27th 575	–
10 metre air pistol	30th 378	–
