= Tong Xin =

Chinese sport shooter

Tong Xin (born 1982) is a female Chinese sport shooter. She competes in the 25 metre pistol and 10 metre air pistol, of which she has been most successful in the latter. She placed sixth in the 2005 ISSF World Cup Final and has won three medals at World Cup events: a silver in Changwon 2005, a gold in Changwon 2009 and a silver in Munich 2009.
