= Kristina Vestveit =

Norwegian sport shooter (born 1986)

Personal information
- Full name: Kristina Iren Vestveit
- Born: 24 August 1986 (age 39) Bærum, Norway
- Height: 169 cm (5 ft 7 in)
- Weight: 73 kg (161 lb)
Medal record
300 m Rifle
ISSF European Shooting Championships
Bronze medal – third place	2005 Belgrade	300 m Rifle, three positions

Kristina Iren Vestveit (born 24 August 1986) is a Norwegian rifle shooter. She was selected to represent Norway during the 2008 Summer Olympics in Beijing. The Norwegian Shooting Federation had suggested to select Ingrid Stubsjøen, but Olympiatoppen selected Vestveit instead after good performances in the final World Cup event of the 2008 season.

Vestveit received her first international senior medal when she was only 18 years old, when she won the bronze medal in the 300 m Rifle Three Positions event during the European Championships in Belgrade 2005. A year later she became junior World Champion in 50 m Rifle Three Positions during the 2006 ISSF World Shooting Championships in Zagreb.
