= Lin Zhongzai =

Chinese sport shooter (born 1981)

Medal record

Men's shooting

Representing China

Asian Championships
Gold medal – first place	2007 Kuwait City	50 m pistol team

Lin Zhongzai (born 29 August 1981 in Fu'an, Ningde, Fujian) is a male Chinese sports shooter, who competed for Team China at the 2008 Summer Olympics.

== Major performances ==
- 2005 World Cup Germany - 1st pistol;
- 2007 World Cup Final - 1st pistol;
- 2008 "Good Luck Beijing" ISSF World Cup - 1st pistol
