= Ole Magnus Bakken =

Norwegian sport shooter (born 1988)

Ole Magnus Bakken (born 28 April 1988 in Hamar) is a Norwegian sport shooter. He competed at the 2012 Summer Olympics in the Men's 10 metre air rifle and 50 m rifle prone.
