= Adéla Bruns =

Czech sport shooter (born 1987)

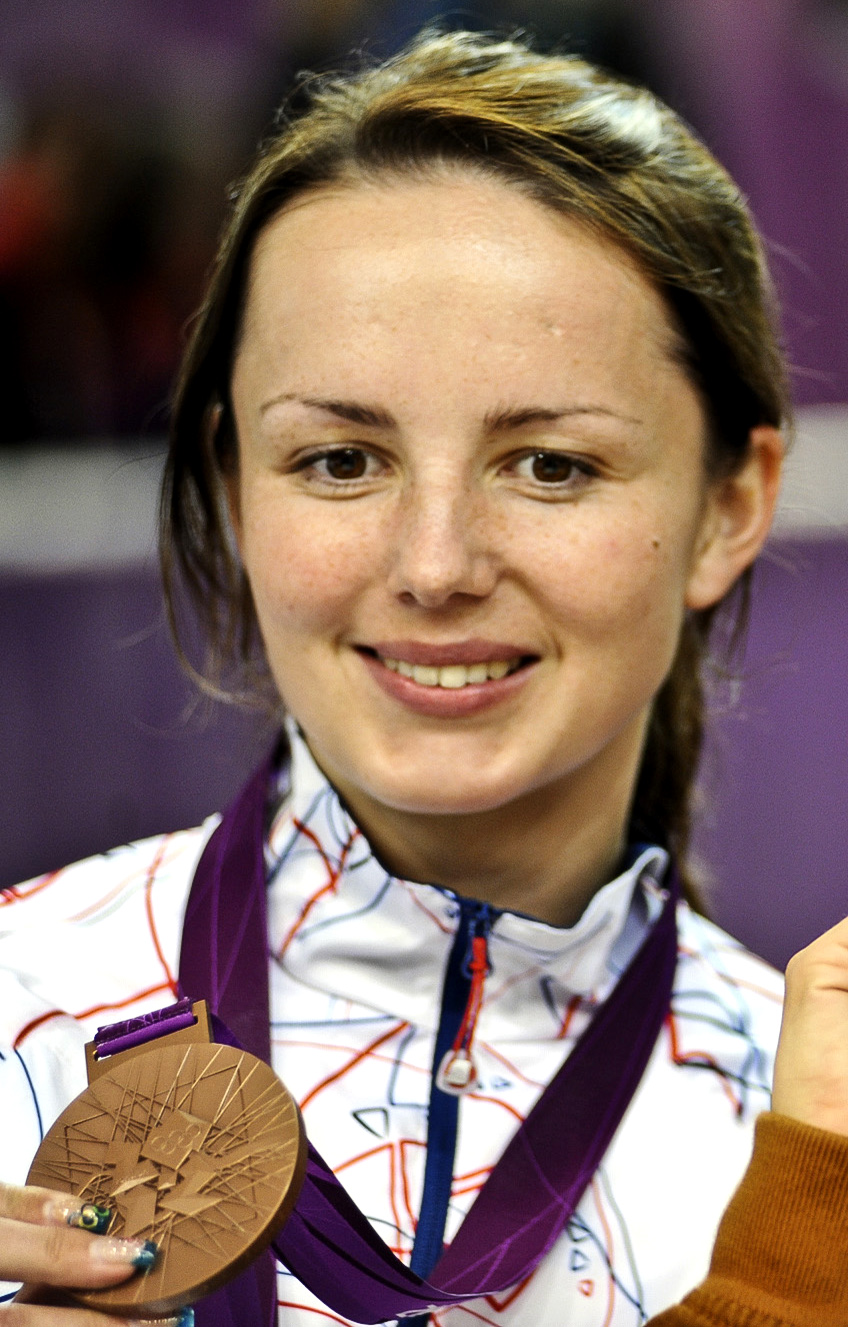

Personal information
- Nationality: Czech
- Born: 5 February 1987 (age 39) Zlín, Czechoslovakia
- Height: 5 ft 7 in (170 cm)
- Weight: 57 kg (126 lb)

Sport
- Country: Czech Republic
- Sport: Sport shooting
- Club: Ministry of the Interior Sports Club, Plzeň, Czech Republic
- Coached by: Milan Bakeš
Medal record
Olympic Games
Bronze medal – third place	2012 London	STR3X20

Adéla Bruns, née Sýkorová (Czech pronunciation: [ˈadɛːla ˈsiːkorovaː]; born 5 February 1987) is a Czech sport shooter. She competed at the 2008 Summer Olympics and in both the Women's 10 metre air rifle and Women's 50 metre rifle three positions events at the 2012 Summer Olympics. In the latter event, she won the bronze medal.

== Olympic results ==
Event	2008	2012	2016
50 metre rifle three positions	19th 578	(bronze) Bronze; 584+99.0	7th 582+404.3
10 metre air rifle	—	31st 392	32nd 411.8
