= Natalia Paderina =

Russian sport shooter

Olympic medal record

Women's Shooting

Representing Russia
| Silver medal – second place | 2008 Beijing | 10m air pistol |

Natalia Paderina née Natalia Akhmertdinova (born November 1, 1975, in Sverdlovsk, Russian SFSR, Soviet Union) is a Russian sport shooter. She won the silver medal in Women's 10m air pistol at the 2008 Summer Olympics. At that event, she shared the podium with bronze medalist Nino Salukvadze of Georgia. Georgia and Russia were at war at the time. They hugged and shook hands, which was seen as a peaceful gesture.

Olympic results
| Event | 2004 | 2008 | 2012 |
|---|---|---|---|
| 25 metre pistol | 23rd 572 | 19th 579 | — |
| 10 metre air pistol | 5th 386+95.9 | (silver) Silver; 391+98.1 | 37th 375 |
