= Michela Suppo =

Italian sports shooter

Personal information
- Nationality: Italian
- Born: 20 September 1971 (age 55) Turin, Italy

Sport
- Sport: Sports shooting

Michela Suppo (born 20 September 1971) is an Italian sports shooter. She competed at the 1992 Summer Olympics and the 1996 Summer Olympics.
