= Stéphanie Tirode =

French sport shooter

Personal information
- Born: 1 May 1975 (age 51) Chennevières-sur-Marne, France
- Height: 1.63 m (5 ft 4 in)
- Weight: 78 kg (172 lb)

Stéphanie Tirode (born 1 May 1975) is a French female sport shooter. At the 2012 Summer Olympics, she competed in the Women's 10 metre air pistol.
