= Lidija Mihajlović =

Serbian sport shooter

Medal record

Women's Shooting

Representing Yugoslavia

European Championships
Silver medal – second place	1994 Strasbourg	10 m air rifle

Lidija Mihajlović (Serbian Cyrillic: Лидија Михајловић; born 23 September 1968) is a Serbian sport shooter.

Mihajlović was born in Niš (SR Serbia, SFR Yugoslavia) and began her shooting career at SK "NIŠ 1881" in her native city. She is currently coached by Zoran Stojiljković.

She has participated at the 1992 Summer Olympics in Barcelona as an Independent Olympic Participant, due to the country of FR Yugoslavia being under United Nations sanctions which prevented the country from taking part in the Olympics. However, individual Yugoslav athletes were allowed to take part as Independent Olympic Participants. She represented Serbia at the 2008 Summer Olympics in Beijing, People's Republic of China, as she gained qualification for two different events. She finished 7th in the 50 metre rifle three positions event.

During her career, she has won five international medals (four silver, one gold) and also two European medals (one silver, one bronze).

Mihajlović gained her qualification to the 2008 Summer Olympics by taking 4th place at the 2006 ISSF World Shooting Championships in Zagreb, Croatia.

Olympic results
Event	1992	1996	2000	2004	2008
50 metre rifle three positions	33rd 565	—	—	—	7th 586+100.0
10 metre air rifle	17th 389	—	—	—	20th 394
