= Kim Eun-hye (sport shooter) =

South Korean sport shooter

Personal information
- Born: 8 May 1987 (age 39)

Sport
- Sport: Sports shooting

Kim Eun-hye (born 8 May 1987) is a South Korean sports shooter. She competed in the women's 10 metre air rifle event at the 2016 Summer Olympics.
