= Otryadyn Gündegmaa =

Mongolian sport shooter (born 1978)

Personal information
- Native name: Отрядын Гүндэгмаа
- Nationality: Mongolia
- Born: 23 May 1978 (age 48) Ulaanbaatar, Mongolia
- Height: 168 cm (5 ft 6 in)
- Weight: 59 kg (130 lb)
- Spouse: Khashbaataryn Tsagaanbaatar

Sport
- Country: Mongolia
- Sport: Shooting
- Events: 10 m air pistol (AP40); 25 m pistol (SP)
- Club: Champion Shooting Club
- Coached by: Undralbat Lkhagva

Achievements and titles
- Personal best: Olympic Games
Medal record
Women's shooting
Representing Mongolia
Olympic Games
Silver medal – second place	2008 Beijing	25 m pistol
World Championships
Silver medal – second place	2014 Granada	25 m center fire pistol team
Bronze medal – third place	2006 Zagreb	25 m pistol
Bronze medal – third place	1998 Barcelona	25 m center fire pistol team
World Cup Final
Gold medal – first place	2006 Granada	25 m pistol
Asian Championships
Silver medal – second place	2015 Kuwait	10 m air pistol
Silver medal – second place	2019 Doha	25 m pistol
Silver medal – second place	2007 Kuwait	25 m pistol team
Bronze medal – third place	2015 Kuwait	25 m pistol team
Asian Airgun Championships
Silver medal – second place	2017 Wako	10 m air pistol
Gold medal – first place	2008 Nanjing	10 m air pistol team
Bronze medal – third place	2008 Nanjing	10 m air pistol
Gold medal – first place	2005 Bangkok	10 m air pistol team
Bronze medal – third place	2005 Bangkok	10 m air pistol

Otryadyn Gündegmaa (Mongolian: Отрядын Гүндэгмаа; born 23 May 1978) is a Mongolian sport shooter. She competed in 10 m and 25 m pistol events at the 1996, 2000, 2004, 2008 and 2012 Summer Olympics, and had her best results in the 25 pistol, winning a silver medal in 2008 and placing fifth-sixth in 1996–2004.

Olympic results
Event	1996	2000	2004	2008	2012	2016	2020
25 metre pistol	5th 580+101.3	6th 581+99.9	6th 583+100.4	(silver) Silver; 590+102.2	27th 577	12th 579	26th 578
10 metre air pistol	30th 372	9th 382	16th 380	12th 382	18th 380	20th 379	30th 568

World Championship
Event	Barcelona 1998	2002 ISSF World Shooting Championships	2006 ISSF World Shooting Championships	2010 ISSF World Shooting Championships	2014 ISSF World Shooting Championships
25 meter pistol	44th 570	13th 578	3rd 581+204.2=785.2	23rd 579	13th 581 2nd (team)
10 meter air pistol	24th 378	26th 378	10th 383	31st 379	35th 378

Records
Event	25 meter pistol	10 meter air pistol	Final
2008 Summer Olympics	590 – OR		
2016 ISSF World Cup Thailand		391 – AR	
