= Mirosława Sagun-Lewandowska =

Polish sport shooter

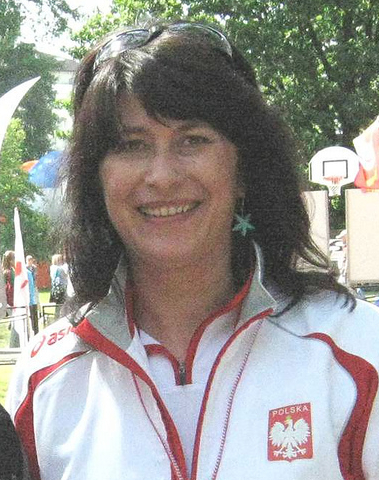
Mirosława Sagun-Lewandowska.

Mirosława Sagun-Lewandowska (born September 29, 1970, in Słupsk) is a multiple air gun champion of Poland, double champion of Europe and competed in three Olympic Games: Barcelona 1992, Sydney 2000 and Beijing 2008. Her club is Gryf Słupsk, and Sagun-Lewandowska also represented Legia Warszawa.

She began shooting in 1985, and four years later, she was two-times junior champion of the world in the 40 shots competition, as an individually and in team (Sarajevo, 1989). Later on, she won bronze at the Championships of Europe in Copenhagen. She holds the national record of Poland, established in 1997 (391 points out of 400 points).

Sagun-Lewandowska was the 1998 champion of Europe (Tallinn) and 2000 (Munich), in 1997 in Warsaw she won silver, and three times won bronze. At the 1992 Summer Olympics she was eight overall, in the 2000 Summer Olympics she finished 16-20 and in the 2008 Summer Olympics, she was fifth. She never won an Olympic medal..

Olympic results
Event	1992	1996	2000	2004	2008
25 metre pistol	—	—	—	—	30th 574
10 metre air pistol	8th 381+96.8	—	16th 379	—	5th 384+97.3
