= Ren Jie =

Chinese sport shooter (born 1980)

Medal record

Women's shooting

Representing China

Asian Championships
Gold medal – first place	2007 Kuwait City	10 m air pistol team

Ren Jie (simplified Chinese: 任洁; traditional Chinese: 任潔; pinyin: Rén Jié; born February 8, 1980, in Baoding, Hebei) is a female Chinese sports shooter who competed in 10 metre air pistol at the 2000 Summer Olympics, the 2004 Summer Olympics and the 2008 Summer Olympics. She reached the 2004 final and finished fourth.

== Olympic results ==
Event	2000	2004	2008
10 metre air pistol	16th 379	4th 384+98.3	19th 381
