= 2024 in shooting =

This article lists the main target shooting events and their results for 2024.

- 2024 ISSF Calendar here.

== World Events ==
=== Olympic & Paralympic Games ===
- July 25 – August 5: 2024 Summer Olympics in (France) Paris

=== International Shooting Sport Federation ===
- July 18–22: 2024 ISSF World Championships Target Sprint in (Germany) Dingolfing
- September 26 – October 7: 2024 ISSF Junior World Championships in (Peru) Lima

==== ISSF World Cup ====
- January 24 – February 1: Rifle/Pistol/Shotgun WC in (Egypt) Cairo
  - 10 m air rifle winners: (India) Divyansh Singh Panwar (m) / (Germany) Anna Janssen (f)
  - 10 m air rifle mixed winner: Great Britain
  - 50m rifle 3 positions winners: (Czech Republic) Jiří Přívratský (m) / (United Kingdom) Seonaid McIntosh (f)
  - 10 m air pistol winners: (South Korea) Lim Ho-jin (m) / (Greece) Anna Korakaki (f)
  - 10 m air pistol mixed winner: India
  - 25m pistol winner: (Germany) Doreen Vennekamp (f)
  - 25m rapid fire pistol winner: (South Korea) Song Jong-ho (m)
  - Skeet winners: (United States) Samantha Simonton (m) / (Egypt) Azmy Mehelba (f)
  - Skeet mixed team winners: Qatar
  - Trap winners: (Spain) Alberto Fernández (m) / (Kazakhstan) Mariya Dmitriyenko (f)
- February 4–13: Shotgun WC in (Morocco) Rabat
  - Skeet winners: (Italy) Tammaro Cassandro (m) / (Italy) Simona Scocchetti (f)
  - Skeet mixed team winners: United States
  - Trap winners: (Italy) Mauro De Filippis (m) / (Italy) Jessica Rossi (f)
- February 10–18: Rifle/Pistol 10m & Juniors 10m WC in (Spain) Granada
  - 10 m air rifle winners: (Czech Republic) Jiří Přívratský (m) / (South Korea) Kwon Eun-ji (f)
  - 10 m air rifle junior winners: (India) Umamahesh Maddineni (m) / (India) Isha Anil Taksale (f)
  - 10 m air rifle mixed winner: Germany (senior) / India (junior)
  - 10 m air pistol winners: (Slovakia) Juraj Tužinský (m) / (Poland) Klaudia Breś (f)
  - 10 m air pistol junior winners: (Kyrgyzstan) Imandos Bektenov (m) / (India) Devanshi Dhama (f)
  - 10 m air pistol mixed winner: Germany (senior) / Georgia (junior)
- May 1–12: Rifle/Pistol/Shotgun WC in (Azerbaijan) Baku
  - 10 m air rifle winners: (China) Sheng Lihao (m) / (South Korea) Keum Ji-hyeon (f)
  - 10 m air rifle mixed winner: China
  - Men 50m rifle 3 positions winners: (China) Liu Yukun (2 times)
  - Women 50m rifle 3 positions winners: (Germany) Anna Janssen (1st) / (United Kingdom) Seonaid McIntosh (2nd)
  - 10 m air pistol winners: (China) Xie Yu (m) / (France) Camille Jedrzejewski (f)
  - 10 m air pistol mixed winner: Turkey
  - 25m pistol winner: (Germany) Doreen Vennekamp (f)
  - Men 25m rapid fire pistol winner: (Czech Republic) Martin Podhráský (1st) / (China) Li Yuehong (2nd)
  - Women 25m rapid fire pistol winner: (South Korea) Yang Ji-in (1st) / (South Korea) Kim Ye-ji (2nd)
  - Skeet winners: (China) Lyu Jianlin (m) / (Australia) Austen Jewell Smith (f)
  - Skeet mixed team winners: Chile
  - Trap winners: (Australia) James Willett (m) / (Lebanon) Ray Bassil (f)
- May 17–19: Target Sprint WC in (Italy) Ora
- May 31 – June 7: Rifle/Pistol WC in (Germany) Munich
  - 10 m air rifle winners: (China) Sheng Lihao (m) / (China) Huang Yuting (f)
  - 10 m air rifle mixed winner: China
  - 50m rifle 3 positions winners: (Norway) Ole Martin Halvorsen (m) / (United Kingdom) Seonaid McIntosh (f)
  - 10 m air pistol winners: (India) Sarabjot Singh (m) / (Serbia) Zorana Arunović (f)
  - 10 m air pistol mixed winner: Turkey
  - Men 25m rapid fire pistol winner: (China) Li Yuehong
  - Women 25m pistol winner: (France) Camille Jedrzejewski
- June 10–19: Shotgun WC in (Italy) Lonato
  - Skeet winners: (Denmark) Jesper Hansen (m) / (Italy) Diana Bacosi (f)
  - Skeet mixed team winners: United States
  - Trap winners: (United Kingdom) Matthew Coward-Holley (m) / (Slovakia) Zuzana Rehák-Štefečeková (f)
- June 27 – July 1: Target Sprint WC in (Switzerland) Hombrechtikon
- July 9–16: Junior Shotgun WC in (Italy) Porpetto

==== ISSF Grand Prix ====
- January 9–14: 10m GP Ruse in (Slovenia) Ruse
  - 10 m air rifle winners: (Germany) Maximilian Ulbrich (m) / (Poland) Aneta Stankiewicz (f)
  - 10 m air rifle junior winners: (Hungary) Áron Rácz (m) / (Slovenia) Hana Strakušek (f)
  - 10 m air rifle mixed winner: Serbia
  - 10 m air pistol winners: (Slovakia) Juraj Tužinský (m) / (Greece) Anna Korakaki (f)
  - 10 m air pistol junior winners: (Romania) Luca Joldea (m) / (Armenia) Nare Gabrielyan (f)
  - 10 m air pistol mixed winner: Armenia
- April 19–21: Grand Prix Target Sprint in (Hungary) Hódmezővásárhely

==== Olympic Qualification Tournaments ====
- April 11–19: 2024 ISSF World Olympic Qualification Tournament (rifle & pistol) in (Brazil) Rio de Janeiro
- April 19–29: 2024 ISSF World Olympic Qualification Tournament (shotgun) in (Qatar) Doha

== Regional Events ==
=== Asia ===
- January 5–18: 2024 Asian Rifle/Pistol Championships in Jakarta
  - 10 m air pistol winners: (India) Varun Tomar (m) / (India) Esha Singh (w) / (Uzbekistan) Ilkhombek Obidjonov (mj) / (China) Jin Bohan (wj)
  - 10 m air pistol team winners: India (m) / India (w) / China (mj) / China (wj)
  - 10 m air rifle winners: (China) Ma Sihan (m) / (India) Nancy Nancy (w) / (China) Pan Bowen (mj) / (India) Isha Anil Taksale (wj)
  - 10 m air rifle team winners: South Korea (m) / India (w) / China (mj) / India (wj)
  - 25 m rapid fire pistol men winners: (Kazakhstan) Nikita Chiryukin / South Korea (team)
  - 25 m center fire pistol men winners: Yogesh Singh / India (team)
  - 25 m standard pistol men winners: Yogesh Singh / India (team)
  - 25 m pistol women winners: (Kazakhstan) Nikita Chiryukin / South Korea (team)
  - 50 m rifle 3 positions winners: (India) Akhil Sheoran (m) / (South Korea) Lee Eun-seo (w)
  - 50 m rifle 3 positions team winners: India (m) / India (w)
  - 50 m rifle prone winners: (China) Yu Hao (m) / (Kazakhstan) Arina Altukhova (w)
  - 50 m rifle prone team winners: China (m) / Kazakhstan (w)
  - 10 m air pistol mixed team winners: Vietnam (seniors) / China (juniors)
  - 10 m air rifle mixed team winners: India (seniors) / India (juniors)
  - 10 m running target winners: (Indonesia) Muhammad Sejahtera Dwi Putra (m) & (mixed m) / (Kazakhstan) Fatima Irnazarova (w) / (Qatar) Amal Mohamed Mhamud (mixed w)
  - 10 m running target team winners: Indonesia (m) / Indonesia (mixed m)
- January 12–22: 2024 Asian Shotgun Championships in Kuwait City
  - Trap winners: (Iran) Mohammad Beiranvand (m) / (Chinese Taipei) Liu Wan-yu (w) / (Lebanon) Ghassan Baaklini (mj)
  - Trap team winners: China (m) / China (w) / Kazakhstan (mixed) / Kazakhstan (mj)
  - Skeet winners: (Chinese Taipei) Lee Meng-yuan (m) / (China) Gao Jinmei (w) / (Uzbekistan) Bekhruz Sharapov (mj)
  - Skeet team winners: China (m) / India (w) / China (mixed) / Kazakhstan (mj)
- February 24 – March 3: 2024 European 10 m Events Championships in Győr
  - 10 m air pistol winners: (Italy) Paolo Monna (m) / (Moldova) Anna Dulce (w) / (Poland) Ivan Rakitski (mj) / (Georgia (country)) Mariami Prodiashvili (wj)
  - 10 m air rifle winners: (Slovakia) Patrik Jány (m) / (Germany) Anna Janssen (w) / (Hungary) Balint Kalman (mj) / (Norway) Synnøve Berg (wj)
  - 10 m air pistol mixed team winners: Ukraine (seniors) / Georgia (juniors)
  - 10 m air rifle mixed team winners: Germany (seniors) / Germany (juniors)
  - Air pistol trio winners: Turkey (m) / Hungary (w) / Ukraine (mj) / Germany (wj)
  - Air rifle trio winners: Ukraine (m) / Germany (w) / Germany (mj) / Germany (wj)
- February 29 – March 9: 2024 Shooting Championships of the Americas (shotgun) in (Dominican Republic) Santo Domingo
  - Trap winners: (United States) Derrick Mein (m) / (Guatemala) Waleska Soto (w)
  - Trap team winners: Guatemala (m) / United States (w) / Puerto Rico (mixed)
  - Skeet winners: (Guatemala) Sebastian Bermudez (m) / (Peru) Daniella Borda (w)
  - Skeet team winners: Guatemala (m) / (w) / United States (mixed)
- March 31 – April 7: 2024 Shooting Championships of the Americas (rifle & pistol) in (Argentina) Buenos Aires
- May 15–27: 2024 European Shotgun Championships in (Italy) Lonato

=== Europe ===
- May 20 – June 8: 2024 European Rifle & Pistol Championships in (Croatia) Osijek

== International Championships ==
- January 5–7: Skirca Open & Trzin Walther Cup in (Slovenia) Trzin
- January 19–21: Gundsølille Open 10 m events in (Denmark) Gundsølille
- January 23–28: H&N Cup in (Germany) Munich
- January 31 – February 2: Grand Prix of France in Fleury-les-Aubrais
- February 1–3: InterShoot in (Netherlands) Hague
- February 15–18: Denmark Open Air 2024 in Vildbjerg
- February 22 – March 1: Amir Grand Prix in (Qatar) Doha
- March 8–16: Cyprus SH Grand Prix in Larnaca
- March 16–23: ISAS 2024 in (Germany) Dortmund
- April 8–14: National Test Event for Paris in (France) Chateauroux
- May 17–19: 42nd Annual Canadian Airgun Grand Prix in (Canada) Cookstown
- May 17–20: 6th INTARSO Reflex Shooting Cup in (Belgium) Genk
- May 22 – June 9: Green Cup Shotgun in (Italy) Umbria
- May 25–26: Polar Grand Prix 2024 - Trap in (Finland) Orimattila
- June 7–9: ISSF Target Sprint Grand Prix of GER in Germany
- June 19–30: Emir Cup 2024 in (Italy) Umbria
- June 25 – July 8: Grand Prix Battle of Crete in (Greece) Chania
- June 28–30: 40 Gold Cup "Carlo Beretta" Trap in (Italy) Lonato del Garda
- July 8–15: Grand Prix "Gen Lavrov" 2024 in Bulgaria
- July 13–14: 11 Gold Cup Beretta Skeet in (Italy) Laterina
- September 7–16: Shotgun Grand Prix of Crete in (Greece) Chania
- September 20–30: Asian Shotgun Cup 2024 in (Kazakhstan) Almaty
- September 21–30: Taipei International Grand Prix Rifle/Pistol/Shotgun in (Chinese Taipei) Gong-Xi
- October 5–9: FISU World University Championship in (India) New Delhi
- November 22–24: Walter Youth Cup Rifle/Pistol in (Serbia) Smederevo
