= Shooting at the 2024 Summer Olympics =

Shooting at the Games of the XXXIII Olympiad
- Venue: National Shooting Centre, Châteauroux
- Dates: 27 July – 5 August 2024
- No. of events: 15 (6 men, 6 women, 3 mixed)
- Competitors: 340 (170 men and 170 women)

Shooting competitions at the 2024 Summer Olympics in Paris took place from 27 July to 5 August 2024 at the National Shooting Centre in Châteauroux. The number of shooters competing across fifteen events was reduced from 360 at the previous Games to 340, with an equal distribution between men and women. Furthermore, several significant changes were instituted in the Olympic shooting program, including the new final format and the substitution of the mixed team trap competitions with the mixed team skeet.

== Competition format ==
On 9 June 2017, the International Shooting Sport Federation welcomed the decision of the International Olympic Committee to approve several changes to the Olympic shooting program to enhance the sport's popularity and worldwide appeal. One of the significant changes in the program was replacing the mixed team trap competition with the mixed team skeet to maintain and attain gender equality in sports shooting. Other ratified changes included the reduction of athletes from 360 in Tokyo 2020 to 340 and the new elimination final format for each individual shooting event.

All shooters who advance to the Olympic finals of their individual events must start from scratch and hit a specific number of shots in the elimination stages. Four finalists will compete in each of the two elimination relays for the small-bore pistol and shotgun events, with the winner and runner-up proceeding to the medal rounds. For the rifle and air pistol events, the eight finalists will compete against each other until the elimination round leaves, with only two shooters battling out in a duel to decide the gold and silver medals.

== Qualification ==
In early 2022, the International Shooting Sport Federation agreed to change the rules on allocating the Olympic quota places, as it aims to attain gender equality. As a result, a total of 340 quota places, with an equal distribution between men and women, will be awarded at the top-level global and continental championships.

As per the guidelines from the International Shooting Sport Federation, the qualification period commences with the 2022 European Championships for shotgun events in Larnaca, Cyprus and for small-bore rifle and pistol events in Wrocław, Poland, which concludes on 18 September 2022, less than two years before the Olympics. Sixteen quota places will be assigned to the top two NOCs in each shooting event. For the remainder of the 2022 season, sixty more quota places will be awarded, including forty-eight from the separate rifle, pistol, and shotgun meets of the ISSF World Championships.

Throughout the process, quota places will be generally awarded when a shooter posts a top finish at the ISSF World Championships or the continental championships (Africa, Europe, Asia, Oceania, and the Americas).

After the qualification period concludes and all NOCs receive the official list of quota places, the ISSF will check the World Ranking list in each individual shooting event. The highest-ranked shooter, who has not qualified in any event and whose NOC does not have a berth in a specific event, will obtain a direct Olympic quota place.

Like the previous Games, host nation France is guaranteed twelve quota places, with one in each individual shooting event.

== Competition schedule ==
Legend
Q	Qualification	F	Final

Schedule
Event ↓ / Date →	Sat 27		Sun 28		Mon 29	Tue 30	Wed 31		Thu 1		Fri 2		Sat 3	Sun 4		Mon 5	
Rifle
Men's 10 m air rifle			Q		F												
Men's 50 m rifle 3 positions							Q		F								
Women's 10 m air rifle			Q		F												
Women's 50 m rifle 3 positions										Q		F					
Mixed 10 m air rifle team	Q	F															
Pistol
Men's 10 m air pistol	Q			F													
Men's 25 m rapid fire pistol														Q			F
Women's 10 m air pistol	Q			F													
Women's 25 m pistol											Q		F				
Mixed 10 m air pistol team					Q	F											
Shotgun
Men's trap					Q	F											
Men's skeet											Q		F				
Women's trap						Q		F									
Women's skeet													Q		F		
Mixed skeet team																Q	F

== Medal summary ==
A total of 45 medals were won by 19 NOC's.

=== Medal table ===
* Host nation (France)

Rank	NOC	Gold	Silver	Bronze	Total
1	China	5	2	3	10
2	South Korea	3	3	0	6
3	United States	1	3	1	5
4	Italy	1	2	1	4
5	Great Britain	1	1	0	2
6	Guatemala	1	0	1	2
6	Switzerland	1	0	1	2
8	Chile	1	0	0	1
8	Serbia	1	0	0	1
10	France*	0	1	0	1
10	Sweden	0	1	0	1
10	Turkey	0	1	0	1
10	Ukraine	0	1	0	1
14	India	0	0	3	3
15	Australia	0	0	1	1
15	Chinese Taipei	0	0	1	1
15	Croatia	0	0	1	1
15	Hungary	0	0	1	1
15	Kazakhstan	0	0	1	1
Totals (19 entries)		15	15	15	45

=== Men's events ===
Event	Gold	Silver	Bronze
10 metre air pistol	Xie Yu; China	Federico Nilo Maldini; Italy	Paolo Monna; Italy
25 metre rapid fire pistol	Li Yuehong; China	Cho Yeong-jae; South Korea	Wang Xinjie; China
10 metre air rifle	Sheng Lihao; China	Victor Lindgren; Sweden	Miran Maričić; Croatia
50 metre rifle three positions	Liu Yukun; China	Serhiy Kulish; Ukraine	Swapnil Kusale; India
Skeet	Vincent Hancock; United States	Conner Prince; United States	Lee Meng-yuan; Chinese Taipei
Trap	Nathan Hales; Great Britain	Qi Ying; China	Jean Pierre Brol; Guatemala

=== Women's events ===
Event	Gold	Silver	Bronze
10 metre air pistol	Oh Ye-jin; South Korea	Kim Ye-ji; South Korea	Manu Bhaker; India
25 metre pistol	Yang Ji-in; South Korea	Camille Jedrzejewski; France	Veronika Major; Hungary
10 metre air rifle	Ban Hyo-jin; South Korea	Huang Yuting; China	Audrey Gogniat; Switzerland
50 metre rifle three positions	Chiara Leone; Switzerland	Sagen Maddalena; United States	Zhang Qiongyue; China
Skeet	Francisca Crovetto; Chile	Amber Rutter; Great Britain	Austen Smith; United States
Trap	Adriana Ruano; Guatemala	Silvana Stanco; Italy	Penny Smith; Australia

=== Mixed events ===
Event	Gold	Silver	Bronze
10 metre air pistol team	Serbia; Zorana Arunović; Damir Mikec	Turkey; Şevval İlayda Tarhan; Yusuf Dikeç	India; Manu Bhaker; Sarabjot Singh
10 metre air rifle team	China; Huang Yuting; Sheng Lihao	South Korea; Keum Ji-hyeon; Park Ha-jun	Kazakhstan; Alexandra Le; Islam Satpayev
Skeet team	Italy; Diana Bacosi; Gabriele Rossetti	United States; Austen Smith; Vincent Hancock	China; Jiang Yiting; Lyu Jianlin

== See also ==
- Shooting at the 2022 Asian Games
- Shooting at the 2023 European Games
- Shooting at the 2023 Pan American Games
- Shooting at the 2024 Summer Paralympics
