= Shooting at the 2024 Summer Olympics – Women's 25 metre pistol =

Women's 25 metre pistol at the Games of the XXXIII Olympiad
- Olympic shooting pictogram
- Venue: National Shooting Centre, Châteauroux
- Dates: 2–3 August
- Competitors: 40 from 29 nations
- Winning score: 36

Medalists
1st place, gold medalist(s)		Yang Ji-in	South Korea
2nd place, silver medalist(s)		Camille Jedrzejewski	France
3rd place, bronze medalist(s)		Veronika Major	Hungary

The Women's 25 metre pistol event at the 2024 Summer Olympics took place on 2 and 3 August 2024 at the National Shooting Centre, Châteauroux.

== Records ==
Prior to this competition, the existing world and Olympic records were as follows.

Qualification records
World record	Rhythm Sangwan (IND)	595	Baku, Azerbaijan	13 May 2023
Olympic record	Zhang Jingjing (CHN)	592	Rio de Janeiro, Brazil	10 August 2016

Final records
World record	Kim Ye-ji (KOR)	42	Baku, Azerbaijan	10 May 2024
Olympic record	Vitalina Batsarashkina (ROC); Kim Min-jung (KOR)	38	Tokyo, Japan	30 July 2021

== Schedule ==
All times are Central European Summer Time (UTC+2)

Date	Time	Round
Friday, 2 August 2024	09:00	Qualification Precision
Friday, 2 August 2024	12:00	Qualification Rapid
Saturday, 3 August 2024	09:30	Final

== Results ==
=== Qualification ===
Rank	Athlete	Precision				Rapid				Total	Inner 10s	Notes
Rank	Athlete	1	2	3	Total	1	2	3	Total	Total	Inner 10s	Notes
1	Veronika Major (HUN)	96	100	98	294	100	98	100	298	592	27	Q, =OR
2	Manu Bhaker (IND)	97	98	99	294	100	98	98	296	590	24	Q
3	Hanieh Rostamian (IRI)	98	97	97	292	98	100	98	296	588	18	Q
4	Trịnh Thu Vinh (VIE)	97	96	97	290	100	98	99	297	587	25	Q
5	Zhao Nan (CHN)	95	97	99	291	97	99	99	295	586	19	Q
6	Yang Ji-in (KOR)	96	97	98	291	98	100	97	295	586	19	Q
7	Camille Jedrzejewski (FRA)	98	98	98	294	97	100	94	291	585	25	Q
8	Katelyn Abeln (USA)	94	97	99	290	98	98	99	295	585	19	Q
9	Liang Xiaoya (CHN)	97	98	94	289	98	98	99	295	584	23	
10	Andrea Pérez Peña (ECU)	97	96	98	291	94	99	99	292	583	19	
11	Antoaneta Kostadinova (BUL)	95	96	97	288	97	99	99	295	583	18	
12	Teh Xiu Hong (SGP)	97	98	98	293	96	98	96	290	583	17	
13	Doreen Vennekamp (GER)	95	97	97	289	98	98	98	294	583	15	
14	Sára Ráhel Fábián (HUN)	95	99	97	291	97	97	97	291	582	17	
15	Diana Durango (ECU)	94	95	96	285	98	98	100	296	581	22	
16	Tien Chia-chen (TPE)	96	97	97	290	98	98	95	291	581	18	
17	Sylvia Steiner (AUT)	95	96	95	286	99	98	98	295	581	17	
18	Esha Singh (IND)	95	96	100	291	97	96	97	290	581	17	
19	Tanyaporn Prucksakorn (THA)	97	93	99	289	95	98	98	291	580	20	
20	Alejandra Zavala (MEX)	97	98	95	290	97	97	96	290	580	17	
21	Şevval İlayda Tarhan (TUR)	95	96	96	287	96	98	98	292	579	20	
22	Kishmala Talat (PAK)	95	99	95	289	98	93	99	290	579	18	
23	Mathilde Lamolle (FRA)	95	96	96	287	96	96	99	291	578	21	
24	Laina Pérez (CUB)	96	96	97	289	97	97	94	288	577	14	
25	Olena Kostevych (UKR)	94	97	95	286	96	96	98	290	576	19	
26	Agate Rašmane (LAT)	99	93	96	288	96	98	94	288	576	17	
27	Kim Ye-ji (KOR)	97	96	97	290	98	89	98	285	575	25	
28	Şimal Yılmaz (TUR)	95	94	95	284	91	100	99	290	574	17	
29	Klaudia Breś (POL)	97	98	98	293	98	94	88	280	573	17	
30	Stina Lawner (SWE)	96	94	95	285	94	97	97	288	573	16	
31	Wu Chia-ying (TPE)	95	96	89	280	96	99	97	292	572	15	
32	Ada Korkhin (USA)	92	96	100	288	96	100	87	283	571	17	
33	Kamonlak Saencha (THA)	96	96	95	287	93	98	92	283	570	13	
34	Anna Korakaki (GRE)	90	91	94	275	98	98	99	295	570	12	
35	Elena Galiabovitch (AUS)	97	93	93	283	93	99	94	286	569	13	
36	Josefin Eder (GER)	91	97	91	279	97	97	96	290	569	12	
37	Manjola Konini (ALB)	94	94	90	278	97	96	98	291	569	10	
38	Nour Abbas Mohammed (EGY)	97	91	94	282	94	94	98	286	568	18	
39	Aliaksandra Piatrova (AIN)	95	98	95	288	97	91	90	278	566	14	
40	Nino Salukvadze (GEO)	91	92	94	277	95	95	96	286	563	16	

=== Final ===
Rank	Firing Point	Athlete	Series										S-off	Notes
Rank	Firing Point	Athlete	1	2	3	4	5	6	7	8	9	10	S-off	Notes
1st place, gold medalist(s)	F	Yang Ji-in (KOR)	3	8	13	17	20	24	27	30	32	36	+4	
2nd place, silver medalist(s)	J	Camille Jedrzejewski (FRA)	4	6	10	14	18	22	26	29	32	36	+1	
3rd place, bronze medalist(s)	A	Veronika Major (HUN)	2	6	10	14	19	21	25	28*	31	—N/a	+4	
4	G	Manu Bhaker (IND)	2	6	10	13	18	22	26	28*	—N/a		+3	
5	I	Zhao Nan (CHN)	3	6	10	14	17	21	23	—N/a				
6	B	Hanieh Rostamian (IRI)	4	7	9	14	17	19	—N/a					
7	D	Trịnh Thu Vinh (VIE)	4	7	10	13	16	—N/a						
8	E	Katelyn Abeln (USA)	1	3	5	5	—N/a							
