= Shooting at the 2024 Summer Olympics – Women's 10 metre air pistol =

Women's 10 metre air pistol at the Games of the XXXIII Olympiad
- Venue: National Shooting Centre, Châteauroux
- Dates: 27–28 July
- Competitors: 45 from 33 nations

Medalists
1st place, gold medalist(s)		Oh Ye-jin	South Korea
2nd place, silver medalist(s)		Kim Ye-ji	South Korea
3rd place, bronze medalist(s)		Manu Bhaker	India

The Women's 10 meter air pistol event at the 2024 Summer Olympics took place on 27–28 July 2024 at the National Shooting Centre, Châteauroux in France.

== Records ==
Prior to this competition, the existing world and Olympic records were as follows:

Qualification records
World record	Jiang Ranxin (CHN)	591	Cairo, Egypt	15 October 2022
Olympic record	Jiang Ranxin (CHN)	587	Tokyo, Japan	25 July 2021

Final records
World record	Zorana Arunović (SRB)	246.9	Maribor, Slovenia	11 March 2017
Olympic record	Vitalina Batsarashkina (RUS)	240.3	Tokyo, Japan	25 July 2021

== Schedule ==
All times are Central European Summer Time (UTC+2)

Date	Time	Round
Saturday, 27 July 2024	12:30	Qualification
Sunday, 28 July 2024	12:00	Final

== Results ==
=== Qualification ===
Rank	Shooter	Nation	1	2	3	4	5	6	Total	Inner 10s	Notes
1	Veronika Major	Hungary	95	98	96	97	97	99	582	22	Q
2	Oh Ye-jin	South Korea	96	97	99	97	95	98	582	20	Q
3	Manu Bhaker	India	97	97	98	96	96	96	580	27	Q
4	Trịnh Thu Vinh	Vietnam	97	94	96	97	100	94	578	26	Q
5	Kim Ye-ji	South Korea	98	96	95	98	96	95	578	16	Q
6	Li Xue	China	99	97	99	95	93	94	577	23	Q
7	Şevval İlayda Tarhan	Turkey	97	98	97	97	93	95	577	15	Q
8	Jiang Ranxin	China	98	94	95	95	99	96	577	13	Q
9	Elmira Karapetyan	Armenia	94	98	93	97	98	96	576	14	
10	Zorana Arunović	Serbia	96	96	95	96	96	96	575	19	
11	Irina Yunusmetova	Kazakhstan	93	96	95	96	98	96	574	19	
12	Hala El-Gohari	Egypt	95	98	95	95	95	96	574	15	
13	Liu Heng-yu	Chinese Taipei	97	97	95	96	97	91	573	20	
14	Klaudia Breś	Poland	95	95	95	95	96	97	573	14	
15	Rhythm Sangwan	India	97	92	97	96	95	96	573	14	
16	Antoaneta Kostadinova	Bulgaria	95	94	99	97	94	94	573	14	
17	Alejandra Zavala	Mexico	95	96	92	97	96	97	573	13	
18	Camille Jedrzejewski	France	94	95	94	97	96	97	573	12	
19	Olena Kostevych	Ukraine	94	95	97	96	96	94	572	19	
20	Doreen Vennekamp	Germany	94	97	96	95	93	97	572	12	
21	Tanyaporn Prucksakorn	Thailand	93	96	94	100	96	92	571	19	
22	Hanieh Rostamian	Iran	92	96	95	97	97	94	571	16	
23	Agate Rašmane	Latvia	94	94	95	95	95	97	570	16	
24	Katelyn Abeln	United States	97	94	95	94	94	96	570	16	
25	Alexis Lagan	United States	95	96	93	93	96	97	570	15	
26	Andrea Pérez Peña	Ecuador	96	96	94	95	97	91	569	16	
27	Sylvia Steiner	Austria	94	95	97	93	94	96	569	14	
28	Anna Dulce	Moldova	96	92	96	97	93	95	569	10	
29	Christina Moschi	Greece	95	92	96	96	94	96	569	7	
30	Josefin Eder	Germany	92	92	97	98	95	93	567	11	
31	Kishmala Talat	Pakistan	93	97	94	93	95	95	567	10	
32	Teh Xiu Hong	Singapore	91	91	98	97	95	95	567	8	
33	Sára Ráhel Fábián	Hungary	97	90	95	97	93	94	566	14	
34	Olfa Charni	Tunisia	90	90	97	95	97	96	565	10	
35	Yu Ai-wen	Chinese Taipei	93	96	94	94	93	94	564	18	
36	Kamonlak Saencha	Thailand	91	93	91	95	96	98	564	14	
37	Elena Galiabovitch	Australia	93	95	95	95	92	94	564	12	
38	Nino Salukvadze	Georgia	92	95	95	92	94	94	562	9	
39	Laina Pérez	Cuba	94	95	90	90	96	95	560	13	
40	Yasameen Al-Raimi	Yemen	91	92	93	95	96	92	559	9	
41	Diana Durango	Ecuador	89	95	92	94	97	91	558	9	
42	Şimal Yılmaz	Turkey	92	90	95	91	95	94	557	6	
43	Manjola Konini	Albania	93	95	92	90	92	87	549	11	
44	Anna Korakaki	Greece	90	93	94	27	Did not finish				
	Nour Abbas Mohammed	Egypt	Did not start								

=== Final ===
Rank	Shooter	Nation	1	2	3	4	5	6	7	8	9	Total	Notes
1st place, gold medalist(s)	Oh Ye-jin	South Korea	52.2	49.5	18.7	21.1	20.2	20.8	20.0	20.1	20.6	243.2	OR
2nd place, silver medalist(s)	Kim Ye-ji	South Korea	49.7	51.8	20.3	20.1	19.9	19.9	20.2	19.9	19.5	241.3	
3rd place, bronze medalist(s)	Manu Bhaker	India	50.4	49.9	20.9	19.6	20.1	20.3	20.1	20.4		221.7	
4	Trịnh Thu Vinh	Vietnam	49.3	50.1	20.8	20.6	19.1	18.9	19.8			198.6	
5	Li Xue	China	49.0	48.6	20.6	20.2	18.5	21.3				178.2	
6	Jiang Ranxin	China	46.5	49.7	20.2	19.6	20.5					156.5	
7	Şevval İlayda Tarhan	Turkey	47.9	49.4	20.1	18.2						135.6	
8	Veronika Major	Hungary	49.2	47.8	17.0							114.0	
