= Shooting at the 2022 Asian Games – Women's 25 metre pistol =

Women's 25 metre pistol at the 2022 Asian Games
- Venue: Fuyang Yinhu Sports Centre
- Dates: 26–27 September 2023
- Competitors: 44 from 17 nations

Medalists
gold medal	Liu Rui	China
silver medal	Esha Singh	India
bronze medal	Yang Ji-in	South Korea

The women's 25 metre pistol competition at the 2022 Asian Games in Hangzhou, China was held on 26 and 27 September 2023 at Fuyang Yinhu Sports Centre.

== Schedule ==
All times are China Standard Time (UTC+08:00)

Date	Time	Event
Tuesday, 26 September 2022	09:00	Qualification precision
Wednesday, 27 September 2023	09:00	Qualification rapid
Wednesday, 27 September 2023	14:30	Final

== Records ==
Prior to this competition, the existing world, Asian and Games records were as follows.

Qualification
World Record	Rhythm Sangwan (IND)	595	Baku, Azerbaijan	13 May 2023
Asian Record	Rhythm Sangwan (IND)	595	Baku, Azerbaijan	13 May 2023
Games Record	Manu Bhaker (IND)	593	Palembang, Indonesia	22 August 2018
Final
World Record	Veronika Major (HUN)	40	New Delhi, India	25 April 2018
Asian Record	Rahi Sarnobat (IND)	39	Osijek, Croatia	28 June 2021
Games Record	Rahi Sarnobat (IND); Naphaswan Yangpaiboon (THA)	34	Palembang, Indonesia	22 August 2018

== Results ==
Legend

- DNS — Did not start

=== Qualification ===
Rank	Athlete	Precision			Rapid			Total	Xs	Notes
Rank	Athlete	1	2	3	1	2	3	Total	Xs	Notes
1	Manu Bhaker (IND)	99	97	98	99	99	98	590	28	
2	Feng Sixuan (CHN)	96	98	98	98	99	98	587	17	
3	Liu Rui (CHN)	95	98	98	99	96	100	586	28	
4	Yang Ji-in (KOR)	97	97	95	100	99	98	586	23	
5	Esha Singh (IND)	96	98	98	98	99	97	586	17	
6	Hanieh Rostamian (IRI)	96	97	98	100	95	98	584	27	
7	Rhythm Sangwan (IND)	97	95	98	98	97	98	583	23	
8	Teo Shun Xie (SGP)	96	96	97	96	99	99	583	22	
9	Zhao Nan (CHN)	97	96	98	96	97	99	583	22	
10	Wu Chia-ying (TPE)	96	97	95	97	97	100	582	29	
11	Teh Xiu Hong (SGP)	93	96	98	99	98	97	581	14	
12	Kishmala Talat (PAK)	96	95	98	100	94	96	579	20	
13	Tien Chia-chen (TPE)	95	98	96	97	97	96	579	19	
14	Sim Eun-ji (KOR)	97	93	95	99	98	97	579	14	
15	Chizuru Sasaki (JPN)	95	98	99	96	97	94	579	12	
16	Satoko Yamada (JPN)	97	92	96	97	97	99	578	12	
17	Nguyễn Thùy Trang (VIE)	93	95	96	97	99	97	577	19	
18	Kim Lan-a (KOR)	92	95	98	95	100	97	577	16	
19	Tanyaporn Prucksakorn (THA)	97	96	97	98	94	94	576	23	
20	Alia Sazana Azahari (MAS)	91	95	96	99	97	98	576	18	
21	Tu Yi Yi-tzu (TPE)	97	96	98	93	96	96	576	14	
22	Tömörchödöriin Bayarmaa (MGL)	94	98	91	97	96	98	574	20	
23	Tömörchödöriin Bayartsetseg (MGL)	97	93	96	96	99	92	573	20	
24	Mika Zaitsu (JPN)	96	98	94	99	92	94	573	12	
25	Nguyễn Thị Hương (VIE)	94	94	93	96	98	97	572	14	
26	Teh Xiu Yi (SGP)	96	93	95	96	97	95	572	13	
27	Trịnh Thu Vinh (VIE)	97	99	96	98	87	94	571	16	
28	Natsara Champalat (THA)	93	96	95	97	95	92	568	14	
29	Olga Axenova (KAZ)	95	94	94	96	96	92	567	11	
30	Kanyakorn Hirunphoem (THA)	92	95	95	93	96	95	566	14	
31	Golnoush Sebghatollahi (IRI)	95	99	90	92	96	94	566	11	
32	Franchette Quiroz (PHI)	95	98	94	93	92	91	563	10	
33	Bibiana Ng (MAS)	94	98	94	84	98	93	561	11	
34	Nasra Mohammed (QAT)	88	93	96	96	94	91	558	13	
35	Chao Mei Kam (MAC)	96	94	94	91	95	88	558	10	
36	Saule Alimbek (KAZ)	94	94	94	89	91	95	557	15	
37	Irina Yunusmetova (KAZ)	91	98	96	87	95	88	555	10	
38	Otryadyn Gündegmaa (MGL)	93	90	87	88	98	98	554	20	
39	Zeinab Toumari (IRI)	95	91	96	73	93	95	543	11	
40	Hoi Chi Wai (MAC)	93	93	88	88	88	86	536	7	
41	Amerah Awad (KUW)	91	83	94	89	92	84	533	12	
42	Chao Cho Sin (MAC)	95	89	89	87	81	87	528	5	
43	Elvie Baldivino (PHI)	87	81	93	89	80	81	511	7	
—	Noora Al-Mutawa (QAT)							DNS		

=== Final ===
Rank	Athlete	1st stage			2nd stage – Elimination							S-off	Notes
Rank	Athlete	1	2	3	1	2	3	4	5	6	7	S-off	Notes
1st place, gold medalist(s)	Liu Rui (CHN)	4	8	13	17	22	24	28	31	34	38		GR
2nd place, silver medalist(s)	Esha Singh (IND)	2	5	10	14	15	18	23	27	32	34		
3rd place, bronze medalist(s)	Yang Ji-in (KOR)	4	8	11	15	19	22	23	26	29			
4	Feng Sixuan (CHN)	2	6	10	13	17	20	23	26			SO	
5	Manu Bhaker (IND)	2	6	9	10	15	18	21					
6	Hanieh Rostamian (IRI)	3	7	8	11	12	14						
7	Teo Shun Xie (SGP)	2	4	7	8	11							
8	Wu Chia-ying (TPE)	2	4	6	7								
