= 2024 ISSF World Cup =

Shooting competition

- Sport: Shooting
- Hosts: (Egypt) Cairo (Morocco) Rabat (Spain) Granada (Azerbaijan) Baku (Germany) Munich (Italy) Lonato (India) New Delhi
- Duration: 24 January – 18 October 2024

Seasons
- ← 2023 2025 →

The 2024 ISSF World Cup is the annual edition of the ISSF World Cup in the Olympic shooting events, governed by the International Shooting Sport Federation.

== Calendar ==
The calendar for the 2024 ISSF World Cup

Leg	Dates	Location	Type	Venue
1	24 January – 1 February	(Egypt) Cairo	Rifle/Pistol/Shotgun	Egypt International Olympic City Shooting Range
2	4–13 February	(Morocco) Rabat	Shotgun	Club Les Chênes Shooting Range
3	10–18 February	(Spain) Granada	Rifle/Pistol 10 m	CEAR de Tiro Olimpico Juan Carlos I
4	1–12 May	(Azerbaijan) Baku	Rifle/Pistol/Shotgun	Baku Olympic Shooting Range
5	31 May – 6 June	(Germany) Munich	Rifle/Pistol	Olympic Shooting Range Munich / Hochbrück
6	10–19 June	(Italy) Lonato	Shotgun	Trap Concaverde
7	13–October	(India) New Delhi	(World Cup Final); Rifle/Pistol/Shotgun	Dr Karni Singh Shooting Range

== Rifle events ==
=== Men's individual ===
10m Air Rifle
Stage	Venue	1st place, gold medalist(s)	2nd place, silver medalist(s)	3rd place, bronze medalist(s)
1	(Egypt) Cairo	Divyansh Singh Panwar (IND)	Danilo Sollazzo (ITA)	Lazar Kovačević (SRB)
2	(Spain) Granada	Jiří Přívratský (CZE)	István Péni (HUN)	Edoardo Bonazzi (ITA)
3	(Azerbaijan) Baku	Sheng Lihao (CHN)	Du Linshu (CHN)	Park Ha-jun (KOR)
4	(Germany) Munich	Sheng Lihao (CHN)	Patrik Jany (SVK)	Martin Strempfl (AUT)
Final	(India) New Delhi	Sheng Lihao (CHN)	Istvan Peni (HUN)	Jiri Privratsky (CZE)

50m Rifle 3 Positions
Stage	Venue	1st place, gold medalist(s)	2nd place, silver medalist(s)	3rd place, bronze medalist(s)
1	(Egypt) Cairo	Jiří Přívratský (CZE)	Romain Aufrère (FRA)	Akhil Sheoran (IND)
2	(Azerbaijan) Baku	Liu Yukun (CHN)	Du Linshu (CHN)	Lucas Kryzs (FRA)
3	(Azerbaijan) Baku	Liu Yukun (CHN)	Alexander Schmirl (AUT)	Jiri Privratsky (CZE)
4	(Germany) Munich	Ole Martin Halvorsen (NOR)	Istvan Peni (HUN)	Jon-Hermann Hegg (NOR)
Final	(India) New Delhi	Istvan Peni (HUN)	Jiri Privratsky (CZE)	Akhil Sheoran (IND)

=== Women's individual ===
10m Air Rifle
Stage	Venue	1st place, gold medalist(s)	2nd place, silver medalist(s)	3rd place, bronze medalist(s)
1	(Egypt) Cairo	Anna Janssen (GER)	Sonam Maskar (IND)	Aneta Stankiewicz (POL)
2	(Spain) Granada	Kwon Eun-ji (KOR)	Pernille Nor-Woll (NOR)	Anna Janssen (GER)
3	(Azerbaijan) Baku	Keum Ji-hyeon (KOR)	Wang Zifei (CHN)	Han Jiayu (CHN)
4	(Germany) Munich	Huang Yuting (CHN)	Ban Hyojin (KOR)	Han Jiayu (CHN)
Final	(India) New Delhi	Huang Yuting (CHN)	Sonam Maskar (IND)	Oceanne Muller (FRA)

50m Rifle 3 Positions
Stage	Venue	1st place, gold medalist(s)	2nd place, silver medalist(s)	3rd place, bronze medalist(s)
1	(Egypt) Cairo	Seonaid McIntosh (GBR)	Chiara Leone (SUI)	Emely Jäggi (SUI)
2	(Azerbaijan) Baku	Anna Janssen (GER)	Nina Christen (SUI)	Han Jiayu (CHN)
3	(Azerbaijan) Baku	Seonaid McIntosh (GBR)	Xia Siyu (CHN)	Anna Janssen (GER)
4	(Germany) Munich	Seonaid McIntosh (GBR)	Han Jiayu (CHN)	Sift Kaur Samra (IND)
Final	(India) New Delhi	Rikke Ibsen (DEN)	Jeanette Hegg Duestad (NOR)	Han Jiayu (CHN)

=== Mixed Team ===
10m Air Rifle
Stage	Venue	1st place, gold medalist(s)	2nd place, silver medalist(s)	3rd place, bronze medalist(s)
1	(Egypt) Cairo	Great Britain; Seonaid McIntosh; Dean Bale	India; Sonam Maskar; Arjun Babuta	Germany; Anna Janssen; Maximilian Ulbrich
2	(Spain) Granada	Germany; Anna Janssen; Maximilian Dallinger	Sweden; Isabelle Johansson; Marcus Madsen	Hungary; Eszter Mészáros; István Péni
3	(Azerbaijan) Baku	China; Huang Yuting; Sheng Lihao	China; Han Jiayu; Du Linshu	Italy; Sofia Ceccarello; Danilo Sollazzo
4	(Germany) Munich	China; Huang Yuting; Sheng Lihao	Norway; Jeanette Hegg Duestad; Jon-Hermann Hegg	China; Han Jiayu; Du Linshu

== Pistol events ==
=== Men's individual ===
10m Air Pistol
Stage	Venue	1st place, gold medalist(s)	2nd place, silver medalist(s)	3rd place, bronze medalist(s)
1	(Egypt) Cairo	Lim Ho-jin (KOR)	Samuil Donkov (BUL)	Lauris Strautmanis (LAT)
2	(Spain) Granada	Juraj Tužinský (SVK)	Lauris Strautmanis (LAT)	Buğra Selimzade (TUR)
3	(Azerbaijan) Baku	Xie Yu (CHN)	Robin Walter (GER)	Zhang Bowen (CHN)
4	(Germany) Munich	Sarabjot Singh (IND)	Bu Shuaihang (CHN)	Robin Walter (GER)
Final	(India) New Delhi	Xie Yu (CHN)	Robin Walter (GER)	Federico Nilo Maldini (ITA)

25m Rapid Fire Pistol
Stage	Venue	1st place, gold medalist(s)	2nd place, silver medalist(s)	3rd place, bronze medalist(s)
1	(Egypt) Cairo	Song Jong-ho (KOR)	Nikita Chiryukin (KAZ)	Florian Peter (GER)
2	(Azerbaijan) Baku	Martin Podhráský (CZE)	Wang Xinjie (CHN)	Clément Bessaguet (FRA)
3	(Azerbaijan) Baku	Li Yuehong (CHN)	Clément Bessaguet (FRA)	Song Jong-ho (KOR)
4	(Germany) Munich	Li Yuehong (CHN)	Christian Reitz (GER)	Clément Bessaguet (FRA)
Final	(India) New Delhi	Li Yuehong (CHN)	Florian Peter (GER)	Wang Xinjie (CHN)

=== Women's individual ===
10m Air Pistol
Stage	Venue	1st place, gold medalist(s)	2nd place, silver medalist(s)	3rd place, bronze medalist(s)
1	(Egypt) Cairo	Anna Korakaki (GRE)	Anuradha Devi (IND)	Irina Yunusmetova (KAZ)
2	(Spain) Granada	Klaudia Breś (POL)	Andrea Ibarra (MEX)	Manu Bhaker (IND)
3	(Azerbaijan) Baku	Camille Jedrzejewski (FRA)	Kim Ye-ji (KOR)	Jiang Ranxin (CHN)
4	(Germany) Munich	Zorana Arunovic (SRB)	Jiang Ranxin (CHN)	Li Xue (CHN)
Final	(India) New Delhi	Camille Jedrzejewski (FRA)	Liu Heng Yu (TPE)	Hala Elgohari (EGY)

25m Pistol
Stage	Venue	1st place, gold medalist(s)	2nd place, silver medalist(s)	3rd place, bronze medalist(s)
1	(Egypt) Cairo	Doreen Vennekamp (GER)	Anna Korakaki (GRE)	Veronika Major (HUN)
2	(Azerbaijan) Baku	Yang Ji-in (KOR)	Zhao Nan (CHN)	Josefin Eder (GER)
3	(Azerbaijan) Baku	Kim Ye-ji (KOR)	Yang Ji-in (KOR)	Josefin Eder (GER)
4	(Germany) Munich	Camille Jedrzejewski (FRA)	Doreen Vennekamp (GER)	Kim Ye-ji (KOR)
Final	(India) New Delhi	Josefin Eder (GER)	Camille Jedrzejewski (FRA)	Sixuan Feng (CHN)

=== Mixed Team ===
10m Air Pistol
Stage	Venue	1st place, gold medalist(s)	2nd place, silver medalist(s)	3rd place, bronze medalist(s)
1	(Egypt) Cairo	India; Rhythm Sangwan; Ujjawal Malik	Armenia; Elmira Karapetyan; Benik Khlghatyan	Kazakhstan; Irina Yunusmetova; Valeriy Rakhimzhan
2	(Spain) Granada	Germany; Sandra Reitz; Michael Schwald	Bulgaria; Miroslava Mincheva; Samuil Donkov	Poland; Klaudia Breś; Grzegorz Długosz
3	(Azerbaijan) Baku	Turkey; İsmail Keleş; Şimal Yılmaz	Kazakhstan; Valeriya Popelova; Eldar Imankulov	China; Li Xue; Xie Yu
4	(Germany) Munich	Turkey; Sevval Ilayda Tarhan; Yusuf Dikec	China; Jiang Ranxin; Xie Yu	South Korea; Oh Ye-jin; Lee Won-ho

== Shotgun events ==
=== Men's individual ===
Trap
Stage	Venue	1st place, gold medalist(s)	2nd place, silver medalist(s)	3rd place, bronze medalist(s)
1	(Egypt) Cairo	Alberto Fernandez (ESP)	Diego Valeri (ITA)	Oguzhan Tuzun (TUR)
2	(Morocco) Rabat	Mauro De Filippis (ITA)	David Kostelecký (CZE)	James Willett (AUS)
3	(Azerbaijan) Baku	James Willett (AUS)	Filip Marinov (SVK)	Jean Pierre Brol (GUA)
4	(Italy) Lonato	Matthew Coward-Holley (GBR)	Daniele Resca (ITA)	Yu Haicheng (CHN)
Final	(India) New Delhi	Ying Qi (CHN)	Vivaan Kapoor (IND)	Tolga Tuncer (TUR)

Skeet
Stage	Venue	1st place, gold medalist(s)	2nd place, silver medalist(s)	3rd place, bronze medalist(s)
1	(Egypt) Cairo	Azmy Mehelba (EGY)	Ben Llewellin (GBR)	Sven Korte (GER)
2	(Morocco) Rabat	Tammaro Cassandro (ITA)	Vincent Hancock (USA)	Daniel Korčák (CZE)
3	(Azerbaijan) Baku	Lyu Jianlin (CHN)	Federico Gil (ARG)	Ben Llewellin (GBR)
4	(Italy) Lonato	Jesper Hansen (DEN)	Conner Lynn Prince (USA)	Rashid Saleh Al-Athba (QAT)
Final	(India) New Delhi	Tammaro Cassandro (ITA)	Gabriele Rossetti (ITA)	Anantjeet Singh Naruka (IND)

=== Women's individual ===
Trap
Stage	Venue	1st place, gold medalist(s)	2nd place, silver medalist(s)	3rd place, bronze medalist(s)
1	(Egypt) Cairo	Mariya Dmitriyenko (KAZ)	Fátima Gálvez (SPA)	Alessandra Perilli (SMR)
2	(Morocco) Rabat	Jessica Rossi (ITA)	Alessandra Perilli (SMR)	Ryann Paige Phillips (USA)
3	(Azerbaijan) Baku	Ray Bassil (LBN)	Penny Smith (AUS)	Erica Sessa (ITA)
4	(Italy) Lonato	Zuzana Rehák-Štefečeková (SVK)	Fátima Gálvez (SPA)	Catherine Skinner (AUS)
Final	(India) New Delhi	Alessandra Perilli (SMR)	Erica Sessa (ITA)	Safiye Temizdemir (TUR)

Skeet
Stage	Venue	1st place, gold medalist(s)	2nd place, silver medalist(s)	3rd place, bronze medalist(s)
1	(Egypt) Cairo	Samantha Simonton (USA)	Martina Maruzzo (ITA)	Reem Al-Sharshani (QAT)
2	(Morocco) Rabat	Simona Scocchetti (ITA)	Martina Maruzzo (ITA)	Lucie Anastassiou (FRA)
3	(Azerbaijan) Baku	Austen Smith (USA)	Martina Maruzzo (ITA)	Danka Barteková (SVK)
4	(Italy) Lonato	Diana Bacosi (ITA)	Dania Jo Vizzi (USA)	Austen Jewel Smith (USA)
Final	(India) New Delhi	Samantha Simonton (USA)	Diana Bacosi (ITA)	Lucie Anastassiou (FRA)

=== Mixed Team ===
Skeet
Stage	Venue	1st place, gold medalist(s)	2nd place, silver medalist(s)	3rd place, bronze medalist(s)
1	(Egypt) Cairo	Qatar; Rashid Saleh Al-Athba; Reem Al-Sharshani	France; Éric Delaunay; Lucie Anastassiou	Mexico; Luis Raúl Gallardo; Gabriela Rodríguez
2	(Morocco) Rabat	United States; Vincent Hancock; Kimberly Rhode	Georgia; Yaroslav Startsev; Elizaveta Boiarshinova	Czech Republic; Tomáš Nýdrle; Martina Kučerová
3	(Azerbaijan) Baku	Chile; Hector Flores; Francisca Crovetto	United States; Dustan Taylor; Dania Jo Vizzi	Australia; Joshua Bell; Aislin Jones
4	(Italy) Lonato	United States; Vincent Hancock; Austen Smith	Kuwait; Abdullah Al-Rashidi; Eman Al-Shamaa	Sweden; Marcus Svensson; Victoria Larsson

== Medal table ==
Rank	Nation	Gold	Silver	Bronze	Total
1	China (CHN)	16	11	12	39
2	Italy (ITA)	6	9	4	19
3	Germany (GER)	6	5	8	19
4	South Korea (KOR)	6	3	4	13
5	United States (USA)	5	4	2	11
6	Great Britain (GBR)	5	1	1	7
7	India (IND)	3	5	5	13
8	France (FRA)	3	4	6	13
9	Czech Republic (CZE)	3	2	4	9
10	Slovakia (SVK)	2	2	1	5
11	Turkey (TUR)	2	0	4	6
12	Denmark (DEN)	2	0	0	2
13	Hungary (HUN)	1	3	2	6
14	Norway (NOR)	1	3	1	5
15	Kazakhstan (KAZ)	1	2	2	5
16	Spain (ESP)	1	2	0	3
17	Australia (AUS)	1	1	3	5
18	San Marino (SMR)	1	1	1	3
19	Greece (GRE)	1	1	0	2
20	Poland (POL)	1	0	2	3
20	Qatar (QAT)	1	0	2	3
22	Egypt (EGY)	1	0	1	2
22	Serbia (SRB)	1	0	1	2
24	Chile (CHI)	1	0	0	1
24	Lebanon (LBN)	1	0	0	1
26	Switzerland (SUI)	0	2	1	3
27	Bulgaria (BUL)	0	2	0	2
28	Austria (AUT)	0	1	1	2
28	Latvia (LAT)	0	1	1	2
28	Mexico (MEX)	0	1	1	2
28	Sweden (SWE)	0	1	1	2
32	Argentina (ARG)	0	1	0	1
32	Armenia (ARM)	0	1	0	1
32	Chinese Taipei (TPE)	0	1	0	1
32	Georgia (GEO)	0	1	0	1
32	Kuwait (KUW)	0	1	0	1
37	Guatemala (GUA)	0	0	1	1
Totals (37 entries)		72	72	72	216
