= Shooting at the 2022 Asian Games – Women's 25 metre pistol team =

Women's 25 metre pistol team at the 2022 Asian Games
- Venue: Fuyang Yinhu Sports Centre
- Dates: 26–27 September 2023
- Competitors: 36 from 12 nations

Medalists
gold medal	India; Manu Bhaker, Rhythm Sangwan, Esha Singh
silver medal	China; Feng Sixuan, Liu Rui, Zhao Nan
bronze medal	South Korea; Kim Lan-a, Sim Eun-ji, Yang Ji-in

The women's 25 metre pistol team competition at the 2022 Asian Games in Hangzhou, China was held on 26 and 27 September 2023 at Fuyang Yinhu Sports Centre.

== Schedule ==
All times are China Standard Time (UTC+08:00)

Date	Time	Event
Tuesday, 26 September 2023	09:00	Precision
Wednesday, 27 September 2023	09:00	Rapid

== Records ==
Prior to this competition, the existing world, Asian and Games records were as follows.

World Record	China	1768	Busan, South Korea	4 October 2002
Asian Record	China	1768	Busan, South Korea	4 October 2002
Games Record	China	1768	Busan, South Korea	4 October 2002

== Results ==
Rank	Team	Precision			Rapid			Total	Xs	Notes
Rank	Team	1	2	3	1	2	3	Total	Xs	Notes
1st place, gold medalist(s)	India (IND)	292	290	294	295	295	293	1759	68	
	Manu Bhaker	99	97	98	99	99	98	590	28	
	Rhythm Sangwan	97	95	98	98	97	98	583	23	
	Esha Singh	96	98	98	98	99	97	586	17	
2nd place, silver medalist(s)	China (CHN)	288	292	294	293	292	297	1756	67	
	Feng Sixuan	96	98	98	98	99	98	587	17	
	Liu Rui	95	98	98	99	96	100	586	28	
	Zhao Nan	97	96	98	96	97	99	583	22	
3rd place, bronze medalist(s)	South Korea (KOR)	286	285	288	294	297	292	1742	53	
	Kim Lan-a	92	95	98	95	100	97	577	16	
	Sim Eun-ji	97	93	95	99	98	97	579	14	
	Yang Ji-in	97	97	95	100	99	98	586	23	
4	Chinese Taipei (TPE)	288	291	289	287	290	292	1737	62	
	Tien Chia-chen	95	98	96	97	97	96	579	19	
	Tu Yi Yi-tzu	97	96	98	93	96	96	576	14	
	Wu Chia-ying	96	97	95	97	97	100	582	29	
5	Singapore (SGP)	285	285	290	291	294	291	1736	49	
	Teh Xiu Hong	93	96	98	99	98	97	581	14	
	Teh Xiu Yi	96	93	95	96	97	95	572	13	
	Teo Shun Xie	96	96	97	96	99	99	583	22	
6	Japan (JPN)	288	288	289	292	286	287	1730	36	
	Chizuru Sasaki	95	98	99	96	97	94	579	12	
	Satoko Yamada	97	92	96	97	97	99	578	12	
	Mika Zaitsu	96	98	94	99	92	94	573	12	
7	Vietnam (VIE)	284	288	285	291	284	288	1720	49	
	Nguyễn Thị Hương	94	94	93	96	98	97	572	14	
	Nguyễn Thùy Trang	93	95	96	97	99	97	577	19	
	Trịnh Thu Vinh	97	99	96	98	87	94	571	16	
8	Thailand (THA)	282	287	287	288	285	281	1710	51	
	Natsara Champalat	93	96	95	97	95	92	568	14	
	Kanyakorn Hirunphoem	92	95	95	93	96	95	566	14	
	Tanyaporn Prucksakorn	97	96	97	98	94	94	576	23	
9	Mongolia (MGL)	284	281	274	281	293	288	1701	60	
	Tömörchödöriin Bayarmaa	94	98	91	97	96	98	574	20	
	Tömörchödöriin Bayartsetseg	97	93	96	96	99	92	573	20	
	Otryadyn Gündegmaa	93	90	87	88	98	98	554	20	
10	Iran (IRI)	286	287	284	265	284	287	1693	49	
	Hanieh Rostamian	96	97	98	100	95	98	584	27	
	Golnoush Sebghatollahi	95	99	90	92	96	94	566	11	
	Zeinab Toumari	95	91	96	73	93	95	543	11	
11	Kazakhstan (KAZ)	280	286	284	272	282	275	1679	36	
	Saule Alimbek	94	94	94	89	91	95	557	15	
	Olga Axenova	95	94	94	96	96	92	567	11	
	Irina Yunusmetova	91	98	96	87	95	88	555	10	
12	Macau (MAC)	284	276	271	266	264	261	1622	22	
	Chao Cho Sin	95	89	89	87	81	87	528	5	
	Chao Mei Kam	96	94	94	91	95	88	558	10	
	Hoi Chi Wai	93	93	88	88	88	86	536	7	
