= 2021 ISSF Junior World Championships =

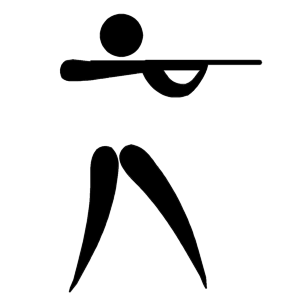
- Location: Lima, Peru
- Dates: 27 September – 10 October 2021

The 2021 ISSF Junior World Championships was held in Lima, Peru for Rifle, Pistol, and Shotgun from 27 September to 10 October 2021.

== Results ==
=== Men ===
Event	Gold		Silver		Bronze	
10m Air Rifle	William Shaner; United States	250.7	Rudrankksh Balasaheb Patil; India	250.0	Rylan William Kissell; United States	228.2
10m Air Rifle Team	India; Dhanush Srikanth; Rajpreet Singh; Paarth Makhija		United States; William Shaner; Rylan William Kissel; John Blanton III		Spain; Jesus Oviedo; Juan Cecilia; Jorge Estevez Solorzano	
50m Rifle Prone	Soma Richard Hammerl; Hungary	623.4	Jiří Přívratský; Czech Republic	622.9	Max Braun; Germany	621.5
50m Rifle 3 Position	Aishwarya Pratap Singh Tomar; India	463.4 WJR	Lucas Bernard Denis Kryzs; France	456.5	Gavin Raymond Leigh Barnick; United States	446.6
50m Rifle 3 Position Team	Hungary; Viktor Kiss; Ferenc Toeroek; Soma Richard Hammerl		France; Nathan Bailly; Lucas Bernard Denis Kryzz; Bastien Louis Noel Destefanis		United States; Rylan William Kissell; Braden Wayne Peiser; Gavin Raymond Leigh Barnick	
10m Air Pistol	Abdul-Aziz Kurdzi; Belarus	236.8	Martin Freije Torneiro; Spain	235.5	Eduard Baumeister; Germany	215.4
10m Air Pistol Team	India; Sarabjot Singh; Naveen Naveen; Shiva Narwal		Belarus; Abdul Aziz Kurdzi; Ivan Kazak; Uladzislau Dzemesh		United States; Remington Smith; Hunter Alan Battig; Wesley Travis Anderson	
25m Rapid Fire Pistol	Henry Turner Leverett; United States	32	Adarsh Singh; India	28	Laurent Pierre Andre Cussigh; France	24
25m Rapid Fire Pistol Team	India; Adarsh Singh; Vijayveer Sidhu; Anish Anish		Germany; Fabian Otto; Felix Luca Hollfoth; Tobias Gsoell		Thailand; Schwakon Triniphakorn; Wachiravit Phuangthong; Ram Khamhaeng	
Trap	Andres Garcia; Spain	41	Erdogan Akkaya; Turkey	38	Juan Antonio Garcia; Spain	30
Trap Team	Italy; Samuele Faustinelli; Lorenzo Franquillo; Fabio Fiandri		India; Bakhtyaruddin Mohamadmuzahid Malek; Shardul Vihan; Vivaan Kapoor		Slovakia; Daniel Hruska; Filip Benkovsky; Timotej Toth	
Skeet	Elijah Keith Ellis; United States	53	Jordan Douglas Sapp; United States	52	Cristian Ghilli; Italy	42
Skeet Team	Italy; Cristian Ghilli; Francesco Bernardini; Giammarco Tuzi		United States; Jordan Douglas Sapp; Benjamin Joseph Keller; Elijah Keith Ellis		India; Rajveer Gill; Ayush Rudraraju; Abhay Singh Sekhon	

Individual Competition

Event	Gold		Silver		Bronze	
Doluble Trap Grand Prix	Vinay Pratap Singh Chandrawat; India	120	Sehajpreet Singh; India	114	Mayank Shokeen; India	111
25m Standard Pistol	Vijayveer Sidhu; India	570-17x	Udhayveer Sidhu; India	570-14x	Harsh Gupta; India	566-10x
50m Pistol	Arjun Singh Cheema; India	549-11x	Shaurya Sarin; India	549-05x	Ajinkya Chavan; India	549-05x

=== Women ===
Event	Gold		Silver		Bronze	
10m Air Rifle	Océanne Muller; France	250.6; Shoot-off: 10.4	Mary Tucker; United States	250.6; Shoot-off: 10.0	Ramita; India	229.1
10m Air Rifle Team	Hungary; Eszter Meszaros; Eszter Denes; Lea Horvath		India; Nisha Kanwar; Zeena Khitta; Atmika Gupta		France; Océanne Muller; Julia Canestrelli; Agathe Cecile Camille Girard	
50m Rifle Prone	Anna Janssen; Germany	623.3	Mary Tucker; United States	622.3	Sheileen Waibel; Austria	620.0
50m Rifle 3 Position	Julia Canestrelli; France	455.7	Eszter Meszaros; Hungary	454.3	Mary Tucker; United States	443.8
50m Rifle 3 Position Team	United States; Molly Elizabeth McGhin; Katie Lorraine Zaun; Mary Tucker	47	India; Nischal; Prasiddhi Mahant; Ayushi Podder	43	Germany; Nele Stark; Larissa Weindorf; Anna Janssen	46
10m Air Pistol	Manu Bhaker; India	241.3	Esha Singh; India	240.0	Yasemin Beyza Yılmaz; Turkey	217.9
10m Air Pistol Team	India; Rhythm Sangwan; Manu Bhaker; Shikha Narwal		Belarus; Aliaksandra Piatrova; Zoya Dasko; Alina Nestsiarovich		Ukraine; Viliena Bevz; Yana Chuchmarova; Nadiia Shamanova	
25m Pistol	Naamya Kapoor; India	36	Camille Jedrzejewski; France	33	Manu Bhaker; India	31
25m Pistol Team	India; Rhythm Sangwan; Manu Bhaker; Naamya Kapoor		United States; Abbie Russell leverett Katelyn Morgan Abelin; Ada Claudia Korkhin		France; Camille Jedrzejewski; Heloise Fourre; Elisa Candel	
Trap	Oriane Monique Froment; France	41	Ryann Paige Phillips; United States	40	Giorgia Lenticchia; Italy	30
Trap Team	United States; Faith Alexa Pendergrass; Sydney Marie Krieger; Bethany High		Italy; Gaia Regazzini; Sofia Littame; Giorgia Lenticchia		Germany; Nadine Halwax; Patricia Dannler; Lena Hubbermann	
Skeet	Alishia Fayth Layne; United States	46; Shoot-off: 2	Ganemat Sekhon; India	46; Shoot-off: 0	Sara Bongini; Italy	35
Skeet Team	India; Areeba Khan; Raiza Dhillon; Ganemat Sekhon		Italy; Damiana Paolacci; Sara Bongini; Giada Longhi		Germany; Isabel Wassing; Annabella Hettmer; Emilie Bundan	

Individual Competition

Event	Gold		Silver		Bronze	
Double Trap Grand Prix	Manvi Soni; India	105	Yeshaya Hafiz Contractor; India	90	Hitasha; India	76
25m Standard Pistol	Rhythm Sangwan; India	573-21x	Niveditha Veloor Nair; India	565-13x	Naamya Kapoor; India	563-16x
50m Pistol	Shikha NARWAL; India	530-05x	Esha Singh; India	529-05x	Navdeep Kaur; India	526-06x

=== Mixed ===
Event	Gold	Silver	Bronze
10m Air Rifle Team	United States; Mary Tucker; William Shaner	India; Atmika Gupta; Rajpreet Singh	Italy; Sofia Ceccarello; Danilo Sollazzo
50m Rifle Prone Team	Germany; Larissa Weindorf; Max Braun	United States; Molly Elizabeth McGhin; Braden Wayne Peiser	United States; Mary Tucker; Gavin Barnick
50m Rifle 3 Position Team	Germany; Anna Janssen; Max Braun	India; Ayushi Podder; Aishwary Pratap Singh Tomar	Czech Republic; Veronika Blažíčková; Jiří Přívratský
10m Air Pistol Team	India; Manu Bhaker; Sarabjot Singh	India; Shikha Narwal; Naveen	Romania; Daria-Olimpia Haristiade; Luca Joldea
25m Pistol Team	India; Vijayveer Sidhu; Rhythm sangwan	Thailand; Kanyakorm Hirunphoem; Schwakon Triniphakorn	India; Anish; Tejaswini
Trap Team	Spain; Juan Antonio Garcia; Mar Molne Magrina	Italy; Sofia Littame; Samuele Faustinelli	Germany; Marius Josef Erik John; Nadine Halwax
Skeet Team	Italy; Sara Bongini; Cristian Ghilli	Romania; Etienne-Cristian Islai; Raveca-Maria Islai	Greece; Nikolaos Frantzeskakis; Emmanouela Katzouraki

== Medal table ==
* Host nation (Peru)

Rank	Nation	Gold	Silver	Bronze	Total
1	India (IND)	17	16	10	43
2	United States (USA)	7	8	6	21
3	Italy (ITA)	3	3	4	10
4	France (FRA)	3	3	3	9
5	Germany (GER)	3	1	6	10
6	Hungary (HUN)	3	1	0	4
7	Spain (ESP)	2	1	2	5
8	Belarus (BLR)	1	2	0	3
9	Czech Republic (CZE)	0	1	1	2
9	Romania (ROU)	0	1	1	2
9	Thailand (THA)	0	1	1	2
9	Turkey (TUR)	0	1	1	2
13	Austria (AUT)	0	0	1	1
13	Greece (GRE)	0	0	1	1
13	Slovakia (SVK)	0	0	1	1
13	Ukraine (UKR)	0	0	1	1
Totals (16 entries)		39	39	39	117
