= Shooting at the 2023 European Games – Women's 10 metre air pistol =

Women's 10 metre air pistol at the 2023 European Games
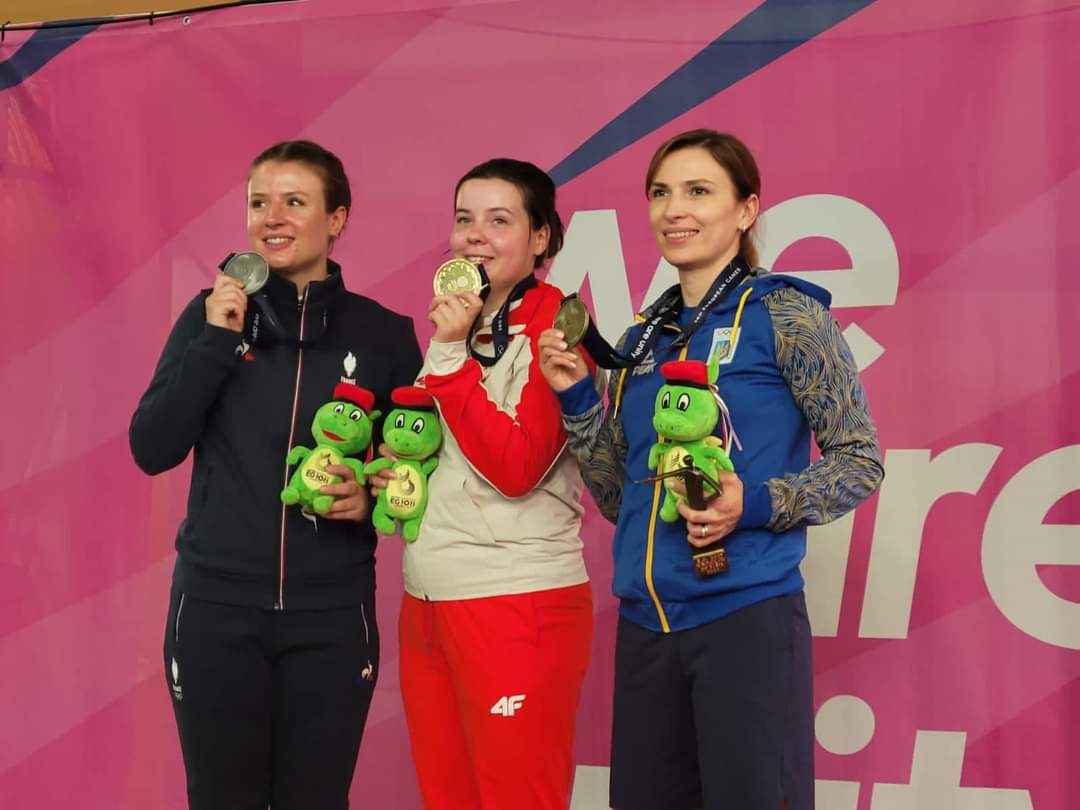
- Venue: Wrocław Shooting Centre
- Dates: 22 June
- Competitors: 38 from 25 nations

Medalists
| gold medal | Klaudia Breś | Poland |
| silver medal | Camille Jedrzejewski | France |
| bronze medal | Olena Kostevych | Ukraine |

The women's 10 metre air pistol event at the 2023 European Games took place on 22 June at the Wrocław Shooting Centre.

== Records ==
Prior to this competition, the existing world, European and Games records were as follows.

Qualification
| World Record | Jiang Ranxin (CHN) | 591 | Cairo, Egypt | 15 October 2022 |
| European Record | Zorana Arunović (SRB) | 590 | Cairo, Egypt | 15 October 2022 |
| Games Record | Klaudia Breś (POL); Zorana Arunović (SRB); Sylvia Steiner (AUT) | 578 | Minsk, Belarus | 23 June 2019 |

== Results ==
=== Qualification ===
| Rank | Athlete | Country | 1 | 2 | 3 | 4 | 5 | 6 | Total | Notes |
|---|---|---|---|---|---|---|---|---|---|---|
| 1 | Anna Korakaki | Greece | 99 | 98 | 98 | 91 | 97 | 97 | 580-20x | Q, GR |
| 2 | Klaudia Breś | Poland | 97 | 99 | 96 | 94 | 96 | 97 | 579-22x | Q |
| 3 | Şevval İlayda Tarhan | Turkey | 94 | 96 | 98 | 97 | 97 | 96 | 578-14x | Q |
| 4 | Olena Kostevych | Ukraine | 95 | 95 | 98 | 97 | 95 | 97 | 577-22x | Q |
| 5 | Camille Jedrzejewski | France | 94 | 97 | 97 | 96 | 96 | 96 | 576-17x | Q |
| 6 | Antoaneta Kostadinova | Bulgaria | 97 | 94 | 98 | 98 | 95 | 94 | 576-16x | Q |
| 7 | Zorana Arunović | Serbia | 98 | 97 | 96 | 96 | 94 | 94 | 575-18x | Q |
| 8 | Julita Borek | Poland | 96 | 97 | 96 | 99 | 94 | 93 | 575-17x | Q |
| 9 | Sandra Reitz | Germany | 93 | 96 | 96 | 97 | 98 | 94 | 574-19x | |
| 10 | Anna Miřejovská | Czech Republic | 96 | 97 | 97 | 96 | 97 | 91 | 574-15x | |
| 11 | Maria Varricchio | Italy | 98 | 95 | 95 | 96 | 96 | 93 | 573-19x | |
| 12 | Elmira Karapetyan | Armenia | 93 | 95 | 95 | 95 | 95 | 99 | 572-16x | |
| 13 | Veronika Schejbalová | Czech Republic | 96 | 95 | 93 | 93 | 99 | 96 | 572-16x | |
| 14 | Polina Kolesnikova | Ukraine | 93 | 96 | 98 | 95 | 98 | 92 | 572-10x | |
| 15 | Irlanda Mira-Perceval | Spain | 97 | 93 | 96 | 96 | 96 | 91 | 569-18x | |
| 16 | Anna Dulce | Moldova | 97 | 93 | 96 | 94 | 95 | 94 | 569-15x | |
| 17 | Sylvia Steiner | Austria | 93 | 95 | 95 | 97 | 96 | 93 | 569-13x | |
| 18 | Agate Rašmane | Latvia | 97 | 95 | 93 | 96 | 92 | 95 | 568-15x | |
| 19 | Sara Costantino | Italy | 94 | 92 | 95 | 94 | 98 | 94 | 567-16x | |
| 20 | Lizi Kiladze | Georgia | 92 | 94 | 97 | 98 | 90 | 96 | 567-14x | |
| 21 | Miroslava Mincheva | Bulgaria | 96 | 94 | 96 | 94 | 93 | 93 | 566-17x | |
| 22 | Veronika Major | Hungary | 91 | 95 | 96 | 97 | 94 | 93 | 566-13x | |
| 23 | Mariami Prodiashvili | Georgia | 94 | 93 | 94 | 94 | 98 | 93 | 566-11x | |
| 24 | Josefin Eder | Germany | 93 | 97 | 91 | 95 | 96 | 93 | 565-18x | |
| 25 | Nigar Nasirova | Azerbaijan | 90 | 97 | 92 | 96 | 93 | 97 | 565-8x | |
| 26 | Lana Skeledžija | Croatia | 93 | 94 | 93 | 94 | 94 | 96 | 564-17x | |
| 27 | Jessica Liddon | Great Britain | 93 | 94 | 92 | 96 | 97 | 91 | 563-11x | |
| 28 | Stina Lawner | Sweden | 95 | 94 | 92 | 93 | 99 | 90 | 563-10x | |
| 29 | Christina Moschi | Greece | 95 | 91 | 93 | 95 | 96 | 92 | 562-14x | |
| 30 | Joana Castelão | Portugal | 89 | 91 | 97 | 92 | 97 | 96 | 562-12x | |
| 31 | Céline Goberville | France | 97 | 93 | 91 | 91 | 94 | 95 | 561-4x | |
| 32 | Vendela Sörensson | Sweden | 92 | 92 | 95 | 94 | 92 | 94 | 559-14x | |
| 33 | Nevena Šaranović | Montenegro | 95 | 88 | 93 | 95 | 96 | 90 | 557-16x | |
| 34 | Eleanor Bezzina | Malta | 93 | 95 | 90 | 94 | 91 | 94 | 557-15x | |
| 35 | Nazrin Abbasli | Azerbaijan | 91 | 92 | 97 | 90 | 94 | 93 | 557-12x | |
| 36 | Sonia Franquet | Spain | 91 | 96 | 92 | 91 | 94 | 92 | 556-7x | |
| 37 | Daria Haristiade | Romania | 92 | 97 | 94 | 89 | 92 | 91 | 555-12x | |
| 38 | Anđela Miličković | Montenegro | 92 | 93 | 87 | 93 | 92 | 91 | 548-9x | |

=== Ranking match ===
| Rank | Athlete | Series | | | | | Total | Notes |
| Rank | Athlete | 1 | 2 | 3 | 4 | 5 | Total | Notes |
|---|---|---|---|---|---|---|---|---|
| 1 | Camille Jedrzejewski (FRA) | 51.2 | 50.2 | 49.8 | 50.4 | 51.7 | 253.3 | QG |
| 1 | Camille Jedrzejewski (FRA) | 51.2 | 101.4 | 151.2 | 201.6 | 253.3 | 253.3 | QG |
| 2 | Klaudia Breś (POL) | 50.1 | 52.4 | 53.2 | 49.4 | 47.7 | 252.8 | QG |
| 2 | Klaudia Breś (POL) | 50.1 | 102.5 | 155.7 | 205.1 | 252.8 | 252.8 | QG |
| 3rd place, bronze medalist(s) | Olena Kostevych (UKR) | 50.7 | 52.0 | 49.8 | 51.8 | 47.7 | 252.0 | |
| 3rd place, bronze medalist(s) | Olena Kostevych (UKR) | 50.7 | 102.7 | 152.5 | 204.3 | 252.0 | 252.0 | |
| 4 | Anna Korakaki (GRE) | 48.8 | 49.1 | 52.3 | 50.3 | 51.4 | 251.9 | |
| 4 | Anna Korakaki (GRE) | 48.8 | 97.9 | 150.2 | 200.5 | 251.9 | 251.9 | |
| 5 | Şevval İlayda Tarhan (TUR) | 47.4 | 49.0 | 51.1 | 50.3 | | 197.8 | |
| 5 | Şevval İlayda Tarhan (TUR) | 47.4 | 96.4 | 147.5 | 197.8 | | 197.8 | |
| 6 | Antoaneta Kostadinova (BUL) | 49.1 | 50.8 | 48.1 | 48.2 | | 196.2 | |
| 6 | Antoaneta Kostadinova (BUL) | 49.1 | 99.9 | 148 | 196.2 | | 196.2 | |
| 7 | Zorana Arunović (SRB) | 47.7 | 50.3 | 48.8 | | | 146.8 | |
| 7 | Zorana Arunović (SRB) | 47.7 | 98 | 146.8 | | | 146.8 | |
| 8 | Julita Borek (POL) | 45.6 | 47.1 | 47.9 | | | 140.6 | |
| 8 | Julita Borek (POL) | 45.6 | 92.7 | 140.6 | | | 140.6 | |

=== Gold medal match ===
| Rank | Athlete | Shot | | | | | | | | | | | | | | | Total |
| Rank | Athlete | 1 | 2 | 3 | 4 | 5 | 6 | 7 | 8 | 9 | 10 | 11 | 12 | 13 | 14 | 15 | Total |
|---|---|---|---|---|---|---|---|---|---|---|---|---|---|---|---|---|---|
| 1st place, gold medalist(s) | Klaudia Breś (POL) | 9.5 | 10.2 | 10.2 | 9.7 | 10.6 | 10.0 | 9.9 | 10.7 | 10.6 | 10.5 | 10.6 | 10.4 | 9.9 | 9.5 | 9.9 | 17 |
| 2nd place, silver medalist(s) | Camille Jedrzejewski (FRA) | 9.1 | 10.6 | 9.4 | 9.7 | 9.4 | 10.5 | 10.2 | 10.2 | 9.9 | 10.7 | 9.5 | 9.9 | 10.3 | 10.3 | 9.5 | 13 |
