= Shooting at the 2025 SEA Games =

- Venue: Shooting Range, Huamark Sports Complex, Bang Kapi and Photharam Shooting Range Photharam
- Location: Bang Kapi, Bangkok and Photharam, Ratchaburi, Thailand
- Dates: 10–19 December 2025

Shooting competitions at the 2025 SEA Games took place at Shooting Range, Huamark Sports Complex in Khlong Luang, Bangkok, and Photharam Shooting Range, Photharam, Ratchaburi for shooting (skeet) from 10 to 19 December 2025.

== Medal table ==
* Host nation (Thailand)

Rank	Nation	Gold	Silver	Bronze	Total
1	Vietnam	8	5	1	14
2	Indonesia	6	9	8	23
3	Thailand*	6	8	6	20
4	Philippines	4	5	5	14
5	Malaysia	4	1	8	13
6	Singapore	2	2	4	8
Totals (6 entries)		30	30	32	92

== Medalists ==
=== Pistol & rifle ===
Men

Event	Gold	Silver	Bronze
10 m air pistol	Johnathan Wong; Malaysia	Michael Angelo Fernandez; Philippines	Sulthanul Aulia Ma'ruf; Indonesia
10 m air pistol team	Indonesia; Muhamad Iqbal Raia Prabowo; Sulthanul Aulia Ma'ruf; Wira Sukmana	Vietnam; Phạm Quang Huy; Nguyễn Đình Thành; Lại Công Minh	Philippines; Carlo Deniel Valdez; Michael Angelo Fernandez; Timothy John Poblete
25 m rapid fire pistol	Hà Minh Thành; Vietnam	Dewa Putu Yadi Suteja; Indonesia	Muhammad Fawwaz Aditia Farrel; Indonesia
25 m rapid fire pistol team	Vietnam; Hà Minh Thành; Trần Công Hiếu; Phạm Quang Huy	Indonesia; Muhammad Fawwaz Aditia Farrel; Dewa Putu Yadi Suteja; Anang Yulianto	Thailand; Sriyanon Karndee; Schwakon Triniphakorn; Theethat Praditsudswat
50 m rifle three positions	Haritz Iklil Hessly Hafiz; Malaysia	Marat Lleyton Veloso; Singapore	Fathur Gustafian; Indonesia
50 m rifle three positions team	Vietnam; Nguyễn Văn Quân; Phùng Việt Dũng; Nguyễn Thành Nam	Thailand; Thongphaphum Vongsukdee; Patsugree Sriwichai; Napis Tortungpanich	Indonesia; Izzuddin Afif; Trisnarmanto; Fathur Gustafian

Women

Event	Gold	Silver	Bronze
10 m air pistol	Trịnh Thu Vinh; Vietnam	Nguyễn Thuỳ Trang; Vietnam	Nurul Syasya Nadiah Mohd Arifin; Malaysia
10 m air pistol team	Vietnam; Trịnh Thu Vinh; Nguyễn Thuỳ Trang; Triệu Thị Hoa Hồng	Thailand; Natsara Champalat; Tanyaporn Prucksakorn; Kamonlak Saencha	Malaysia; Joseline Lee Yean Cheah; Dina Batrisyia Adi Azhar; Nurul Syasya Nadiah Mohd Arifin
25 m pistol	Trịnh Thu Vinh; Vietnam	Nguyễn Thùy Trang; Vietnam	Alia Sazana Azahari; Malaysia
25 m pistol team	Vietnam; Trịnh Thu Vinh; Nguyễn Thùy Dung; Nguyễn Thùy Trang	Indonesia; Rihadatul Asyifa; Shiva Awallu Nissa; Juliani Wenas	Thailand; Natsara Champalat; Tanyaporn Prucksakorn; Nechaya Klaisuban
10 m air rifle	Dewi Laila Mubarokah; Indonesia	Dominique Rachmawati Karini; Indonesia	Lê Thị Mộng Tuyền; Vietnam
10 m air rifle team	Indonesia; Dewi Laila Mubarokah; Dominique Rachmawati Karini; Yasmin Figlia Achadiat	Vietnam; Lê Thị Mộng Tuyền; Phí Thanh Thảo; Nguyễn Thị Thảo	Singapore; Gan Xin Chen; Ho Xiu Yi; Martina Lindsay Amos
50 m rifle three positions	Gan Chen Jie; Malaysia	Audrey Zahra Dhiyaanisa; Indonesia	Adele Tan; Singapore
50 m rifle three positions team	Singapore; Jasmine Ser; Adele Tan; Martina Lindsay Amos	Malaysia; Gan Chen Jie; Alia Husna Badruddin; Nur Suryani Taibi	Thailand; Jayden Mohprasit; Thanyalak Chotphibunsin; Ratchadaporn Plengsaengthong

Mixed

Event	Gold	Silver	Bronze
10 m air pistol team	Indonesia; Arista Perdana Putri Darmoyo; Muhamad Iqbal Raia Prabowo	Vietnam; Trịnh Thu Vinh; Phạm Quang Huy	Malaysia; Joseline Lee Yean Cheah; Johnathan Wong
10 m air pistol team	Indonesia; Arista Perdana Putri Darmoyo; Muhamad Iqbal Raia Prabowo	Vietnam; Trịnh Thu Vinh; Phạm Quang Huy	Thailand; Natsara Champalat; Pongpol Kulchairattana
10 m air rifle team	Vietnam; Nguyễn Tâm Quang; Lê Thị Mộng Tuyền	Thailand; Chanittha Sastwej; Napis Tortungpanich	Singapore; Zaccheus Chong Kwan Ing; Martina Lindsay Amos
10 m air rifle team	Vietnam; Nguyễn Tâm Quang; Lê Thị Mộng Tuyền	Thailand; Chanittha Sastwej; Napis Tortungpanich	Malaysia; Gan Chen Jie; Haritz Iklil Hessly Hafiz

=== Shotgun ===
Event	Gold	Silver	Bronze
Men's skeet	Low Jiang Hao; Singapore	Enrique Leandro Enriquez; Philippines	Joseph Lee Joon Kit; Malaysia
Men's trap	Ong Chee Keng; Malaysia	Hagen Alexander Topacio; Philippines	Boki Andreas Yunus; Indonesia
Men's sporting clay team	Thailand; Kongphart Tantichirasakul; Keetaphong Sirisangsawang; Kanisorn Panitpichetvong; Patrapee Chuntongsuk	Philippines; Carlo Lorenzo Baltonado; Richard Gomez; Joaquin Miguel Ancheta; Eduardo Angelo III Rivilla	Malaysia; Benjamim Cheng Jie Khor; Wong Boon Kiat; Nicholas Newell Bateman; Khor Seng Chye
Men's compak sporting team	Thailand; Kongphart Tantichirasakul; Keetaphong Sirisangsawang; Kanisorn Panitpichetvong	Singapore; Laurence John Wee; Loo Wing Kien; Ian David Thomas	Philippines; Carlo Lorenzo Baltonado; Richard Gomez; Joaquin Miguel Ancheta
Women's skeet	Isarapa Imprasertsuk; Thailand	Yemima Natalia Sinaga; Indonesia	Tipvipa Kittikasemsak; Thailand
Women's trap	Fany Febriana Wulandari; Indonesia	Chattaya Kitcharoen; Thailand	Siti Mastura Binte Rahim; Singapore

=== Practical shooting ===
Event	Gold	Silver	Bronze
Men's open	Veeravit Jarukiatpongsa; Thailand	Prabu Rakyan Raka Nalyndra; Indonesia	Gerard Loy; Philippines
Men's production	Vincentius Djajadiningrat; Indonesia	Nattaphum Kamolwong; Thailand	Aeron John Lanuza; Philippines
Men's production optic	Edcel John Gino; Philippines	Phiranat Tanpairoh; Thailand	Muhammad Awaludin Ilham; Indonesia
Men's standard	Rolly Nathaniel Tecson; Philippines	Nathawat Nokthaisong; Thailand	Hans Christian Pratama; Indonesia
Women's open	Erin Mattea Micor; Philippines	Sarah Ayu Tamaela; Indonesia	Mintra Pramote; Thailand
Women's production	Kanyanat Prasertcharoensuk; Thailand	Evelyn Woods; Philippines	Missy Jaafar; Malaysia
Women's production optic	Genesis Pible; Philippines	Thanawadee Perkyam; Thailand	Sukmawati Abdullah; Indonesia
Women's standard	Pattharathida Makaew; Thailand	Putri Azzizah Haryanto; Indonesia	Stefanie Kathrene Lee; Philippines
