= Oh Ye-jin =

South Korean pistol shooter (born 2005)

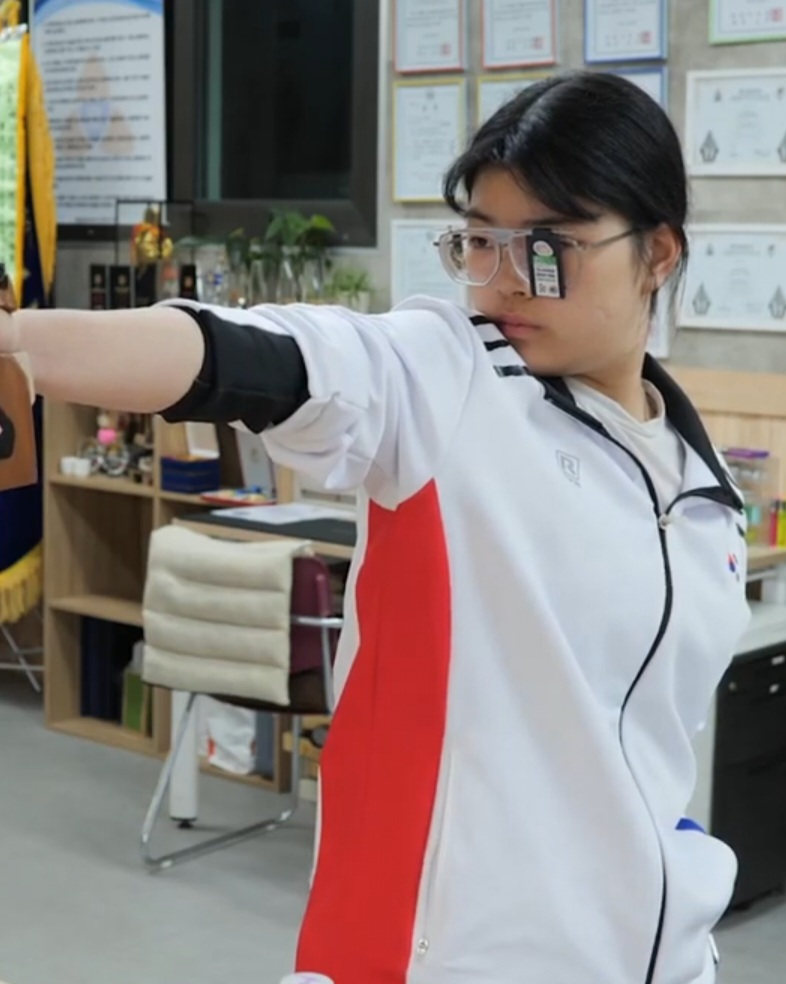
- Oh in 2023

Personal information
- Born: 10 May 2005 (age 21) Hacheon-ri, Pyoseon-myeon, Namjeju, South Korea
- Website: elin_.oo on Instagram

Sport
- Country: South Korea
- Sport: Sports shooting
Medal record
Women's Shooting
Representing South Korea
Olympic Games
Gold medal – first place	2024 Paris	10 metre air pistol
World Championships
Gold medal – first place	2025 Cairo	25 m pistol team
Silver medal – second place	2026 Doha	25 m pistol team
Bronze medal – third place	2025 Cairo	10 m air pistol team
Bronze medal – third place	2025 Cairo	10 m air pistol mixed team
Bronze medal – third place	2026 Doha	10 m air pistol team
World Cup
Gold medal – first place	2023 Jakarta	10 m air pistol
Gold medal – first place	2023 Jakarta	10 m air pistol team
Bronze medal – third place	2024 Munich	10 m air pistol mixed team
Bronze medal – third place	2025 Ningbo	10 m air pistol
Asian Games
Silver medal – second place	2026 Aichi–Nagoya	10 m air pistol team
Silver medal – second place	2026 Aichi–Nagoya	25 m air pistol team
Asian Championships
Gold medal – first place	2023 Changwon	10 m air pistol
Gold medal – first place	2023 Changwon	10 m air pistol team
Silver medal – second place	2025 Shymkent	25 m pistol team
Junior World Championships
Silver medal – second place	2023 Changwon	10 m air pistol

Oh Ye-jin (Korean: 오예진; born 10 May 2005) is a South Korean pistol shooter. She won the gold medal in the women's 10 metre air pistol event at the 2024 Summer Olympics with a score of 243.2, an Olympic record.

== Biography ==
Oh was born in Jeju Province, South Korea.

== See also ==
- Kim Ye-ji (sport shooter)
- Yusuf Dikeç
