= Anna Janssen =

German sport shooter (born 2001)

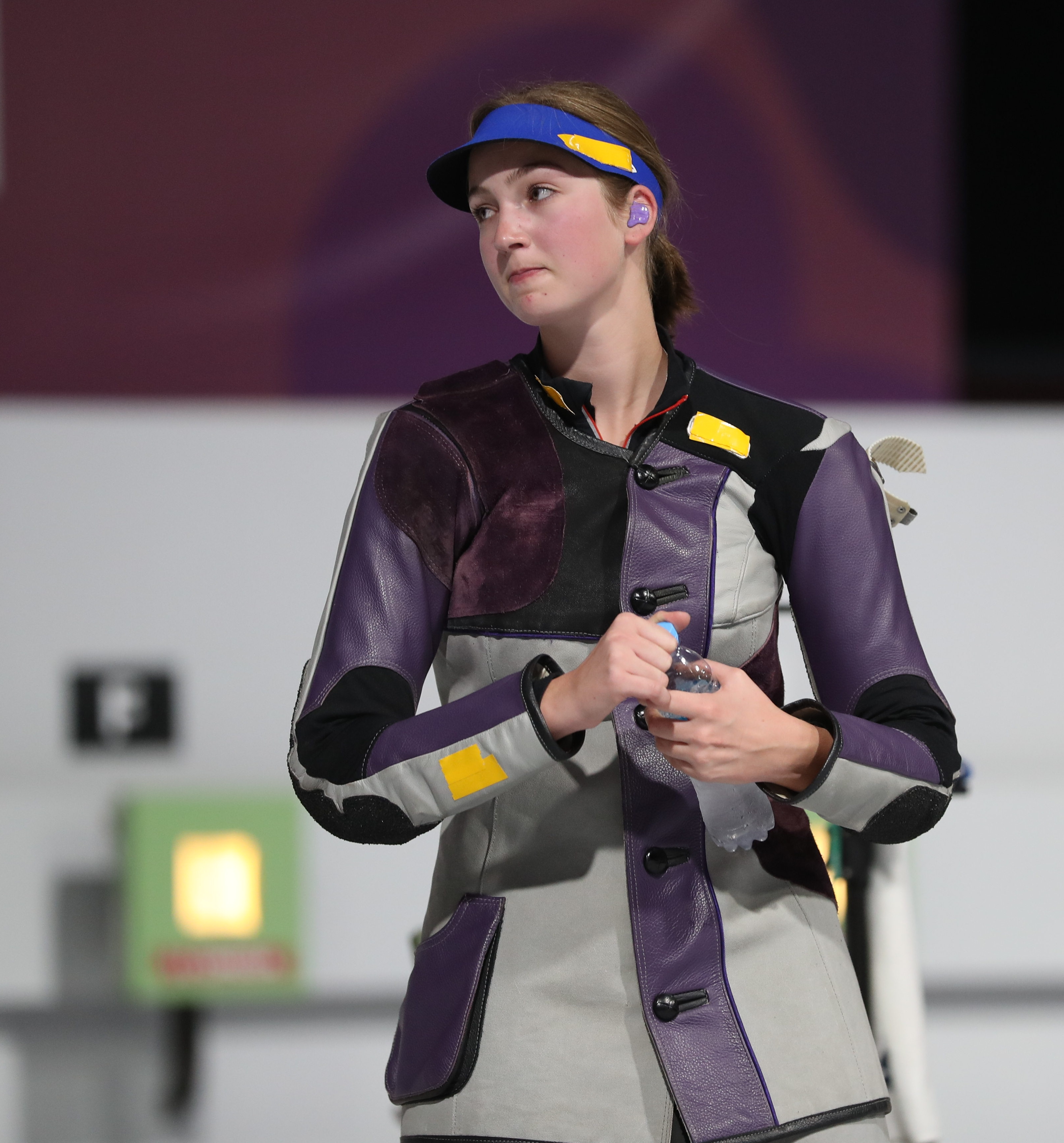

Personal information
- Nationality: German
- Born: 28 August 2001 (age 24)

Sport
- Country: Germany
- Sport: Shooting
- Event: Air rifle
- Club: SSG Kevelaer
Medal record
Women's shooting
Representing Germany
World Championships
Gold medal – first place	2022 Cairo	50 m rifle 3 positions team
Bronze medal – third place	2022 Cairo	50 m rifle 3 positions mixed team
Bronze medal – third place	2023 Baku	10 m air rifle team
European Games
Bronze medal – third place	2023 Wrocław	50 m rifle 3 positions team
European Championships
Bronze medal – third place	2023 Tallinn	10 m air rifle
Bronze medal – third place	2023 Tallinn	10 m air rifle team
Gold medal – first place	2024 Győr	10 m air rifle
Gold medal – first place	2024 Győr	10 m air rifle team
Gold medal – first place	2024 Győr	10 m air rifle mixedteam
Silver medal – second place	2026 Yerevan	10 m air rifle
Silver medal – second place	2026 Yerevan	10 m air rifle team mixed
World Cup
Gold medal – first place	2022 Rio de Janeiro	10 m air rifle
Gold medal – first place	2022 Rio de Janeiro	10 m air rifle team
Silver medal – second place	2022 Rio de Janeiro	10 m air rifle mixed team
Gold medal – first place	2022 Changwon	50 m rifle 3 positions
Gold medal – first place	2022 Changwono	50 m rifle 3 positions team
Bronze medal – third place	2022 Changwon	50 m rifle 3 positions mixed team
Gold medal – first place	2023 Rio de Janeiro	10 m air rifle mixed team
Gold medal – first place	2024 Cairo	10 m air rifle
Gold medal – first place	2024 Cairo	10 m air rifle mixed team
Gold medal – first place	2024 Granada	10 m air rifle mixed team
Bronze medal – third place	2024 Granada	10 m air rifle
Gold medal – first place	2024 Baku	50 m rifle 3 positions
Bronze medal – third place	2024 Baku	50 m rifle 3 positions team

Anna Janssen (born 8 August 2001) is a German sport shooter. Since 2022, she has won several World Cup victories in both the air rifle and small-caliber three-position competition. In 2022, she became world champion with the team in the 50 m 3 positions competition and was world number one in the 10 m air rifle discipline in 2024. On 15 October 2024, she set the world record for 10 m air rifle with 636.9 rings.

== Early career ==
Anna Janssen grew up in the Berendonk neighbourhood of Kevelaer. She started shooting as a child together with her twin sister Franka Janssen, following in the footsteps of her older brother. Her home club is the Schieß-Sport-Gemeinschaft (SSG) Kevelaer. She was encouraged early on by club and state coach Rudi Joosten and was accepted into the Rhineland squad. Janssen made her first appearance at international level in 2017 when she won the silver medal with the air rifle at the Junior World Championships in Suhl. In 2018, she became the European junior champion in Győr in the individual and team competitions. She also took part in the 2018 Summer Youth Olympic Games in Buenos Aires, where she finished fourth in the air rifle. In the following years, Janssen celebrated further successes in the junior field and became a two-time world champion with the small-caliber rifle (in prone shooting and the mixed three-position competition with Max Braun) at her last title competitions as a junior in Lima in 2021.

== Professional career ==
Janssen made her first appearance in the adult World Cup as a junior in 2019. During the COVID-19 pandemic, there were no international competitions for months in 2020. Janssen later spoke of this time as a motivational crisis: she said it took her some effort to train because the forced break made her realize how time-consuming the sport is. She participated in the 2021 European Championships in Osijek. She finished twelfth as the best German athlete in the air rifle competition, missing out on qualification for the Olympic Games in Tokyo. In 2022, Janssen rose to the top of the international rankings with World Cup victories in Rio de Janeiro and Changwon. She qualified for the World Cup final of the best twelve female shooters in Cairo with both the small-bore rifle and the air rifle, where she won the three-position competition with the small-bore rifle. Janssen also 2022 ISSF World Shooting Championships became world champion with the small-bore rifle team in 2022 and led SSG Kevelaer to the German championship title for the third time.

In February 2023, readers of the German ShootingMagazine (SchützenZeitung) of the German Shooting Association voted her Shooter of the Year 2022. Soon after she won a bronze medal in both the 10 m air rifle and 10 m air rifle team competition at the 2023 European Championships in Tallinn. After mixed results at several World Cups, Janssen won third place with the team in the three-position competition at the 2023 European Games. In August of the same year, she also won the bronze medal at the 2023 Shooting World Championships in Baku, this time with the team in the 10 m air rifle competition.

In 2024, Janssen celebrated several victories at World Cups and the European Championships in Győr and qualified to participate in the Anna Janssen's dream of participating at the Olympics in Paris becomes reality. At the time, Janssen was one of the few top female shooters worldwide who did not earn money by working for a government agency such as the police or the military. She received most of her financial support from her parents' horticultural business and the German Sports Aid Foundation, and she also had local sponsors. In spring 2024, Janssen was ranked first in the world in the air rifle[16] and second in the world in the small-bore three-position event.

At the Olympic Games, Janssen qualified for the mixed bronze medal match with her fellow marksman Maximillian Ulbrich. They lost to the Kazakh duo Le/Sätbajew after 60 shots with 1.1 points 630.8 to 629.7 rings and thus took fourth place.
