= Yang Ji-in =

South Korean sports shooter (born 2003)

Personal information
- Nationality: South Korea
- Born: 20 May 2003 (age 23) Namwon, South Korea

Sport
- Sport: Shooting
Medal record
Women's shooting
Representing South Korea
Olympic Games
Gold medal – first place	2024 Paris	25 m pistol
World Championships
Gold medal – first place	2025 Cairo	25 m pistol
Gold medal – first place	2025 Cairo	25 m pistol team
Gold medal – first place	2026 Doha	25 m pistol
Silver medal – second place	2022 Cairo	25 m pistol team junior
Silver medal – second place	2026 Doha	25 m pistol team
Bronze medal – third place	2022 Cairo	10 m pistol team junior
Bronze medal – third place	2025 Cairo	10 m air pistol team
Bronze medal – third place	2026 Doha	10 m air pistol team
World Cup
Gold medal – first place	2024 Baku	25 m pistol
Asian Games
Silver medal – second place	2026 Aichi–Nagoya	25 meter pistol team
Bronze medal – third place	2022 Hangzhou	25 meter pistol
Bronze medal – third place	2022 Hangzhou	25 meter pistol team
Asian Championships
Gold medal – first place	2024 Jakarta	25 m pistol
Silver medal – second place	2025 Shymkent	10 m air pistol
Silver medal – second place	2025 Shymkent	10 m air pistol team
Silver medal – second place	2025 Shymkent	25 m pistol team

Yang Ji-in (Korean: 양지인; born 20 May 2003) is a South Korean sport shooter. She specialises in the 25 m pistol events. She won a gold medal at the 2024 Summer Olympics. In October 2024, She was honored as the female athlete of the year by the International Shooting Sport Federation(ISSF), celebrating her outstanding accomplishments in sport shooting.

== Career ==
She was a bronze medalist in the 2022 Asian Games in Hangzhou. In the 2023 ISSF World Shooting Championships, she won a silver medal, second to Kim Ye-ji. Yang at 2022 ISSF World Championships Won Silver Medal With Kim min-seo and Kim Ye-seol in 25m pistol team Junior and theirs Won Bronze Medal In 10m air pistol team Junior. She was a gold medal at the 2024 ISSF World Cup Baku in 25 meter pistol. and she won gold medal at the 2024 Asian Rifle/Pistol Championships Jakarta In 25 metre pistol

== Biography ==
Her father was a boxer. She attended Korea National Sport University.
