= Manu Bhaker =

Indian sport shooter (born 2002)

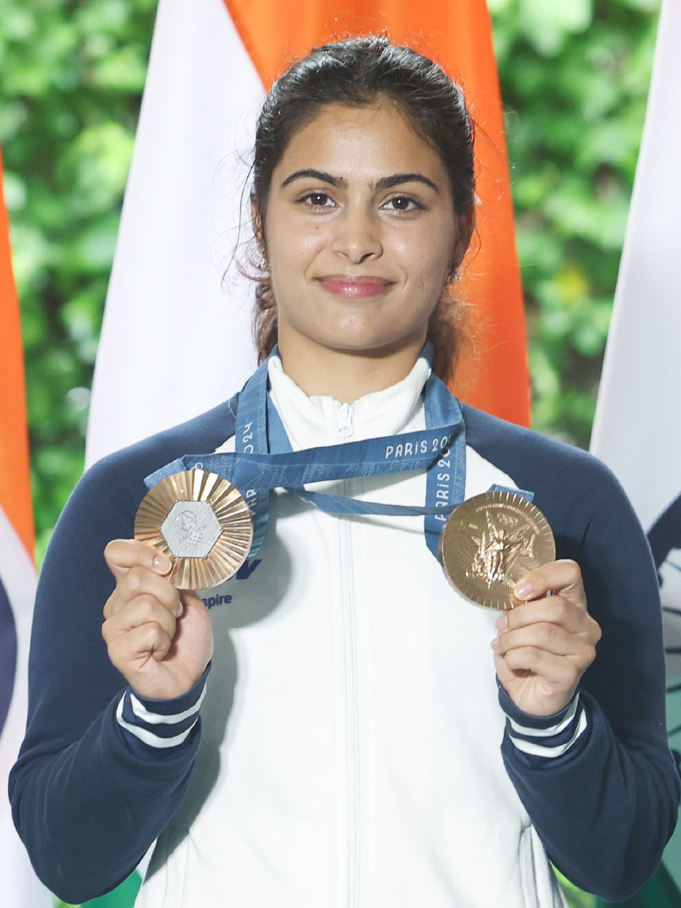
- Bhaker in 2024

Personal information
- Born: 18 February 2002 (age 24) Goria, Haryana, India
- Education: IIM Rohtak; DAV College; Lady Shri Ram College
- Height: 1.68 m (5 ft 6 in)
- Weight: 60 kg (132 lb)

Sport
- Sport: Shooting
- Events: 10 meter air pistol; 25 meter pistol
- Coached by: Jaspal Rana

Achievements and titles
- Olympic finals: (bronze) x2
- World finals: (gold) x14 (silver) x5 (bronze) x4
- Regional finals: (gold) x6 (silver) x1 (bronze) x5
- Commonwealth finals: (gold) x1
- Highest world ranking: 2
- Personal bests: 244.7 (2019); 593 AGR (2018)
Medal record
Women's shooting
Representing India
Event	1st	2nd	3rd
Olympic Games	0	0	2
World Championships	2	3	0
Commonwealth Games	1	0	0
Asian Games	1	0	0
Asian Championships	5	1	5
World Cup	13	4	5
Youth Olympic Games	1	1	0
Junior World Championships	4	0	1
Junior World Cup	5	3	0
World University Games	2	0	0
Total	34	12	13
Event	1st	2nd	3rd
10 meter air pistol	27	9	8
25 meter pistol	6	2	5
Total	33	11	13
Olympic Games
Bronze medal – third place	2024 Paris	10 m air pistol
Bronze medal – third place	2024 Paris	10 m air pistol mixed team
World Championships
Gold medal – first place	2023 Baku	25 m pistol team
Gold medal – first place	2026 Doha	25 m pistol team
Silver medal – second place	2022 Cairo	25 m pistol team
Silver medal – second place	2025 Cairo	10 m air pistol team
Silver medal – second place	2026 Doha	10 m air pistol team
Commonwealth Games
Gold medal – first place	2018 Gold Coast	10 m air pistol
Asian Games
Gold medal – first place	2022 Hangzhou	25 m pistol team
Asian Championships
Gold medal – first place	2019 Doha	10 m air pistol
Gold medal – first place	2019 Doha	10 m air pistol mixed team
Gold medal – first place	2019 Taoyuan	10 m air pistol
Gold medal – first place	2019 Taoyuan	10 m air pistol mixed team
Gold medal – first place	2026 New Delhi	10 m air pistol team
Gold medal – first place	2026 New Delhi	25 m air pistol team
Silver medal – second place	2023 Changwon	25 m pistol team
Silver medal – second place	2026 New Delhi	25 m air pistol
Bronze medal – third place	2019 Doha	10 m air pistol team
Bronze medal – third place	2019 Taoyuan	10 m air pistol team
Bronze medal – third place	2025 Shymkent	10 m air pistol
Bronze medal – third place	2025 Shymkent	10 m air pistol team
Bronze medal – third place	2025 Shymkent	25 m pistol team
World Cup
Gold medal – first place	2018 Guadalajara	10 m air pistol
Gold medal – first place	2018 Guadalajara	10 m air pistol mixed team
Gold medal – first place	2019 New Delhi	10 m air pistol mixed team
Gold medal – first place	2019 Beijing	10 m air pistol mixed team
Gold medal – first place	2019 Munich	10 m air pistol mixed team
Gold medal – first place	2019 Rio	10 m air pistol mixed team
Gold medal – first place	2019 Putian	10 m air pistol
Gold medal – first place	2019 Putian	10 m air pistol mixed team
Gold medal – first place	2021 New Delhi	10 m air pistol team
Gold medal – first place	2021 New Delhi	10 m air pistol mixed team
Gold medal – first place	2021 New Delhi	25 m pistol team
Gold medal – first place	2021 Wroclaw	10 m air pistol mixed team
Gold medal – first place	2021 Wroclaw	25 m pistol mixed team
Silver medal – second place	2021 New Delhi	10 m air pistol
Silver medal – second place	2021 Osijek	10 m air pistol mixed team
Silver medal – second place	2025 Lima	10 m air pistol
Silver medal – second place	2026 Munich	10 m air pistol mixed team
Bronze medal – third place	2021 New Delhi	25 m pistol
Bronze medal – third place	2021 Osijek	10 m air pistol team
Bronze medal – third place	2023 Bhopal	25 m pistol
Bronze medal – third place	2024 Granada	10 m air pistol
Bronze medal – third place	2026 Hangzhou	25 m pistol
Youth Olympic Games
Gold medal – first place	2018 Buenos Aires	10 m air pistol
Silver medal – second place	2018 Buenos Aires	10 m air pistol mixed team
Junior World Championships
Gold medal – first place	2021 Lima	10 m air pistol
Gold medal – first place	2021 Lima	10 m air pistol team
Gold medal – first place	2021 Lima	10 m air pistol mixed team
Gold medal – first place	2021 Lima	25 m pistol team
Bronze medal – third place	2021 Lima	25 m pistol
Junior World Cup
Gold medal – first place	2018 Sydney	10 m air pistol
Gold medal – first place	2018 Sydney	10 m air pistol mixed team
Gold medal – first place	2018 Suhl	10 m air pistol
Gold medal – first place	2022 Suhl	25 m pistol team
Gold medal – first place	2022 Suhl	10 m air pistol team
Silver medal – second place	2018 Suhl	10 m air pistol mixed team
Silver medal – second place	2022 Suhl	10 m air pistol
Silver medal – second place	2022 Suhl	25 m pistol
World University Games
Gold medal – first place	2021 Chengdu	10 m air pistol
Gold medal – first place	2021 Chengdu	10 m air pistol team
Youth Asian Championships
Silver medal – second place	2017 Wako City	10 m air pistol

Manu Bhaker (born 18 February 2002) is an Indian sport shooter. She has 2 medals at the Olympic Games, 23 medals at the World Championships and World Cups, as well as 12 medals at the Asian Games and Asian Championships. At the 2024 Olympics, she became the first Indian woman shooter to win a medal by clinching the bronze in the 10m pistol event. She won another bronze in 10m pistol mixed team, becoming the first Indian to win two medals in a single Olympic Games. Bhaker is also the youngest Indian to win gold medals at the World Cup.

She has won gold at the Commonwealth and Asian Games. While she won the gold at the 2022 Asian Games in the women's 25m pistol team event, Bhaker won the gold at the 2018 Commonwealth Games in the 10-metre air pistol event. She set a Commonwealth Games record during the same edition. In 2018, a 16 year old Bhaker was the youngest Indian to win gold at the World Cup.

== Early life ==
Bhaker was born in Goria village of Jhajjar district in Haryana. Her father Ram Kishan Bhaker is a chief engineer in the Merchant Navy. Her mother, Sumedha Bhaker, is a former school principal with a master's in Sanskrit, who hails from an educationist family of Kalali village in Charkhi Dadri.

Bhaker did her schooling at Universal Higher Senior Secondary School in Goria, which was started by her grandfather Raj Karan. During her schooling, she participated in sports such as tennis, skating, Manipuri martial-art thang-ta and boxing. She earned several medals at the National Games in these sports. As a 14-year-old, she decided to focus on the sport of shooting, and with an investment of ₹1,50,000 by her father, she started her training.

Her mother provided guidance throughout her schooling, and introduced her to the Bhagavad Gita which helped Bhaker cope during her tense times.

At a young age of 15, Bhaker became one of the top female shooters in India, winning multiple gold medals at the 2017 National games. Along with her sports, she kept her education going and went on to study political science at Lady Shri Ram College, New Delhi, graduating in 2022. Later obtained a master's degree in public administration at DAV College, Chandigarh in 2024. She is currently pursuing a Postgraduate Diploma in Sports Management at Indian Institute of Management Rohtak.

== Career ==
=== Beginnings (2016–2020) ===
In 2016, Bhaker started training with her first coach, Anil Jakhar and prepared for the junior world tournaments. She earned her first success at the international level when she won the silver medal at the 2017 Asian Junior Championships. In the 2017 National games held at Kerala, Bhaker won nine gold medals and defeated multiple World Cup medalist Heena Sidhu and broke Sidhu's record of 240.8 points, scoring 242.3 points in the final.

In the 2018 International Shooting Sport Federation World Cup held at Guadalajara, Mexico. Bhaker won the gold medal in the Women's 10-meter air pistol, defeating Mexico's Alejandra Zavala, a two-time champion. Bhaker scored 237.5 the final match against Zavalaa, who scored 237.1.

Bhaker won her second gold medal at the World Cup in the 10-meter Air Pistol mixed team event. She was paired with fellow countryman Om Prakash Mitharval. The pair shot a score of 476.1 points, defeating Sandra Reitz and Christian Reitz who scored 475.2.

Bhaker scored 388/400 points at 2018 Commonwealth Games in women's 10m air pistol qualifying round and qualified for the finals. In the final round of the women's 10m air pistol event during the Gold Coast Commonwealth Games, she secured the gold medal with setting a new Commonwealth Games record of 240.9 points.

In 2018 Asian Games, she scored a game's record score of 593 in the qualification round of 25m Air pistol event. But she failed to win a medal there, as she finished 6th in the final. Eventually, her compatriot Rahi Sarnobat clinched the Gold in this event.

At the Youth Olympics 2018, Manu Bhaker shot 236.5 to stand at the top of the points table in the women's 10m air pistol event. The Indian flag bearer at the opening ceremony of the Youth Olympics is also the World Cup and Commonwealth Games gold medalist. The 16-year-old Manu became the first shooter from India and the first female athlete from India to grab a gold medal at the Youth Olympic Games.

In 2018, national pistol coach Jaspal Rana was the mentor for Bhaker and said that “ Manu is mentally very strong" and we need to groom talented shooters like her for the 2020 Olympics”.

In February 2019 she won the gold medal in the 10m air pistol mixed team event at 2019 ISSF World Cup in Delhi.

In May 2019 she qualified for the 2020 Tokyo Olympics in the 10m pistol event via a fourth place finish at the Munich ISSF World Cup. This came days after her pistol jammed in the finals of the 25m pistol event when she was leading, eventually forcing her to forfeit due to her gun not being able to fire.

In all the four Pistol & Rifle ISSF World Cups in 2019, she won the gold medal in the 10m air pistol mixed event with Saurabh Chaudhry as her partner, making the pair a strong contender for the 2020 Tokyo Olympics.

=== Rising star (2021–2024) ===
In the delayed 2020 Summer Olympics, Bhaker faced multiple problems, including pistol malfunction, which led to her missing the finals for both the 10m and 25m air pistol. She partnered Saurabh Chaudhary in the mixed 10m air pistol team, but in spite of finishing the qualifying round with the highest score, she finished only eighth in the next round and missed the final. After the Tokyo Olympics, she was very disappointed but soon found motivation from the Bhagavad Gita verses such as “Focus on karma, not on the outcome of the karma.”

At the 2022 Asian Games, Bhaker won the team gold for India in the women's 25m pistol team event, along with Esha Singh and Rhythm Sangwan.

In 2023, Bhaker re-united with her coach, Jaspal Rana, to prepare for the 2024 Olympics, and the reinstatement of Rana was supported by IOC president PT Usha. Rana developed a rigorous training schedule for Bhaker by replicating the routine of Olympic matches in their daily schedule.

At the 2024 Summer Olympics in Paris, Bhaker won two bronze medals. First, she won bronze in the women's 10 metre air pistol event, becoming the first female shooter from India to win a medal at any Olympics. Next, she won another bronze medal in the mixed 10 metre air pistol team event, wherein she partnered with teammate, Sarabjot Singh. She became the first Indian to win two medals at an Olympics since independence of India. Bhaker has credited her coach, Jaspal Rana for helping her win the double bronze medals at the 2024 Paris Olympics.

In 2025, she was awarded the Khel Ratna, India's highest sporting honour, for her consistent performance in shooting, making her the youngest Indian shooter to receive the award.

== Performance record ==
=== Olympic Games ===
Year	Venue	Event	Rank	Score
2020	(Japan) Tokyo	10m air pistol women	12th	575
2020	(Japan) Tokyo	25m pistol women	15th	582
2020	(Japan) Tokyo	10m air pistol mixed team	7th	Stage 1: 582; Stage 2: 380
2024	(France) Paris	10m air pistol women	3rd	Qualification: 580; Final: 221.7
2024	(France) Paris	10m air pistol mixed team	3rd	Qualification: 580; Final: 16–10
2024	(France) Paris	25m pistol women	4th	Qualification: 590; Final: 28

=== World Championship ===
Year	Venue	Event	Rank	Score
2018	(South Korea) Changwon	10m air pistol women	13th	Score: 574
2018	(South Korea) Changwon	Mixed team 10m air pistol women	12th	Score: 767
2018	(South Korea) Changwon	25m pistol women	10th	Score: 584

=== World Cup ===
Year	Venue	Event	Rank	Score
2021	New Delhi	10m air pistol women	2nd	Score: 577; Final: 236.7
2019	Putian	10m air pistol women	1st	Score: 578; Final: 244.7
2019	Munich	10m air pistol women	4th	Score: 582; Final: 201.0
2019	New Delhi	10m air pistol women	14th	Score: 573
2019	Beijing	10m air pistol women	17th	Score: 575
2018	Guadalajara	10m air pistol women	1st	Score: 772; Final: 337.5
2018	Changwon	10m air pistol women	30th	Score: 571
2018	Munich	10m air pistol women	47th	Score: 567

Year	Venue	Event	Rank	Score
2018	Guadalajara	25m pistol women	5th	Score: 581; Final: 19
2019	New Delhi	25m pistol women	5th	Score: 590; Final: 22
2019	Munich	25m pistol women	5th	Score: 585; Final: 21
2019	Beijing	25m pistol women	17th	Score: 82

Year	Venue	Event	Rank	Score
2021	New Delhi	Mixed 10m air pistol	1st place, gold medalist(s)	Score: 384; Final:16
2019	Putian	Mixed 10m air pistol	1st place, gold medalist(s)	Score: 387; Final: 17
2019	New Delhi	Mixed 10m air pistol	1st place, gold medalist(s)	Score: 778; Final: 483.4
2019	Beijing	Mixed 10m air pistol	1st place, gold medalist(s)	Score: 482; Final: 16
2019	Munich	Mixed 10m air pistol	1st place, gold medalist(s)	Score: 591; Final: 17
2018	Guadalajara	Mixed 10m air pistol	1st place, gold medalist(s)	Score: 770; Final: 476.1
2018	Changwon	Mixed 10m air pistol	4th	Score: 778; Final: 378.6
2018	Munich	Mixed 10m air pistol	34th	Score: 758

=== Youth Olympics ===
Year	Venue	Event	Rank	Score
2018	Buenos Aires	10m air pistol women	1st place, gold medalist(s)	Score: 576; Final: 236.5
2018	Buenos Aires	Mixed team 10m air pistol	2nd place, silver medalist(s)	Score: 751; Final: 3

=== Junior World Championship ===
Year	Venue	Event	Rank	Score
2021	Lima	10m air pistol women	1st place, gold medalist(s)	Score: 574; Final: 241.3

=== Junior World Cup ===
Year	Venue	Event	Rank	Score
2018	Sydney	10-meter air pistol women	1st place, gold medalist(s)	Score: 570; Final: 235.9
2018	Sydney	Mixed team 10m pistol air	1st place, gold medalist(s)	Score: 770; Final: 478.9
2018	Sydney	25m pistol women	4th	Score: 574; Final: 18
2018	Suhl	10m air pistol women	1st place, gold medalist(s)	Score: 573; Final: 242.5
2018	Suhl	25m pistol women	5th	Score: 579; Final: 19
2018	Suhl	Mixed team 10m air pistol	2nd place, silver medalist(s)	Score: 766; Final: 474.4

== Awards and nominations ==
Year	Award	Category	Result	Ref
2019	Delhi Sports Journalists Awards	Best Sportsperson of the Year	Won	
2019	Indian Sports Honours	Emerging Sportswoman of the Year	Won	
2019	Indian Sports Honours	Women's Breakthrough of the Year	Nominated	
2020	Arjuna Award	Outstanding Performance in Sports	Won	
2021	BBC Awards	Sportswoman of the Year	Nominated	
2021	BBC Awards	Emerging Sportswoman of the Year	Won	
2024	BBC Awards	Sportswoman of the Year	Nominated	
2024	Indian Sports Honours	Sportswoman of the Year	Won	
2025	Khel Ratna Award	Spectacular Performance in Sports	Won	
2025	Sportstar Awards	Sportstar of the Year Female	Won	
2025	Sportstar Awards	Sportswoman of the Year	Won	
2025	BBC Awards	Sportswoman of the Year	Won	
2025	Times of India Sports Awards	Sportsperson of the Year Female	Won	
2025	Times of India Sports Awards	Shooter of the Year Female	Won	
2025	Bhogeswar Baruah National Sports Awards	Sportsperson of the Year	Won	
