= Xie Yu (sport shooter) =

Chinese sport shooter

Personal information
- Born: 12 June 2000 (age 26) Guizhou, China

Sport
- Country: China
- Sport: Sports shooting
Medal record
Men's shooting
Representing China
Olympic Games
Gold medal – first place	2024 Paris	10 m air pistol
World Championships
Gold medal – first place	2023 Baku	50 m pistol
Gold medal – first place	2026 Doha	10 m air pistol team
Asian Games
Gold medal – first place	2026 Aichi-Nagoya	10 m air pistol team
World Cup
Gold medal – first place	2024 Baku	10 m air pistol
Silver medal – second place	2024 Munich	10 m air pistol mixed team
Bronze medal – third place	2024 Baku	10 m air pistol mixed team

Xie Yu (simplified Chinese: 谢瑜; traditional Chinese: 謝瑜; pinyin: Xiè Yú; born 12 June 2000) is a Chinese sport shooter. He competed at the 2024 Summer Olympics, winning the gold medal in the men's 10 metre air pistol event.
