= Trịnh Thu Vinh =

Vietnamese sport shooter

Personal information
- Nationality: Vietnamese
- Born: 21 September 2000 (age 26) Thạch Thành, Thanh Hóa, Vietnam

Sport
- Country: Vietnam
- Sport: Shooting
- Events: 10 metre air pistol, 25 metre pistol
- Coached by: Park Chung-gun
Medal record
Women's shooting
Representing Vietnam
World Championships
Silver medal – second place	2026 Doha	25 m pistol
Bronze medal – third place	2026 Doha	25 m pistol team
Asian Games
Bronze medal – third place	2026 Aichi–Nagoya	10 m air pistol team
Asian Rifle/Pistol Championships
Gold medal – first place	2024 Jakarta	10 m air pistol mixed team
Gold medal – first place	2025 Bangkok	10 m air pistol mixed team
Silver medal – second place	2026 New Delhi	10 m air pistol team
Bronze medal – third place	2025 Bangkok	10 m air pistol
Bronze medal – third place	2026 New Delhi	25 m air pistol team
Asian Shooting Championships
Bronze medal – third place	2023 Changwon	10 m air pistol
Bronze medal – third place	2025 Shymkent	25 m pistol
SEA Games
Gold medal – first place	2025 Bangkok–Chonburi	10 m air pistol team
Gold medal – first place	2025 Bangkok–Chonburi	10 m air pistol
Gold medal – first place	2025 Bangkok–Chonburi	25 m pistol team
Gold medal – first place	2025 Bangkok–Chonburi	25 m pistol
Silver medal – second place	2021 Hanoi	10 m air pistol team
Bronze medal – third place	2021 Hanoi	10 m air pistol

Trịnh Thu Vinh (born 21 September 2000) is a Vietnamese sport shooter. She competed at the 2024 Summer Olympics and finished 4th in the 10 metre air pistol event.

== Career ==
Thu Vinh started her sports career in 2014 at the Vietnam People's Public Security athletics team, training as a middle distance runner. After three years practicing athletics, she quit the sport after failing to achieve any results. Then, with the guidance of her coaches, she took up sports shooting. After only one year of training, Thu Vinh showed her potential with two gold medals (individual, team) and set a national youth record in the women's 10m air pistol event at the 2018 Vietnam's National Youth Air Pistol Championship.

At the 2021 SEA Games held in her home country Vietnam, Thu Vinh won a silver medal and bronze medal in the women's team and individual 10m air pistol event. She competed in the 2022 Asian Games and finished sixth at the women's 10 metre air pistol event.

In 2023, Thu Vinh qualified for the 2024 Summer Olympics after finishing fifth in the 10 metre air pistol event at the 2023 ISSF World Shooting Championships. At her debut appearance in the Olympic Games, she was ranked 4th in the 10 metre air pistol event, thus missed out the chance to win a medal. She also qualified to the final round of the 25 metre pistol event and finished at 7th place.
