= Keum Ji-hyeon =

South Korean sport shooter (born 2000)

Personal information
- Nationality: South Korean
- Born: 17 March 2000 (age 26) Ulsan, South Korea
- Height: 1.54 m (5 ft 1 in)
- Weight: 50 kg (110 lb)

Sport
- Country: South Korea
- Sport: Shooting
- Event: Air rifle
Medal record
Women's shooting
Representing the South Korea
Olympic Games
Silver medal – second place	2024 Paris	10 m air rifle mixed team
World Championships
Gold medal – first place	2018 Changwon	10 m air rifle team
World Cup
Gold medal – first place	2024 Baku	10 m air rifle
Gold medal – first place	2022 Baku	10 m air rifle mixed team
Gold medal – first place	2022 Changwon	10 m air rifle team
Bronze medal – third place	2019 Beijing	10 m air rifle
Bronze medal – third place	2019 New Delhi	10 m air rifle mixed team
Bronze medal – third place	2018 Changwon	10 m air rifle mixed team
Asian Championships
Gold medal – first place	2019 Doha	10 m air rifle mixed team
Silver medal – second place	2025 Shymkent	10 m air rifle team
Asian Airgun Championships
Silver medal – second place	2022 Daegu	10 m air rifle team

Keum Ji-hyeon (Korean: 금지현; born 17 March 2000) is a South Korean sport shooter who won the silver medal at the 2024 Summer Olympics in the mixed 10 metre air rifle event.

She participated at the 2018 ISSF World Shooting Championships.

Her daughter was born in May 2023.
