= Camille Jedrzejewski =

French sport shooter (born 2002)

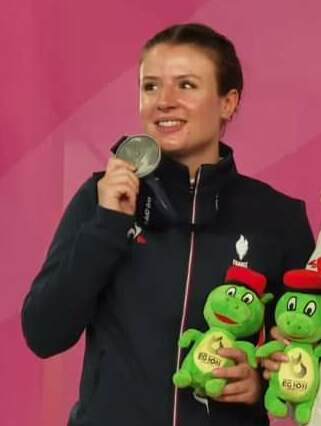
- Jedrzejewski at the 2023 European games

Personal information
- Nationality: French
- Born: 25 April 2002 (age 24) Compiègne, France

Sport
- Sport: Shooting
- Events: 10 metre air pistol; 25 metre pistol
Medal record
Women's shooting
Representing France
Olympic Games
Silver medal – second place	2024 Paris	25 meter Pistol
World Championships
Bronze medal – third place	2025 Cairo	25 meter pistol team
World Cup Final
Gold medal – first place	2022 Cairo	10 m air pistol
Silver medal – second place	2022 Cairo	25 m pistol
World Cup
Gold medal – first place	2022 Rio de Janeiro	25 m pistol
Gold medal – first place	2024 Baku	10 m air pistol
Gold medal – first place	2024 Munich	25 m pistol
Silver medal – second place	2022 Baku	10 m air pistol
Bronze medal – third place	2022 Rio de Janeiro	10 m air pistol
Bronze medal – third place	2022 Rio de Janeiro	10 m air pistol mixed team
European Shooting Championships
Gold medal – first place	2025 Châteauroux	25 m Pistol Team
Gold medal – first place	2024 Osijek	25 m Pistol
Silver medal – second place	2024 Osijek	25 m Pistol Team
European Games
Silver medal – second place	2023 Kraków–Małopolska	10 m air pistol
Silver medal – second place	2023 Kraków–Małopolska	10 m air pistol team
Mediterranean Games
Silver medal – second place	2022 Oran	10 m air pistol
Silver medal – second place	2022 Oran	10 m air pistol mixed team
Junior World Championships
Silver medal – second place	2021 Lima	25 m pistol
Bronze medal – third place	2021 Lima	25 m pistol team

Camille Jedrzejewski (born 25 April 2002) is a French sport shooter. She specialises in the 10m air pistol and 25m pistol events.

== Sporting Career ==
Jedrzejewski won two medals at the 2021 ISSF Junior World Championships, before qualifying for the ISSF World Cup Finals in 2022, winning a gold and silver medal.

At the 2023 European Games, she won an individual silver medal in the air pistol, as well as a silver medal in the women's air pistol team event.

At the 2024 European Championships she became European Champion in 25m pistol. She also won 25m pistol team silver alongside Mathilde Lamolle and Héloïse Fourré.

At the 2024 Olympic Games in Paris she won silver in the Women's 25m pistol.

== Personal life ==
Born in France, Jedrzejewski is of Polish descent. She is an officer in the Police Nationale.
