= National Shooting Centre (France) =

Shooting range in Chateauroux, France

- Centre national de tir sportif (CNTS)
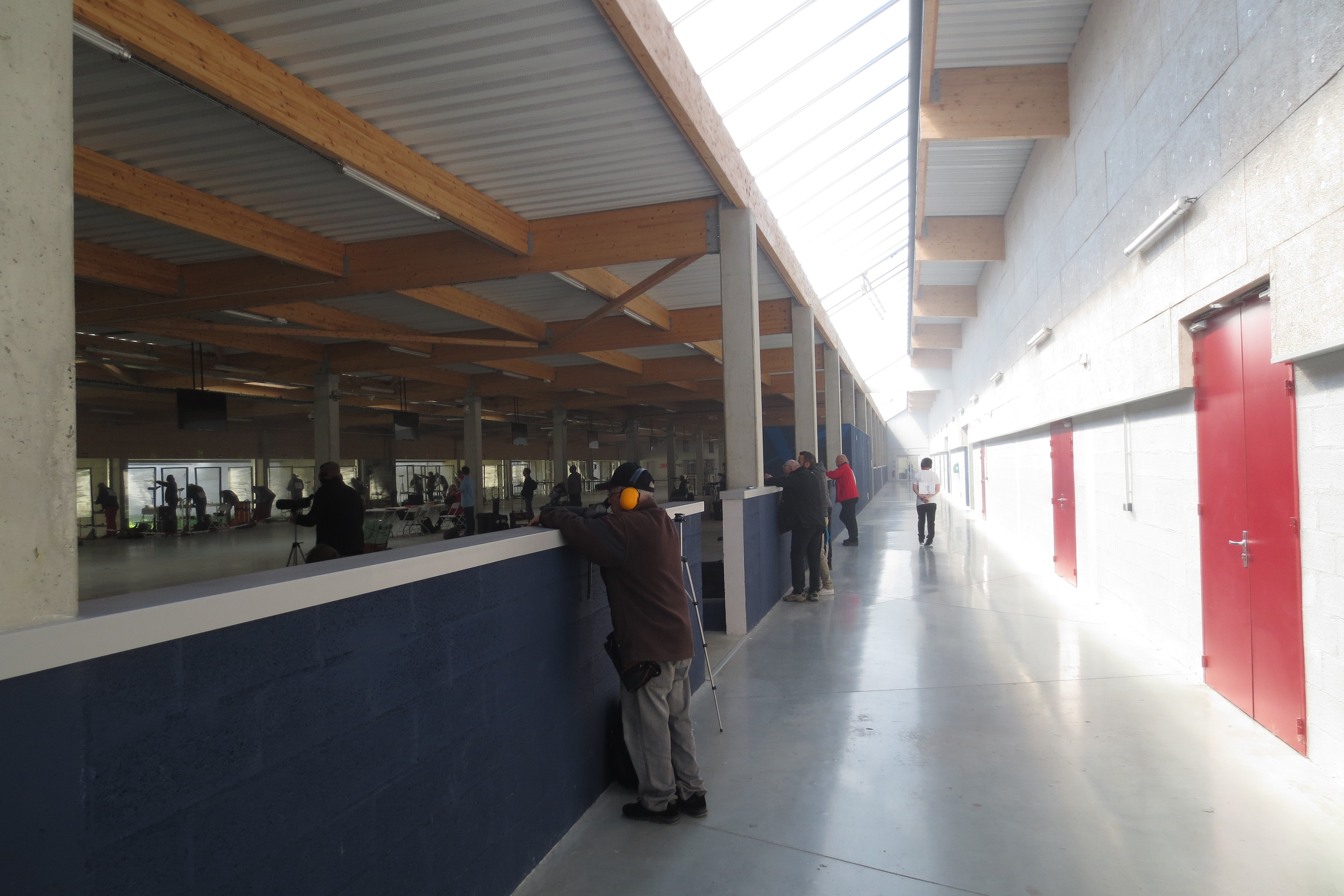
- Corridor serving the 25 and 50-meter firing points
- Interactive map of National Shooting Centre
- Address: Route de Lignières, RD 925, 36130 Déols; France
- Location: Châteauroux
- Coordinates: 46°48′56″N 1°45′35″E
- Owner: French Shooting Federation
- Operator: French Shooting Federation
- Current use: Shooting Sports

Construction
- Groundbreaking: 2016
- Opened: 2018

Website
- www.cntir.com

The National Shooting Centre (French: Centre National de Tir Sportif) (CNTS) is a shooting range in Châteauroux, France, owned by the French Shooting Federation (FFTir). The site includes shooting facilities for all Olympic and ISSF disciplines, as well as IPSC Practical disciplines and FITASC clay pigeon shooting.

Construction started on 31 March 2016. The 2017 IPSC Handgun World Shoot in August 2017 was the first major event to be held on the range. In 2018 the final parts of the shooting range were completed and inaugurated.

The centre was used as the shooting venue for the Paris 2024 Summer Olympics.

== See also ==
- French Shooting Federation
