= Josefin Eder =

German sport shooter (born 1995)

Personal information
- Nationality: German
- Born: 1 October 1995 (age 30) Müllrose, Germany
- Height: 1.70 m (5 ft 7 in)

Sport
- Country: Germany
- Sport: Shooting
- Events: 10 meter air pistol; 25 meter pistol
- Club: SV Hubertus Hüttengesäß
Medal record
Women's shooting
Representing Germany
European Games
Gold medal – first place	2023 Kraków–Małopolska	10 m air pistol team

Josefin Eder (born 1 October 1995) is a German sport shooter and World Champion.
