= Kim Ye-ji (sport shooter) =

South Korean Olympian (born 1992)

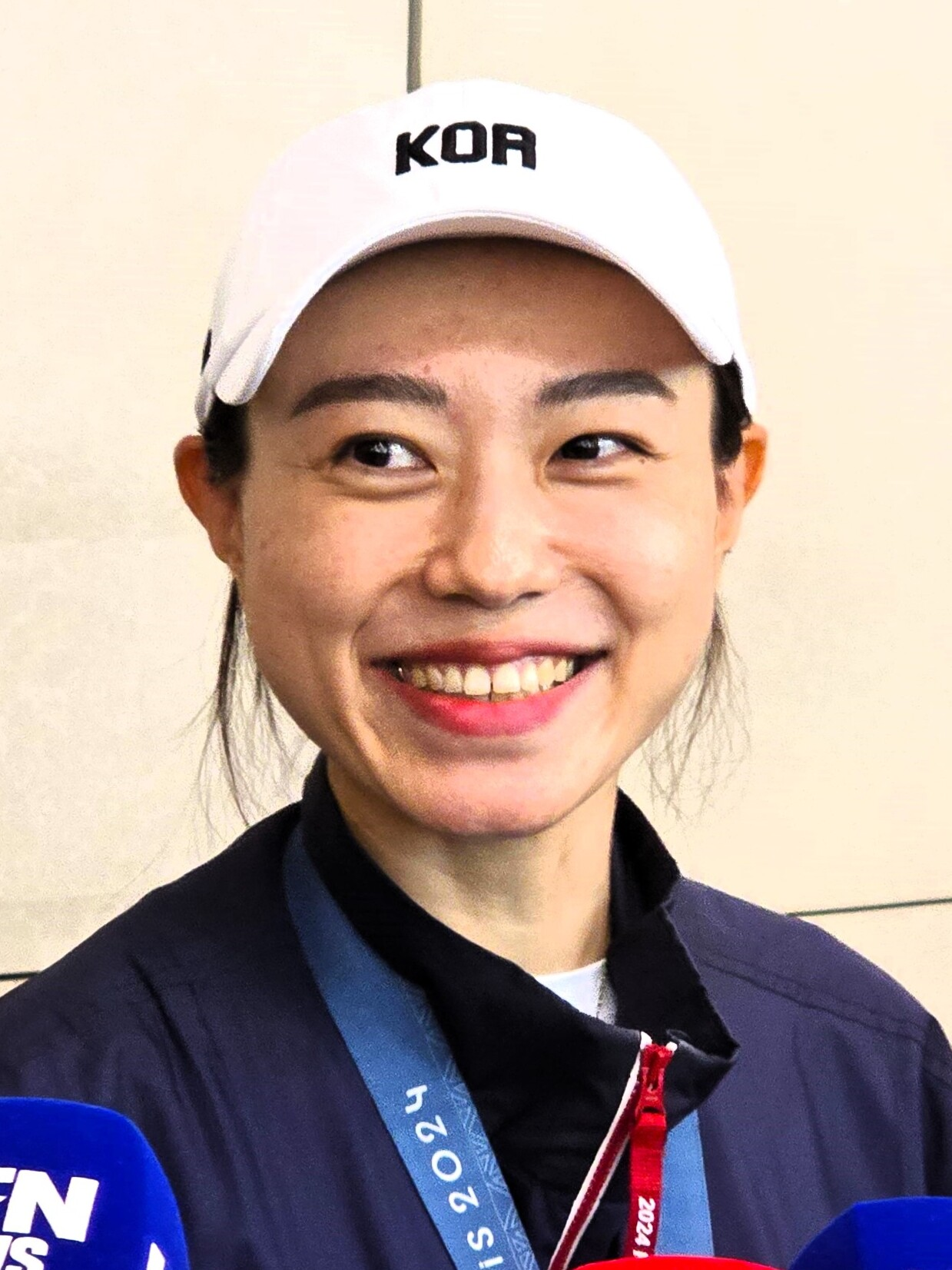
- Kim in August 2024

Personal information
- Born: 4 September 1992 (age 33) Danyang, South Korea

Sport
- Country: South Korea
- Sport: Sports shooting
Medal record
Women's shooting
Representing South Korea
Olympic Games
| Silver medal – second place | 2024 Paris | 10m air pistol |
World Cup
| Gold medal – first place | 2024 Baku | 25m pistol |
| Silver medal – second place | 2024 Baku | 10m air pistol |
| Bronze medal – third place | 2024 Munich | 25m pistol |
Asian Championships
| Silver medal – second place | 2024 Jakarta | 25m pistol |

Kim Ye-ji (Korean: 김예지; born 4 September 1992) is a South Korean pistol shooter. Born in Danyang, she started shooting in sixth grade after her gym teacher introduced her to the sport, and appeared at her first ISSF World Shooting Championships in 2010, where she won a bronze medal. Her performances at the 2024 ISSF World Cup and 2024 Summer Olympics, in which she set a world record in the 25 meter pistol women and won the silver medal in the women's 10 metre air pistol, prompted her to go viral online.

== Biography ==
Kim was born in Danyang, South Korea. She graduated from Danyang Middle School, Chungbuk Physical Education High School, and Kyongbuk Science College. She started shooting in sixth grade after her gym teacher, who was also the shooting team's coach, asked her class if anybody wanted to shoot a gun, and after she observed older students practising and thought them cool. Her parents initially refused to allow her to join the team, prompting her to refuse to eat for three days until they relented.

In 2010, Kim appeared at her first ISSF World Shooting Championships in Munich where she took the bronze in the junior category of the women's 10 meter air pistol. In 2024, she contested that year's Asian Shooting Championships, where she won a silver medal in the 25 meter pistol women. She then contested the 2024 ISSF World Cup, where she won a bronze in Munich in the 25 meter pistol women. In Baku, Kim won a silver in the 10 meter air pistol, before setting a world record in the women's 25 meter pistol event en route to taking gold, with a score of 42.

She contested the 2024 Summer Olympics later that year, where she finished with silver at that games' women's 10 meter air pistol behind her Korean compatriot Oh Ye-jin. She performed in a short ponytail and while clutching a small stuffed elephant. During the 2024 Summer Olympics, Kim went viral on social media for her charisma, with many social media commentators comparing her to the fictional characters James Bond and Satoru Gojo from the manga Jujutsu Kaisen. Early press suggested that her elephant was a gift from her daughter; in a subsequent interview with Los Angeles Times, she stated that the elephant was "actually a hand towel" given to her by her coach, on the grounds that competitors' "hands get greasy from loading cartridges" into their pistols.

Following her virality, a clip of her performance from the 2024 ISSF World Cup, in which she sported a backward cap, sharp bob, Terminator-style glasses, and an icy glare and told a reporter that she had "nothing to improve," also went viral. For this, some dubbed her the "coolest person on the planet," others complimented her "main character energy," and GQ described her as the games' first breakout star. She later stated that her cap was to keep her hair out of her face and that she wore it forwards when light was in her eyes. On 30 August, W Korea and Louis Vuitton published a series of photographs and videos with Kim as the model. In September, she was cast in the role of an assassin in TV series Crush. In October, she became the Tesla Korea brand ambassador. In November, she announced a break from competitive shooting to spend more time with her family.

== See also ==
- Yusuf Dikeç, Turkish sport shooter
- Oh Ye-jin, Korean air pistol shooter
- Choe Dae-han, Korean air rifle shooter
