= Anna Korakaki =

Greek sport shooter (born 1996)

Personal information
- Nationality: Greek
- Born: 8 April 1996 (age 30) Drama, Greece
- Height: 1.74 m (5 ft 9 in)
- Weight: 64 kg (141 lb)

Sport
- Country: Greece
- Sport: Shooting
- Event: Air pistol
Medal record
Women's shooting
Representing Greece
Olympic Games
| Gold medal – first place | 2016 Rio de Janeiro | 25m pistol |
| Bronze medal – third place | 2016 Rio de Janeiro | 10m air pistol |
World Championships
| Gold medal – first place | 2018 Changwon | 10m air pistol |
| Silver medal – second place | 2022 Cairo | 10m air pistol |
| Silver medal – second place | 2023 Baku | 10m air pistol |
| Silver medal – second place | 2023 Baku | 25m standard pistol |
European Games
| Gold medal – first place | 2023 Kraków-Małopolska | 25 m pistol |
| Gold medal – first place | 2019 Minsk | 25 m pistol |
| Silver medal – second place | 2015 Baku | 10 m air pistol mixed team |
| Silver medal – second place | 2019 Minsk | 10 m air pistol |
European Championships
| Silver medal – second place | 2019 Osijek | 10m air pistol |
| Bronze medal – third place | 2020 Wrocław | 10m air pistol |
| Gold medal – first place | 2023 Tallinn | 10m air pistol |
Mediterranean Games
| Gold medal – first place | 2018 Tarragona | 10m air pistol |
| Gold medal – first place | 2022 Oran | 10m air pistol |

Anna Korakaki (Greek: Άννα Κορακάκη; born 8 April 1996) is a Greek Olympic shooter.

== Career ==
She represented Greece at the 2016 Summer Olympics, winning a gold medal in the 25m pistol shot event and a bronze medal in the 10m air pistol shooting event. The Gold medal she won for Greece was following a hiatus since the last Gold medal won for Greece, at the 2004 Summer Olympics. Her Olympic distinctions include: she was the first Greek woman in her maiden appearance at an Olympics (then aged 20 years) to be a multi-Olympic medalist for Greece at the same Olympiad, a feat last achieved by a Greek Olympic athlete at the 1912 Summer Olympics with Konstantinos Tsiklitiras. In the 25m fire pistol event, Korakaki of Greece and Monika Karsch of Germany would vie for gold medalist, each holding a tie or the lead with each succeeding round, and Korakaki would defeat Karsch after She won three rounds thus getting a lead of 6–0, then the Germany rival won the next three rounds and thus bringing it to a 6–6 tie. In the last round, Germany missed the first and third shots of their five shots, and Korakaki had missed her fourth shot, but she hit her fifth shot and won 8–6, taking the gold and avoiding a tie.

Korakaki has competed since 2009. She is with the Orion Shooting Club of Thessaloniki and she is coached by her father and retired shooter Tassos Korakakis. She is an undergraduate student in Special Education at the University of Macedonia in Thessaloniki.

On 12 March 2020, she became the first woman to be the originating Olympic athlete torchbearer of an Olympic torch relay.

She was designated by Greek Olympic Committee as the flag bearer for the Tokyo 2020 Olympic Games, along with the Greek artistic gymnast Eleftherios Petrounias. In her participation at Olympics, she placed sixth both in the 10m air pistol and in the 25m pistol. After the completion of the competitions, she revealed that her performance had been affected due to the stalking she had suffered for a long time from an individual, who was eventually sentenced to five years in prison.

At Paris 2024 Olympic Games she placed 44th in women's 10-meter air pistol and 34th in women's 25-meter air pistol.

She was named the Greek Female Athlete of the Year for the years 2016 and 2018.

== International results ==
Korakaki has been a member of the Greece national shooting team since 2010. Distinguished results include:

- Gold and Bronze medalist at the 2016 Summer Olympics in Rio de Janeiro.
- Gold medal (10 m air pistol) and 9th place (25 m air pistol) at the 2018 World Championships in Changwon.
- Gold and two times bronze medalist at the 2018 World Cup in Fort Benning.
- Gold medalist at the 2018 World Cup Final in Guadalajara.
- Gold and silver medalist at the 2016 World Cup in Bologna. In the 25m pistol, she won a gold medal with an overall score of 39/50, beating South Korean Jangami Kim and Ukrainian Olena Kostevich who respectively won the Silver and bronze medals.
- Gold and silver medalist at the 2019 European Games in Minsk.
- Gold and bronze medalist at the 2017 World Cup Final in Munich.
- Gold and silver medalist at the 2016 Junior World Cup in Suhl.
- Gold medalist at the 2023 European Championship in Tallinn.
- Gold medalist at the 2014 European Junior Championship in Moscow.
- Gold medalist at the 2023 World Cup in Baku.
- Gold medalist (10 m) at the 2024 World Cup in Cairo.
- Two time silver medalist at the 2016 World Cup in Baku.
- Silver medalist (25 m.) at the 2024 World Cup in Cairo.
- Silver medalist at the 2015 European Games in Baku.
- Silver medalist at the 2015 World Cup Final in Munich.
- Silver medalist at the 2011 European Junior Championship in Belgrade.
- Bronze medalist at the 2015 World Cup in Fort Benning.
- Bronze medalist at the 2014 World Junior Championship in Granada.

== Records ==
Current world records held in 10 meter air pistol
| Women | Qualification | 591 | Jiang Ranxin (CHN) | Oct 15, 2022 | Cairo (EGY) |

== Personal life ==
After the Olympics, Anna Korakaki got a tattoo of the Olympic rings and the year on her right hand to remember her Rio achievements.
