= Rhythm Sangwan =

Indian sport shooter

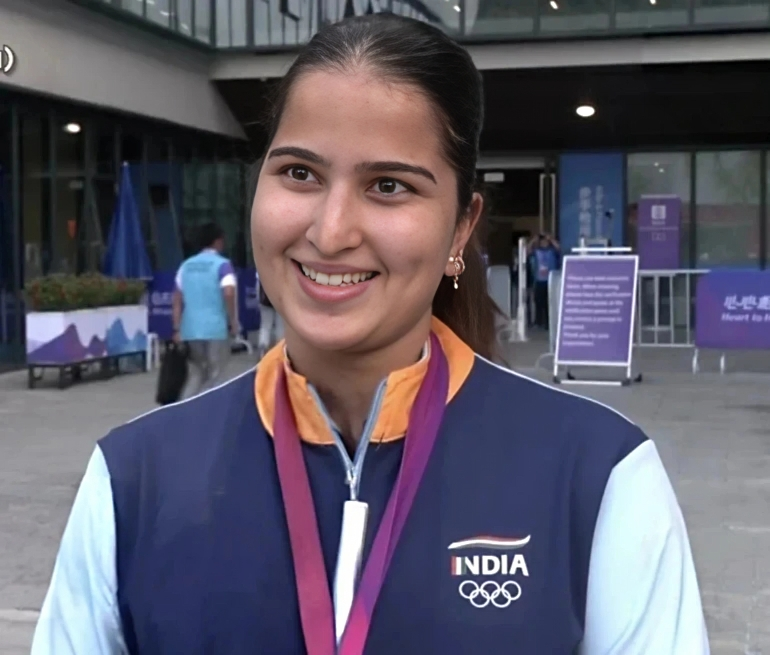

Personal information
- National team: India
- Born: 29 November 2003 (age 22)
- Education: Delhi Public School
- Years active: 2021-
- Height: 1.71 m (5 ft 7 in)

Sport
- Country: India
- Sport: Shooting
- Events: 10 meter air pistol, 25 meter pistol and 25 meter rapid fire pistol

Achievements and titles
- Personal best: 25 m pistol: 595 WR WJR (2023)
Medal record
Women's shooting
Representing India
Event	1st	2nd	3rd
ISSF World Championships	1	3	0
ISSF Junior World Championships	3	2	-
ISSF World Cup	3	1	1
ISSF Junior World Cup	2	-	-
Total	9	6	1
World Championships
Gold medal – first place	2023 Baku	25 m pistol team
Silver medal – second place	2022 Cairo	25 m standard pistol
Silver medal – second place	2022 Cairo	10 m air pistol team
Silver medal – second place	2022 Cairo	25 m pistol team
Asian Championships
Gold medal – first place	2026 New Delhi	25 m air pistol Team
Silver medal – second place	2023 Changwon	25 m pistol team
Asian Airgun Championships
Gold medal – first place	2022 Daegu	10 m air pistol
Gold medal – first place	2022 Daegu	10 m air pistol mixed team
Silver medal – second place	2022 Daegu	10 m air pistol team

Rhythm Sangwan (born 29 November 2003) is an Indian sport shooter who usually competes in 10 meter air pistol and 25 meter pistol. She has won medals in Shooting World Cups and Shooting Championship at junior as well as at senior level.

She won the gold as part of India team in the women's 25m pistol team event at the Asian Games along with Manu Bhaker and Esha Singh.

== Early life ==
Rhythm's father Narender Kumar, who works in the police department and her mother Neelam encouraged her to take up the sport. At the age of 12 years, Rhythm first visited the Dr Karni Singh Shooting Range in New Delhi and started her practice. She initially trained under Vinit Kumar and her mother used to accompany her to the sessions. She studied at the Delhi Public School in Faridabad.

== Career ==
=== International ===
In January 2024, Sangwan took part in the Asian Qualifiers at Jakarta and won a bronze medal in the 25m sports pistol to book a berth for the 2024 Paris Olympic Games. It was the 16th quota place for the Indian shooters.

In 2023, she took part in the Bhopal World Cup at the Madhya Pradesh State Shooting Academy.

In May 2023, she broke the 29-year-old record set by Diana Iorgova, the 1996 Atlanta Olympic Games silver medallist. Rhythm shot 595 in women's 25m pistol qualification round at the ISSF World Cup in Baku. Diana had shot 594 in Milan World Cup in May 1994. She also won the 10m Air Pistol bronze for India.

=== Domestic ===
In her first National event at the 61st National Shooting Championship in Thiruvananthapuram, Rhythm bagged three gold medals.

== Awards ==
Best Young Achiever (Girl) at the Sportstar Aces Awards 2023.
