= Shooting at the 2018 Asian Games =

- Venue: Jakabaring Shooting Range
- Dates: 19–26 August 2018
- Competitors: 390 from 33 nations

Shooting at the 2018 Asian Games was held at the Jakabaring Shooting Range, Palembang, Indonesia. It was held from 19 to 26 August 2018.

Dispatched the highest number of athletes, China won the most medals with 15, as well as most gold and silver medals. South Korea won the most bronze medals. Hosts Indonesia, despite playing with the second-highest number of athletes, failed to win any gold or bronze; they won only one silver medal.

== Schedule ==
Q	Qualification	F	Final

Event↓/Date →	19th Sun		20th Mon		21st Tue		22nd Wed		23rd Thu		24th Fri		25th Sat		26th Sun	
Men's 10 m air pistol					Q	F										
Men's 25 m rapid fire pistol											Q		Q	F		
Men's 10 m air rifle			Q	F												
Men's 50 m rifle 3 positions					Q	F										
Men's 300 m standard rifle											F					
Men's 10 m running target									Q		Q	F				
Men's 10 m running target mixed													F			
Men's trap	Q		Q	F												
Men's double trap									Q	F						
Men's skeet													Q		Q	F
Women's 10 m air pistol											Q	F				
Women's 25 m pistol							Q	F								
Women's 10 m air rifle			Q	F												
Women's 50 m rifle 3 positions							Q	F								
Women's trap	Q		Q	F												
Women's double trap									F							
Women's skeet													Q		Q	F
Mixed 10 m air pistol team	Q	F														
Mixed 10 m air rifle team	Q	F														
Mixed trap team					Q	F										

== Medalists ==
=== Men ===
Event	Gold	Silver	Bronze
10 m air pistol	Saurabh Chaudhary; India	Tomoyuki Matsuda; Japan	Abhishek Verma; India
25 m rapid fire pistol	Yao Zhaonan; China	Lin Junmin; China	Kim Jun-hong; South Korea
10 m air rifle	Yang Haoran; China	Deepak Kumar; India	Lu Shao-chuan; Chinese Taipei
50 m rifle 3 positions	Hui Zicheng; China	Sanjeev Rajput; India	Takayuki Matsumoto; Japan
300 m standard rifle	Choi Young-jeon; South Korea	Hussain Al-Harbi; Saudi Arabia	Lee Won-gyu; South Korea
10 m running target	Jeong You-jin; South Korea	Pak Myong-won; North Korea	Ngô Hữu Vượng; Vietnam
10 m running target mixed	Pak Myong-won; North Korea	Muhammad Sejahtera Dwi Putra; Indonesia	Gan Yu; China
Trap	Yang Kun-pi; Chinese Taipei	Lakshay Sheoran; India	Ahn Dae-myeong; South Korea
Double trap	Shin Hyun-woo; South Korea	Shardul Vihan; India	Hamad Al-Marri; Qatar
Skeet	Mansour Al-Rashidi; Kuwait	Jin Di; China	Saif Bin Futtais; United Arab Emirates

=== Women ===
Event	Gold	Silver	Bronze
10 m air pistol	Wang Qian; China	Kim Min-jung; South Korea	Heena Sidhu; India
25 m pistol	Rahi Sarnobat; India	Naphaswan Yangpaiboon; Thailand	Kim Min-jung; South Korea
10 m air rifle	Zhao Ruozhu; China	Jung Eun-hea; South Korea	Gankhuyagiin Nandinzayaa; Mongolia
50 m rifle 3 positions	Gankhuyagiin Nandinzayaa; Mongolia	Chuluunbadrakhyn Narantuyaa; Mongolia	Mahlagha Jambozorg; Iran
Trap	Zhang Xinqiu; China	Kang Gee-eun; South Korea	Ray Bassil; Lebanon
Double trap	Li Qingnian; China	Bai Yiting; China	Mariya Dmitriyenko; Kazakhstan
Skeet	Sutiya Jiewchaloemmit; Thailand	Wei Meng; China	Kim Min-ji; South Korea

=== Mixed ===
Event	Gold	Silver	Bronze
10 m air pistol team	China; Wu Jiayu; Ji Xiaojing	South Korea; Lee Dae-myung; Kim Min-jung	Vietnam; Trần Quốc Cường; Lê Thị Linh Chi
10 m air rifle team	Chinese Taipei; Lu Shao-chuan; Lin Ying-shin	China; Yang Haoran; Zhao Ruozhu	India; Ravi Kumar; Apurvi Chandela
Trap team	Lebanon; Alain Moussa; Ray Bassil	Chinese Taipei; Yang Kun-pi; Lin Yi-chun	China; Du Yu; Wang Xiaojing

== Medal table ==
Rank	Nation	Gold	Silver	Bronze	Total
1	China (CHN)	8	5	2	15
2	South Korea (KOR)	3	4	5	12
3	India (IND)	2	4	3	9
4	Chinese Taipei (TPE)	2	1	1	4
5	Mongolia (MGL)	1	1	1	3
6	North Korea (PRK)	1	1	0	2
6	Thailand (THA)	1	1	0	2
8	Lebanon (LBN)	1	0	1	2
9	Kuwait (KUW)	1	0	0	1
10	Japan (JPN)	0	1	1	2
11	Indonesia (INA)	0	1	0	1
11	Saudi Arabia (KSA)	0	1	0	1
13	Vietnam (VIE)	0	0	2	2
14	Iran (IRI)	0	0	1	1
14	Kazakhstan (KAZ)	0	0	1	1
14	Qatar (QAT)	0	0	1	1
14	United Arab Emirates (UAE)	0	0	1	1
Totals (17 entries)		20	20	20	60

== Participating nations ==
A total of 390 athletes from 33 nations competed in shooting at the 2018 Asian Games:

- Bahrain (7)
- Bangladesh (16)
- China (30)
- Chinese Taipei (13)
- Hong Kong (4)
- India (28)
- Indonesia (28)
- Iran (19)
- Japan (18)
- Kazakhstan (21)
- Kuwait (10)
- Kyrgyzstan (4)
- Laos (3)
- Lebanon (3)
- Malaysia (8)
- Maldives (5)
- Mongolia (9)
- Myanmar (4)
- Nepal (3)
- North Korea (9)
- Oman (10)
- Pakistan (10)
- Philippines (4)
- Qatar (20)
- Saudi Arabia (6)
- Singapore (9)
- South Korea (28)
- Tajikistan (4)
- Thailand (21)
- Timor-Leste (2)
- United Arab Emirates (14)
- Uzbekistan (4)
- Vietnam (16)
