= Shooting at the 2018 Asian Games – Women's 10 metre air rifle =

Women's 10 metre air rifle at the 2018 Asian Games
- Venue: Jakabaring Shooting Range
- Dates: 20 August 2018
- Competitors: 48 from 27 nations

Medalists
gold medal	Zhao Ruozhu	China
silver medal	Jung Eun-hea	South Korea
bronze medal	Gankhuyagiin Nandinzayaa	Mongolia

The women's 10 metre air rifle event at the 2018 Asian Games in Palembang, Indonesia took place on 20 August at the Jakabaring International Shooting Range.

== Schedule ==
All times are Western Indonesia Time (UTC+07:00)

Date	Time	Event
Monday, 20 August 2018	10:30	Qualification
Monday, 20 August 2018	12:30	Final

== Records ==
Prior to this competition, the existing world, Asian and Games records were as follows.

Qualification
World Record	Zhu Yingjie (CHN)	633.4	Fort Benning, United States	9 May 2018
Asian Record	Zhu Yingjie (CHN)	633.4	Fort Benning, United States	9 May 2018
Games Record	—	—	—	—
Final
World Record	Zhao Ruozhu (CHN)	252.4	Changwon, South Korea	22 April 2018
Asian Record	Zhao Ruozhu (CHN)	252.4	Changwon, South Korea	22 April 2018
Games Record	—	—	—	—

== Results ==
Legend

- DNS — Did not start

=== Qualification ===
Rank	Athlete	Series						Total	Notes
Rank	Athlete	1	2	3	4	5	6	Total	Notes
1	Zhao Ruozhu (CHN)	104.4	104.9	106.0	105.3	105.9	105.4	631.9	GR
2	Apurvi Chandela (IND)	106.3	103.4	103.4	105.2	105.3	105.8	629.4	
3	Jung Eun-hea (KOR)	103.8	105.4	104.5	104.1	104.8	104.4	627.0	
4	Gankhuyagiin Nandinzayaa (MGL)	104.2	105.0	104.5	105.3	104.0	103.6	626.6	
5	Elaheh Ahmadi (IRI)	102.9	104.6	106.1	105.3	103.4	103.9	626.2	
6	Armina Sadeghian (IRI)	102.8	104.7	103.5	104.5	105.3	103.9	624.7	
7	Martina Veloso (SGP)	104.2	103.3	104.6	104.5	103.8	103.9	624.3	
8	Lin Ying-shin (TPE)	103.6	104.6	104.0	104.4	103.6	103.8	624.0	
9	Keum Ji-hyeon (KOR)	105.3	103.2	103.4	104.9	102.7	103.5	623.0	
10	Nur Izazi Rosli (MAS)	102.3	104.0	103.2	103.9	104.8	104.1	622.3	
11	Wu Mingyang (CHN)	104.3	104.4	102.3	102.6	104.6	103.2	621.4	
12	Fidela Puspa Dewi (INA)	103.4	103.2	102.2	103.3	105.6	103.5	621.2	
13	Jasmine Ser (SGP)	104.1	103.7	103.4	102.6	102.9	104.2	620.9	
14	Elavenil Valarivan (IND)	104.3	103.2	102.5	102.5	104.6	103.7	620.8	
15	Monica Daryanti (INA)	102.7	103.4	102.8	104.0	103.4	103.9	620.2	
16	Ayano Shimizu (JPN)	103.4	103.2	103.6	102.0	104.1	103.8	620.1	
17	Sakina Mamedova (UZB)	103.8	103.0	102.9	104.0	104.4	101.6	619.7	
18	Chen Yun-yun (TPE)	104.3	103.5	101.5	103.0	102.2	105.0	619.5	
19	Chuluunbadrakhyn Narantuyaa (MGL)	103.3	103.1	102.4	101.5	104.4	104.6	619.3	
20	Violetta Starostina (KAZ)	103.8	102.5	103.3	102.8	103.3	103.4	619.1	
21	Nguyễn Huyền Trang (VIE)	101.6	103.1	103.2	103.3	103.2	103.0	617.4	
22	Alexandra Malinovskaya (KAZ)	101.3	103.9	101.6	104.5	101.8	103.5	616.6	
23	Tararat Morakot (THA)	101.9	100.2	103.4	102.6	102.7	102.7	613.5	
24	Ai Iwaki (VIE)	104.2	100.6	101.8	101.3	101.8	103.3	613.0	
25	Ummey Zakia Sultana (BAN)	101.8	101.2	102.7	104.2	102.8	99.9	612.6	
26	Anastasiia Shchukovskaia (KGZ)	100.3	103.4	100.5	103.0	102.5	102.5	612.2	
27	Malika Lagutenko (TJK)	101.8	99.0	103.1	103.8	102.2	102.3	612.2	
28	Safa Al-Doseri (BRN)	100.5	101.7	101.8	104.2	100.7	101.8	610.7	
29	Thanyalak Chotphibunsin (THA)	99.4	102.0	102.7	103.0	101.8	101.7	610.6	
30	Amina Al-Tarshi (OMA)	99.7	102.8	102.3	99.6	103.2	102.9	610.5	
31	Hanan Rahma (BRN)	100.0	101.3	101.9	103.5	102.2	101.4	610.3	
32	Zaynab Pardabaeva (UZB)	101.0	102.3	100.4	101.8	103.2	101.3	610.0	
33	Siham Al-Hasani (OMA)	102.5	101.3	102.5	101.1	102.7	99.9	610.0	
34	Sharmin Ratna (BAN)	101.6	100.6	101.5	102.3	100.2	103.5	609.7	
35	Maki Konomoto (JPN)	101.9	100.6	104.1	102.3	101.0	99.4	609.3	
36	Ri Un-gyong (PRK)	102.7	99.8	101.2	101.9	101.6	99.9	607.1	
37	Nadira Raees (PAK)	102.0	102.6	99.1	103.6	100.3	99.4	607.0	
38	Minhal Sohail (PAK)	101.5	97.7	103.7	98.5	99.8	104.0	605.2	
39	Aye Myat Yadanar Oo (MYA)	99.9	100.9	101.4	99.0	101.8	101.6	604.6	
40	Amparo Acuña (PHI)	102.4	100.5	99.9	99.6	101.8	99.5	603.7	
41	Matara Al-Aseiri (QAT)	100.1	101.9	99.5	99.2	98.9	99.8	599.4	
42	Latifa Al-Maazmi (UAE)	100.1	98.8	99.5	100.6	100.5	98.8	598.3	
43	Tumar Kasmalieva (KGZ)	97.9	100.0	98.2	100.9	100.8	98.9	596.7	
44	Marwa Jawhar Mahboob (UAE)	95.9	99.5	99.3	100.6	99.7	100.8	595.8	
45	Kalpana Pariyar (NEP)	98.1	98.3	99.0	100.9	98.4	100.1	594.8	
46	Sushmita Nepal (NEP)	96.3	95.5	98.4	97.5	98.6	100.8	587.1	
—	Haya Al-Boloushi (QAT)							DNS	
—	Cristina Ximenes (TLS)							DNS	

=== Final ===
Rank	Athlete	1st stage		2nd stage – Elimination							S-off	Notes
Rank	Athlete	1	2	1	2	3	4	5	6	7	S-off	Notes
1st place, gold medalist(s)	Zhao Ruozhu (CHN)	52.0	103.5	125.1	146.0	166.8	188.1	208.8	229.8	250.9		GR
2nd place, silver medalist(s)	Jung Eun-hea (KOR)	51.6	102.9	123.6	144.3	165.3	186.6	206.7	227.4	248.6		
3rd place, bronze medalist(s)	Gankhuyagiin Nandinzayaa (MGL)	51.8	102.8	123.8	145.0	165.5	186.3	207.0	227.4		SO	
4	Armina Sadeghian (IRI)	52.9	103.3	124.6	146.1	166.5	186.5	206.3				
5	Apurvi Chandela (IND)	51.2	103.1	124.0	144.7	165.4	186.0					
6	Martina Veloso (SGP)	50.1	102.4	122.6	143.5	164.0						
7	Elaheh Ahmadi (IRI)	49.5	100.2	121.4	141.8							
8	Lin Ying-shin (TPE)	50.5	100.6	121.2								
