= 2019 Asian Airgun Championships =

- Host city: Taoyuan, Taiwan
- Dates: 25 March – 2 April 2019
- Main venue: Gongxi Shooting Range

The 2019 Asian Airgun Championships were held at Gongxi Shooting Range, Taoyuan, Taiwan between 25 March and 2 April 2019.

== Medal summary ==
=== Men ===
Event	Gold	Silver	Bronze
10 m air pistol	Kim Mo-se; South Korea	Abhishek Verma; India	Lee Tae-hwan; South Korea
10 m air pistol team	India; Saurabh Chaudhary; Ravinder Singh; Abhishek Verma	South Korea; Kang Kyung-tak; Kim Mo-se; Lee Tae-hwan	Chinese Taipei; Kuo Kuan-ting; Li You-cheng; Wu Kuo-yang
10 m air rifle	Divyansh Singh Panwar; India	Kim Da-jin; South Korea	Shin Min-ki; South Korea
10 m air rifle team	India; Deepak Kumar; Ravi Kumar; Divyansh Singh Panwar	South Korea; Jeon Je-yul; Kim Da-jin; Shin Min-ki	Chinese Taipei; Chen Chih-chien; Chen Chun-an; Lu Shao-chuan

=== Women ===
Event	Gold	Silver	Bronze
10 m air pistol	Manu Bhaker; India	Shing Ho Ching; Hong Kong	Wafa Al-Ali; United Arab Emirates
10 m air pistol team	South Korea; Hwang Seong-eun; Kang Min-jeong; Kim Byung-hee	Chinese Taipei; Tu Yi Yi-tzu; Wu Chia-ying; Yu Ai-wen	India; Anuradha; Manu Bhaker; Shri Nivetha Paramanantham
10 m air rifle	Elavenil Valarivan; India	Lin Ying-shin; Chinese Taipei	Park Sun-min; South Korea
10 m air rifle team	India; Apurvi Chandela; Meghana Sajjanar; Elavenil Valarivan	Chinese Taipei; Chen Yun-yun; Lin Ying-shin; Tsai Yi-ting	South Korea; Go Do-won; Jeon Myeong-jin; Park Sun-min

=== Mixed ===
Event	Gold	Silver	Bronze
10 m air pistol team	India; Saurabh Chaudhary; Manu Bhaker	South Korea; Kim Mo-se; Hwang Seong-eun	Chinese Taipei; Kuo Kuan-ting; Wu Chia-ying
10 m air rifle team	South Korea; Shin Min-ki; Park Sun-min	India; Ravi Kumar; Elavenil Valarivan	Chinese Taipei; Lu Shao-chuan; Tsai Yi-ting

== Medal table ==
Rank	Nation	Gold	Silver	Bronze	Total
1	India	7	2	1	10
2	South Korea	3	4	4	11
3	Chinese Taipei	0	3	4	7
4	Hong Kong	0	1	0	1
5	United Arab Emirates	0	0	1	1
Totals (5 entries)		10	10	10	30

== See also ==
- List of sporting events in Taiwan
