= Pakistan at the 2018 Asian Games =

- IOC code: PAK
- NOC: Pakistan Olympic Association
- Website: www.nocpakistan.org

in Jakarta and Palembang August 18 – September 2
- Competitors: 256 in 35 sports
- Flag bearer: Muhammad Rizwan Sr.
- Officials: 96
- Medals Ranked 34th: Gold 0 Silver 0 Bronze 4 Total 4

Asian Games appearances (overview)
- 1954; 1958; 1962; 1966; 1970; 1974; 1978; 1982; 1986; 1990; 1994; 1998; 2002; 2006; 2010; 2014; 2018; 2022; 2026

Pakistan competed at the 2018 Asian Games in Jakarta and Palembang, Indonesia, from 18 August to 2 September 2018. The Pakistani contingent in the Games comprised 256 competitors.

== Medallist ==
The following Pakistan competitors won medals at the Games.

Medal	Name	Sport	Event	Date
Bronze	Nasir Ali; Wasim Sajjad; Muhammad Nadeem; Muhammad Rizwan; Abid Hussain; Waqar Ali; Tahseen Ullah; Usman Zada; Mudassar Ali; Kashif Razzaq; Muhammad Imran; Hassan Raza	Kabaddi	Men's tournament	23 Aug
Bronze	Nargis	Karate	Women's +68 kg	25 Aug
Bronze	Arshad Nadeem	Athletics	Men's javelin throw	27 Aug
Bronze	Muhammad Asim Khan; Tayyab Aslam; Amaad Fareed; Israr Ahmad	Squash	Men's team	31 Aug

Medals by sport
Sport	1st place, gold medalist(s)	2nd place, silver medalist(s)	3rd place, bronze medalist(s)	Total
Athletics	0	0	1	1
Kabaddi	0	0	1	1
Karate	0	0	1	1
Squash	0	0	1	1
Total	0	0	4	4

Medals by gender
Gender	1st place, gold medalist(s)	2nd place, silver medalist(s)	3rd place, bronze medalist(s)	Total
Female	0	0	1	1
Male	0	0	3	3
Mixed	0	0	0	0
Total	0	0	4	4

Medals by day
Day	Date	1st place, gold medalist(s)	2nd place, silver medalist(s)	3rd place, bronze medalist(s)	Total
1	August 19	0	0	0	0
2	August 20	0	0	0	0
3	August 21	0	0	0	0
4	August 22	0	0	0	0
5	August 23	0	0	1	1
6	August 24	0	0	0	0
7	August 25	0	0	1	1
8	August 26	0	0	0	0
9	August 27	0	0	1	1
10	August 28	0	0	0	0
11	August 29	0	0	0	0
12	August 30	0	0	0	0
13	August 31	0	0	1	1
14	September 1	0	0	0	0
15	September 2	0	0	0	0
Total		0	0	4	4

== Competitors ==
Pakistan originally planned to send 397 athletes and officials in 36 sports to the Games. However, due to financial constraints, the contingent was reduced, with 256 athletes and 96 officials in 35 sports sent. The following list shows the number of competitors per sport:

Sport	Men	Women	Total
Archery	1	1	2
Athletics	10	2	12
Badminton	4	4	8
Baseball	16	—	16
Boxing	6	2	8
Bridge	9	2	11
Fencing	4	0	4
Field hockey	18	0	18
Football	20	0	20
Golf	2	0	2
Gymnastics	1	0	1
Handball	12	0	12
Ju-jitsu	4	0	4
Judo	2	0	2
Kabaddi	12	0	12
Karate	3	3	6
Kurash	4	0	4
Paragliding	1	0	1
Pencak silat	5	0	5
Rowing	2	1	3
Rugby sevens	12	0	12
Sailing	5	0	5
Sepak takraw	6	0	6
Shooting	8	2	10
Soft tennis	5	3	8
Sport climbing	2	0	2
Squash	4	4	8
Swimming	4	3	7
Table tennis	2	2	4
Taekwondo	3	3	6
Tennis	4	4	8
Volleyball	12	0	12
Weightlifting	4	0	4
Wrestling	4	0	4
Wushu	6	3	9
Total	217	39	256

Demonstration events

Sport	Men	Women	Total
eSports	6	0	6

== Archery ==
Pakistan Archery Federation (PAF) have prepared 10 athletes to compete at the Games. On 12 July 2018, PAF was named six athletes with 3 men's and 3 women's, but on Friday, 27 July 2018, PAF announced 2 athletes (1 men and 1 women) to compete at the Games after the cut on players made by Pakistan Sports Board.

Recurve

Athlete	Event	Ranking Round		Round of 64	Round of 32	Round of 16	Quarterfinals	Semifinals	Final/Bronze Medal	
Athlete	Event	Score	Seed	Opposition score	Opposition score	Opposition score	Opposition score	Opposition score	Opposition score	Rank
Idrees Majid	Men's Individual	558	78	Agatha (INA); L 0–6	Did not Advance					
Nabeela Kousar	Women's Individual	466	66	Nemati (IRI); L 0–6	Did not Advance					
Idrees Majid; Nabeela Kousar	Mixed team	1024	23	—N/a	North Korea; L 0–6	Did not Advance				

== Athletics ==
Pakistan entered twelve athletes (10 men's and 2 women's) to participate in the athletics competition at the Games.

Men

Track events

Athletes	Event	Heats		Semifinal		Final	
Athletes	Event	Result	Rank	Result	Rank	Result	Rank
Gohar Shahbaz	100 m	10.66	6 q	10.80	8	Did not Advance	
Liaquat Ali	100 m	11.01	5	Did not Advance			
Muhammad Nadeem	200 m	21.70	7	Did not Advance			
Muhammad Shahbaz	200 m	21.91	6	Did not Advance			
Uzair Rehman	400 m	49.19	3 Q	48.97	7	Did not Advance	
Nokar Hussain	400 m	49.75	5 q	DNS		Did not Advance	
Mehboob Ali	400 m hurdles	51.27	4	—N/a		Did not Advance	
Muhammad Shahbaz; Liaquat Ali; Uzair Rehman; Gohar Shahbaz	4 × 100 m relay	40.56	6	—N/a		Did not Advance	
Umar Sadat; Mazhar Ali; Muhammad Nadeem; Mehboob Ali	4 × 400 m relay	3:08.20	6 q	—N/a		3:08.87	8

Field events

Athletes	Event	Final	
Athletes	Event	Result	Rank
Arshad Nadeem	Javelin throw	80.75 NR PB	3rd place, bronze medalist(s)

Women

Track events

Athletes	Event	Heats		Final	
Athletes	Event	Result	Rank	Result	Rank
Rabia Ashiq	800 m	2:22.56	5	Did not Advance	
Maria Maratab	100 m hurdles	15.72	5	Did not Advance	

Field events

Athletes	Event	Final	
Athletes	Event	Result	Rank
Maria Maratab	Triple jump	DNS	

== Badminton ==
Pakistan Badminton Federation announced its squad of eight athletes (4 men's and 4 women's).

Men

Athlete	Event	Round of 64	Round of 32	Round of 16	Quarterfinals	Semifinals	Final	
Athlete	Event	Opposition score	Opposition score	Opposition score	Opposition score	Opposition score	Opposition score	Rank
Azeem Sarwar	Singles	Bye	Lee Z J (MAS); L (13–21, 10–21)	Did not Advance				
Muhammad Irfan Saeed Bhatti	Singles	Bye	Chen L (CHN); L (8–21, 10–21)	Did not Advance				
Rizwan Azam; Sulehri Kashif Ali	Doubles	—N/a	D Dhami / R Tamang (NEP); W (21–19, 22–20)	S Dias / B Goonethilleka (SRI); L (12–21, 13–21)	Did not Advance			
Azeem Sarwar; Muhammad Irfan Saeed Bhatti	Doubles	—N/a	T Inoue / Y Kaneko (JPN); L (8–21, 16–21)	Did not Advance				
Azeem Sarwar; Kashif Ali Sulehri; Muhammad Irfan Saeed Bhatti; Rizwan Azam	Team	—N/a		Nepal; L 1–3	Did not Advance			

Women

Athlete	Event	Round of 32	Round of 16	Quarterfinals	Semifinals	Final	
Athlete	Event	Opposition score	Opposition score	Opposition score	Opposition score	Opposition score	Rank
Mahoor Shahzad	Singles	Sung J-h (KOR); L (9–21, 10–21)	Did not Advance				
Sehra Akram	Singles	Yip P Y (HKG); L (7–21, 2–21)	Did not Advance				
Sehra Akram; Mahoor Shahzad	Doubles	Lee S-h / Shin S-c (KOR); L (3–21, 6–21)	Did not Advance				
Ghazala Siddique; Saima Waqas	Doubles	N Najeed / M A Shahurunaz (MDV); W (22–20, 18–21, 21–15)	M Matsutomo / A Takahashi (JPN); L (3–21, 3–21)	Did not Advance			
Sehra Akram; Mahoor Shahzad; Ghazala Siddique; Saima Waqas	Team	—N/a	Chinese Taipei; L 0–3	Did not Advance			

Mixed

Athlete	Event	Round of 32	Round of 16	Quarterfinals	Semifinals	Final	
Athlete	Event	Opposition score	Opposition score	Opposition score	Opposition score	Opposition score	Rank
Rizwan Azam; Saima Waqas	Mixed	Bye	Y Watanabe / A Higashino (JPN); L (7–21, 9–21)	Did not Advance			

== Baseball ==
Pakistan men's team were drawn in group B at the Games.

Team	Event	Round 1			Round 2				Super / Consolation			Final / BM	
Team	Event	Oppositions score	Oppositions score	Rank	Oppositions score	Oppositions score	Oppositions score	Rank	Oppositions score	Oppositions score	Rank	Opposition score	Rank
Pakistan men's	Men's tournament	Bye			Japan; L 0–15 (F/6)	Thailand; W 8–1	China; L 3–16 (F/7)	3	Indonesia; W 10–2	Hong Kong; W 12–2 (F/7)	1	Did not advance	5

Roster

The following is the Pakistan roster for the men's baseball tournament of the 2018 Asian Games.

Manager
Muhammad Mohsin Khan

Coaches
Nisar Ahmad
Syed Babar Ali Sherazi

Pos.	No.	Player	Date of birth (age)	Bats	Throws	Club
P	1	Tariq Nadeem	10 April 1979 (aged 39)			(Pakistan) NIL
OF	3	Muhammad Sumair Zawar	21 April 1988 (aged 30)			(Pakistan) NIL
IF	9	Arsalan Jamashed	5 June 1991 (aged 27)			(Pakistan) NIL
IF	11	Faqeer Hussain	1 April 1987 (aged 31)			(Pakistan) NIL
IF	16	Muhammad Zakir	3 March 1997 (aged 21)			(Pakistan) NIL
P	20	Muhammad Usman	1 May 1986 (aged 32)			(Pakistan) NIL
C	24	Umair Imdad Bhatti	3 March 1987 (aged 31)			(Pakistan) NIL
P	25	Muhammad Waseem	9 September 1991 (aged 26)			(Pakistan) NIL
OF	27	Muhammad Rafi	7 October 1990 (aged 27)			(Pakistan) NIL
P	33	Ihsan Ullah	23 January 1986 (aged 32)			(Pakistan) NIL
IF	35	Muhammad Hussain	5 December 1997 (aged 20)			(Pakistan) NIL
P	44	Muhammad Amjad Aslam	10 April 1995 (aged 23)			(Pakistan) NIL
P	55	Inayat Ullah Khan	12 February 1988 (aged 30)			(Pakistan) NIL
IF	66	Jawad Ali	24 March 1993 (aged 25)			(Pakistan) NIL
OF	77	Fazal Ur Rehman	13 September 1990 (aged 27)			(Pakistan) NIL
OF	88	Ubaid Ullah	14 February 1985 (aged 33)			(Pakistan) NIL

Round 2 – Group A

Pos	Team	Pld	W	L	RF	RA	PCT	GB	Qualification
1	Japan	3	3	0	56	2	1.000	—	Super round
2	China	3	2	1	33	20	.667	1	Super round
3	Pakistan	3	1	2	11	32	.333	2	Consolation round
4	Thailand	3	0	3	1	47	.000	3	Consolation round

Source: OCA

26 August; 9:00	Japan	15–0 (F/6)	Pakistan	Rawamangun Baseball Field, Jakarta; Attendance: 200; Umpires: Huang Jun-jeh (TPE)
26 August; 9:00	WP: Yudai Aranishi	Boxscore	LP: Tariq Nadeem	Rawamangun Baseball Field, Jakarta; Attendance: 200; Umpires: Huang Jun-jeh (TPE)
26 August; 9:00	HR: Kohei Sasagawa (1)	Boxscore		Rawamangun Baseball Field, Jakarta; Attendance: 200; Umpires: Huang Jun-jeh (TPE)

Team	1	2	3	4	5	6	7	8	9	R	H	E
Pakistan	0	0	0	0	0	0	—	—	—	0	4	1
Japan	0	4	8	1	1	1	—	—	—	15	15	0

27 August; 9:00	Thailand	1–8	Pakistan	Rawamangun Baseball Field, Jakarta; Attendance: 70; Umpires: Cheung Sui Man (HKG)
27 August; 9:00	LP: Kevin Irwin	Boxscore	WP: Muhammad Usman	Rawamangun Baseball Field, Jakarta; Attendance: 70; Umpires: Cheung Sui Man (HKG)
27 August; 9:00	HR: Joe Daru (1)	Boxscore	HR: Arsalan Jamashed (1)	Rawamangun Baseball Field, Jakarta; Attendance: 70; Umpires: Cheung Sui Man (HKG)

Team	1	2	3	4	5	6	7	8	9	R	H	E
Pakistan	3	0	0	0	0	0	0	1	4	8	7	0
Thailand	1	0	0	0	0	0	0	0	0	1	6	5

28 August; 14:00	Pakistan	3–16 (F/7)	China	Rawamangun Baseball Field, Jakarta; Attendance: 100; Umpires: Yang Jae-man (KOR)
28 August; 14:00	LP: Ihsanullah	Boxscore	WP: Meng Weiqiang	Rawamangun Baseball Field, Jakarta; Attendance: 100; Umpires: Yang Jae-man (KOR)
28 August; 14:00		Boxscore	HR: Chen Chen (1), Song Yunqi (1)	Rawamangun Baseball Field, Jakarta; Attendance: 100; Umpires: Yang Jae-man (KOR)

Team	1	2	3	4	5	6	7	8	9	R	H	E
China	1	3	0	0	3	0	9	—	—	16	19	1
Pakistan	0	0	0	0	1	0	2	—	—	3	6	3

Consolation round

Pos	Team	Pld	W	L	RF	RA	PCT	GB
1	Pakistan	3	3	0	30	5	1.000	—
2	Hong Kong	3	2	1	14	20	.667	1
3	Indonesia	3	1	2	18	28	.333	2
4	Thailand	3	0	3	16	25	.000	3

Source: OCA

30 August; 9:00	Pakistan	10–2	Indonesia	Rawamangun Baseball Field, Jakarta; Attendance: 80; Umpires: Sung Yu-meng (TPE)
30 August; 9:00	WP: Muhammad Usman; Sv: Inayatullah Khan	Boxscore	LP: Nanda Dwi Saputra	Rawamangun Baseball Field, Jakarta; Attendance: 80; Umpires: Sung Yu-meng (TPE)
30 August; 9:00	HR: Muhammad Zakir (1), Jawad Ali (1)	Boxscore		Rawamangun Baseball Field, Jakarta; Attendance: 80; Umpires: Sung Yu-meng (TPE)

Team	1	2	3	4	5	6	7	8	9	R	H	E
Indonesia	1	0	0	0	0	1	0	0	0	2	8	4
Pakistan	0	0	0	4	0	5	0	1	X	10	12	1

31 August; 8:00	Pakistan	12–2 (F/7)	Hong Kong	Rawamangun Baseball Field, Jakarta; Attendance: 75; Umpires: Yoshinori Koide (JPN)
31 August; 8:00	WP: Ihsanullah	Boxscore	LP: Leung Chung Hei	Rawamangun Baseball Field, Jakarta; Attendance: 75; Umpires: Yoshinori Koide (JPN)

Team	1	2	3	4	5	6	7	8	9	R	H	E
Hong Kong	0	0	1	0	0	0	1	—	—	2	6	3
Pakistan	1	1	0	4	0	1	5	—	—	12	15	0

== Boxing ==
Pakistan have prepared 23 boxers with 18 men's and 5 women's in the training camp for the Asian Games. The participating squad for the Games announced in 10 August.

Men

Athlete	Event	Round of 32	Round of 16	Quarterfinals	Semifinals	Final	Rank
Athlete	Event	Opposition Result	Opposition Result	Opposition Result	Opposition Result	Opposition Result	Rank
Mohibullah	–49 kg	Tu P-w (TPE); L 1–4	Did not Advance				
Syed Muhammad Asif	–52 kg	Bye	A Usenaliev (KGZ); L 0–5	Did not Advance			
Naqeebullah	–56 kg	M Al-Naqbi (UAE); W 3–0	N Dorji (BHU); W 3–2	Xu BX (CHN); L 0–5	Did not Advance		
Suleman Baloch	–64 kg	Bye	Lim H-s (KOR); L 0–5	Did not Advance			
Gul Zaib	–69 kg	Bye	A Shymbergenov (KAZ); L 0–5	Did not Advance			
Tanveer Ahmed	–75 kg	Bye	VK Yadav (IND); L 0–5	Did not Advance			

Women

Athlete	Event	Round of 32	Round of 16	Quarterfinals	Semifinals	Final	Rank
Athlete	Event	Opposition Result	Opposition Result	Opposition Result	Opposition Result	Opposition Result	Rank
Razia Bano Aziz	–51 kg	Bye	N Kyzaibay (KAZ); L RSC	Did not Advance			
Rukhsana Perveen	–60 kg	—N/a	Pavitra (IND); L RSC	Did not Advance			

== Bridge ==
Pakistan Bridge Federation (PBF) was named eleven athletes (9 men's and 2 women's) to compete at the Games.

Men

Athlete	Event	Qualification		Semifinal		Final	
Athlete	Event	Point	Rank	Point	Rank	Point	Rank
Farrukh Liaqat; Gulzar Ahmed Bilal	Pair	1430.9	22 Q	861.8	24	Did not Advance	
Syed Nadir Ali Shah; Asadullah Khan	Pair	1401.1	25	Did not Advance			
Assad Maqbool; Muhammad Ghalib Ali Bandesha	Pair	1347	30	Did not Advance			
Asadullah Khan; Assad Maqbool; Farrukh Liaqat; Muhammad Ghalib Ali Bandesha; Syed Nadir Ali Shah; Gulzar Ahmed Bilal	Team	102.05	10	Did not Advance			

Mixed

Athlete	Event	Qualification		Semifinal		Final	
Athlete	Event	Point	Rank	Point	Rank	Point	Rank
Fatima Raza; Rubina Agha; Hasan Askari; Rashid-ul-Ghazi; Tehsin Ali Gheewala	Supermixed team	99.58	5	Did not Advance			

== Esports (demonstration) ==
Pakistan qualified via South Asia qualifier to compete in the League of Legends tournament at the eSports demonstration event with six men's player under coach Hassan Abdullah (Flux).

Athlete	ID	Event	Group stage		Semifinals	Final / BM	
Athlete	ID	Event	Oppositions scores	Rank	Opposition score	Opposition score	Rank
Adnan Umer Hamza Haroon Syed Abdul Rehman; Jarrar Amjad	YasugaKazama; Deep Vision; ToxicAndUgly; JisatsuCarry; Neo Fujin; Zen San	League of Legends	Chinese Taipei: L 0–2; Indonesia: W 2–0; Saudi Arabia: L 0–2	3	Did not Advance		

== Fencing ==
Pakistan entered four fencers at the Games.

Individual

Athlete	Event	Preliminary		Round of 32	Round of 16	Quarterfinals	Semifinals	Final	
Athlete	Event	Opposition score	Rank	Opposition score	Opposition score	Opposition score	Opposition score	Opposition score	Rank
Nazar Abbas Bhatti	Men's épée	M Al-Shamari (QAT): L 1–5; Lan MH (CHN): L 0–5; F Alimov (UZB): L 1–5; MR Mohamed (MAS): L 1–5; A Al-Shatti (KUW): DNS; Jung J-s (KOR): L 1–5	6	Did not Advance					32
Ali Seeduddin	Men's épée	B Batkhüü (MGL): L 4–5; Nguyễn PĐ (VIE): L 0–5; O Sokolov (UZB): L 1–5; D Siahaan (INA): L 1–5; D Alexanin (KAZ): L 1–5; Koh IJ (MAS): L 3–5	7	Did not Advance					31

Team

Athlete	Event	Round of 16	Quarterfinals	Semifinals	Final	
Athlete	Event	Opposition score	Opposition score	Opposition score	Opposition score	Rank
Mujaded Awan; Nazar Abbas Bhatti; Muhammad Zaheer Mushtaq; Ali Saeeduddin	Men's épée	Japan (JPN); L 19–45	Did not Advance			14

== Field hockey ==
Pakistan Hockey Federation (PHF) entered the men's field hockey team that competed in pool B with 18 member squad.

Summary

Key:

- FT = After full time
- P = Match decided by penalty-shootout

Team	Event	Preliminary round						Semifinal	Final / BM / Pl.	
Team	Event	Opposition Result	Opposition Result	Opposition Result	Opposition Result	Opposition Result	Rank	Opposition Result	Opposition Result	Rank
Pakistan men's	Men's tournament	Thailand; W 10–0	Oman; W 10–0	Kazakhstan; W 16–0	Malaysia; W 4–1	Bangladesh; W 5–0	1 Q	Japan; L 0–1	India; L 2–1	4

=== Men's tournament ===
Roster

The following is the Pakistan roster in the men's field hockey tournament of the 2018 Asian Games.

Head coach: (Netherlands) Roelant Oltmans

1. Imran Butt (GK)
3. Mubashar Ali
5. Toseeq Arshad
6. Rashid Mehmood
7. Muhammad Dilber
8. Muhammad Irfan
10. Ali Shan
11. Rizwan Ali (C)
12. Amjad Ali (GK)
13. Junaid Manzoor
14. Muhammad Umar Bhutta
16. Ammad Butt
17. Shafqat Rasool
18. Muhammad Atiq
20. Muhammad Faisal Qadir
23. Ajaz Ahmad
21. Tasawar Abbas
27. Abu Mahmood

Pool B

Pos	Team	Pld	W	D	L	PF	PA	PD	Pts	Qualification
1	Pakistan	5	5	0	0	45	1	+44	15	Semi-finals
2	Malaysia	5	4	0	1	41	6	+35	12	Semi-finals
3	Bangladesh	5	3	0	2	11	15	−4	9	Fifth place game
4	Oman	5	2	0	3	7	19	−12	6	Seventh place game
5	Thailand	5	1	0	4	4	27	−23	3	Ninth place game
6	Kazakhstan	5	0	0	5	5	45	−40	0	Eleventh place game

Source: FIH
Rules for classification: 1) points; 2) goal difference; 3) goals scored; 4) head-to-head result.

20 August 2018
12:00

Pakistan	10–0	Thailand
Arshad 15', 50'; Irfan 22'; Atiq 23', 39', 43'; Mahnood 31'; Ali 33'; Mahmood 42', 49'	Report

Umpires:
Gus Soteriades (USA)
Michihiko Watanabe (JPN)

22 August 2018
20:00

Pakistan	10–0	Oman
Bhutta 2'; Ahmad 15'; Irfan 34', 59'; Shan 37', 44', 55'; Dilber 40', 49'; Atiq 41'	Report

Umpires:
Javed Shaikh (IND)
Gareth Greenfield (NZL)

24 August 2018
16:00

Kazakhstan	0–16	Pakistan
	Report	Arshad 2', 34', 47', 60'; Dilber 7'; Shan 13', 38'; Bhutta 15', 58'; Mahmood 29', 30', 38'; R. Ali 51', 55'; Atiq 59'; M. Ali 60+'

Umpires:
Dayan Dissanayake (SRI)
Michihiko Watanabe (JPN)

26 August 2018
20:00

Pakistan	4–1	Malaysia
Irfan 6'; Ahmad 38', 48'; Ali 43'	Report	Jali 11'

Umpires:
Gus Soteriades (USA)
Federico Garcia (URU)

28 August 2018
18:00

Bangladesh	0-5	Pakistan
	Report	Atiq 2', 48'; Ali 9', 25'; Shan 36'

Umpires:
Javed Shaikh (IND)
Gareth Greenfield (NZL)

Semifinal

30 August 2018
20:00

Pakistan	0–1	Japan
	Report	Yamada 18'

Umpires:
Javed Shaikh (IND)
Federico Garcia (URU)

Bronze medal game

1 September 2018
17:30

Pakistan	1–2	India
Atiq 52'	Report	Akashdeep 3'; Harmanpreet 50'

Umpires:
Ilanggo Kanabathu (MAS)
Gareth Greenfield (NZL)

== Football ==
Pakistan competed in the group D at the men's football event.

Summary

Team	Event	Group Stage				Round of 16	Quarterfinal	Semifinal	Final / BM	
Team	Event	Opposition Score	Opposition Score	Opposition Score	Rank	Opposition Score	Opposition Score	Opposition Score	Opposition Score	Rank
Pakistan men's	Men's tournament	Vietnam; L 0–3	Japan; L 0–4	Nepal; W 2–1	3	Did not Advance				17

=== Men's tournament ===
Roster

The following is the Pakistan squad in the men's football tournament of the 2018 Asian Games. The team of 20 players was officially named on 10 August.

Head coach: (Brazil) José Antonio Nogueira

No.	Pos.	Player	Date of birth (age)	Club
2	DF	Umar Hayat	22 September 1996 (aged 21)	(Pakistan Football Federation) WAPDA
3	DF	Mohsin Ali	1 June 1996 (aged 22)	(Pakistan Football Federation) WAPDA
4	DF	Mehdi Hassan	20 July 1999 (aged 19)	(Pakistan Football Federation) Air Force
6	DF	Muhammad Bilal	14 August 1996 (aged 21)	(Pakistan Football Federation) WAPDA
7	FW	Mansoor Khan	20 February 1997 (aged 21)	(Pakistan Football Federation) Air Force
8	MF	Mehmood Khan*	10 June 1991 (aged 27)	(Pakistan Football Federation) Sui Southern Gas Company
9	MF	Yousaf Ahmed	6 November 1997 (aged 20)	(Pakistan Football Federation) KRL
10	MF	Muhammad Riaz	27 February 1996 (aged 22)	(Pakistan Football Federation) K-Electric
11	FW	Maqbool	4 April 1997 (aged 21)	(Pakistan Football Federation) NBP
13	DF	Shahbaz Younas	2 March 1996 (aged 22)	(Pakistan Football Federation) Army
14	DF	Ali Khan Niazi	14 December 2000 (aged 17)	(Pakistan Football Federation) K-Electric
15	MF	Zainul Abideen Ishaque	24 May 1998 (aged 20)	(Pakistan Football Federation) K-Electric
16	DF	Waseem Asghar	8 July 2000 (aged 18)	(Pakistan Football Federation) Civil Aviation Authority
17	MF	Saddam Hussain* (captain)	10 April 1993 (aged 25)	(Pakistan Football Federation) Sui Southern Gas Company
18	DF	Arslan Ali	20 December 1998 (aged 19)	(Pakistan Football Federation) KRL
19	MF	Adeel Ali	5 January 2000 (aged 18)	(Pakistan Football Federation) WAPDA
20	MF	Sohail Khan	1 January 1996 (aged 22)	(Pakistan Football Federation) Air Force
22	GK	Ahsanullah Ahmed	25 February 1995 (aged 23)	(Pakistan Football Federation) Sui Southern Gas Company
23	FW	Noman Noor	10 September 1997 (aged 20)	(Pakistan Football Federation) K-Electric
33	GK	Saqib Hanif* (vice-captain)	28 April 1994 (aged 24)	(Football Association of Maldives) Maalhos

* Over-aged player.

Group D

Pos	Team	Pld	W	D	L	GF	GA	GD	Pts	Qualification
1	Vietnam	3	3	0	0	6	0	+6	9	Advance to knockout stage
2	Japan	3	2	0	1	5	1	+4	6	Advance to knockout stage
3	Pakistan	3	1	0	2	2	8	−6	3	
4	Nepal	3	0	0	3	1	5	−4	0	

Source: Asian Games 2018
Rules for classification: Group stage tiebreakers
14 August 2018
16:00 UTC+7

Vietnam	3–0	Pakistan
Nguyễn Quang Hải 21'; Nguyễn Văn Quyết 41'; Nguyễn Công Phượng 72'	Report

Wibawa Mukti Stadium, Cikarang
Referee: Ahmad Yaqoub Ibrahim (Jordan)

16 August 2018
16:00 UTC+7

Pakistan	0–4	Japan
	Report	Iwasaki 2', 35'; Hatate 9'; Maeda 10'

Wibawa Mukti Stadium, Cikarang
Referee: Ammar Mahfoodh (Bahrain)

19 August 2018
16:00 UTC+7

Pakistan	2–1	Nepal
Bilal 54'; Hussain 72' (pen.)	Report	Younas 12' (o.g.)

Patriot Candrabhaga Stadium, Bekasi
Referee: Baraa Aisha (Palestine)

== Golf ==
Men

Athlete	Event	Round 1	Round 2	Round 3	Round 4	Total		
Athlete	Event	Score	Score	Score	Score	Score	Par	Rank
Ahmad Baig	Individual	78	76	76	76	306	+18	47
Taimoor Khan	Individual	75	76	72	75	298	+10	37

== Gymnastics ==
Pakistan was named one gymnast to compete in the artistic event.

=== Artistic ===
Athlete	Event	Apparatus						Total	Rank
Athlete	Event	F	PH	R	V	PB	HB	Total	Rank
Asad Jooma	Men's All-around	11.750	6.950	6.250	14.000	11.300	10.900	61.150	28

== Handball ==
Pakistan men's team competed at the Games in the group B.

Summary

Key:

- ET – After extra time
- P – Match decided by penalty-shootout.

Team	Event	Preliminary	Standing	Main / Class.	Rank / standing	Semifinals / Pl.	Final / BM / Pl.	
Team	Event	Opposition score	Standing	Opposition score	Rank / standing	Opposition score	Opposition score	Rank
Pakistan men's	Men's tournament	Group B South Korea: L 16–47; Japan: L 15–38	3	Group III; Chinese Taipei: L 32–36; Indonesia: W 28–23; India: L 27–28; Malaysia: W 27–24	11	Did not Advance		

=== Men's tournament ===
Roster

- Muhammad Nawaz
- Hazrat Hussain
- Naseen Ullah
- Asim Saeed
- Muhammad Shahid Pervaiz
- Muhammad Zubair
- Muhammad Uzair Atif
- Nasir Hussain
- Tahir Ali
- Asif Hayat
- Muzamal Hussain
- Muhammad Shahid Bashir

Group B

Pos	Team	Pld	W	D	L	GF	GA	GD	Pts	Qualification
1	South Korea	2	1	1	0	73	42	+31	3 (Note: Head-to-head result: KOR 26–26 JPN. Overall goal difference was used as the tiebreaker.)	Main round / Group 1–2
2	Japan	2	1	1	0	64	41	+23	3	Main round / Group 1–2
3	Pakistan	2	0	0	2	31	85	−54	0	Main round / Group 3

Source: AHF
Notes:

13 August; 18:00	Pakistan	16–47	South Korea	POPKI Sports Hall, Jakarta; Referees: Li, Ke (CHN)
13 August; 18:00	Saeed 6	(4–26)	Hwang 11	POPKI Sports Hall, Jakarta; Referees: Li, Ke (CHN)
13 August; 18:00	1× (yellow card) 3× (suspension)		1× (yellow card)	POPKI Sports Hall, Jakarta; Referees: Li, Ke (CHN)

15 August; 14:00	Japan	38–15	Pakistan	POPKI Sports Hall, Jakarta; Referees: Al-Wahibi, Al-Shahi (OMA)
15 August; 14:00	Shida 7	(20–7)	M. Hussain 5	POPKI Sports Hall, Jakarta; Referees: Al-Wahibi, Al-Shahi (OMA)
15 August; 14:00	3× (yellow card) 2× (suspension)		2× (yellow card) 1× (suspension)	POPKI Sports Hall, Jakarta; Referees: Al-Wahibi, Al-Shahi (OMA)

Classification round

Pos	Team	Pld	W	D	L	GF	GA	GD	Pts
1	Chinese Taipei	4	4	0	0	142	95	+47	8
2	India	4	3	0	1	141	104	+37	6
3	Pakistan	4	2	0	2	134	111	+23	4
4	Indonesia	4	1	0	3	96	124	−28	2
5	Malaysia	4	0	0	4	78	157	−79	0

Source: AHF

20 August; 9:00	Chinese Taipei	36–32	Pakistan	POPKI Sports Hall, Jakarta; Referees: Hizaki, Ikebuchi (JPN)
20 August; 9:00	Chao 8	(16–14)	Pervaiz 8	POPKI Sports Hall, Jakarta; Referees: Hizaki, Ikebuchi (JPN)
20 August; 9:00	2× (yellow card) 1× (suspension)		4× (suspension)	POPKI Sports Hall, Jakarta; Referees: Hizaki, Ikebuchi (JPN)

21 August; 9:00	Indonesia	23–28	Pakistan	POPKI Sports Hall, Jakarta; Referees: Al-Saqer, Al-Suqufi (KSA)
21 August; 9:00	Tolang 11	(10–12)	M. Hussain 8	POPKI Sports Hall, Jakarta; Referees: Al-Saqer, Al-Suqufi (KSA)
21 August; 9:00	1× (yellow card) 2× (suspension)		1× (yellow card) 2× (suspension)	POPKI Sports Hall, Jakarta; Referees: Al-Saqer, Al-Suqufi (KSA)

24 August; 11:00	Pakistan	27–28	India	POPKI Sports Hall, Jakarta; Referees: Li, Ke (CHN)
24 August; 11:00	M. Hussain 7	(12–14)	D'Cunha 9	POPKI Sports Hall, Jakarta; Referees: Li, Ke (CHN)
24 August; 11:00	2× (yellow card) 3× (suspension)		3× (yellow card) 2× (suspension)	POPKI Sports Hall, Jakarta; Referees: Li, Ke (CHN)

29 August; 18:00	Malaysia	24–47	Pakistan	POPKI Sports Hall, Jakarta; Referees: Al-Marhoon, Al-Mawt (BHR)
29 August; 18:00	Jamaluddin 6	(9–21)	N. Hussain, M. Hussain 11	POPKI Sports Hall, Jakarta; Referees: Al-Marhoon, Al-Mawt (BHR)
29 August; 18:00	2× (yellow card) 3× (suspension)		1× (yellow card)	POPKI Sports Hall, Jakarta; Referees: Al-Marhoon, Al-Mawt (BHR)

== Ju-jitsu ==
Pakistan prepared their team to compete at the Games.

Key:

- ADV – Won by advantages.
- RDC – Won by referee decision.
- SUB – Won by submission.

Men

Athlete	Event	Round of 64	Round of 32	Round of 16	Quarterfinals	Semifinals	Repechage	Final / BM	Rank
Athlete	Event	Opposition Result	Opposition Result	Opposition Result	Opposition Result	Opposition Result	Opposition Result	Opposition Result	Rank
Shahid Khan	–56 kg	—N/a	Bye	K Meredow (TKM); L 0–0^{ADV}	Did not Advance				
Muhammed Yousuf Nabi	–69 kg	—N/a	A Mones (YEM); DSQ	Did not Advance					
Muhammad Mumtaz	–77 kg	M Abdalhafiz (PLE); W 3–0	N Alymkulov (KGZ); L 0–100^{SUB}	Did not Advance					
Abdul Rehman	–77 kg	Bye	N Al-Qosaibi (BRN); L 0–100^{SUB}	Did not Advance					

== Judo ==
Pakistan Judo Federation announced 7 athletes (4 men's and 3 women's) that will participate in the Games on 19 July 2018. On the directive of Pakistan Sports Board (PSB) this was reduced to a contingent of only 2 men.

Key:

- 1st number — Ippon
- 2nd number — Waza-ari
- s — Shido

Men

Athlete	Event	Round of 32	Round of 16	Quarterfinals	Semifinals	Repechage	Final / BM	Rank
Athlete	Event	Opposition Result	Opposition Result	Opposition Result	Opposition Result	Opposition Result	Opposition Result	Rank
Qaisar Khan	–90 kg	Shen C-e (TPE); L 00–01s2	Did not Advance					
Shah Hussain Shah	–100 kg	Bye	V Demyanenko (KAZ); L 00–10s1	Did not Advance				

== Kabaddi ==
Pakistan sent a squad to compete at the Games.

Summary

Team	Event	Group stage						Semifinal	Final	
Team	Event	Opposition score	Opposition score	Opposition score	Opposition score	Opposition score	Rank	Opposition score	Opposition score	Rank
Pakistan men's	Men	Malaysia; W 62–17	Iran; L 20–36	Indonesia; W 40–11	Japan; W 25–14	Nepal; W 38–20	2 Q	South Korea; L 24–27	Did not Advance	3rd place, bronze medalist(s)

=== Men's tournament ===
Team roster

- Nasir Ali
- Waseem Sajjad
- Muhammad Nadeem
- Muhammad Rizwan
- Abid Hussain
- Waqar Ali
- Tahseen Ullah
- Usman Zada
- Mudassar Ali
- Kashif Razzaq
- Muhammad Imran
- Hassan Raza

Pos	Team	Pld	W	D	L	PF	PA	PD	Pts	Qualification
1	Iran	5	5	0	0	289	109	+180	10	Semifinals
2	Pakistan	5	4	0	1	185	98	+87	8	Semifinals
3	Indonesia	5	3	0	2	132	182	−50	6	
4	Japan	5	2	0	3	121	162	−41	4	
5	Nepal	5	1	0	4	127	194	−67	2	
6	Malaysia	5	0	0	5	100	209	−109	0	

Source: OCA

19 August
17:00

Malaysia	17–62 (HT: 4–32)	Pakistan

Garuda Theatre, Jakarta

20 August
17:00

Pakistan	20–36 (HT: 8–19)	Iran

Garuda Theatre, Jakarta

21 August
19:00

Indonesia	11–40 (HT: 5–18)	Pakistan

Garuda Theatre, Jakarta

22 August
15:00

Pakistan	25–14 (HT: 9–6)	Japan

Garuda Theatre, Jakarta

23 August
10:00

Nepal	20–38 (HT: 12–15)	Pakistan

Garuda Theatre, Jakarta

Semifinal

23 August
17:00

South Korea	27–24 (HT: 11–10)	Pakistan

Garuda Theatre, Jakarta

== Karate ==
Pakistan named six athletes (3 men's and 3 women's) to compete in the kumite event at the Games.

Men

Athlete	Event	Round of 32	Round of 16	Quarterfinals	Semifinals	Repechage 1	Repechage 2	Final / BM	Rank
Athlete	Event	Opposition Result	Opposition Result	Opposition Result	Opposition Result	Opposition Result	Opposition Result	Opposition Result	Rank
Naseer Ahmed	–67 kg	Bye	Al-Khathami (KSA); L 1–3	Did not Advance					
Saadi Abbas Jalbani	–75 kg	Abu-Leifa (PLE); W 3–0	Ghavidel (QAT); W 6–1	Raghonathan (MAS); W 10–5	Al-Turkistani (KSA); L 2–4	Bye		Al-Najjar (JOR); L 2^{H}–5	5
Baz Muhammad	+84 kg	—N/a	Hassanein (QAT); L 0–1	Did not Advance			—N/a	Did not Advance	

Women

Athlete	Event	Round of 16	Quarterfinals	Semifinals	Repechage	Final / BM	Rank
Athlete	Event	Opposition Result	Opposition Result	Opposition Result	Opposition Result	Opposition Result	Rank
Benish Akbar	–50 kg	Al-Ajmi (UAE); L 0–5	Did not Advance				
Kulsoom Hazara	–68 kg	Bye	Nguyễn (VIE); L 0–5	Did not Advance			
Nargis Hameedullah	+68 kg	—N/a	Bye	Gao (CHN); L 0–8	—N/a	Karki (NEP); W 3–1	3rd place, bronze medalist(s)

== Kurash ==
Pakistan was named four men's athlete to compete at the Games.

Men

Athlete	Event	Round of 32	Round of 16	Quarterfinal	Semifinal	Final	
Athlete	Event	Opposition Score	Opposition Score	Opposition Score	Opposition Score	Opposition Score	Rank
Muhammad Shehroze Razi	–66 kg	A Llamas (PHI); L 000−101	Did not Advance				
Syed Samiullah	–66 kg	U Thapa (NEP); L 001−001	Did not Advance				
Dilawar Khan Sannan	–81 kg	M Kasem (SYR); L 000−110	Did not Advance				
Zunair Bin Zahir	+90 kg	B Sugara (INA); L 000−100	Did not Advance				

== Paragliding ==
Men

Athlete	Event	Round										Total	Rank
Athlete	Event	1	2	3	4	5	6	7	8	9	10	Total	Rank
Farman Ahmed	Individual accuracy	~~500~~	500	18	22	500	500	500	500	199	500	920	31

== Pencak silat ==
Seni

Athlete	Event	Preliminary		Final	
Athlete	Event	Result	Rank	Result	Rank
Noman Yousaf	Men's tunggal	412	4	Did not Advance	

Tanding

Athlete	Event	Round of 16	Quarterfinals	Semifinals	Final	
Athlete	Event	Opposition Result	Opposition Result	Opposition Result	Opposition Result	Rank
Adnan	Men's –55 kg	Bye	MF Nasir (MAS); L 0–5	Did not Advance		
Umer Farooq	Men's –70 kg	Bye	Z Akimkanov (KGZ); L 0–5	Did not Advance		
Rana Ali Raza	Men's –75 kg	Bye	D Tokurov (KGZ); L 0–5	Did not Advance		
Muhammad Zubair Arshad	Men's –95 kg	Bye	T Pokjay (THA); L 0–5	Did not Advance		

== Rowing ==
Men

Athlete	Event	Heats		Repechage		Final	
Athlete	Event	Time	Rank	Time	Rank	Time	Rank
Amjad Baig	Single sculls	9:24.90	6 R	8:34.50	5 FB	8:20.55	11
Asim Ejaz	Lightweight single sculls	8:16.09	5 R	8:53.48	4 FB	EXC	–

Women

Athlete	Event	Heats		Repechage		Final	
Athlete	Event	Time	Rank	Time	Rank	Time	Rank
Rabia Rafique	Single sculls	12:16.54	6 R	11:15.15	5 FB	10:37.87	11

== Rugby sevens ==
Pakistan drawn in group A in the men's team event.

Team	Event	Preliminary	Standing	Classification (Pl.)	Rank	Quarterfinal	Semifinal / Pl.	Final / BM / Pl.	
Team	Event	Opposition score	Standing	Opposition score	Rank	Opposition score	Opposition score	Opposition score	Rank
Pakistan men's	Men's tournament	Group A Hong Kong: L 5–64; Thailand: L 0–43; China: L 0–53	4	Indonesia: W 21–5; Afghanistan: L 7–15; United Arab Emirates: W 74–0	10	Did not Advance			

=== Men's tournament ===
Squad

The following is the Pakistan squad in the men's rugby sevens tournament of the 2018 Asian Games.

Head coach: Shakeel Ahmed

- Muhammad Afzal
- Muhammad Shoaib Akbar
- Ahmed Wasim Akram
- Musdaq Altaf
- Faisal Aslam
- Khalid Hussain Bhatti
- Daud Gill
- Muhammad Haroon
- Kashif Khwaja
- Nasir Mehmood
- Ali Shahid
- Muhammad Waqas

Group A

Pos	Team	Pld	W	D	L	PF	PA	PD	Pts	Qualification
1	Hong Kong	3	3	0	0	142	29	+113	9	Quarterfinals
2	China	3	2	0	1	110	49	+61	7	Quarterfinals
3	Thailand	3	1	0	2	57	76	−19	5	Quarterfinals
4	Pakistan	3	0	0	3	5	160	−155	3	Ranking round 9–12

Source: Results

30 August
12:50

Hong Kong	64–5	Pakistan
Try: Yiu (3) 1' m, 3' c, 7' c Jones (2) 5' c, 7+' m Denmark (3) 10' c, 12' c, 14+' c Woodward 13' c Lee 14' c Con: Rimene (4/6); Hood (2/3); Herbert (1/1)		Try: Aslam 9' m Con: Akram (0/1)

Gelora Bung Karno Rugby Field, Jakarta
Referee: Charlie Brown (Ireland)

30 August
16:08

Thailand	43–0	Pakistan
Try: Thitisakulvit (2) 3' m, 11' c Palukpetch 4' m Khamkoet 7' c Puangpun 8' m Chakrabandhu 10' c Kradkrayang 14' c Con: Khamkoet (1/3); Thitisakulvit (2/3); Laksanasompong (1/1)

Gelora Bung Karno Rugby Field, Jakarta
Referee: Noriaki Hashimoto (Japan)

31 August
12:50

China	53–0	Pakistan
Try: Shan (2) 2' m, 7' m Jiang (2) 4' c, 6' c Hu 8' m Ma 10' m Liu J. (2) 12' c, 14' c Wang 13' m Con: Shan (0/3); Ma (2/3); Feng (2/2); Wang (0/1)

Gelora Bung Karno Rugby Field, Jakarta
Referee: Patrick Kwok (Hong Kong)

Classification round (9–12)

Pos	Team	Pld	W	D	L	PF	PA	PD	Pts
1	Afghanistan	3	3	0	0	94	19	+75	9
2	Pakistan	3	2	0	1	102	20	+82	7
3	Indonesia	3	1	0	2	65	55	+10	5
4	United Arab Emirates	3	0	0	3	5	172	−167	3

Source: Results

31 August
16:52

Indonesia	5–21	Pakistan
Try: Pratama 12' m Con: Sauri (0/1)		Try: Bhatti 1' c Mehmood 9' c Altaf 13' c Con: Mehmood (3/3)

Gelora Bung Karno Rugby Field, Jakarta
Referee: Leow Wei Liang (Singapore)

1 September
11:00

Afghanistan	15–7	Pakistan
Try: O. Slaimankhel (2) 4' m, 13' m Gazang 10' m Con: O. Slaimankhel (0/3)		Try: Bhatti 12' c Con: Akram (1/1)

Gelora Bung Karno Rugby Field, Jakarta
Referee: Charlie Brown (Ireland)

1 September
17:40

Pakistan	74–0	United Arab Emirates
Try: Aslam (5) 2' c, 5' m, 7' c, 8' c, 14' m Mehmood (4) 6' c, 7+' m, 11' c, 14+' c Gill (2) 10' c, 12' m Akram 11' m Con: Mehmood (4/4); Akram (1/4); Afzal (2/4)

Gelora Bung Karno Rugby Field, Jakarta
Referee: Craig Chan (Canada)

== Sailing ==
Men

Athlete	Event	Race															Total	Rank
Athlete	Event	1	2	3	4	5	6	7	8	9	10	11	12	13	14	15	Total	Rank
Qasim Abbas	RS:X	7	7	9	7	6	9	9	8	8	9	9	9	~~(10)~~	9	7	113	9
Najeeb Ullah Khan	Laser	11	11	11	~~(12)~~	12	11	12	11	9	11	10	11	—N/a			120	11
Khalid Hussain; Rehman Ullah	470	~~(10)~~	9	9	10	9	8	9	7	9	10	9	9	—N/a			98	9

Mixed

Athlete	Event	Race												Total	Rank
Athlete	Event	1	2	3	4	5	6	7	8	9	10	11	12	Total	Rank
Muhammad Awais	Laser 4.7	18	~~(22)~~	16	18	18	19	19	20	18	21	22	15	204	21

== Sepak takraw ==
Pakistan was named six men's athletes to compete at the Games. The team were drawn in group B for the men's quadran event, and in group A for the men's regu event. This event is the first participation for the Pakistan sepak takraw team at the Asian Games.

Men

Athlete	Event	Group Stage					Semifinal	Final	
Athlete	Event	Opposition Score	Opposition Score	Opposition Score	Opposition Score	Rank	Opposition Score	Opposition Score	Rank
Shabbir Ahmed; Shiraz Asif; Hussain Ahmed; Shahid Hameed; Sarfaraz Rehman	Regu	Singapore (SGP); L 0–2	Indonesia (INA); L 0–2	Philippines (PHI); L 0–2	—N/a	4	Did not Advance		
Shabbir Ahmed; Shiraz Asif; Hussain Ahmed; Shahid Hameed; Sarfaraz Rehman; Syed Abdul Basit	Quadrant	Singapore (SGP); L 0–2	Iran (IRI); L 0–2	Nepal (NEP); L 0–2	Vietnam (VIE); L 0–2	5	Did not Advance		

== Shooting ==
Men

Athlete	Event	Qualification		Final	
Athlete	Event	Points	Rank	Points	Rank
Ghulam Mustafa Bashir	25 m rapid fire pistol	577	8	Did not Advance	
Muhammad Khalil Akhtar	25 m rapid fire pistol	569	12	Did not Advance	
Ghufran Adil	10 m air rifle	616.8	25	Did not Advance	
Zeeshan Farid	10 m air rifle	611.1	31	Did not Advance	
Ghufran Adil	50 m rifle three positions	1152	14	Did not Advance	
Zeeshan Farid	50 m rifle three positions	1132	25	Did not Advance	
Aamer Iqbal	Trap	115	18	Did not Advance	
Farrukh Nadeem	Trap	117	14	Did not Advance	
Aamer Iqbal	Double trap	134	8	Did not Advance	
Farrukh Nadeem	Double trap	133	11	Did not Advance	
Abdul Sattar Ali Satti	Skeet	112	23	Did not Advance	
Usman Chand	Skeet	122	3 Q	21	5

Women

Athlete	Event	Qualification		Final	
Athlete	Event	Points	Rank	Points	Rank
Nadira Raees	10 m air rifle	607.0	37	Did not Advance	
Minhal Sohail	10 m air rifle	605.2	38	Did not Advance	
Nadira Raees	50 m rifle three positions	1125	28	Did not Advance	

Mixed team

Athlete	Event	Qualification		Final	
Athlete	Event	Points	Rank	Points	Rank
Zeeshan Farid; Minhal Sohail	10 m air rifle	807.5	19	Did not Advance	

== Soft tennis ==
Athlete	Event	Group Stage				Quarterfinals	Semifinals	Final	
Athlete	Event	Opposition score	Opposition score	Opposition score	Rank	Opposition score	Opposition score	Opposition score	Rank
Eibad Sarwar Hussain Khan	Men's singles	E Bolortuya (MGL); L 0–4	P Simpatiaji (INA); L 0–4	—N/a	3	Did not Advance			
Muhammad Yahya	Men's singles	H Funemizu (JPN); L 0–4	Kim J-w (KOR); L 0–4	—N/a	3	Did not Advance			
Syeda Eraj Batool Zaidi	Women's singles	N Manalac (PHI); L 0–4	Kim M-h (PRK); L 0–4	—N/a	3	Did not Advance			
Varisha Khan	Women's singles	C Bataa (MGL); L 0–4	D Srirungreang (THA); L 0–4	PL Catindig (PHI); L 0–4	4	Did not Advance			
Muhammad Ahmed Ehtisham; Syeda Eraj Batool Zaidi	Mixed doubles	K Masuda / R Kuroki (JPN); L 0–5	E Bolortuya / N Bulgan (MGL); L 1–5	—N/a	3	Did not Advance			
Muhammad Nauman Aftab; Marium Shahid	Mixed doubles	I Hendrawan / DT Kusrini (INA); L 0–5	Kuo C-c / Kuo C-c (TPE); L 0–5	—N/a	3	Did not Advance			
Muhammad Nauman Aftab; Muhammad Ahmed Ehtisham; Eibad Sarwar Hussain Khan; Muhammad Usama Saeed; Muhammad Yahya	Men's team	South Korea (KOR); L 0–3	Philippines (PHI); L 1–2	Laos (LAO); L 0–3	4	Did not Advance			
Varisha Khan; Marium Shahid; Syeda Eraj Batool Zaidi	Women's team	Indonesia (INA); L 0–3	Japan (JPN); L 0–3	—N/a	3	Did not Advance			

== Sport climbing ==
Speed

Athlete	Event	Qualification		Round of 16	Quarterfinals	Semifinals	Final / BM	
Athlete	Event	Best	Rank	Opposition Time	Opposition Time	Opposition Time	Opposition Time	Rank
Mushahid Hussain	Men's	11.613	25	Did not Advance				
Sajid Aslam	Men's	10.010	24	Did not Advance				

== Squash ==
The Pakistan Squash Federation (PSF) announced eight athletes (4 men's and 4 women's) that participate at the Games.

Singles

Athlete	Event	Round of 32	Round of 16	Quarterfinals	Semifinals	Final	
Athlete	Event	Opposition score	Opposition score	Opposition score	Opposition score	Opposition score	Rank
Muhammad Asim Khan	Men's	N Jivasuwan (THA); W 3–0	I Yuen (MAS); L 0–3	Did not Advance			
Tayyab Aslam	Men's	A K Simha (NEP); W 3–0	S Ghosal (IND); L 1–3	Did not Advance			
Faiza Zafar	Women's	C Yuliana (INA); L 2–3	Did not Advance				
Madina Zafar	Women's	Ahn E-t (KOR); L 0–3	Did not Advance				

Team

Athlete	Event	Group Stage						Semifinal	Final	
Athlete	Event	Opposition Score	Opposition Score	Opposition Score	Opposition Score	Opposition Score	Rank	Opposition Score	Opposition Score	Rank
M Asim Khan; Tayyab Aslam; Amaad Fareed; Israr Ahmad	Men's	Japan (JPN); W 2–1	Nepal (NEP); W 3–0	Philippines (PHI); W 3–0	Hong Kong (HKG); L 0–3	South Korea (KOR); W 3–0	2 Q	Malaysia (MAS); L 0–2	Did not Advance	3rd place, bronze medalist(s)
Madina Zafar; Faiza Zafar; Riffat Khan; Amna Fayyaz	Women's	Malaysia (MAS); L 0–3	South Korea (KOR); L 0–3	Japan (JPN); L 0–3	Philippines (PHI); L 1–2	—N/a	5	Did not Advance		

== Swimming ==
Men

Athlete	Event	Heats		Final	
Athlete	Event	Time	Rank	Time	Rank
Kawas Behram Aga	100 m backstroke	2:22.41	19	Did not Advance	
Kawas Behram Aga	200 m backstroke	1:05.51	25	Did not Advance	
Kawas Behram Aga	50 m butterfly	26.95	34	Did not Advance	
Kawas Behram Aga	100 m butterfly	1:01.16	29	Did not Advance	
Muhammad Yahya Khan	50 m freestyle	25.50	42	Did not Advance	
Muhammad Yahya Khan	100 m freestyle	56.06	39	Did not Advance	
Muhammad Yahya Khan	50 m backstroke	28.79	29	Did not Advance	
Muhammad Yahya Khan	200 m individual medley	2:20.31	18	Did not Advance	
Muhammad Hamza Malik	50 m breaststroke	33.20	33	Did not Advance	
Muhammad Hamza Malik	100 m breaststroke	1:13.33	30	Did not Advance	
Muhammad Hamza Malik	200 m breaststroke	2:40.72	20	Did not Advance	
Syed Muhammad Haseeb Tariq	100 m freestyle	54.09	36	Did not Advance	
Syed Muhammad Haseeb Tariq	50 m backstroke	27.31	24	Did not Advance	
Syed Muhammad Haseeb Tariq	100 m backstroke	59.20	20	Did not Advance	
Syed Muhammad Haseeb Tariq; Kawas Behram Aga; Muhammad Hamza Malik; Muhammad Yahya Khan	4 × 100 m freestyle relay	3:59.48	15	Did not Advance	
Syed Muhammad Haseeb Tariq; Kawas Behram Aga; Muhammad Hamza Malik; Muhammad Yahya Khan	4 × 100 m medley relay	4:10.92	15	Did not Advance	

Women

Athlete	Event	Heats		Final	
Athlete	Event	Time	Rank	Time	Rank
Mishael Aisha Ayub	50 m breaststroke	37.15	23	Did not Advance	
Mishael Aisha Ayub	100 m breaststroke	1:22.59	22	Did not Advance	
Mishael Aisha Ayub	50 m butterfly	32.22	19	Did not Advance	
Mishael Aisha Ayub	100 m butterfly	1:09.61	21	Did not Advance	
Mishael Aisha Ayub	200 m individual medley	2:38.70	16	Did not Advance	
Miraal Zahra Haque	200 m freestyle	2:29.07	22	Did not Advance	
Miraal Zahra Haque	50 m backstroke	34.62	20	Did not Advance	
Miraal Zahra Haque	200 m backstroke	2:39.36	15	Did not Advance	
Miraal Zahra Haque	100 m butterfly	1:17.49	23	Did not Advance	
Bisma Khan	50 m freestyle	28.08	19	Did not Advance	
Bisma Khan	100 m freestyle	1:02.85	21	Did not Advance	
Bisma Khan	50 m backstroke	31.53	17	Did not Advance	
Bisma Khan	100 m backstroke	1:09.93	17	Did not Advance	
Bisma Khan	50 m butterfly	30.02	18	Did not Advance	

Mixed

Athlete	Event	Heats		Final	
Athlete	Event	Time	Rank	Time	Rank
Syed Muhammad Haseeb Tariq; Muhammad Hamza Malik; Mishael Aisha Ayub; Bisma Khan	4 × 100 m mixed medley relay	4:31.25	11	Did not Advance	

== Table tennis ==
Individual

Athlete	Event	Round 1	Round 2	Round of 16	Quarterfinals	Semifinals	Final	
Athlete	Event	Opposition score	Opposition score	Opposition score	Opposition score	Opposition score	Opposition score	Rank
Muhammad Asim Qureshi	Men's singles	MBA Negara (INA); WO	S Kamal (IND); L 0–4	Did not Advance				
Muhammad Rameez	Men's singles	M Abdulhussein (QAT); L 1–4	Did not Advance					
Aisha Iqbal Ansari	Women's singles	A Majdi (QAT); W 4–2	Fang TW (SGP); L 0–4	Did not Advance				
Fatima Khan	Women's singles	I Madurangi (SRI); L 0–4	Did not Advance					
Muhammad Asim Qureshi; Aisha Iqbal Ansari	Mixed doubles	Wang C / Cheong CI (MAC); L 1–3	Did not Advance					
Muhammad Rameez; Fatima Khan	Mixed doubles	Bye	J Ueda / M Maeda (JPN); L 0–3	Did not Advance				

== Taekwondo ==
Pakistan Taekwondo Federation (PWF) will enter seven athletes (4 men's and 3 women's) into the taekwondo competition.

Athlete	Event	Round of 16	Quarterfinals	Semifinals	Repechage	Final	
Athlete	Event	Opposition Result	Opposition Result	Opposition Result	Opposition Result	Opposition Result	Rank
Shahzeb Khan	Men's −58 kg	Enkhboldyn Buyanshagai (MGL); L 11–31	Did not Advance				
Haroon Khan	Men's −63 kg	Aung Kyaw Kyaw (MYA); W 33–0	Ibrahim Zarman (INA); L 21–25	Did not Advance			
Mohammad Iqbal	Men's −68 kg	Bye	Achitkhüügiin Natsagdorj (MGL); L 22-45	Did not Advance			
Syed Zadi Sidra Batool	Women's −49 kg	Bye	Kumudu Wijerathna (SRI); L 14-28	Did not Advance			
Aneila Aysha Afsar	Women's −53 kg	Law Sin Yi (HKG); L 6–12	Did not Advance				
Nimra Wasiq	Women's −57 kg	Xiao (MAC); L 2-16	Did not Advance				

== Tennis ==
Men

Athlete	Event	Round of 64	Round of 32	Round of 16	Quarterfinals	Semifinals	Final	
Athlete	Event	Opposition score	Opposition score	Opposition score	Opposition score	Opposition score	Opposition score	Rank
Aqeel Khan	Singles	M Badrakh (MGL); W 6–1, 6–1	D Istomin (UZB); L 3–6, 1–6	Did not Advance				
Mohammad Abid Ali Khan Akbar	Singles	IA Susanto (INA); W 7–5, 6–1	Lee D-h (KOR); L 4–6, 2–6	Did not Advance				
Mohammad Abid Ali Khan Akbar; Aqeel Khan	Doubles	Bye	Hsieh C-p / Yang T-h (TPE); L 3–6, 1–6	Did not Advance				
Muhammad Abid; Muzammil Murtaza	Doubles	Bye	F Dustov / D Istomin (UZB); L 6–7^{(5–7)}, 2–6	Did not Advance				

Women

Athlete	Event	Round of 64	Round of 32	Round of 16	Quarterfinals	Semifinals	Final	
Athlete	Event	Opposition score	Opposition score	Opposition score	Opposition score	Opposition score	Opposition score	Rank
Sara Mansoor	Singles	Bye	Liang E-s (TPE); L 1–6, 0–6	Did not Advance				
Ushna Suhail	Singles	Bye	Chang K-c (TPE); L 3–6, 1–6	Did not Advance				
Sara Mansoor; Ushna Suhail	Doubles	—N/a	J Budiman / D Nur Haliza (INA); L 3–6, 6–7^{(4–7)}	Did not Advance				
Sarah Mahboob Khan; Meheq Khokar	Doubles	—N/a	A Raina / P Thombare (IND); L 0–6, 0–6	Did not Advance				

Mixed

Athlete	Event	Round of 64	Round of 32	Round of 16	Quarterfinals	Semifinals	Final	
Athlete	Event	Opposition score	Opposition score	Opposition score	Opposition score	Opposition score	Opposition score	Rank
Sarah Mahboob Khan; Muzammil Murtaza	Doubles	Bye	A Sutjiadi / C Rungkat (INA); L 3–6, 2–6	Did not Advance				
Ushna Suhail; Muhammad Abid	Doubles	Bye	L Kumkhum / S Ratiwatana (THA); L 2–6, 0–6	Did not Advance				

== Volleyball ==
Pakistan men's team were drawn in pool B.

=== Indoor volleyball ===
Team	Event	Group Stage		Playoffs	Quarterfinals / Pl.	Semifinals / Pl.	Final / BM / Pl.	
Team	Event	Oppositions scores	Rank	Opposition score	Opposition score	Opposition score	Opposition score	Rank
Pakistan men's	Men's tournament	Mongolia: W 3–0; Iran: L 0–3	2 Q	South Korea; L 0–3	India; W 3–1	China; W 3–2	Thailand; L 1–3	8

==== Men's tournament ====
Team roster

The following is the Pakistan roster in the men's volleyball tournament of the 2018 Asian Games.

Head coach: Hamid Movahedi

No.	Name	Date of birth	Height	Weight	Spike	Block	Club
1	Mohib Rasool (c)	24 December 1989	1.97 m (6 ft 6 in)	85 kg (187 lb)	336 cm (132 in)	333 cm (131 in)	(Pakistan) Wapda
2	Muneer Khan	24 December 1987	1.95 m (6 ft 5 in)	80 kg (180 lb)	312 cm (123 in)	310 cm (120 in)	(Pakistan) Wapda
3	Muhammad Waseem	1 May 1998	1.97 m (6 ft 6 in)	85 kg (187 lb)	331 cm (130 in)	325 cm (128 in)	(Pakistan) Wapda
5	Asif Nadeem Sr.	25 December 1986	1.89 m (6 ft 2 in)	86 kg (190 lb)	320 cm (130 in)	304 cm (120 in)	(Pakistan) Wapda
6	Sheraz	27 October 1993	1.92 m (6 ft 4 in)	81 kg (179 lb)	310 cm (120 in)	310 cm (120 in)	(Pakistan) Wapda
7	Mubashir Raza	1 January 1992	1.89 m (6 ft 2 in)	84 kg (185 lb)	368 cm (145 in)	311 cm (122 in)	(Pakistan) Wapda
8	Aimal Khan	10 August 1990	1.90 m (6 ft 3 in)	80 kg (180 lb)	340 cm (130 in)	320 cm (130 in)	(Pakistan) Wapda
10	Fahad Raza	7 March 1997	1.93 m (6 ft 4 in)	86 kg (190 lb)	325 cm (128 in)	320 cm (130 in)	(Pakistan) Wapda
11	Muhammad Idrees	25 December 1994	1.95 m (6 ft 5 in)	88 kg (194 lb)	335 cm (132 in)	333 cm (131 in)	(Pakistan) Wapda
12	Nasir Ali	6 July 1994	1.65 m (5 ft 5 in)	64 kg (141 lb)	305 cm (120 in)	285 cm (112 in)	(Pakistan) Wapda
13	Muhammad Kashif Naveed	1 January 1994	1.88 m (6 ft 2 in)	79 kg (174 lb)	320 cm (130 in)	305 cm (120 in)	(Pakistan) Wapda
15	Murad Jehan	22 April 1994	1.92 m (6 ft 4 in)	90 kg (200 lb)	350 cm (140 in)	322 cm (127 in)	(Pakistan) Wapda

Pool B

Pos	Team	Pld	W	L	Pts	SW	SL	SR	SPW	SPL	SPR	Qualification
1	Iran	2	2	0	6	6	0	MAX	158	122	1.295	Classification for 1–12
2	Pakistan	2	1	1	3	3	3	1.000	140	132	1.061	Classification for 1–12
3	Mongolia	2	0	2	0	0	6	0.000	106	150	0.707	Classification for 13–20

Source: OCA

Date	Time		Score		Set 1	Set 2	Set 3	Set 4	Set 5	Total	Report
20 Aug	12:30	Pakistan	3–0	Mongolia	25–16	25–19	25–14			75–49	Report
22 Aug	16:30	Iran	3–0	Pakistan	25–16	25–18	33–31			83–65	Report
26 Aug	10:00	South Korea	3–0	Pakistan	25–19	25–22	25–17			75–58	Report
28 Aug	12:30	India	1–3	Pakistan	25–21	21–25	21–25	23–25		90–96	Report
30 Aug	12:30	China	2–3	Pakistan	25–17	26–28	30–28	19–25	16–18	116–116	Report
01 Sep	16:30	Thailand	3–1	Pakistan	20–25	25–23	28–26	25–21		98–95	Report

== Weightlifting ==
Pakistan will compete with four men's weightlifters at the Games.

Men

Athlete	Event	Snatch		Clean & Jerk		Total	Rank
Athlete	Event	Result	Rank	Result	Rank	Total	Rank
Talha Talib	−62 kg	133	4	154	7	287	7
Haider Ali	−77 kg	135	15	168	13	303	13
Jamil Akhter	−105 kg	135	7	158	7	293	7
Muhammad Nooh Dastgir Butt	+105 kg	170	7	235	5	405	5

== Wrestling ==
Pakistan Wrestling Federation (PWF) have prepared five wrestler to compete at the Games. Two times Commonwealth gold medallist Muhammad Inam opted to skip his participation due to knee injury. PWF finally decide to send four wrestler.

Key:

- F – Victory by fall.
- PP – Decision by points – the loser with technical points.
- PO – Decision by points – the loser without technical points.
- ST – Great superiority – the loser without technical points and a margin of victory of at least 8 (Greco-Roman) or 10 (freestyle) points.

Men's freestyle

Athlete	Event	Qualification	Round of 16	Quarterfinal	Semifinal	Repechage 1	Repechage 2	Final / BM	
Athlete	Event	Opposition Result	Opposition Result	Opposition Result	Opposition Result	Opposition Result	Opposition Result	Opposition Result	Rank
Muhammad Bilal	−57 kg	Shavkatov (UZB); L 2–7	Did not Advance						13
Mudassar Hussain	−65 kg	Takatani (JPN); L 0–10	Did not Advance						11
Abdul Rehman	−74 kg	Bye	Dzhalilov (TJK); L 0–10	Did not Advance					18
Tayyab Raza	−125 kg	—N/a	Hashemi (AFG); W 11^{F}–2	Zhiwei (CHN); L 0–10	Did not Advance		—N/a	Nam (KOR); L 0–9	5

== Wushu ==
Taolu

Athlete	Event	Event 1		Event 2		Total	Rank
Athlete	Event	Result	Rank	Result	Rank	Total	Rank
Muhammad Abdul Rehma	Men's changquan	6.70	17	—N/a		6.70	17
Muhammad Dawood	Men's nanquan and nangun	6.65	23	6.37	23	13.02	23
Samreen Altaf	Women's taijiquan and taijijian	6.90	16	6.62	16	13.52	16

Sanda

Athlete	Event	Round of 32	Round of 16	Quarterfinal	Semifinal	Final	
Athlete	Event	Opposition Score	Opposition Score	Opposition Score	Opposition Score	Opposition Score	Rank
Zahoor Ahmed	Men's –56 kg	Bye	Hong M-j (KOR); L 0–2	Did not Advance			
Abdul Khaliq	Men's –60 kg	Bye	Jo S-h (KOR); L 0–2	Did not Advance			
Maratab Ali Shah	men's –65 kg	—N/a	K Hotak (AFG); L 0–2	Did not Advance			
Maaz Khan	Men's –70 kg	—N/a	E B Gebrayel (LBN); W 0–0 ^{TV}	Shi ZW (CHN); L 0–2	Did not Advance		
Zarina Rafique	Women's –52 kg	—N/a	Bye	Chen W-t (TPE); L 0–2	Did not Advance		
Mubashra Akhtar	Women's –60 kg	—N/a	Bye	R Naorem (IND); L 0–2	Did not Advance		

Key: * TV – Technical victory.

== Withdrawn Athletes ==
The following is a list of athletes originally set to participate in the Games, but due to financial constrains they were not sent.

=== Archery ===
The following athletes were withdrawn from the original squad:

1. Aqsa Nawaz
2. Umm-e-Zahra
3. Sumbal Zubair

=== Judo ===
The following 5 athletes were part of the original squad:

1. Babar Hussain in Men's 66 kg
2. Nadeem Akram in Men's 73 kg
3. Humaira Ashiq in Women's 48 kg
4. Maryam Jabbar in Women's 52 kg
5. Amina Toyoda in Women's 57 kg

== See also ==
- Pakistan at the 2018 Asian Para Games
