= Shooting at the 2018 Asian Games – Mixed 10 metre air rifle team =

2018 Asian Games competition

Mixed 10 metre air rifle team at the 2018 Asian Games
- Venue: Jakabaring Shooting Range
- Dates: 19 August 2018
- Competitors: 44 from 22 nations

Medalists
gold medal	Lu Shao-chuan; Lin Ying-shin	Chinese Taipei
silver medal	Yang Haoran; Zhao Ruozhu	China
bronze medal	Ravi Kumar; Apurvi Chandela	India

The mixed 10 metre air rifle team competition at the 2018 Asian Games in Jakarta, Indonesia took place on 19 August at the Jakabaring International Shooting Range.

== Schedule ==
All times are Western Indonesia Time (UTC+07:00)

Date	Time	Event
Sunday, 19 August 2018	09:00	Qualification
Sunday, 19 August 2018	13:00	Final

== Records ==
Prior to this competition, the existing world, Asian and Games records were as follows.

Qualification
World Record	China	842.0	Fort Benning, United States	13 May 2018
Asian Record	China	842.0	Fort Benning, United States	13 May 2018
Games Record	—	—	—	—
Final
World Record	China	502.0	Guadalajara, Mexico	5 March 2018
Asian Record	China	502.0	Guadalajara, Mexico	5 March 2018
Games Record	—	—	—	—

== Results ==
=== Qualification ===
Rank	Team	Series				Total	Notes
Rank	Team	1	2	3	4	Total	Notes
1	South Korea (KOR)	207.5	209.0	209.2	211.0	836.7	GR
	Kim Hyeon-jun	104.7	104.2	104.0	105.0	417.9	
	Jung Eun-hea	102.8	104.8	105.2	106.0	418.8	
2	India (IND)	208.6	208.7	206.7	211.3	835.3	
	Ravi Kumar	103.9	104.9	104.9	106.3	420.0	
	Apurvi Chandela	104.7	103.8	101.8	105.0	415.3	
3	Mongolia (MGL)	206.6	209.7	208.6	207.2	832.1	
	Nyantain Bayaraa	102.6	104.8	103.9	103.1	414.4	
	Gankhuyagiin Nandinzayaa	104.0	104.9	104.7	104.1	417.7	
4	China (CHN)	208.9	207.4	206.5	208.3	831.1	
	Yang Haoran	103.1	103.3	103.1	104.7	414.2	
	Zhao Ruozhu	105.8	104.1	103.4	103.6	416.9	
5	Chinese Taipei (TPE)	206.5	207.5	209.1	206.7	829.8	
	Lu Shao-chuan	102.0	103.4	103.6	102.9	411.9	
	Lin Ying-shin	104.5	104.1	105.5	103.8	417.9	
6	Singapore (SGP)	207.3	207.8	208.5	206.1	829.7	
	Irwan Abdul Rahman	103.0	103.3	102.9	102.6	411.8	
	Martina Veloso	104.3	104.5	105.6	103.5	417.9	
7	Iran (IRI)	203.3	208.3	209.3	207.5	828.4	
	Amir Mohammad Nekounam	101.8	104.9	105.2	103.0	414.9	
	Najmeh Khedmati	101.5	103.4	104.1	104.5	413.5	
8	Japan (JPN)	205.5	206.8	206.2	204.8	823.3	
	Atsushi Shimada	102.6	102.1	104.0	101.8	410.5	
	Ayano Shimizu	102.9	104.7	102.2	103.0	412.8	
9	Indonesia (INA)	202.6	205.0	206.8	206.7	821.1	
	Muhammad Naufal Mahardika	101.9	101.5	103.5	103.2	410.1	
	Monica Daryanti	100.7	103.5	103.3	103.5	411.0	
10	Malaysia (MAS)	199.9	204.5	208.0	208.1	820.5	
	Lutfi Othman	98.6	100.8	104.1	103.9	407.4	
	Nur Izazi Rosli	101.3	103.7	103.9	104.2	413.1	
11	Kazakhstan (KAZ)	207.9	203.1	203.9	203.8	818.7	
	Alexey Kleimyonov	103.9	102.6	103.4	101.7	411.6	
	Violetta Starostina	104.0	100.5	100.5	102.1	407.1	
12	Thailand (THA)	204.9	205.6	202.0	203.5	816.0	
	Pongsaton Panyatong	102.8	103.8	102.0	102.2	410.8	
	Thanyalak Chotphibunsin	102.1	101.8	100.0	101.3	405.2	
13	Bangladesh (BAN)	202.4	203.7	204.8	204.0	814.9	
	Arnab Sharar	103.9	101.3	103.1	101.6	409.9	
	Sayeda Atkia Hasan	98.5	102.4	101.7	102.4	405.0	
14	Uzbekistan (UZB)	201.3	205.6	201.5	205.3	813.7	
	Vadim Skorovarov	103.6	104.4	99.8	104.9	412.7	
	Zaynab Pardabaeva	97.7	101.2	101.7	100.4	401.0	
15	Tajikistan (TJK)	202.5	202.3	203.6	204.6	813.0	
	Todzhiddin Valiev	102.1	99.5	100.3	100.5	402.4	
	Malika Lagutenko	100.4	102.8	103.3	104.1	410.6	
16	Oman (OMA)	200.0	201.7	206.2	203.3	811.2	
	Issam Al-Balushi	99.2	99.0	103.1	101.7	403.0	
	Amina Al-Tarshi	100.8	102.7	103.1	101.6	408.2	
17	United Arab Emirates (UAE)	199.1	202.3	202.0	206.3	809.7	
	Ahmed Al-Hefeiti	100.2	100.9	103.0	104.2	408.3	
	Marwa Jawhar Mahboob	98.9	101.4	99.0	102.1	401.4	
18	North Korea (PRK)	202.9	203.2	200.7	202.9	809.7	
	Ryong Song-gang	101.4	101.2	99.4	101.2	403.2	
	Ri Un-gyong	101.5	102.0	101.3	101.7	406.5	
19	Pakistan (PAK)	202.6	200.3	201.2	203.4	807.5	
	Zeeshan Farid	101.3	101.9	101.2	103.3	407.7	
	Minhal Sohail	101.3	98.4	100.0	100.1	399.8	
20	Vietnam (VIE)	200.3	199.6	202.8	203.7	806.4	
	Nguyễn Duy Hoàng	98.8	102.3	101.4	100.7	403.2	
	Ai Iwaki	101.5	97.3	101.4	103.0	403.2	
21	Qatar (QAT)	198.4	203.6	200.4	198.3	800.7	
	Ali Al-Muhannadi	101.2	102.2	100.8	100.0	404.2	
	Matara Al-Aseiri	97.2	101.4	99.6	98.3	396.5	
22	Nepal (NEP)	186.0	197.3	199.8	193.3	776.4	
	Sushe Chaudhary	86.8	94.3	98.6	93.2	372.9	
	Sushmita Nepal	99.2	103.0	101.2	100.1	403.5	

=== Final ===
Rank	Team	1st stage			2nd stage – Elimination				S-off	Notes
Rank	Team	1	2	3	1	2	3	4	S-off	Notes
1st place, gold medalist(s)	Chinese Taipei (TPE); Lu Shao-chuan; Lin Ying-shin	102.7	205.9	310.2	350.8	390.9	432.4	494.1		GR
2nd place, silver medalist(s)	China (CHN); Yang Haoran; Zhao Ruozhu	101.2	204.1	306.9	348.2	390.2	431.3	492.5		
3rd place, bronze medalist(s)	India (IND); Ravi Kumar; Apurvi Chandela	102.9	205.5	308.5	349.0	390.2	429.9			
4	South Korea (KOR); Kim Hyeon-jun; Jung Eun-hea	103.4	205.0	307.4	349.2	389.4				
5	Mongolia (MGL); Nyantain Bayaraa; Gankhuyagiin Nandinzayaa	100.2	202.5	306.5	346.6					
