= Gonghe =

Gonghe may refer to:

- Gonghe Regency, a regency that ruled the Chinese Zhou dynasty from 841 to 828 BC
- Gonghe County (共和县), of Hainan Tibetan Autonomous Prefecture, Qinghai Province, China
- Gonghe, Qinghai (共和镇), a town in Huangzhong District, Xining, Qinghai, China
- Abbreviation of 工業合作社 (pinyin: Gōngyè Hézuòshè), meaning Chinese Industrial Cooperatives
