= Shooting at the 2018 Asian Games – Men's 300 metre standard rifle =

Men's 300 metre standard rifle at the 2018 Asian Games
- Venue: Jakabaring Shooting Range
- Dates: 24 August 2018
- Competitors: 13 from 7 nations

Medalists
| gold medal | Choi Young-jeon | South Korea |
| silver medal | Hussain Al-Harbi | Saudi Arabia |
| bronze medal | Lee Won-gyu | South Korea |

The men's 300 metre standard rifle event at the 2018 Asian Games in Palembang, Indonesia took place on 24 August at the Jakabaring International Shooting Range.

== Schedule ==
All times are Western Indonesia Time (UTC+07:00)

| Date | Time | Event |
|---|---|---|
| Friday, 24 August 2018 | 09:00 | Final |

== Records ==
Prior to this competition, the existing world, Asian and Games records were as follows.

| World Record | Cyril Graff (FRA) | 589 | Granada, Spain | 17 September 2014 |
| Asian Record | Rahul Poonia (IND) | 573 | Granada, Spain | 17 September 2014 |
| Games Record | — | — | — | — |

== Results ==
| Rank | Athlete | Kneeling | | Prone | | Standing | | Total | Xs | Notes |
| Rank | Athlete | 1 | 2 | 1 | 2 | 1 | 2 | Total | Xs | Notes |
|---|---|---|---|---|---|---|---|---|---|---|
| 1st place, gold medalist(s) | Choi Young-jeon (KOR) | 98 | 98 | 96 | 93 | 92 | 92 | 569 | 13 | GR |
| 2nd place, silver medalist(s) | Hussain Al-Harbi (KSA) | 97 | 93 | 99 | 95 | 93 | 91 | 568 | 18 | |
| 3rd place, bronze medalist(s) | Lee Won-gyu (KOR) | 94 | 96 | 97 | 97 | 91 | 88 | 563 | 16 | |
| 4 | Harjinder Singh (IND) | 91 | 91 | 100 | 96 | 92 | 90 | 560 | 7 | |
| 5 | Amit Kumar (IND) | 89 | 95 | 94 | 96 | 93 | 92 | 559 | 12 | |
| 6 | Cao Bo (CHN) | 93 | 95 | 96 | 95 | 89 | 91 | 559 | 12 | |
| 7 | Irawan Saputra (INA) | 91 | 90 | 96 | 97 | 92 | 92 | 558 | 9 | |
| 8 | Sun Jian (CHN) | 90 | 94 | 98 | 88 | 94 | 93 | 557 | 13 | |
| 9 | Abdulrahman Al-Juhaydili (KSA) | 89 | 95 | 98 | 98 | 91 | 86 | 557 | 11 | |
| 10 | Farid Prayuda (INA) | 91 | 96 | 95 | 99 | 83 | 85 | 549 | 10 | |
| 11 | Mahmood Haji (BRN) | 92 | 93 | 89 | 90 | 90 | 83 | 537 | 8 | |
| 12 | Yousuf Al-Abri (OMA) | 93 | 87 | 90 | 90 | 83 | 83 | 526 | 4 | |
| 13 | Salyem Al-Malki (OMA) | 83 | 89 | 93 | 84 | 82 | 86 | 517 | 4 | |
