= Shooting at the 2018 Asian Games – Men's 10 metre air rifle =

2018 Asian Games competition

Men's 10 metre air rifle at the 2018 Asian Games
- Venue: Jakabaring Shooting Range
- Dates: 20 August 2018
- Competitors: 44 from 27 nations

Medalists
gold medal	Yang Haoran	China
silver medal	Deepak Kumar	India
bronze medal	Lu Shao-chuan	Chinese Taipei

The men's 10 metre air rifle event at the 2018 Asian Games in Palembang, Indonesia took place on 20 August at the Jakabaring International Shooting Range.

== Schedule ==
All times are Western Indonesia Time (UTC+07:00)

Date	Time	Event
Monday, 20 August 2018	08:30	Qualification
Monday, 20 August 2018	10:45	Final

== Records ==
Prior to this competition, the existing world, Asian and Games records were as follows.

Qualification
World Record	Péter Sidi (HUN)	633.5	Munich, Germany	25 May 2013
Asian Record	Yang Haoran (CHN)	632.9	Changwon, South Korea	22 April 2018
Games Record	Cao Yifei (CHN)	630.7	Incheon, South Korea	23 September 2014
Final
World Record	Alexander Dryagin (RUS)	251.2	Changwon, South Korea	22 April 2018
Asian Record	Yao Yuncong (CHN)	250.9	Qabala, Azerbaijan	8 June 2017
Games Record	—	—	—	—

== Results ==
=== Qualification ===
Rank	Athlete	Series						Total	Notes
Rank	Athlete	1	2	3	4	5	6	Total	Notes
1	Yang Haoran (CHN)	106.4	105.7	106.4	104.4	105.0	105.0	632.9	GR
2	Song Soo-joo (KOR)	104.8	105.5	105.1	104.8	104.7	104.8	629.7	
3	Hui Zicheng (CHN)	104.4	104.6	104.6	104.3	103.6	105.7	627.2	
4	Ravi Kumar (IND)	104.7	103.1	105.0	105.0	104.8	104.1	626.7	
5	Deepak Kumar (IND)	103.7	104.1	102.3	105.8	105.5	104.9	626.3	
6	Amir Mohammad Nekounam (IRI)	103.0	104.3	105.2	104.6	104.4	104.2	625.7	
7	Lu Shao-chuan (TPE)	102.2	105.4	105.0	105.3	102.8	104.5	625.2	
8	Vadim Skorovarov (UZB)	104.5	102.4	104.1	104.6	105.0	103.9	624.5	
9	Mahmood Haji (BRN)	104.2	103.6	104.2	104.6	103.9	103.1	623.6	
10	Kim Hyeon-jun (KOR)	104.8	104.2	103.1	104.7	103.3	103.4	623.5	
11	Naoya Okada (JPN)	103.6	104.3	103.1	103.7	103.1	105.5	623.3	
12	Amir Siavash Zolfagharian (IRI)	104.6	103.5	105.7	103.5	102.4	103.4	623.1	
13	Irwan Abdul Rahman (SGP)	104.6	104.1	104.4	101.1	103.2	104.7	622.1	
14	Pongsaton Panyatong (THA)	104.1	103.6	102.8	103.0	103.3	104.5	621.3	
15	Atsushi Shimada (JPN)	103.1	102.8	102.6	104.7	105.4	102.4	621.0	
16	Napis Tortungpanich (THA)	102.6	103.1	103.8	102.8	102.6	104.5	619.4	
17	Jayson Valdez (PHI)	102.2	105.4	102.3	103.7	102.7	102.3	618.6	
18	Yuriy Yurkov (KAZ)	101.9	102.1	103.4	103.9	104.5	102.7	618.5	
19	Abdullah Hel Baki (BAN)	103.0	104.2	104.6	102.6	103.9	100.1	618.4	
20	Husain Abduljabbar (BRN)	103.3	101.1	102.7	102.7	104.1	103.8	617.7	
21	Mesfer Al-Ammari (KSA)	102.0	103.2	103.4	100.6	104.0	104.1	617.3	
22	Fathur Gustafian (INA)	103.0	102.5	103.9	102.3	101.2	104.3	617.2	
23	Muhammad Naufal Mahardika (INA)	102.5	102.6	101.8	103.2	103.2	103.9	617.2	
24	Hussain Al-Harbi (KSA)	100.5	105.2	102.2	101.8	103.4	103.7	616.8	
25	Ghufran Adil (PAK)	104.7	103.7	102.5	103.0	100.0	102.9	616.8	
26	Sng Jian Hui (SGP)	102.5	102.7	102.6	102.8	103.1	102.9	616.6	
27	Alexey Kleimyonov (KAZ)	104.6	102.8	101.2	103.8	102.0	102.0	616.4	
28	Lutfi Othman (MAS)	102.0	102.4	103.0	101.9	102.5	102.5	614.3	
29	Risalatul Islam (BAN)	100.0	101.7	102.7	104.2	103.3	102.4	614.3	
30	Nguyễn Duy Hoàng (VIE)	102.6	101.0	101.8	103.2	102.3	101.7	612.6	
31	Zeeshan Farid (PAK)	99.4	104.3	102.0	100.4	102.6	102.4	611.1	
32	Issam Al-Balushi (OMA)	103.3	102.0	102.7	102.4	99.5	101.2	611.1	
33	Nguyễn Thành Nam (VIE)	101.7	100.1	103.0	103.0	99.4	103.6	610.8	
34	Todzhiddin Valiev (TJK)	101.1	100.8	101.0	102.1	104.2	100.8	610.0	
35	Ahmed Mohsen Al-Ali (QAT)	100.1	102.4	101.0	101.9	102.7	101.8	609.9	
36	Ibrahim Khalil (UAE)	101.3	100.7	102.5	102.7	103.1	98.4	608.7	
37	Ahmed Al-Hefeiti (UAE)	102.0	102.3	102.7	100.7	101.8	98.7	608.2	
38	Ryong Song-gang (PRK)	99.9	100.9	101.0	101.0	102.9	101.0	606.7	
39	Nyantain Bayaraa (MGL)	101.8	100.6	102.6	100.5	98.1	100.4	604.0	
40	Ali Al-Muhannadi (QAT)	99.1	101.5	103.1	95.9	102.9	101.3	603.8	
41	Mohamed Abdulla (MDV)	98.2	102.0	101.8	99.6	96.8	96.8	595.2	
42	Sushe Chaudhary (NEP)	94.7	94.7	96.8	96.1	98.9	99.8	581.0	
43	Mohamed Yaaniu Ahmed (MDV)	94.8	100.0	95.6	89.2	91.2	92.4	563.2	
44	Nelson da Silva (TLS)	79.5	78.1	76.8	78.5	80.4	84.0	477.3	

=== Final ===
Rank	Athlete	1st stage		2nd stage – Elimination							S-off	Notes
Rank	Athlete	1	2	1	2	3	4	5	6	7	S-off	Notes
1st place, gold medalist(s)	Yang Haoran (CHN)	52.7	104.4	125.4	145.9	166.6	186.7	207.9	228.4	249.1		GR
2nd place, silver medalist(s)	Deepak Kumar (IND)	51.6	101.6	122.2	143.3	164.3	185.3	206.1	226.9	247.7		
3rd place, bronze medalist(s)	Lu Shao-chuan (TPE)	52.3	103.8	124.9	145.7	166.4	186.4	206.7	226.8			
4	Ravi Kumar (IND)	52.0	103.3	123.6	144.1	164.7	184.5	205.2				
5	Song Soo-joo (KOR)	50.2	102.5	123.3	144.1	165.0	184.4					
6	Hui Zicheng (CHN)	51.0	101.2	121.5	143.0	163.0						
7	Amir Mohammad Nekounam (IRI)	51.3	101.2	121.9	141.4							
8	Vadim Skorovarov (UZB)	46.9	99.0	119.9								
