= Qunjia Township, Qinghai =

Kyunggya Tibetan Township 群加藏族乡 ཁྱུང་རྒྱ་བོད་རིགས་ཞང་། Qunjia, Qonghjja
- Ethnic township
- Location in Qinghai
- Coordinates: 36°15′33″N 101°41′24″E
- Country: China
- Province: Qinghai
- Prefecture-level city: Xining
- District: Huangzhong

Area
  - Total: 98.29 km^{2} (37.95 sq mi)

Population (2010)
  - Total: 2,151
  - Density: 21.88/km^{2} (56.68/sq mi)
- Time zone: UTC+8 (China Standard)
- Local dialing code: 971

Kyunggya Tibetan Township (Tibetan: ཁྱུང་རྒྱ་བོད་རིགས་ཞང་།, Chinese: 群加藏族乡) or Qunjia Township, is an ethnic township in Huangzhong District, Xining, Qinghai, China. In 2010, Qunjia Township had a total population of 2,151: 1,074 males and 1,077 females: 471 aged under 14, 1,529 aged between 15 and 65 and 151 aged over 65.
