= Muneer Khan =

Indian scientist

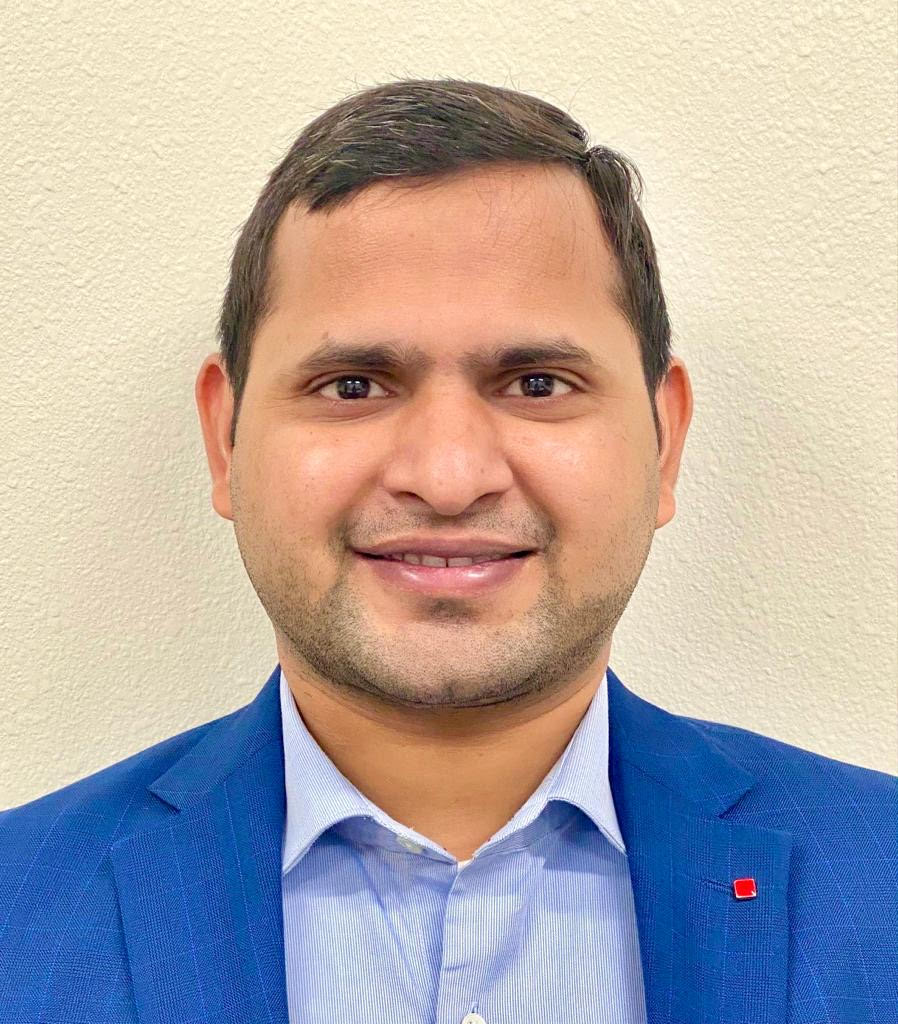
- Born: July 1996 (age 30); Gauriya, Lakhimpur Kheri, Uttar Pradesh, India
- Citizenship: Indian
- Education: Birla Institute of Applied Sciences (BTech), Columbia University (MS)
- Occupations: Research Scientist, Entrepreneur

Muneer Khan (born July 1996) is an Indian scientist and entrepreneur. He is the founder and CEO of Cadre Tech & ITTD Academy and an applied scientist at Harvard University. Khan received recognition for his work in Sensor Technologies and agricultural technology and was awarded the Young Scientist Award by the Government of India, in 2024.

== Early life and education ==
Khan was born in July 1996 in Gauriya, Lakhimpur Kheri, Uttar Pradesh, India. He is the youngest of eight siblings and was raised by his mother after his father died when Khan was just a year old. He completed his schooling at City Montessori Inter College, Lakhimpur Kheri, and later earned a Bachelor of Technology degree in Electronics and Communications Engineering from the Birla Institute of Applied Sciences in 2019. Later, he completed his master of science in electrical engineering from Columbia University in 2022.

== Career ==
He began his career as a research associate at the Uttarakhand Science Education & Research Centre from 2018 to 2019, where he developed an RF/Zigbee-based wireless communication system for real-time monitoring of soil environments. His responsibilities included circuit design and the implementation of wireless communication protocols.

In 2019, he worked as a research intern at Tomsk State University of Control Systems and Microelectronics, contributing to a project on designing a wideband power amplifier using GaN HEMT technology. During this time, he developed and tested the design using simulation tools like ADS and Cadence Virtuoso and 5G app.

Between 2019 and 2021, Khan served as a research associate at the School of Computer Science & Information Technology. He led a team in the development of an IoT-based soil fertility measuring device, collaborating with three research organizations to emphasize hardware integration of sensors and power storage technologies.

In 2021, he founded ITTD in Dehradun, Uttarakhand, focusing on teaching young graduates and professionals through online education. He initiated training programs through web-based distance learning and promoted education with webinars, e-workshops, and web conclaves. In the same year, Khan was selected by the Government of India for career counseling of students in the Vidyanjali program.

In 2022, Khan became a research assistant at Columbia University’s Laboratory for Unconventional Electronics (CLUE). In this role, he developed sensor interfacing circuitry for volatile organic compound (VOC) gas sensors based on IoT technology, designed a system for the simultaneous operation of 16 sensors with wireless data transmission, and led a team to create the Netlist and PCB layout using Orcad Capture. In the following year, Khan founded the technology company Cadre Tech, where he has been serving as its CEO since. At Cadre Tech, he has developed VisionPro AI eyeglasses for visually impaired individuals.

In addition, he has been on short-term internships at the XLIM Laboratory (University of Limoges), CERN Laboratory (Geneva, Switzerland), and INMAS (Defence Research and Development Organization, DRDO), focusing on RF systems, IoT, and embedded systems, and power amplifiers. Throughout his career, Khan has received several awards for his scientific pursuits, including the Young Scientist Award by the Government of India in 2024 for his invention of the soil monitoring device. The award was given by the former chief justice of India, P. Sathasivam, and the minister of Road Transport and Highways of India, Nitin Gadkari, in the presence of the chief minister of Maharashtra, Eknath Shinde, and the Union Cabinet Minister of Agriculture, Shivraj Singh Chauhan. Khan has developed his flagship product VisionPro- AI glasses for Visually Impaired People has been unveiled for public demonstration at IIT Bombay in December 2024

== Innovations ==
- Soil Monitoring Devices (Patent: 496211).
- AI-Enabled Glasses for the Visually Impaired (VisionPro).

== Awards and honors ==
- Young Scientist Award (IGNITE INDIA, presented by the former president of India APJ Abdul Kalam, Jan 2013)
- Yuva Ratna Award (Govt. of Uttar Pradesh, Feb 2014)
- Gyan Scholar Award (NIT Kerala, 2016)
- Dr. Ezaz Hasan Khan Memorial Award (IMA Bareilly, Nov 2018)
- International Emerging Scientist Award (11th International Scientist Awards on Engineering, Science and Medicine, Kolkata, Oct 2020)
- Best Project Award (Columbia University EECS E4764, Dec 2021)
- Young Scientist Award (India, July 2024)
- Young Alumni Award 2025.
- Engineering for Humanity Award 2025.
- Young Innovator Award 2025.

== Books ==
- Advancing Cybersecurity in Smart Factories Through Autonomous Robotic Defenses.
- Future Frontiers Tech Careers.
