= Xipu, Qinghai =

Xipu 西堡镇
- Town
- Xipuzhen
- Location in Qinghai
- Coordinates: 36°34′0″N 101°36′44″E
- Country: China
- Province: Qinghai
- Prefecture-level city: Xining
- District: Huangzhong

Area
  - Total: 95.80 km^{2} (36.99 sq mi)

Population (2010)
  - Total: 23,131
  - Density: 241.5/km^{2} (625.4/sq mi)
- Time zone: UTC+8 (China Standard)
- Local dialing code: 971

Xipu (Chinese: 西堡镇) or Xibao is a town in Huangzhong District, Xining, Qinghai, China. In 2010, Xipu had a total population of 23,131: 11,921 males and 11,210 females: 4,575 aged under 14, 16,952 aged between 15 and 65 and 1,604 aged over 65.
