= Kim Mo-se =

South Korean sports shooter

Personal information
- Nationality: South Korean
- Born: 30 November 1998 (age 27)

Sport
- Sport: Sports shooting
Medal record
Men's shooting
Representing South Korea
Asian Airgun Championships
Gold medal – first place	2019 Taoyuan	10 m air pistol
Silver medal – second place	2019 Taoyuan	10 m air pistol team
Silver medal – second place	2019 Taoyuan	10 m air pistol mixed team

Kim Mo-se (Korean: 김모세, born 30 November 1998) is a South Korean sports shooter. He competed in the men's 10 metre air pistol event at the 2020 Summer Olympics.
