= Shangxinzhuang, Qinghai =

Shangxinzhuang 上新庄镇
- Town
- Shangxinzhuang
- Location in Qinghai
- Coordinates: 36°25′44″N 101°35′47″E
- Country: China
- Province: Qinghai
- Prefecture-level city: Xining
- District: Huangzhong

Area
  - Total: 221.6 km^{2} (85.6 sq mi)

Population (2010)
  - Total: 32,437
  - Density: 146.4/km^{2} (379.1/sq mi)
- Time zone: UTC+8 (China Standard)
- Local dialing code: 971

Shangxinzhuang (Chinese: 上新庄镇) is a town in Huangzhong District, Xining, Qinghai, China. In 2010, Shangxinzhuang had a total population of 32,437: 16,859 males and 15,578 females: 7,523 aged under 14, 23,190 aged between 15 and 65 and 1,724 aged over 65.
