= Tianjiazhai =

Tianjiazhai 田家寨镇
- Town
- Tianjiazhaizhen
- Location in Qinghai
- Coordinates: 36°27′11″N 101°47′49″E
- Country: China
- Province: Qinghai
- Prefecture-level city: Xining
- District: Huangzhong

Area
  - Total: 316.5 km^{2} (122.2 sq mi)

Population (2010)
  - Total: 38,229
  - Density: 120.8/km^{2} (312.8/sq mi)
- Time zone: UTC+8 (China Standard)
- Local dialing code: 971

Tianjiazhai (Chinese: 田家寨镇) is a town in Huangzhong District, Xining, Qinghai, China. In 2010, Tianjiazhai had a total population of 38,229: 20,272 males and 17,957 females: 8,042 aged under 14, 27,540 aged between 15 and 65, and 2,647 aged over 65.
