= Dacai Township, Qinghai =

Dacai Hui Ethnic Township 大才回族乡
- Ethnic township
- Dacaixiang
- Location in Qinghai
- Coordinates: 36°30′49″N 101°28′36″E
- Country: China
- Province: Qinghai
- Prefecture-level city: Xining
- District: Huangzhong

Area
  - Total: 65.88 km^{2} (25.44 sq mi)

Population (2010)
  - Total: 23,577
  - Density: 357.9/km^{2} (926.9/sq mi)
- Time zone: UTC+8 (China Standard)
- Local dialing code: 971

Dacai Hui Ethnic Township (Chinese: 大才回族乡) is an ethnic township in Huangzhong District, Xining, Qinghai, China. In 2010, Dacai Township had a total population of 23,577: 11,986 males and 11,591 females: 6,262 aged under 14, 16,068 aged between 15 and 65 and 1,247 aged over 65.
