= Huangzhong, Xining =

Huangzhong 湟中区
- District
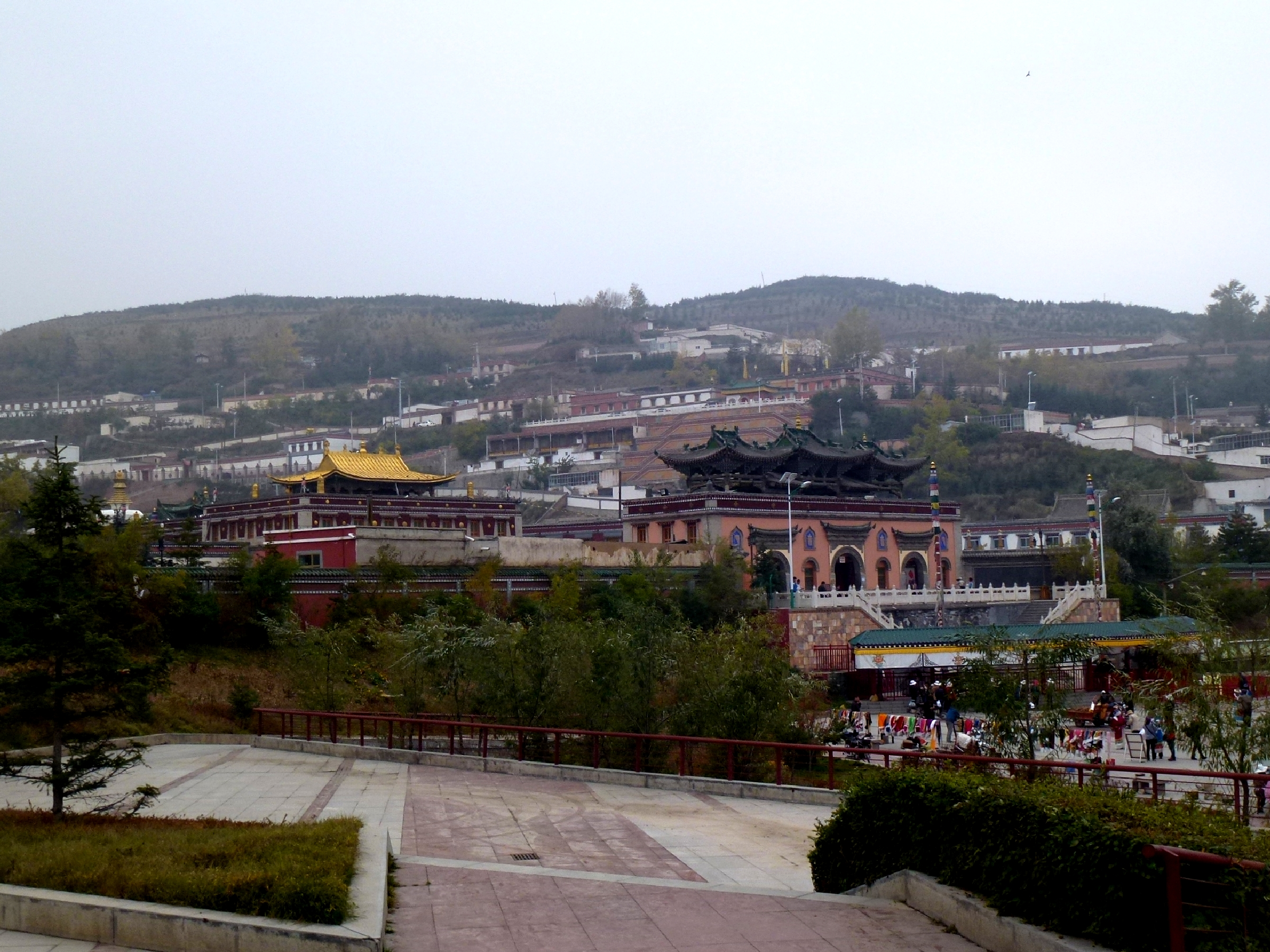
- Kumbum Monastery
- Interactive map of Huangzhong
- Location in Qinghai Huangzhong (Qinghai)
- Country: China
- Province: Qinghai
- Prefecture-level city: Xining
- Seat: Lushar Town

Area
  - District: 2,444 km^{2} (944 sq mi)
- Highest elevation: 4,488 m (14,724 ft)
- Lowest elevation: 2,225 m (7,300 ft)

Population (2020)
  - District: 463,900
  - Density: 189.8/km^{2} (491.6/sq mi)
  - Rural: 369,000
- Time zone: UTC+8 (China Standard)
- Website: www.huangzhong.gov.cn

Huangzhong, Xining

Chinese name
- Simplified Chinese: 湟中区
- Traditional Chinese: 湟中區
Transcriptions
Standard Mandarin
- Hanyu Pinyin: Huángzhōng Qū

Tibetan name
- Tibetan: ཧོང་ཀྲུང་གྲོང་རྡལ།
Transcriptions
- Wylie: hong krung grong rdal

Huangzhong District (Chinese: 湟中区) is a district of Xining, Qinghai Province, China. It is located about 80 km (50 mi) east of Qinghai Lake and about 10 km (6.2 mi) southwest of downtown Xining. In 2020 the district had a population of 463,900, of which 153,000 belonging to minorities. The Kumbum Monastery (Ta'er Temple) is located in the district.

== History ==
Huangzhong has been inhabited since at least 4,000 years ago, as shown by archeological excavations in Lijiashan town. Later, the area belonged to the Qiang people. Since the capture of Xining by Emperor Wu of Han, Huangzhong has been part of the Chinese dynasties. The Han dynasty rulers established a county called Linqiang (临羌县) in the area, governed by Jincheng (Lanzhou). In 1943, the county seat was moved to Lushar town, and the county was named Huangzhong County, after the Huangshui river basin. In 2020 Huangzhong County was changed to Huangzhong District of Xining.

== Administrative divisions ==
Huangzhong governs over 1 subdistrict, 10 towns, 5 townships and 3 ethnic townships.

- Kangchuan Subdistrict (康川街道)
- Tianjiazhai Town (田家寨镇)
- Shangxinzhuang Town (上新庄镇)
- Lushar Town (鲁沙尔镇)
- Ganhetan Town (甘河滩镇)
- Gonghe town (共和镇)
- Duoba Town (多巴镇)
- Lanlongkou Town (拦隆口镇)
- Shangwuzhuang town (上五庄镇)
- Lijiashan Town (李家山镇)
- Xibao Town (西堡镇)
- Tumenguan township (土门关乡)
- Haizigou township (海子沟乡)
- Kyunggya Tibetan Ethnic township (群加藏族乡, ཁྱུང་རྒྱ་བོད་རིགས་ཞང་།)
- Handong Hui Ethnic township (汉东回族乡)
- Dacai Hui Ethnic township (大才回族乡)

== Climate ==
Climate data for Huangzhong, elevation 2,668 m (8,753 ft), (1991–2020 normals, extremes 1981–2010)
Month	Jan	Feb	Mar	Apr	May	Jun	Jul	Aug	Sep	Oct	Nov	Dec	Year
Record high °C (°F)	12.0 (53.6)	18.3 (64.9)	23.6 (74.5)	28.3 (82.9)	27.3 (81.1)	26.9 (80.4)	33.4 (92.1)	29.0 (84.2)	25.6 (78.1)	21.1 (70.0)	15.9 (60.6)	11.4 (52.5)	33.4 (92.1)
Mean daily maximum °C (°F)	−0.3 (31.5)	3.0 (37.4)	7.9 (46.2)	13.4 (56.1)	16.8 (62.2)	19.8 (67.6)	21.6 (70.9)	20.7 (69.3)	16.3 (61.3)	11.1 (52.0)	5.9 (42.6)	1.2 (34.2)	11.4 (52.6)
Daily mean °C (°F)	−7.8 (18.0)	−4.6 (23.7)	0.5 (32.9)	6.2 (43.2)	10.2 (50.4)	13.6 (56.5)	15.6 (60.1)	14.7 (58.5)	10.4 (50.7)	4.8 (40.6)	−1.1 (30.0)	−6.2 (20.8)	4.7 (40.5)
Mean daily minimum °C (°F)	−12.8 (9.0)	−9.8 (14.4)	−4.6 (23.7)	0.6 (33.1)	4.7 (40.5)	8.4 (47.1)	10.7 (51.3)	10.2 (50.4)	6.5 (43.7)	0.8 (33.4)	−5.7 (21.7)	−11.0 (12.2)	−0.2 (31.7)
Record low °C (°F)	−22.5 (−8.5)	−21.6 (−6.9)	−18.8 (−1.8)	−11.3 (11.7)	−4.5 (23.9)	1.4 (34.5)	3.5 (38.3)	1.7 (35.1)	−0.6 (30.9)	−15.5 (4.1)	−18.9 (−2.0)	−25.2 (−13.4)	−25.2 (−13.4)
Average precipitation mm (inches)	3.7 (0.15)	5.1 (0.20)	13.3 (0.52)	30.3 (1.19)	72.0 (2.83)	81.4 (3.20)	103.6 (4.08)	104.0 (4.09)	81.6 (3.21)	29.9 (1.18)	8.7 (0.34)	3.1 (0.12)	536.7 (21.11)
Average precipitation days (≥ 0.1 mm)	5.0	5.9	7.2	8.2	12.4	15.6	16.6	15.6	15.8	9.1	4.7	4.2	120.3
Average snowy days	6.4	7.7	9.4	7.1	1.9	0.1	0	0	0.2	4.5	6.2	5.7	49.2
Average relative humidity (%)	49	49	48	49	56	62	67	71	75	67	55	51	58
Mean monthly sunshine hours	209.7	200.7	225.4	235.5	234.2	225.2	223.4	205.8	165.6	188.6	208.3	212.6	2,535
Percentage possible sunshine	67	65	60	59	53	51	51	50	45	55	69	71	58
Source: China Meteorological Administration

== See also ==
- List of administrative divisions of Qinghai
