= Song Soo-joo =

South Korean sport shooter

Personal information
- Nationality: South Korean
- Born: 24 September 1991 (age 34)
- Height: 1.74 m (5 ft 9 in)
- Weight: 90 kg (198 lb)

Sport
- Country: South Korea
- Sport: Shooting
- Event: Air rifle
Medal record
World Championships
Bronze medal – third place	2018 Changwon	10 m team air rifle

Song Soo-joo (born 24 September 1991) is a South Korean sport shooter.

She participated at the 2018 ISSF World Shooting Championships.
