= Hwang Seong-eun =

South Korean sport shooter

Hwang Seong-eun (Korean: 황성은, born February 28, 1993) is a South Korean sport shooter. She placed 17th in the women's 25 metre pistol event at the 2016 Summer Olympics.
