= Lu Shao-chuan =

Taiwanese sports shooter (born 1997)

Personal information
- Nationality: Republic of China (Taiwan)
- Born: 24 March 1997 (age 29)
- Height: 1.65 m (5 ft 5 in)
- Weight: 57 kg (126 lb)

Sport
- Country: Taiwan
- Sport: Sports shooting
- Event: Air rifle
Medal record
World Cup
Bronze medal – third place	2018 Munich	10 m air rifle
Asian Games
Gold medal – first place	2018 Jakarta-Palembang	Mixed team 10 m air rifle
Bronze medal – third place	2018 Jakarta-Palembang	10 m air rifle
Asian Air Gun Championships
Silver medal – second place	2015 New Delhi	10 m air rifle
Bronze medal – third place	2019 Taoyuan	10 m air rifle team
Bronze medal – third place	2019 Taoyuan	10 m air rifle mixed team
Representing (International Olympic Committee) Mixed-NOCs
Youth Olympic Games
Bronze medal – third place	2014 Nanjing	Mixed team 10 m air rifle

Lu Shao-chuan (Chinese: 呂紹全; Wade–Giles: Lǚ Shàoquán; born 24 March 1997) is a Taiwanese sports shooter. He competed in the 2014 Summer Youth Olympics, and grabbed the bronze medal in the mixed teams' 10m air rifle event partnered with Viktoriya Sukhorukova of Ukraine. He also competed at the 2014 and 2018 Asian Games. Teamed-up with Lin Ying-shin, they claimed the first gold medal for the Chinese Taipei contingent at the 2018 Games in the mixed 10 metre air rifle team event. He also won the bronze medal in the men's 10 m air rifle event. Lu placed fifth in the 2019 Asian Shooting Championships, and qualified for the 2020 Summer Olympics in Tokyo, becoming the first Taiwanese sports shooter to qualify for the Olympic 10-meter air rifle competition.
