= Ganhetan =

Ganhetan 甘河滩镇
- Town
- Ganhetanzhen
- Location in Qinghai
- Coordinates: 36°34′0″N 101°36′44″E
- Country: China
- Province: Qinghai
- Prefecture-level city: Xining
- District: Huangzhong

Area
  - Total: 67.93 km^{2} (26.23 sq mi)

Population (2010)
  - Total: 24,252
  - Density: 357.0/km^{2} (924.7/sq mi)
- Time zone: UTC+8 (China Standard)
- Local dialing code: 971

Ganhetan (Chinese: 甘河滩镇) is a town in Huangzhong District, Xining, Qinghai, China. In 2010, Ganhetan had a total population of 24,252: 13,484 males and 10,768 females: 4,306 aged under 14, 18,653 aged between 15 and 65 and 1,923 aged over 65.
