= Lin Ying-shin =

Taiwanese sports shooter (born 1999)

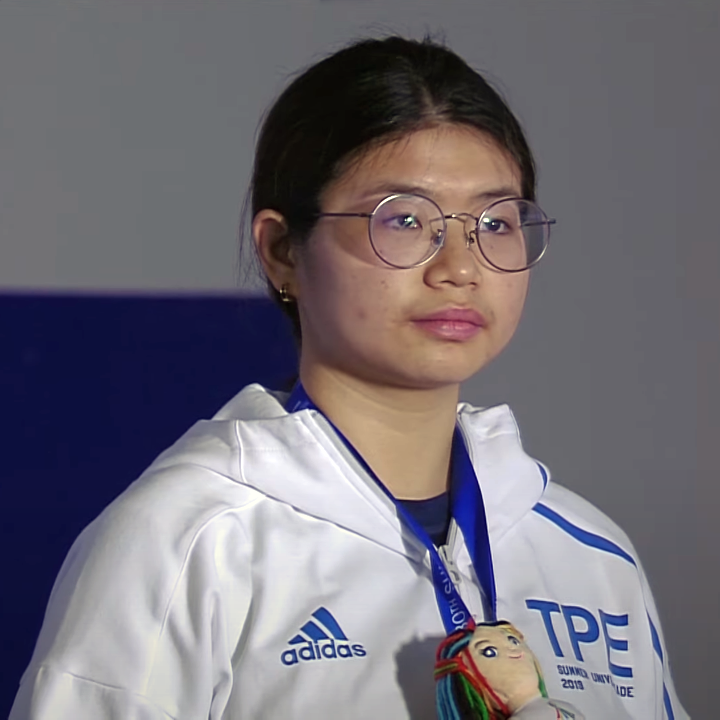
- Lin Ying-shin as the bronze medalist at the 2019 Summer Universiade

Personal information
- Nationality: Republic of China (Taiwan)
- Born: 22 April 1999 (age 27)
- Height: 1.64 m (5 ft 5 in)
- Weight: 62 kg (137 lb)

Sport
- Country: Taiwan
- Sport: Sports shooting
- Event: Air rifle
Medal record
Women's shooting
Representing Chinese Taipei
World Cup
Gold medal – first place	2018 Munich	10 m air rifle
Silver medal – second place	2018 Changwon	10 m air rifle
Asian Games
Gold medal – first place	2018 Jakarta-Palembang	Mixed team 10 m air rifle

Lin Ying-shin (Chinese: 林穎欣; Wade–Giles: Lín Yǐngxīn; born 22 April 1999) is a Taiwanese sports shooter. She won her first gold medal at the 2018 ISSF World Cup in Munich in the 10 m air rifle. Lin started off the 2018 season by winning a Junior World Cup silver medal in Sydney, and then claimed a silver in the open category at the ISSF World Cup stage 2 in Changwon. Lin competed at the 2018 Asian Games, and claimed the first gold medal for the Chinese Taipei contingent after finished in the first place in the mixed 10 metre air rifle team event partnered with Lu Shao-chuan. She finished third at the International Shooting Sport Federation World Cup in 2019, guaranteeing a place at the 2020 Summer Olympics.
