= Gonghe, Qinghai =

Gonghe 共和镇
- Town
- Gonghezhen
- Location in Qinghai
- Coordinates: 36°35′46″N 101°24′20″E
- Country: China
- Province: Qinghai
- Prefecture-level city: Xining
- District: Huangzhong

Area
  - Total: 264.5 km^{2} (102.1 sq mi)

Population (2010)
  - Total: 29,323
  - Density: 110.9/km^{2} (287.1/sq mi)
- Time zone: UTC+8 (China Standard)
- Local dialing code: 971

Gonghe (Chinese: 共和镇) is a town in Huangzhong District, Xining, Qinghai, China. In 2010, Gonghe had a total population of 29,323: 14,846 males and 14,477 females: 6,168 aged under 14, 21,259 aged between 15 and 65 and 1,896 aged over 65.
