= Choi Young-jeon =

South Korean sport shooter (born 1981)

Personal information
- Nationality: South Korean
- Born: 3 March 1981 (age 45)
- Height: 1.72 m (5 ft 8 in)
- Weight: 72 kg (159 lb)

Sport
- Country: South Korea
- Sport: Shooting
- Event: Air rifle
Medal record
World Championships
Silver medal – second place	2018 Changwon	300 m team standard rifle

Choi Young-jeon (Korean: 최영전; born 3 March 1981) is a South Korean sport shooter.

He participated at the 2018 ISSF World Shooting Championships, winning a medal.
