= Jung Eun-hea =

South Korean sport shooter

Personal information
- Nationality: South Korean
- Born: 27 September 1989 (age 36) Incheon, South Korea
- Height: 1.61 m (5 ft 3 in)
- Weight: 51 kg (112 lb)

Korean name
- Hangul: 정은혜
- RR: Jeong Eunhye
- MR: Chŏng Ŭnhye
- IPA: t͡ɕʌŋ.ɯnʝe

Sport
- Country: South Korea
- Sport: Shooting
- Event: Air rifle
Medal record
Women's shooting
Representing South Korea
World Championships
Gold medal – first place	2018 Changwon	10 m team air rifle
Bronze medal – third place	2018 Changwon	10 m air rifle
Asian Championships
Gold medal – first place	2019 Doha	10 m air rifle team
Silver medal – second place	2007 Kuwait City	10 m air rifle team
Bronze medal – third place	2019 Doha	10 m air rifle

Jung Eun-hea (Korean: 정은혜; born 27 September 1989) is a South Korean sport shooter.

Jung graduated from Kangwon Sports High School. She won the silver medal in women's 10 metre air rifle at the 2018 Asian Games. She participated at the 2018 ISSF World Shooting Championships.
