= Ravi Kumar (sport shooter) =

Indian sport shooter (born 1990)

Junior Warrant Officer Ravi Kumar
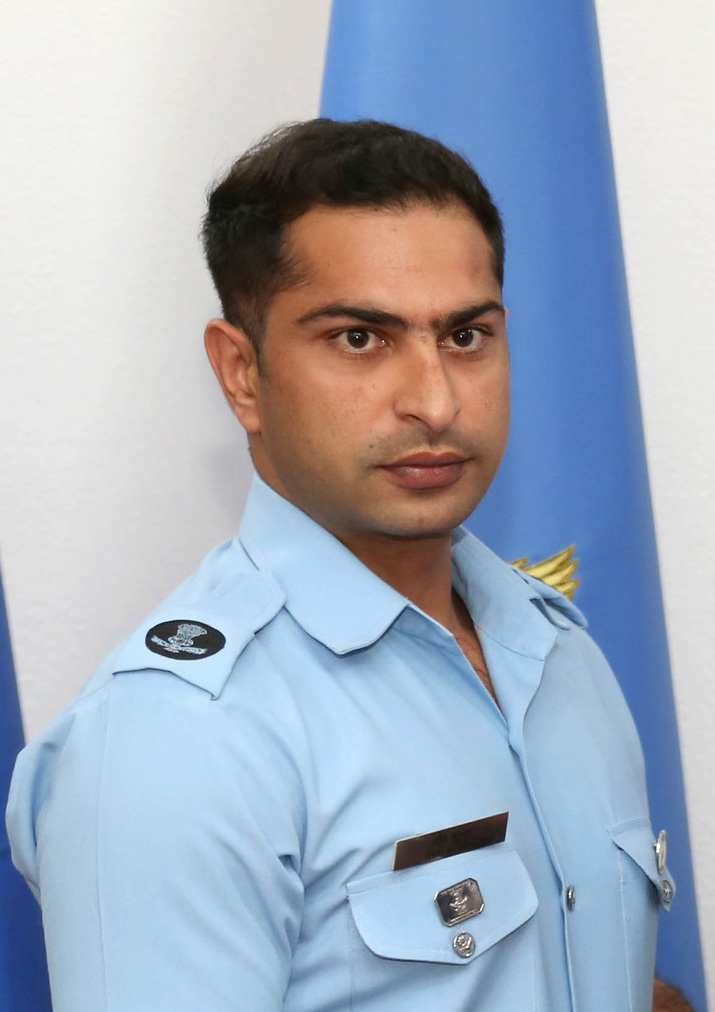
- Ravi Kumar in 2018

Personal information
- Nationality: Indian
- Born: 1 January 1990 (age 36) Meerut, Uttar Pradesh, India
- Height: 1.74 m (5 ft 9 in)
- Weight: 71 kg (157 lb)
- Military career
- Allegiance: India
- Branch: Indian Air Force
- Rank: Junior Warrant Officer

Sport
- Country: India
- Sport: Shooting
- Club: Indian Air Force
Medal record
Men's shooting
Representing India
Asian Games
Bronze medal – third place	2014 Incheon	10 m air rifle team
Bronze medal – third place	2018 Palembang	10 m air rifle mixed team
Asian Airgun Championships
Gold medal – first place	2019 Taoyuan	10 m air rifle team
Silver medal – second place	2019 Taoyuan	10 m air rifle mixed team
Commonwealth Games
Bronze medal – third place	2018 Gold Coast	10 m air rifle
- Updated on 19 August 2018

Junior Warrant Officer Ravi Kumar (born 1 January 1990) is an Indian sport shooter. He won the bronze medal at the 2014 Asian Games at Incheon in the men's 10m air rifle team event, along with Abhinav Bindra and Sanjeev Rajput. At the 2018 Commonwealth Games, he won bronze medal in the men's 10 metre air rifle event. He is a Junior Commissioned Officer in Indian Air Force.

== Early life ==
Kumar was born on 1 January 1990 in Meerut, Uttar Pradesh. He is an alumnus from Delhi University, India. He is working in Indian Air Force.

== Career ==
In the year 2014, at Incheon, South Korea in the Asian games Men's 10 metre air rifle team category, Indian shooting team comprising Ravi won the team bronze medal.

In the year 2017, at the 61st National shooting championships at the National Games shooting range in Thiruvananthapuram, in the men's 10m air rifle event, Ravi Kumar of Indian Air Force won the gold medal with a national record scoring 251.2 points, breaking his own record of 225.7 points set by him few months back. Arjun Babuta came second scoring 248.9 points and Sanjeev Rajput came third with a score of 228.0 points. Ravi was an active team member of Indian Air Force team who won the team gold medal scoring a total of 1868 points, while Haryana team with 1866 points got silver medal and Punjab team won the bronze medal scoring 1644 points.

In the year 2018, ISSF World Cup in Changwon, Korea, Ravi Kumar came fourth and narrowly missed out the bronze medal in men's 10m air rifle event. He missed out the bronze medal by a mere of 0.2 points. He scored a total of 208.4 points. The final result tally, Ravi Kumar won his first shooting World Cup medal, a bronze medal in the men's 10m Air Rifle event with a score of 226.4.

On 8 April 2018, at the Belmont Shooting Centre, 10m Air Rifle Men's Qualification, Ravi scored a total of 626.8 and came second position and qualified for the 10m Air Rifle Men's Finals. On the same day, again at the Belmont Shooting Centre, in the finals Ravi scored a total of 224.1 points and came third to win the bronze medal for the country.

At the 2018 Asian Games, he paired with Apurvi Chandela for the 10 meter air rifle mixed team event, and won a bronze medal.
