= Lee Won-gyu =

South Korean sport shooter

Personal information
- Nationality: South Korean
- Born: 13 October 1993 (age 32)
- Height: 1.78 m (5 ft 10 in)
- Weight: 84 kg (185 lb)

Sport
- Country: South Korea
- Sport: Shooting
- Event: Air rifle
Medal record
World Championships
Silver medal – second place	2018 Changwon	300 m team standard rifle

Lee Won-gyu (born 13 October 1993) is a South Korean sport shooter.

He participated at the 2018 ISSF World Shooting Championships, winning a medal.
