= Minhal Sohail =

Pakistani sport shooter

Personal information
- Born: 3 January 1995 (age 31)

Sport
- Sport: Sport shooting

Minhal Sohail (born 3 January 1995) is a Pakistani sport shooter. In 2016, she became the first female shooter to represent her country at the Olympics when she participated in the Rio Games. She competes in the 10 metre Air Rifle category.

== Career ==
Hailing from Karachi, Sohail started her shooting career in 2012. Trained at PNS Karsaz shooting range in Karachi, in national tournaments she represents Pakistan Navy. She has secured notable positions and accolades in numerous tournaments across the globe.

=== Rio Olympics ===
Sohail competed on a quota place in the women's 10 metre air rifle event at the 2016 Summer Olympics. Needing to secure a spot in the top eight to progress, she ranked 28th among 51 shooters and finished with 413.2 points. Sohail stated that she was excited for her participation in the mega sporting event and wished to bring laurels to Pakistan. She considers it an honor to be the first Pakistani woman shooter to compete at the Olympics.

== Media coverage ==
Oscar-winning filmmaker Sharmeen Obaid-Chinoy has developed a short documentary about her titled ‘Dream Big Pakistan. The short-film shares her training sessions at the Pakistan Navy Shooting Range Facility, Karsaz and her vision of being a part of the Olympics. The film also features S/Lieutenant Coach Khalid Bin Anwar who coached Minhal for the Olympics.
