= Zhao Ruozhu =

Chinese sport shooter

Personal information
- Nationality: Chinese
- Born: 7 August 1998 (age 27) Shanxi, China
- Height: 1.68 m (5 ft 6 in)
- Weight: 55 kg (121 lb)

Sport
- Country: China
- Sport: Shooting
- Event: Air rifle
Medal record
World Championships
Gold medal – first place	2018 Changwon	10 m mixed air rifle
Asian Championships
Gold medal – first place	2019 Doha	50 m rifle 3 positions team
Bronze medal – third place	2019 Doha	10 m air rifle mixed team

Zhao Ruozhu (simplified Chinese: 赵若竹; traditional Chinese: 趙若竹; pinyin: Zhào Ruòzhú; born 7 August 1998) is a Chinese sport shooter. She won gold medal in 10 m air rifle at the 2018 Asian Games. She also won a Silver in 10 m air rifle in mixed events along with Yang Haoran.
