= Apurvi Chandela =

Indian sport shooter (born 1993)

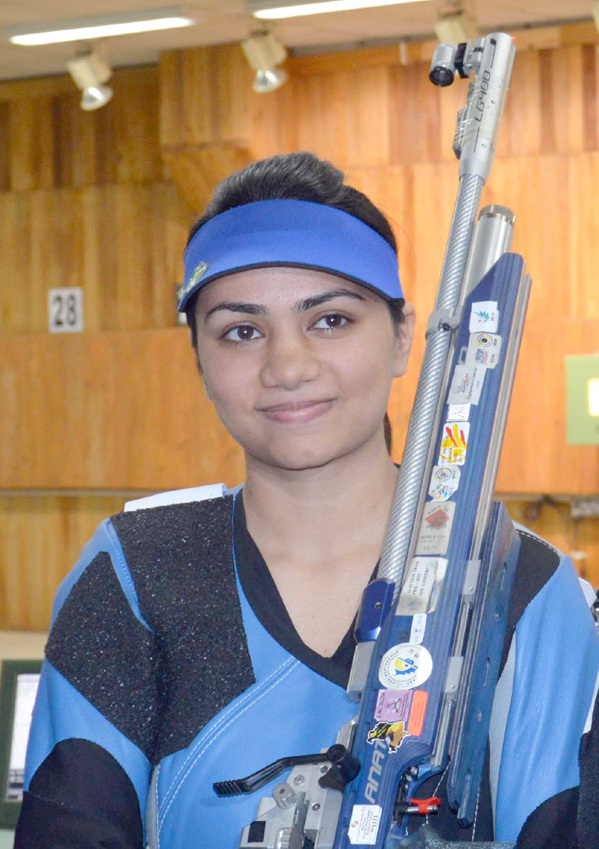
- Apurvi Chandela at the 12th South Asian Games 2016

Personal information
- Nationality: Indian
- Born: 4 January 1993 (age 33) Jaipur, Rajasthan, India
- Height: 1.54 m (5 ft 1 in)
- Weight: 52 kg (115 lb)

Sport
- Country: India
- Sport: Shooting
- Event: 10 metre air rifle
Medal record
Women's shooting
Representing India
World Cup Final
Silver medal – second place	2019 Putian	Mixed Team 10 metre air rifle
Silver medal – second place	2015 Munich	10 metre air rifle
World Cup
Gold medal – first place	2019 Munich	10 metre air rifle
Gold medal – first place	2019 New Delhi	10 metre air rifle
Gold medal – first place	2019 Rio de Janeiro	Mixed Team 10 metre air rifle
Silver medal – second place	2019 Munich	Mixed Team 10 metre air rifle
Bronze medal – third place	2015 Changwon	10 metre air rifle
Commonwealth Games
Gold medal – first place	2014 Glasgow	10 m air rifle
Bronze medal – third place	2018 Gold Coast	10 m air rifle
Asian Games
Bronze medal – third place	2018 Jakarta Palembang	10 m air rifle mixed team
Asian Championships
Silver medal – second place	2019 Doha	10 m air rifle team

Apurvi Singh Chandela (born 4 January 1993) is an Indian Shooting player who competes in the 10 metre air rifle event. She won the gold medal in the 2019 ISSF World Cup in New Delhi. She is a recipient of Arjuna award.

== Early life and background ==
Chandela was born on 4 January 1993 in Jaipur, Rajasthan. Her father, Kuldeep Singh Chandela, is a hotelier and a sports enthusiast and mother, Bindu Rathore, is a businesswoman, who was a basketball player. She did her schooling from Mayo College Girls School Ajmer & Maharani Gayatri Devi Girls' School, Jaipur. She studied Sociology honours from Jesus and Mary College, Delhi University.

In her early years, Chandela wanted to become a sports journalist, but she was inspired to take up shooting as a sport by Abhinav Bindra's performance at the 2008 Beijing Olympics, where he won a gold medal in shooting. Initially, she had to travel for 45 minutes to reach a shooting range in Jaipur. Later on, her parents set up a shooting range for 10-meter air rifle practice for her at their home.

In 2009, Chandela won the All India School Shooting Competition, and the Senior national shooting championship in 2012. She registered podium finishes at national events at least six times during 2012–2019.

Chandela enjoys reading in her free time and practices meditation to enhance her focus to help her game.

== Career ==
In 2012, Chandela won the gold medal in the 10 metres air rifle event at the National shooting and chandela was a woman shooter champion in New Delhi, her first year in the senior circuit. In 2014, she won four medals at the InterShoot Championships at The Hague, that included two individual and two team medals. In the same year, she won the gold medal in the Commonwealth Games in Glasgow, having scored 206.7 points in final, in the process creating a new games record. And a year later, she debuted in ISSF World Cup in Changwon, where she won a bronze medal.

Chandela qualified for the 2016 Rio Olympics in the women's 10m air rifle event, where she finished at 34th position in the qualification round out of 51 contestants. Chandela received the Arjuna Award, from the President of India in 2016.

At the 2018 Asian Games, she paired with Ravi Kumar for the 10 meter air rifle mixed team event, and won a bronze medal. She is being mentored by former National Champion Rakesh Manpat. In the 2018 Commonwealth Games, Chandela won a bronze medal for India. She won the gold medal at the 2019 ISSF World Cup in New Delhi and set a world record of 252.9 in the 10-metre air rifle event. She has secured a gold medal in women's 10m air rifle at the (ISSF) World Cup 2019.

In ISSF World Cup 2019 in New Delhi, Chandela won the first medal for India by winning the gold medal with a record score in the women's 10m air rifle event. The 28 years old set a new world record in the process with 252.9 points to bag her third individual World Cup medal. The shooter, rose to the top of the table in the finals with her 17th shot and then followed it up with 10.8 in the 18th shot. In the 2016 Swedish Cup Grand Prix, Chandela broke the world record for the second time in three years after her score of 211.2.

Chandela also secured a quota spot to participate in the Tokyo Olympics in Women's 10 metre air rifle event, where she finished at 36th position in the qualification round out of 50 participants. In 2020, she won a gold medal at a private tournament in Meyton cop, Austria.

== ISSF World Medal Tally ==
No.	Event	Championship	Year	Place	Medal
1	10m air rifle	ISSF World Cup	2015	Changwon	3rd place, bronze medalist(s)
2	10m air rifle	ISSF World Cup	2015	Munich	2nd place, silver medalist(s)
3	10m air rifle	ISSF World Cup	2019	New Delhi	1st place, gold medalist(s)
4	10m air rifle	ISSF World Cup	2019	Munich	1st place, gold medalist(s)
5	10 meter air rifle	ISSF World Cup	2019	Beijing	Rank4
6	10 meter air rifle	ISSF World Cup	2018	Munich	Rank4
7	10 meter air rifle	ISSF World Cup	2018	Guadalajara	Rank7
8	Mixed Team 10 metre air rifle	ISSF World Cup	2019	Munich	2nd place, silver medalist(s)
9	Mixed Team 10 metre air rifle	ISSF World Cup	2019	Rio de Janeiro	1st place, gold medalist(s)
10	Mixed Team 10 metre air rifle	ISSF World Cup Final	2019	Putian	2nd place, silver medalist(s)
11		Indian Senior National Shooting Championship	2012	New Delhi	Rank 1
12		Commonwealth Games	2014	Glasgow	Rank 1
13		Commonwealth Games	2018	Gold Coast	Rank 3

== Awards ==
- Arjuna Award, India 2016
