= Shooting at the 2022 Asian Games – Men's 25 metre rapid fire pistol =

Men's 25 metre rapid fire pistol at the 2022 Asian Games
- Venue: Fuyang Yinhu Sports Centre
- Dates: 24–25 September 2023
- Competitors: 31 from 13 nations

Medalists
gold medal	Li Yuehong	China
silver medal	Liu Yangpan	China
bronze medal	Nikita Chiryukin	Kazakhstan

The men's 25 metre rapid fire pistol competition at the 2022 Asian Games in Hangzhou, China was held on 24 and 25 September 2023 at Fuyang Yinhu Sports Centre.

== Schedule ==
All times are China Standard Time (UTC+08:00)

Date	Time	Event
Sunday, 24 September 2022	09:00	Qualification stage 1
Monday, 25 September 2023	09:00	Qualification stage 2
Monday, 25 September 2023	14:00	Final

== Records ==
Prior to this competition, the existing world, Asian and Games records were as follows.

Qualification
World Record	Christian Reitz (GER)	593	Osijek, Croatia	30 July 2013
Asian Record	Kim Jun-hong (KOR)	593	Beijing, China	6 July 2014
Games Record	Kim Jun-hong (KOR)	589	Palembang, Indonesia	25 August 2018
Final
World Record	Kim Jun-hong (KOR)	38	Changwon, South Korea	25 April 2018
Asian Record	Kim Jun-hong (KOR)	38	Changwon, South Korea	25 April 2018
Games Record	Yao Zhaonan (CHN)	34	Palembang, Indonesia	25 August 2018

== Results ==
Legend

- DNS — Did not start

=== Qualification ===
Rank	Athlete	Stage 1			Stage 2			Total	Xs	Notes
Rank	Athlete	8	6	4	8	6	4	Total	Xs	Notes
1	Li Yuehong (CHN)	100	99	97	99	98	97	590	23	GR
2	Liu Yangpan (CHN)	99	99	95	99	98	98	588	19	
3	Wang Xinjie (CHN)	100	97	97	99	98	96	587	21	
4	Anang Yulianto (INA)	100	96	97	97	99	95	584	16	
5	Ghulam Mustafa Bashir (PAK)	98	97	97	99	98	94	583	16	
6	Vijayveer Sidhu (IND)	99	97	93	99	98	96	582	18	
7	Nikita Chiryukin (KAZ)	100	99	94	99	95	94	581	20	
8	Theethat Praditsudswat (THA)	98	96	93	99	98	97	581	15	
9	Song Jong-ho (KOR)	99	97	95	97	95	97	580	20	
10	Hiroyoshi Ichikawa (JPN)	99	95	94	98	98	94	578	15	
11	Hà Minh Thành (VIE)	97	99	96	96	98	92	578	15	
12	Kim Seo-jun (KOR)	97	95	96	97	97	96	578	14	
13	Lee Gun-hyeok (KOR)	100	97	94	99	96	90	576	22	
14	Adarsh Singh (IND)	95	95	97	96	97	96	576	13	
15	Vũ Tiến Nam (VIE)	98	96	97	97	94	93	575	14	
16	Enkhtaivany Davaakhüü (MGL)	94	99	91	97	96	95	572	17	
17	Dai Yoshioka (JPN)	99	98	83	100	97	92	569	24	
18	Totok Tri Martanto (INA)	93	96	96	93	97	94	569	12	
19	Dewa Putu Yadi Suteja (INA)	98	94	90	96	94	93	565	9	
20	Phan Xuân Chuyên (VIE)	97	97	84	97	94	93	562	14	
21	Schwakon Triniphakorn (THA)	97	95	89	96	94	91	562	13	
22	Anish Bhanwala (IND)	98	98	96	94	90	84	560	14	
23	Chen Haohui (HKG)	96	94	88	95	97	90	560	7	
24	Sriyanon Karndee (THA)	95	93	92	97	90	92	559	11	
25	Eita Mori (JPN)	96	94	82	95	96	94	557	14	
26	Artemiy Kabakov (KAZ)	96	97	89	98	93	83	556	17	
27	Ruslan Yunusmetov (KAZ)	97	99	87	92	91	89	555	11	
28	Abdulla Al-Obaidli (QAT)	98	88	84	96	92	87	545	9	
29	Oyuny Tögöldör (MGL)	94	98	84	96	87	82	541	11	
30	Pak Kam In (MAC)	90	89	75	92	91	71	508	4	
—	Mohamed Hassan Al-Tamimi (QAT)							DNS		

=== Final ===
Rank	Athlete	1st stage			2nd stage – Elimination					S-off	Notes
Rank	Athlete	1	2	3	1	2	3	4	5	S-off	Notes
1st place, gold medalist(s)	Li Yuehong (CHN)	4	7	12	17	21	25	30	33		
2nd place, silver medalist(s)	Liu Yangpan (CHN)	4	7	11	14	19	24	27	31		
3rd place, bronze medalist(s)	Nikita Chiryukin (KAZ)	5	9	13	18	21	24	26			
4	Vijayveer Sidhu (IND)	2	5	9	14	18	21				
5	Anang Yulianto (INA)	4	8	10	14	17					
6	Ghulam Mustafa Bashir (PAK)	4	8	10	13						
