= Shooting at the 2020 Summer Olympics – Men's 25 metre rapid fire pistol =

Men's 25 metre rapid fire pistol at the Games of the XXXII Olympiad
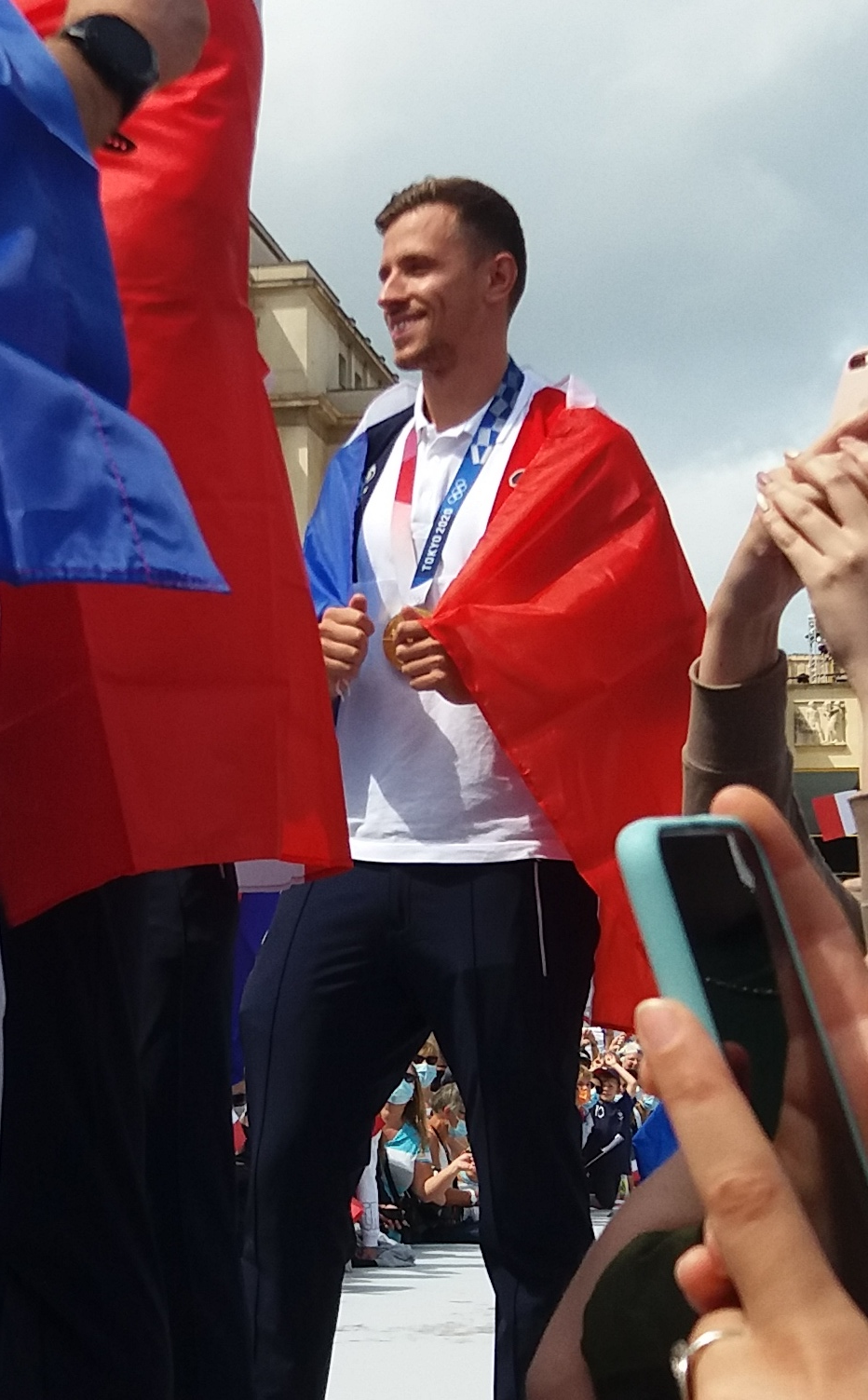
- Jean Quiquampoix
- Venue: Asaka Shooting Range
- Dates: 1 August 2021 (qualifying course 1); 2 August 2021 (qualifying course 2 and final)
- Competitors: 27 from 19 nations
- Winning score: 34

Medalists
1st place, gold medalist(s)		Jean Quiquampoix	France
2nd place, silver medalist(s)		Leuris Pupo	Cuba
3rd place, bronze medalist(s)		Li Yuehong	China

The men's ISSF 25 meter rapid fire pistol event at the 2020 Summer Olympics took place on 1 and 2 August 2021 at the Asaka Shooting Range. Approximately 30 shooters from 20 nations are expected to compete in the rapid fire pistol, with the precise number depending on how many shooters compete in multiple events.

== Background ==
This will be the 26th of what has been standardised in 1948 as the men's ISSF 25 meter rapid fire pistol event, the only event on the 2020 programme that traces back to 1896. The event has been held at every Summer Olympics except 1904 and 1928 (when no shooting events were held) and 1908; it was nominally open to women from 1968 to 1980, although very few women participated these years. The first five events were quite different, with some level of consistency finally beginning with the 1932 event—which, though it had differences from the 1924 competition, was roughly similar. The 1936 competition followed the 1932 one quite closely. The post-World War II event substantially altered the competition once again. The 1984 Games introduced women's-only shooting events, including the ISSF 25 meter pistol (though this is more similar to the non-Olympic men's ISSF 25 meter center-fire pistol than the rapid fire pistol).

Of the six finalists from 2016, one has been announced as a returning competitor. Jean Quiquampoix of France earned a qualifying spot at the 2018 World Championships and has been selected by his NOC. Three other 2016 finalists (gold medalist Christian Reitz of Germany, fifth-place finisher Leuris Pupo of Cuba, and sixth-place finisher Riccardo Mazzetti of Italy) have earned quota spots but their NOCs have not announced selections yet. The remaining two (bronze medalist Li Yuehong and fourth-place finisher Zhang Fusheng of China) saw other shooters from their NOC earn spots; the NOC has not announced its selections yet.

The United States has earned a qualifying spot and is expected to make its 22nd appearance, most of any nation.

== Qualification ==
Each National Olympic Committee (NOC) can enter up to two shooters if the NOC earns enough quota sports or has enough double starter-qualified shooters. To compete, a shooter needs a quota spot and to achieve a Minimum Qualification Score (MQS). Once a shooter is using a quota spot in any shooting event, they can enter any other shooting event for which they have achieved the MQS as well (a double starter qualification). There are 29 quota spots available for the rapid fire pistol (significantly increased since the elimination of the 50 metre pistol after 2016). They are: 4 for the 2018 World Championships, 8 for 2019 World Cup events, 13 from continental events (4 each from Asia and Europe, 3 from the Americas, and 1 each from Africa and Oceania), 1 for the host nation (Japan), 2 from Tripartite Commission invitations, and 1 from world ranking.

The MQS for the men's 25 metre rapid fire pistol for 2020 is 560.

The COVID-19 pandemic delayed some of the events for qualifying for shooting, though many had been complete before the effects were felt.

== Competition format ==
The competition format will continue to use the two-round (qualifying round and final) format, as in 1988 and since 1996, with the final format introduced in 2012. The 2005 rules changes required the pistols used to be sport pistols, banning .22 Short cartridges.

The qualifying round from 1988 onward was essentially the same as the full competition format from 1948 to 1984. Each shooter fired 60 shots. These were done in two courses of 30; each course consisted of two stages of 15; each stage consisted of three series of 5. In each stage, the time limit for each series was 8 seconds for the first, 6 seconds for the second, and 4 seconds for the third.

The 1988 tournament had added a two-series final for the top eight shooters; the 1992 competition broke that down to a four-series semifinal for the top eight and two-series final for the top four. In 1996 and 2000, the top eight once again advanced to the final. The 2004 version had reduced the number of finalists to six, where it stayed in 2008 and 2012.

Prior to 2008, the final involved two series of 5 shots at 4 seconds. In 2008, that was expanded to four series. The 2012 competition used an entirely different format, however, which remained in effect in 2016 and 2020. The competition switched to a "hit-or-miss" system, where a 9.7 or better scores as a "hit" for 1 point and anything lower scores as a "miss" for 0 points. The final featured 8 series of 5 shots each (5 points maximum per series, 40 points maximum total). However, starting with the fourth series, the remaining shooter with the lowest total was eliminated after each series (5 shooters remaining in the fifth series, 4 in the sixth, 3 in the seventh, and only 2 in the eighth and final series).

The 1992 competition had introduced round targets rather than the silhouettes used from 1948 to 1988 as well as many pre-World War II versions of the event. Score, rather than hits, had been used as the primary ranking method since 1960.

== Records ==
Prior to this competition, the existing world and Olympic records were as follows.

Qualifying records
World record	Christian Reitz (GER); Kim Jun-hong (KOR)	593	Osijek, Croatia; Beijing, China	30 July 2013; 6 July 2014
Olympic record	Alexei Klimov (RUS)	592	London, United Kingdom	3 August 2012

Final records
World record	Kim Jun-hong (KOR)	38	Changwon, South Korea	25 April 2018
Olympic record	Leuris Pupo (CUB)	34	London, United Kingdom	3 August 2012

== Schedule ==
The competition is held over two days, Sunday, 1 August and Monday, 2 August. The first half of the qualifying round is the first day; the second half of the qualifying round as well as the final is on the second day.

All times are Japan Standard Time (UTC+9)

Date	Time	Round
Sunday, 1 August 2021	8:30	Qualifying: Course 1
Monday, 2 August 2021	8:30	Qualifying: Course 2 Final

== Results ==
=== Qualifying ===
Rank	Shooter	Nation	Course 1				Course 2				Total	Notes
Rank	Shooter	Nation	8s	6s	4s	Total	8s	6s	4s	Total	Total	Notes
1	Christian Reitz	Germany	100	98	98	296	98	99	94	291	587-18x	Q
2	Jean Quiquampoix	France	100	99	98	297	98	98	93	289	586-24x	Q
3	Han Dae-yoon	South Korea	97	99	99	295	98	98	94	290	585-22x	Q
4	Lin Junmin	China	97	100	97	294	97	99	94	290	584-20x	Q
5	Leuris Pupo	Cuba	98	99	93	290	99	99	95	293	583-21x	Q
6	Li Yuehong	China	96	99	97	292	96	100	94	290	582-28x	Q
7	Clément Bessaguet	France	100	100	97	297	99	93	93	285	582-22x	
8	Dai Yoshioka	Japan	95	98	97	290	100	99	93	292	582-17x	
9	Pavlo Korostylov	Ukraine	97	96	93	286	99	99	96	294	580-17x	
10	Ghulam Mustafa Bashir	Pakistan	99	98	96	293	99	95	92	286	579-14x	
11	Leonid Yekimov	ROC	96	99	94	289	98	97	94	289	578-21x	
12	Jorge Álvarez	Cuba	98	97	92	287	100	98	93	291	578-17x	
13	Oliver Geis	Germany	96	96	93	285	96	99	97	292	577-24x	
14	Tommaso Chelli	Italy	94	98	96	288	95	98	96	289	577-16x	
15	Muhammad Khalil Akhtar	Pakistan	98	96	92	286	97	94	95	286	572-19x	
16	Riccardo Mazzetti	Italy	94	97	94	285	99	96	92	287	572-16x	
17	Sergei Evglevski	Australia	94	96	95	285	97	96	94	287	572-14x	
18	Marko Carrillo	Peru	99	92	97	288	96	97	91	284	572-11x	
19	Peeter Olesk	Estonia	95	94	95	284	99	96	93	288	572-10x	
20	Isaranuudom Phurihiranphat	Thailand	97	97	92	286	97	94	93	284	570-13x	
21	Ruslan Lunev	Azerbaijan	98	93	90	281	95	95	96	286	567-11x	
22	Henry Leverett	United States	98	94	92	284	93	97	92	282	566-9x	
23	Enkhtaivany Davaakhüü	Mongolia	98	94	91	283	99	89	94	282	565-18x	
24	Özgür Varlık	Turkey	98	97	86	281	96	95	83	274	555-10x	
25	Jack Leverett III	United States	98	92	86	276	96	95	85	276	552-15x	
26	Bernardo Tobar Prado	Colombia	93	96	85	274	93	88	91	272	546-12x	
	Song Jong-ho	South Korea	Disqualified									

=== Final ===
Rank	Athlete	Nation	Series								Notes
Rank	Athlete	Nation	1	2	3	4	5	6	7	8	Notes
1st place, gold medalist(s)	Jean Quiquampoix	France	4	7	12	17	21	25	30	34	=OR
2nd place, silver medalist(s)	Leuris Pupo	Cuba	3	8	12	16	19	24	27	29	
3rd place, bronze medalist(s)	Li Yuehong	China	3	7	11	15	19	22*	26	—N/a	
4	Han Dae-yoon	South Korea	3	8	12	15	19	22*	—N/a		SO
5	Christian Reitz	Germany	3	7	11	14	18	—N/a			
6	Lin Junmin	China	2	5	8	12	—N/a				
