= Shooting at the 2026 Asian Games – Men's 25 metre rapid fire pistol =

Men's 25 metre rapid fire pistol at the 2026 Asian Games
- Venue: Aichi Pref. General Shooting Gallery
- Dates: 1 October 2026
- Competitors: 30 from 13 nations

Medalists
gold medal	Lee Gun-hyeok	South Korea
silver medal	Su Lianbofan	China
bronze medal	Ghulam Mustafa Bashir	Pakistan

The men's 25 metre rapid fire pistol competition at the 2026 Asian Games in Aichi, Japan was held on 1 October 2026 at Aichi Pref. General Shooting Gallery.

== Schedule ==
All times are Japan Standard Time (UTC+09:00)

Date	Time	Event
Thursday, 1 October 2026	09:40	Qualification
Thursday, 1 October 2026	15:30	Final

== Records ==
Prior to this competition, the existing world, Asian and Games records were as follows.

Qualification
World Record	Clement Bessaguet (FRA)	594	Osijek, Croatia	9 May 2026
Asian Record	Kim Jun-hong (KOR)	593	Beijing, China	6 July 2014
Games Record	Li Yuehong (CHN)	590	Hangzhou, China	25 September 2023
Final
World Record	Su Lianbofan (CHN)	35	Munich, Germany	29 May 2026
Asian Record	Dai Yoshioka (JPN)	31	New Delhi, India	11 February 2026
Games Record	Yao Zhaonan (CHN)	34	Palembang, Indonesia	25 August 2018

== Results ==
Legend

- DNS — Did not start
- DSQ — Disqualified
- x — Inner ten

=== Qualification ===
Rank	Athlete	Stage 1			Stage 2			Total	Xs	Notes
Rank	Athlete	8	6	4	8	6	4	Total	Xs	Notes
1	Su Lianbofan (CHN)	100	99	98	99	98	98	592	24	GR
2	Lee Gun-hyeok (KOR)	98	100	94	100	98	98	588	20	
3	Yoon Seo-yeong (KOR)	100	99	94	95	95	98	581	18	
4	Song Jong-ho (KOR)	99	98	91	98	99	95	580	26	
5	Nikita Chiryukin (KAZ)	95	99	95	97	98	94	578	20	
6	Ghulam Mustafa Bashir (PAK)	95	96	98	98	99	92	578	19	
7	Pham Quang Huy (VIE)	99	94	93	98	99	95	578	18	
8	Dewa Putu Yadi Suteja (INA)	98	97	94	95	98	96	578	16	
9	Anish Bhanwala (IND)	97	96	97	96	96	94	576	17	
10	He Shiyu (CHN)	98	96	96	98	97	91	576	14	
11	Daranpop Kanjanapong (THA)	99	97	95	96	95	92	574	11	
12	Yang Yuhao (CHN)	97	94	92	99	99	91	572	15	
13	Aris Febrianto (INA)	96	95	96	97	96	92	572	7	
14	Kirill Tsukanov (KAZ)	99	96	86	97	97	95	570	15	
15	Hibiki Takeuchi (JPN)	97	98	87	99	94	95	570	14	
16	Muhamad Fawwaz Aditia Farrel (INA)	99	96	90	97	92	96	570	13	
17	Dai Yoshioka (JPN)	96	99	92	97	96	90	570	13	
18	Hà Minh Thành (VIE)	96	92	95	95	96	95	569	11	
19	Enkhtaivan Davaakhuu (MGL)	95	96	88	97	96	95	567	14	
20	Chen Haohui (HKG)	96	98	90	94	94	95	567	13	
21	Schwakon Triniphakorn (THA)	94	97	90	99	93	94	567	10	
22	Hiroki Iwata (JPN)	98	96	92	97	94	89	566	10	
23	Artemiy Kabakov (KAZ)	97	92	94	95	95	90	563	5	
24	Vũ Tiến Nam (VIE)	98	95	85	97	94	91	560	12	
25	Enkhtaivan Badamgarav (MGL)	93	91	87	96	98	86	551	12	
26	Yaqoob Abdallah Ali Al-Siyabi (OMA)	92	94	77	97	89	81	530	9	
27	Mohammed Nasser A A Alyafei (QAT)	98	87	84	95	82	84	530	4	
—	Muhammad Umer Farooq (PAK)							DNS		
—	Mohammad Shabbir (PAK)							DNS		
—	Buyanzaya Shirgal (MGL)							DSQ		

=== Final ===
Rank	Athlete	1st stage		2nd stage – Elimination						Total	SO	Notes
Rank	Athlete	1	2	1	2	3	4	5	6	Total	SO	Notes
1st place, gold medalist(s)	Lee Gun-hyeok (KOR)	5	9	13	16	21	25	28	32	32		GR
2nd place, silver medalist(s)	Su Lianbofan (CHN)	3	7	12	15	20	23	27	32	32	SO	GR
3rd place, bronze medalist(s)	Ghulam Mustafa Bashir (PAK)	3	6	11	13	18	21		22	22		
4	Pham Quang Huy (VIE)	3	7	11	15	18			20	20		
5	Dewa Putu Yadi Suteja (INA)	5	10	12	16				18	18		
6	Yoon Seoyeong (KOR)	4	7	11					12	12		
7	Anish Bhanwala (IND)	3	7						11	11		
8	Nikita Chiryukin (KAZ)	1	3						7	7		
