= Shooting at the 2018 Asian Games – Men's 25 metre rapid fire pistol =

Shooting event

Men's 25 metre rapid fire pistol at the 2018 Asian Games
- Venue: Jakabaring Shooting Range
- Dates: 24–25 August 2018
- Competitors: 21 from 12 nations

Medalists
gold medal	Yao Zhaonan	China
silver medal	Lin Junmin	China
bronze medal	Kim Jun-hong	South Korea

The men's 25 metre rapid fire pistol event at the 2018 Asian Games in Palembang, Indonesia took place on 24 and 25 August at the Jakabaring International Shooting Range.

== Schedule ==
All times are Western Indonesia Time (UTC+07:00)

Date	Time	Event
Friday, 24 August 2018	09:00	Qualification stage 1
Saturday, 25 August 2018	09:00	Qualification stage 2
Saturday, 25 August 2018	15:00	Final

== Records ==
Prior to this competition, the existing world, Asian and Games records were as follows.

Qualification
World Record	Christian Reitz (GER)	593	Osijek, Croatia	30 July 2013
Asian Record	Kim Jun-hong (KOR)	593	Beijing, China	6 July 2014
Games Record	Li Yuehong (CHN)	586	Incheon, South Korea	24 September 2014
Final
World Record	Kim Jun-hong (KOR)	38	Changwon, South Korea	25 April 2018
Asian Record	Kim Jun-hong (KOR)	38	Changwon, South Korea	25 April 2018
Games Record	Kim Jun-hong (KOR)	31	Incheon, South Korea	24 September 2014

== Results ==
=== Qualification ===
Rank	Athlete	Stage 1			Stage 2			Total	Xs	Notes
Rank	Athlete	8	6	4	8	6	4	Total	Xs	Notes
1	Kim Jun-hong (KOR)	99	99	98	99	100	94	589	28	GR
2	Lin Junmin (CHN)	98	100	97	98	100	95	588	21	
3	Yao Zhaonan (CHN)	98	98	96	99	100	94	585	26	
4	Anang Yulianto (INA)	97	97	91	100	99	95	579	20	
5	Phan Công Minh (VIE)	99	99	93	97	99	92	579	20	
6	Hà Minh Thành (VIE)	99	98	92	98	97	95	579	16	
7	Song Jong-ho (KOR)	97	97	98	97	98	91	578	20	
8	Ghulam Mustafa Bashir (PAK)	99	97	94	97	97	93	577	19	
9	Anish Bhanwala (IND)	97	99	97	96	94	93	576	19	
10	Enkhtaivany Davaakhüü (MGL)	99	96	97	98	94	89	573	14	
11	Shivam Shukla (IND)	98	98	93	97	97	86	569	13	
12	Muhammad Khalil Akhtar (PAK)	98	93	92	96	97	93	569	12	
13	Teruyoshi Akiyama (JPN)	98	98	94	98	98	82	568	20	
14	Isaranuudom Phurihiranphat (THA)	98	100	88	97	97	84	564	15	
15	Totok Trimartanto (INA)	92	98	91	93	96	94	564	7	
16	Said Al-Hashmi (OMA)	98	95	90	96	94	88	561	17	
17	Ahmad Zayed Al-Shamari (QAT)	98	95	91	97	95	85	561	16	
18	Sergey Vokhmyanin (KAZ)	97	87	95	96	92	93	560	14	
19	Mohamed Hassan Al-Tamimi (QAT)	92	92	92	97	89	91	553	11	
20	Sriyanon Karndee (THA)	95	94	94	95	94	80	552	9	
21	Shirgalyn Buyanzayaa (MGL)	97	98	73	91	95	73	527	8	

=== Final ===
Rank	Athlete	1st stage			2nd stage – Elimination					S-off	Notes
Rank	Athlete	1	2	3	1	2	3	4	5	S-off	Notes
1st place, gold medalist(s)	Yao Zhaonan (CHN)	5	10	14	19	23	26	30	34		GR
2nd place, silver medalist(s)	Lin Junmin (CHN)	3	7	12	17	21	25	29	33		
3rd place, bronze medalist(s)	Kim Jun-hong (KOR)	4	9	14	16	21	25	29		SO	
4	Hà Minh Thành (VIE)	3	5	9	12	16	20				
5	Phan Công Minh (VIE)	3	5	8	11	13					
6	Anang Yulianto (INA)	2	3	5	7						
