= 2017 Asian Airgun Championships =

- Host city: Wako, Japan
- Dates: 6–12 December 2017
- Main venue: Wako City Gymnasium

The 2017 Asian Airgun Championships were held at Wako City Gymnasium, Wako, Japan between 6 and 12 December 2017.

== Medal summary ==
=== Men ===
Event	Gold	Silver	Bronze
10 m air pistol	He Zhengyang; China	Yang Wei; China	Jitu Rai; India
10 m air pistol team	India; Jitu Rai; Shahzar Rizvi; Omkar Singh	China; He Zhengyang; Wang Zhehao; Yang Wei	Vietnam; Hoàng Xuân Vinh; Nguyễn Đình Thành; Trần Quốc Cường
10 m air rifle	Song Buhan; China	Cao Yifei; China	Ravi Kumar; India
10 m air rifle team	China; Cao Yifei; Song Buhan; Yang Haoran	India; Deepak Kumar; Ravi Kumar; Gagan Narang	Japan; Masaya Endo; Naoya Okada; Atsushi Shimada

=== Women ===
Event	Gold	Silver	Bronze
10 m air pistol	Yukari Konishi; Japan	Otryadyn Gündegmaa; Mongolia	Heena Sidhu; India
10 m air pistol team	China; Che Xiaoting; Qian Wei; Wang Qian	India; Shri Nivetha Paramanantham; Heena Sidhu; Harveen Srao	Chinese Taipei; Huang Yu-jing; Wu Chia-ying; Yu Ai-wen
10 m air rifle	Shi Mengyao; China	Zhao Ruozhu; China	Adele Tan; Singapore
10 m air rifle team	China; Shi Mengyao; Wang Luyao; Zhao Ruozhu	India; Anjum Moudgil; Pooja Ghatkar; Meghana Sajjanar	Singapore; Lim Yee Xien; Jasmine Ser; Adele Tan

=== Mixed ===
Event	Gold	Silver	Bronze
10 m air pistol team	Japan; Tomoyuki Matsuda; Satoko Yamada	Vietnam; Hoàng Xuân Vinh; Lê Thị Linh Chi	Uzbekistan; Vladimir Svechnikov; Lenara Asanova
10 m air rifle team	China; Yang Haoran; Zhao Ruozhu	Japan; Atsushi Shimada; Ayano Shimizu	Kuwait; Abdullah Al-Harbi; Maryam Arzouqi

== Medal table ==
Rank	Nation	Gold	Silver	Bronze	Total
1	China	7	4	0	11
2	Japan	2	1	1	4
3	India	1	3	3	7
4	Vietnam	0	1	1	2
5	Mongolia	0	1	0	1
6	Singapore	0	0	2	2
7	Chinese Taipei	0	0	1	1
7	Kuwait	0	0	1	1
7	Uzbekistan	0	0	1	1
Totals (9 entries)		10	10	10	30
