= India at the 2021 Summer World University Games =

India at the 2021 World University Games
- IOC code: IND
- NOC: Association of Indian Universities (AIU)
- Website: www.aiu.ac.in

in Chengdu, China 28 July 2023 – 8 August 2023
- Competitors: 256 in 12 sports
- Medals Ranked 7th: Gold 11 Silver 5 Bronze 10 Total 26

Summer appearances
- 2021; 2025

India competed at the 2021 Summer World University Games in Chengdu, which took place from 28 July to 8 August 2023.

== Competitors ==
Sport	Men	Women	Total
Archery	6	6	12
Athletics	41	34	75
Badminton	6	6	12
Fencing	12	12	24
Judo	6	7	13
Shooting	11	9	20
Swimming	12	12	24
Table tennis	5	5	10
Taekwondo	13	13	26
Tennis	4	4	8
Volleyball	12	12	24

== Medalists ==
Med.	Name	Sport	Event	Date
1st place, gold medalist(s)	Manu Bhaker	Shooting	Women's 10m air pistol	29 July
1st place, gold medalist(s)	Elavenil Valarivan	Shooting	Women's 10m air rifle	29 July
1st place, gold medalist(s)	Manu Bhaker; Abhidnya Ashok Patil; Yashaswini Singh Deswal	Shooting	Women's 10m air pistol Team	29 July
1st place, gold medalist(s)	Aman Saini; Pragati Choudhary	Archery	Mixed compound team	30 July
1st place, gold medalist(s)	Aishwary Pratap Singh	Shooting	Men's 50m air rifle 3-positions	
1st place, gold medalist(s)	Avneet Kaur	Archery	Women's compound	
1st place, gold medalist(s)	Sangampreet Singh Bisla	Archery	Men's Compound	
1st place, gold medalist(s)	Aishwary Pratap Singh	Shooting	Men's 10m air rifle	
1st place, gold medalist(s)	Aishwary Pratap Singh; Arjun Babuta; Divyansh Singh Panwar	Shooting	Men's 10m air rifle team	
1st place, gold medalist(s)	Ashi Chouksey; Manini Kaushik; Sift Kaur Samra	Shooting	Women's 50m air rifle 3-positions team	
1st place, gold medalist(s)	Sift Kaur Samra	Shooting	Women's 50m air rifle 3-positions	
2nd place, silver medalist(s)	Avneet Kaur; Pragati Choudhary; Purvasha	Archery	Women's compound team	
2nd place, silver medalist(s)	Divyansh Singh Panwar	Shooting	Men's 10m air rifle	
2nd place, silver medalist(s)	Adarsh Singh; Udayveer Sidhu; Vijayveer Sidhu	Shooting	Men's 25m rapid fire pistol team	
2nd place, silver medalist(s)	Divyansh Singh Panwar; Elavenil Valarivan	Shooting	Mixed 10m air rifle	
2nd place, silver medalist(s)	Ashi Chouksey	Shooting	Women's 50m rifle 3-positions	
3rd place, bronze medalist(s)	Yamini Mourya	Judo	Women's −57 kg	29 July
3rd place, bronze medalist(s)	Aman Saini	Archery	Men's compound	
3rd place, bronze medalist(s)	Aishwary Pratap Singh Tomar; Sartaj Singh Tiwana; Surya Pratap Singh	Shooting	Men's 50m air rifle 3-positions team	
3rd place, bronze medalist(s)	Aman Saini; Rishabh Yadav; Sangampreet Singh Bisla	Archery	Men's compound team	
3rd place, bronze medalist(s)	Reeta Sawaiyan; Sangeeta Sangeeta; Tanisha Verma	Archery	Women's recurve team	
3rd place, bronze medalist(s)	Anmol Jain; Arjun Singh Cheema; Varun Tomar	Shooting	Men's 10m air pistol team	
3rd place, bronze medalist(s)	Bhavani Bhagavathi	Athletics	Women's long jump	August 2
3rd place, bronze medalist(s)	Amlan Borgohain	Athletics	Men's 200 metres	August 4
3rd place, bronze medalist(s)	Jyothi Yarraji	Athletics	Women's 100 m hurdles	August 4
3rd place, bronze medalist(s)	Pooja Kumawat; Nikita Lamba; Mansi Negi; Priyanka Goswami	Athletics	Women's 20 kilometres walk team	August 5

=== Medal by sports ===
Rank	Sports	Gold	Silver	Bronze	Total
1	Shooting	8	4	2	14
2	Archery	3	1	3	7
3	Athletics	0	0	4	4
4	Judo	0	0	1	1
Totals (4 entries)		11	5	10	26

== Archery ==
=== Compound ===
Athlete	Event	Ranking Round		Round of 64	Round of 32	Round of 16	Quarterfinals	Semifinals	Final / Bronze Medal	
Athlete	Event	Score	Seed	Opposition Score	Opposition Score	Opposition Score	Opposition Score	Opposition Score	Opposition Score	Rank
Aman Saini	Men's Individual	696	1	—N/a	(Singapore) Eer; W 146–140	(Iran) Pakzad; W 146–140	(India) Yadav; W 147–146	(India) Bisla; L 147^{10}–147^{10*}	(France) Bouleau; W 148–146	3rd place, bronze medalist(s)
Rishabh Yadav	Men's Individual	684	8	—N/a	(Hong Kong) Ngai; W 146–134	(Chinese Taipei) Wu; W 145–144	(India) Saini; L 146–147	Did not advance to next round		
Sangampreet Singh Bisla	Men's Individual	679	12	—N/a	(Hong Kong) Tsui; W 147–142	(South Korea) Park; W 145–142	(France) Cadronet; W 148–142	(India) Saini; W 147^{10*}–147^{10}	(South Africa) de Klerk; W 149–147	1st place, gold medalist(s)
Avneet Kaur	Women's Individual	677	5	—N/a	(Austria) Seidel; W 146–138	(Czech Republic) Zikmundova; W 143^{10}–143^{9}	(India) Pragati; W 145–144	(South Korea) Cho; W 146–143	(United States) Sturgill; W 144^{10}–144^{8}	1st place, gold medalist(s)
Pragati	Women's Individual	679	4	—N/a	(Singapore) Tan; W 141–129	(Italy) Bazzichetto; W 146–141	(India) Kaur; L 144–145	Did not advance to next round		
Purvasha Sudhir Shende	Women's Individual	672	11	—N/a	(United States) Sturgill; L 141–144	Did not advance to next round				
Aman Saini; Rishabh Yadav; Sangampreet Singh Bisla	Men's Team	2059	2	—N/a			Iran; W 231–225	China; L 227–228	South Korea; W 229–226	3rd place, bronze medalist(s)
Avneet Kaur; Purvasha Sudhir Shende; Pragati Pragati	Women's Team	2028	3	—N/a			United States; W 231–222	China; W 229–224	South Korea; L 224–229	2nd place, silver medalist(s)
Aman Saini; Pragati	Mixed Team	1375	2	—N/a			France; W 153–151	China; W 152–151	South Korea; W 157–156	1st place, gold medalist(s)

Recurve

Athlete	Event	Ranking Round		Round of 128	Round of 64	Round of 32	Round of 16	Quarterfinals	Semifinals	Final / Bronze Medal	
Athlete	Event	Score	Seed	Opposition Score	Opposition Score	Opposition Score	Opposition Score	Opposition Score	Opposition Score	Opposition Score	Rank
Akhil Samudrala	Men's Individual	654	19	—N/a	(Australia) Kuhrau; W 6–4	(India) Sachin Gupta; L 2–6	Did not advance to next round				
Sachin Gupta	Men's Individual	657	14	—N/a	(Mongolia) Namsrai; W 6–0	(India) Samudrala; W 6–2	(China) Feng; W 6–4	(Japan) Kawata; L 0–6	Did not advance to next round		
Sanjay Yashdeep Bhoge	Men's Individual	674	5	—N/a		(Hong Kong) Yip; W 6–2	(Turkey) Ak; L 5–6	Did not advance to next round			
Reeta Sawaiyan	Women's Individual	629	19	—N/a	(Poland) Naploszek; W 6–2	(Kazakhstan) Tursunbek; L 2–6	Did not advance to next round				
Sangeeta	Women's Individual	629	17	—N/a	(Switzerland) Fusek; W 6–0	(Germany) Klinger; W 7–3	(South Korea) Lee; L 0–6	Did not advance to next round			
Tanisha Verma	Women's Individual	598	32	—N/a	(Kazakhstan) Avdeyeva; W 6–2	(South Korea) Lee; L 5^{8}–6^{9}	Did not advance to next round				
Sanjay Yashdeep Bhoge; Sachin Gupta; Akhil Samudrala	Men's Team	1985	4	—N/a			Australia; W 6–0	Japan; W 5–1	South Korea; L 3–5	Italy; L 3–5	4
Sangeeta Sangeeta; Tanisha Verma; Reeta Sawaiyan	Women's Team	1856	6	—N/a			Malaysia; W 5–1	Chinese Taipei; W 5–4	China; L 4–5	France; W 5–4	3rd place, bronze medalist(s)
Sanjay Yashdeep Bhoge; Sangeeta Sangeeta	Mixed Team	1303	6	—N/a			Hong Kong; W 6–2	Japan; L 0–6	Did not advance to next round		

== Tennis ==
Singles

Athlete	Event	Round 1	Round 2	Round 3	Quarter-final	Semi-final	Final	Rank
Athlete	Event	Opposition Score	Opposition Score	Opposition Score	Opposition Score	Opposition Score	Opposition Score	Rank
Karuna Jayan Sangheeth	Men's Singles							
Jaya Prakash Oges Theyjo	Men's Singles							
Hans Kabir	Men's Singles							
Bathrinath Lohithaksha	Men's Singles							

== Shooting ==
=== Men ===
Individual

Athlete	Event	Qualification		Final	
Athlete	Event	Score	Rank	Score	Rank
Arjun Babuta	10m Air Rifle	632.3	2Q	124.4	8
Aishwary Pratap Singh Tomar	10m Air Rifle	631.7	3Q	252.6	1st place, gold medalist(s)
Divyansh Singh Panwar	10m Air Rifle	630.7	4Q	251.0	2nd place, silver medalist(s)
Aishwary Pratap Singh Tomar	50m Rifle 3 Positions	1184-79X	2Q	461.7	1st place, gold medalist(s)
Sartaj Singh Tiwana	50m Rifle 3 Positions	1160-49X	19	Did not advance	
Surya Pratap Singh	50m Rifle 3 Positions	1158-53X	22	Did not advance	
Varun Tomar	10m Air Pistol	582-22X	3Q	136.2	7
Arjun Singh Cheema	10m Air Pistol	575-15X	13	Did not advance	
Adarsh Singh	10m Air Pistol	573-20X	15	Did not advance	
Vijayveer Sidhu	25 Meters rapid fire pistol	583-22X	3Q	20^{3}	4
Udayveer Sidhu	25 Meters rapid fire pistol	574-22X	9	Did not advance	
Adarsh Singh	25 Meters rapid fire pistol	572-15X	13	Did not advance	

Team

Athlete	Event	Qualification		Final	
Athlete	Event	Score	Rank	Score	Rank
Arjun Babuta; Aishwary Pratap Singh Tomar; Divyansh Panwar	10 meters air rifle Team	—N/a		1894.7	1st place, gold medalist(s)
Surya Pratap Singh; Satraj Singh Tiwana; Aishwary Pratap Tomar	50 Meters 3 Position rifle Team	—N/a		3502-181X	3rd place, bronze medalist(s)
Udayveer Sidhu; Vijayveer Sidhu; Adarsh Singh	25 Meters rapid fire pistol Team	—N/a		1729-59X	2nd place, silver medalist(s)

=== Women ===
Individual

Athlete	Event	Qualification		Final	
Athlete	Event	Score	Rank	Score	Rank
Elavenil Valarivan	10m Air Rifle	630.0	5Q	252.5	1st place, gold medalist(s)
Ayushi Podder	10m Air Rifle	625.3	26	Did not advance	
Manini Kaushik	10m Air Rifle	620.6	45	Did not advance	
Sift Kaur Samra	50m Rifle 3 Positions	1186-78X	1Q	252.5	1st place, gold medalist(s)
Ashi Chouksey	50m Rifle 3 Positions	1174-67X	5Q	Did not advance	
Manini Kaushik	50m Rifle 3 Positions	1173-61X	7Q	Did not advance	
Manu Bhaker	10m Air Pistol	—N/a		239.7	1st place, gold medalist(s)
Yashaswini Singh Deshwal	10m Air Pistol	—N/a		193.5	4

Team

Athlete	Event	Qualification		Final	
Athlete	Event	Score	Rank	Score	Rank
Ashok Abhidnya Patil; Yashaswini Singh Deshwal; Manu Bhaker	Women's team 10 meters air pistol	—N/a		1714-52X	1st place, gold medalist(s)
Ayushi Podder; Manini Kaushik; Elavenil Valarivan	Women's team 10 meters air rifle	—N/a		1875.9	8

== Volleyball ==
Event	Group stage				Quarterfinal	Semifinal	Final / BM	
Event	Opposition Score	Opposition Score	Opposition Score	Rank	Opposition Score	Opposition Score	Opposition Score	Rank
Men's Team	Argentina; L 0–3	Iran; L 0–3	Czech Republic; W 3–1	3	9th–16th qfs. Brazil; L 2–3	13th–16th sfs. Hong Kong; W 3–1	13th place match Czech Republic; L 0–3	14
Women's Team	Hong Kong; L 0–3	Italy; L 0–3	—N/a	3	—N/a	9th–12th sfs. Chinese Taipei; L 0–3	11th place match Colombia; L 0–3	12
