= Shooting at the 2022 Asian Games – Men's 25 metre rapid fire pistol team =

Men's 25 metre rapid fire pistol team at the 2022 Asian Games
- Venue: Fuyang Yinhu Sports Centre
- Dates: 24–25 September 2023
- Competitors: 24 from 8 nations

Medalists
gold medal	China; Li Yuehong, Liu Yangpan, Wang Xinjie
silver medal	South Korea; Kim Seo-jun, Lee Gun-hyeok, Song Jong-ho
bronze medal	India; Anish Bhanwala, Vijayveer Sidhu, Adarsh Singh

The men's 25 metre rapid fire pistol team competition at the 2022 Asian Games in Hangzhou, China was held on 24 and 25 September 2023 at the Fuyang Yinhu Sports Centre.

== Schedule ==
All times are China Standard Time (UTC+08:00)

Date	Time	Event
Sunday, 24 September 2023	09:00	Stage 1
Monday, 25 September 2023	09:00	Stage 2

== Records ==
Prior to this competition, the existing world, Asian and Games records were as follows.

World Record	China	1756	Changwon, South Korea	10 September 2018
Asian Record	China	1756	Changwon, South Korea	10 September 2018
Games Record	South Korea	1747	Incheon, South Korea	24 September 2014

== Results ==
Rank	Team	Stage 1			Stage 2			Total	Xs	Notes
Rank	Team	8	6	4	8	6	4	Total	Xs	Notes
1st place, gold medalist(s)	China (CHN)	299	295	289	297	294	291	1765	63	WR
	Li Yuehong	100	99	97	99	98	97	590	23	
	Liu Yangpan	99	99	95	99	98	98	588	19	
	Wang Xinjie	100	97	97	99	98	96	587	21	
2nd place, silver medalist(s)	South Korea (KOR)	296	289	285	293	288	283	1734	56	
	Kim Seo-jun	97	95	96	97	97	96	578	14	
	Lee Gun-hyeok	100	97	94	99	96	90	576	22	
	Song Jong-ho	99	97	95	97	95	97	580	20	
3rd place, bronze medalist(s)	India (IND)	292	290	286	289	285	276	1718	45	
	Anish Bhanwala	98	98	96	94	90	84	560	14	
	Vijayveer Sidhu	99	97	93	99	98	96	582	18	
	Adarsh Singh	95	95	97	96	97	96	576	13	
4	Indonesia (INA)	291	286	283	286	290	282	1718	37	
	Totok Tri Martanto	93	96	96	93	97	94	569	12	
	Dewa Putu Yadi Suteja	98	94	90	96	94	93	565	9	
	Anang Yulianto	100	96	97	97	99	95	584	16	
5	Vietnam (VIE)	292	292	277	290	286	278	1715	43	
	Hà Minh Thành	97	99	96	96	98	92	578	15	
	Phan Xuân Chuyên	97	97	84	97	94	93	562	14	
	Vũ Tiến Nam	98	96	97	97	94	93	575	14	
6	Japan (JPN)	294	287	259	293	291	280	1704	53	
	Hiroyoshi Ichikawa	99	95	94	98	98	94	578	15	
	Eita Mori	96	94	82	95	96	94	557	14	
	Dai Yoshioka	99	98	83	100	97	92	569	24	
7	Thailand (THA)	290	284	274	292	282	280	1702	39	
	Sriyanon Karndee	95	93	92	97	90	92	559	11	
	Theethat Praditsudswat	98	96	93	99	98	97	581	15	
	Schwakon Triniphakorn	97	95	89	96	94	91	562	13	
8	Kazakhstan (KAZ)	293	295	270	289	279	266	1692	48	
	Nikita Chiryukin	100	99	94	99	95	94	581	20	
	Artemiy Kabakov	96	97	89	98	93	83	556	17	
	Ruslan Yunusmetov	97	99	87	92	91	89	555	11	
