= Shooting at the 2014 Asian Games – Men's 25 metre rapid fire pistol team =

Men's 25 metre rapid fire pistol team at the 2014 Asian Games
- Venue: Ongnyeon International Shooting Range
- Dates: 23–24 September 2014
- Competitors: 18 from 6 nations

Medalists
gold medal	South Korea; Jang Dae-kyu, Kim Jun-hong, Song Jong-ho
silver medal	China; Hu Haozhe, Li Yuehong, Zhang Jian
bronze medal	Vietnam; Bùi Quang Nam, Hà Minh Thành, Kiều Thanh Tú

The men's 25 metre rapid fire pistol team competition at the 2014 Asian Games in Incheon, South Korea was held on 23 and 24 September at the Ongnyeon International Shooting Range.

== Schedule ==
All times are Korea Standard Time (UTC+09:00)

Date	Time	Event
Tuesday, 23 September 2014	09:00	Stage 1
Wednesday, 24 September 2014	09:00	Stage 2

== Records ==
Prior to this competition, the existing world, Asian and Games records were as follows.

World Record	China	1749	Munich, Germany	6 August 2010
Asian Record	China	1749	Munich, Germany	6 August 2010
Games Record	China	1745	Guangzhou, China	15 November 2010

== Results ==
Rank	Team	Stage 1			Stage 2			Total	Xs	Notes
Rank	Team	8	6	4	8	6	4	Total	Xs	Notes
1st place, gold medalist(s)	South Korea (KOR)	294	293	288	296	290	286	1747	45	GR
	Jang Dae-kyu	97	99	97	98	96	95	582	16	
	Kim Jun-hong	99	98	94	99	95	96	581	15	
	Song Jong-ho	98	96	97	99	99	95	584	14	
2nd place, silver medalist(s)	China (CHN)	292	295	289	294	290	286	1746	67	
	Hu Haozhe	96	97	97	98	97	94	579	20	
	Li Yuehong	98	100	97	98	98	95	586	33	
	Zhang Jian	98	98	95	98	95	97	581	14	
3rd place, bronze medalist(s)	Vietnam (VIE)	291	288	271	292	282	280	1704	41	
	Bùi Quang Nam	97	94	85	98	92	97	563	13	
	Hà Minh Thành	98	97	92	99	96	94	576	15	
	Kiều Thanh Tú	96	97	94	95	94	89	565	13	
4	India (IND)	294	290	267	287	288	278	1704	39	
	Gurpreet Singh	97	98	89	98	97	91	570	13	
	Harpreet Singh	98	99	93	98	97	93	578	16	
	Pemba Tamang	99	93	85	91	94	94	556	10	
5	Thailand (THA)	294	279	267	283	285	278	1686	38	
	Aekkata Attanon	99	92	94	96	95	89	565	16	
	Sriyanon Karndee	98	92	90	93	95	92	560	10	
	Vorapol Kulchairattana	97	95	83	94	95	97	561	12	
6	Qatar (QAT)	290	286	263	283	285	254	1661	34	
	Oleg Engachev	100	97	90	98	96	89	570	15	
	Riaz Khan	96	92	89	91	94	80	542	13	
	Azizjon Mukhamedrakhimov	94	97	84	94	95	85	549	6	
