= Pakistan at the 2020 Summer Olympics =

- IOC code: PAK
- NOC: National Olympic Committee of Pakistan
- Website: www.nocpakistan.org

in Tokyo, Japan July 23, 2021 – August 8, 2021
- Competitors: 10 in 6 sports
- Flag bearers (opening): Mahoor Shahzad; Muhammad Khalil Akhtar
- Flag bearer (closing): Arshad Nadeem
- Medals: Gold 0 Silver 0 Bronze 0 Total 0

Summer Olympics appearances (overview)
- 1948; 1952; 1956; 1960; 1964; 1968; 1972; 1976; 1980; 1984; 1988; 1992; 1996; 2000; 2004; 2008; 2012; 2016; 2020; 2024

Pakistan competed at the 2020 Summer Olympics in Tokyo. Originally scheduled to take place from 24 July to 9 August 2020, the Games were postponed to 23 July to 8 August 2021, because of the COVID-19 pandemic. It was Pakistan's eighteenth appearance at the Summer Olympics.

This Olympics was Pakistan's best performance since 2000 with both Talha Talib & Arshad Nadeem reaching the finals of their respective events. Gulfam Joseph also barely missed out on reaching the final of his event.

== Competitors ==
Sport	Men	Women	Total
Athletics	1	1	2
Badminton	0	1	1
Judo	1	0	1
Shooting	3	0	3
Swimming	1	1	2
Weightlifting	1	0	1
Total	7	3	10

== Athletics ==
Pakistani athletes further achieved the entry standards, either by qualifying time or by world ranking, in the following track and field events (up to a maximum of 3 athletes in each event):

Key

- Note–Ranks given for track events are within the athlete's heat only
- Q = Qualified for the next round
- q = Qualified for the next round as a fastest loser or, in field events, by position without achieving the qualifying target
- NR = National record
- N/A = Round not applicable for the event
- Bye = Athlete not required to compete in round

Track & road events

Athlete	Event	Heat		Semifinal		Final	
Athlete	Event	Result	Rank	Result	Rank	Result	Rank
Najma Parveen	Women's 200 m	28.12	7	did not advance			

Field events

Athlete	Event	Qualification		Final	
Athlete	Event	Distance	Position	Distance	Position
Arshad Nadeem	Men's javelin throw	85.16	3 Q	84.62	5

== Badminton ==
For the first time in history, Pakistan entered one badminton player into the Olympic tournament. Mahoor Shahzad accepted the invitation from the Tripartite Commission and the Badminton World Federation to compete in the women's singles.

Athlete	Event	Group Stage			Elimination	Quarterfinal	Semifinal	Final / BM	
Athlete	Event	Opposition Score	Opposition Score	Rank	Opposition Score	Opposition Score	Opposition Score	Opposition Score	Rank
Mahoor Shahzad	Women's singles	Yamaguchi (JPN); L (3–21, 8–21)	Gilmour (GBR); L (14–21, 14– 21)	3	Did not advance				

== Judo ==
Pakistan qualified one judoka for the men's half-heavyweight category (100 kg) at the Games. Rio 2016 Olympian Shah Hussain Shah accepted a continental berth from the Asian zone as the nation's top-ranked judoka outside of direct qualifying position in the IJF World Ranking List of June 28, 2021.

Athlete	Event	Round of 32	Round of 16	Quarterfinals	Semifinals	Repechage	Final / BM	
Athlete	Event	Opposition Result	Opposition Result	Opposition Result	Opposition Result	Opposition Result	Opposition Result	Rank
Shah Hussain Shah	Men's −100 kg	Darwish (EGY); L 00–10	did not advance					

== Shooting ==
Pakistani shooters achieved quota places for the following events by virtue of their best finishes at the 2018 ISSF World Championships, the 2019 ISSF World Cup series, and Asian Championships, as long as they obtained a minimum qualifying score (MQS) by May 31, 2020.

Athlete	Event	Qualification		Final	
Athlete	Event	Points	Rank	Points	Rank
Muhammad Khalil Akhtar	Men's 25 m rapid fire pistol	572	15	did not advance	
Ghulam Mustafa Bashir	Men's 25 m rapid fire pistol	579	10	did not advance	
Gulfam Joseph	Men's 10 m air pistol	578	9	did not advance	

== Swimming ==
Pakistan received a universality invitation from FINA to send two top-ranked swimmers (one per gender) in their respective individual events to the Olympics, based on the FINA Points System of June 28, 2021.

Athlete	Event	Heat		Semifinal		Final	
Athlete	Event	Time	Rank	Time	Rank	Time	Rank
Muhammad Haseeb Tariq	Men's 100 m freestyle	53.81	62	did not advance			
Bisma Khan	Women's 50 m freestyle	27.78	56	did not advance			

== Weightlifting ==
Pakistan received an invitation from the Tripartite Commission and the IWF to send Talha Talib in the men's 67-kg category to the Olympics, marking the country's return to the sport for the first time since 1976.

Athlete	Event	Snatch		Clean & Jerk		Total	Rank
Athlete	Event	Result	Rank	Result	Rank	Total	Rank
Talha Talib	Men's –67 kg	150	2	170	7	320	5

== Non-competing sports ==
=== Equestrian ===
For the first time in history, Pakistan qualified one eventing rider into the Olympic equestrian competition, by finishing in the top two, outside the group selection, of the individual FEI Olympic Rankings for Group F (Africa and Middle East). In September 2020, Azad Kashmir, who Usman Khan rode when he qualified, died after suffering a severe heart attack. Athletes and their horse qualify as a pair for the Olympics, leaving Khan's place at the Games in doubt.

In 2021, Khan attempted to qualify aboard a new horse Kasheer, but failed to obtain the minimum eligibility requirements at the Sydney International Three-Day Event in May. The following outcome implied that he would not be eligible to start at the Olympics. Attempting to obtain the minimum requirements on back-to-back weeks was against the regulations set by FEI, Khan competed the week after Sydney at an event in Naracoorte, where he suffered a rotational fall which resulted in the passing of Kasheer.
