= Zhang Yu (sport shooter) =

Chinese sport shooter

Personal information
- Nationality: Chinese
- Born: 19 April 2000 (age 26)

Sport
- Sport: Sports shooting
Medal record
Women's shooting
Representing China
World Championships
Gold medal – first place	2022 Cairo	10m air rifle team
Bronze medal – third place	2022 Cairo	10 metre air rifle
Bronze medal – third place	2022 Cairo	10 m air rifle mixed team
World University Games
Gold medal – first place	2021 Chengdu	10 m air rifle mixed team
Bronze medal – third place	2021 Chengdu	10 m air rifle team

Zhang Yu (born 19 April 2000) is a Chinese sports shooter.
