= Palak Gulia =

Indian sport shooter (born 2005)

Personal information
- Born: 9 November 2005 (age 20) Nimana, Haryana, India

Sport
- Sport: Shooting
- Event: 10 m air pistol

Achievements and titles
- Personal bests: 242.1 AGR (2023)
Medal record
Women's 10 m air pistol shooting
Representing India
Asian Games
Gold medal – first place	2022 Hangzhou	Individual
Silver medal – second place	2022 Hangzhou	Team
Asian Championships
Silver medal – second place	2022 Daegu	Individual
Silver medal – second place	2022 Daegu	Team
Bronze medal – third place	2025 Shymkent	Team
World University Championships
Gold medal – first place	2024 New Delhi	Mixed team
Gold medal – first place	2024 New Delhi	Team
Silver medal – second place	2024 New Delhi	Individual

Palak Gulia (born 9 November 2005) is an Indian sport shooter who specializes in the 10 m air pistol event.

== Early life ==
Palak hails from Nimana village in Jhajjar district, Haryana. She started shooting as a hobby before taking up the sport seriously at the age of 13 years, at the Faridabad shooting range under coach Rakesh Singh. Her father Joginder Singh is a businessman and she has two younger siblings, twins, a brother and a sister. Her father shifted the family from Gurugram to Faridabad to support her training. She took up pistol event, since her coach coaches only in that discipline.

== Asian Games record ==
Palak set the Asian Games record of 242.1 points in the 10m air pistol final on September 29. After recovering from a shoulder injury last year, she start her preparations for the Asian Games in mid 2022. She started travelling with her coach to the two ranges in Ballabgarh and Faridabad where his coach Rakesh Singh used to run academies. She increased her daily shots to 200 and focussed on her mental health. In the 2022 Asian Games qualification, she finished 7th and squeezed into the final eight. In the finals, she stood third scoring 49.9 after the first series as she dropped two of the five shots below 10. Her roommate in the Games Village, Esha Singh, was leading and after the second series, Palak took up second spot with 50.8 points. In the elimination stage, she took the lead beating Esha by 2.4 points and set a New Asian Games record. She also won a silver medal in the 10m air pistol team event along with Divya T. S. and Esha Singh.

== Career ==
Palak won the Asian Games gold in the 10m air pistol with an Asian Games record and added another silver in the team event. India won both gold and silver in the women 10m air pistol event with Esha Singh finishing second. She trains with the support of Reliance Foundation.

In June 2023, Palak won the gold in the 10m air pistol event in the 21st Kumar Surendra Singh pistol championship at the Madhya Pradesh Academy in Bhopal. Later in August, she took part in the team event at the ISSF World Shooting Championships at Baku, Azerbaijan, a qualifying event for Olympics but failed to make the mark.

Earlier in 2022, she was part of the Indian women team that won silver in the 10m air pistol team event at the Shotgun and Rifle/Pistol World Championships in Cairo, Egypt. On 11 May 2022, she won gold at the ISSF Junior Cup in Suhl, Germany.

In 2021, she finished 6th in the 10m air pistol and 4th in the junior class but missed the finals due to malfunction.
