= Udhayveer Sidhu =

Indian sport shooter

Personal information
- Nationality: Indian
- Born: 21 June 2002 (age 24) Mansa, Punjab, India
- Occupation: Shooter

Sport
- Country: India
- Sport: Shooting
- Events: 25 meter rapid fire pistol, 25 meter pistol, 25 meter standard pistol 10 meter air pistol
Medal record
Representing India
Men's Pistol shooting
ISSF World Championship
Gold medal – first place	2018 Changwon	25m Pistol Jr. Men (Teams)
Gold medal – first place	2018 Changwon	25m Pistol Jr. Men
Gold medal – first place	2022 Cairo	25m Standard Pistol Jr. Men
Gold medal – first place	2022 Cairo	25m Pistol Jr. Men
Bronze medal – third place	2022 Cairo	25m Rapid Fire Jr. Men (Teams)
Asian Shooting Championships
Gold medal – first place	2019 Doha	25m Standard Pistol Men (Teams)
Silver medal – second place	2019 Doha	25m Standard Pistol Men
ISSF Junior World Championships
Gold medal – first place	2021 Lima	25m Standard Pistol
ISSF Junior World Cup
Gold medal – first place	2019 Suhl	25 m Standard Pistol
Gold medal – first place	2019 Suhl	25 m Standard Pistol (Teams)
Gold medal – first place	2018 Suhl	25 m Pistol (Teams)
Silver medal – second place	2022 Suhl	25 m Standard Pistol Mixed Team
Bronze medal – third place	2019 Suhl	25 m Rapid Fire Pistol
Bronze medal – third place	2018 Suhl	25 m Pistol
World University Games
Silver medal – second place	2021 Chengdu	25 m rapid fire pistol team

Udhayveer Sidhu is an Indian sport shooter who competes in the 25 meter rapid fire pistol, 25 meter pistol, 25 meter standard pistol and 10 meter air pistol. He won a twenty plus international medals representing India. He is in the Indian Shooting Team since 2018. In 2018 ISSF Junior World Cup he won the 25m pistol bronze at the Junior World Cup in Suhl, Germany, and he and his twin brother Vijayveer Sidhu, along with Raj Kanwar Singh, claimed the Indian team's historic gold medal in the event with a world record score of 1747. He won two golds in 2018 ISSF World Shooting Championships. In 2019 he won two golds and a bronze in 2019 ISSF Junior World Cup and later at 2019 Asian Shooting Championships in 25 meter standard pistol he won a gold and a silver. In 2021 at 2021 ISSF Junior World Championships he won an individual gold. In 2022 at ISSF Junior World Cup held at Suhl, Germany he won the silver in 25 meter standard pistol open junior mixed team and later at 2022 ISSF World Shooting Championships he won two golds and a bronze.
