= Shooting at the 2010 Asian Games – Men's 25 metre rapid fire pistol team =

Men's 25 metre rapid fire pistol team at the 2010 Asian Games
- Venue: Aoti Shooting Range
- Dates: 15 November 2010
- Competitors: 18 from 6 nations

Medalists
gold medal	China; Ding Feng, Li Yuehong, Zhang Jian
silver medal	South Korea; Cha Sang-jun, Hong Seong-hwan, Hwang Yoon-sam
bronze medal	Vietnam; Bùi Quang Nam, Hà Minh Thành, Phạm Anh Đạt

The men's 25 metre rapid fire pistol team competition at the 2010 Asian Games in Guangzhou, China was held on 15 November at the Aoti Shooting Range.

== Schedule ==
All times are China Standard Time (UTC+08:00)

Date	Time	Event
Monday, 15 November 2010	09:00	Stage 1
Monday, 15 November 2010	12:30	Stage 2

== Records ==
Prior to this competition, the existing world, Asian and Games records were as follows.

World Record	China	1749	Munich, Germany	6 August 2010
Asian Record	China	1749	Munich, Germany	6 August 2010
Games Record	China	1738	Doha, Qatar	6 December 2006

== Results ==
Rank	Team	Stage 1			Stage 2			Total	Xs	Notes
Rank	Team	8	6	4	8	6	4	Total	Xs	Notes
1st place, gold medalist(s)	China (CHN)	294	292	286	292	295	286	1745	47	GR
	Ding Feng	100	93	97	96	99	95	580	11	
	Li Yuehong	99	99	93	99	97	96	583	25	
	Zhang Jian	95	100	96	97	99	95	582	11	
2nd place, silver medalist(s)	South Korea (KOR)	290	295	285	291	288	279	1728	59	
	Cha Sang-jun	96	98	96	98	95	94	577	19	
	Hong Seong-hwan	95	99	92	95	97	94	572	17	
	Hwang Yoon-sam	99	98	97	98	96	91	579	14	
3rd place, bronze medalist(s)	Vietnam (VIE)	289	288	275	296	291	279	1718	45	
	Bùi Quang Nam	95	95	89	99	98	93	569	9	
	Hà Minh Thành	98	98	94	99	99	95	583	21	
	Phạm Anh Đạt	96	95	92	98	94	91	566	15	
4	India (IND)	295	289	271	291	295	270	1711	64	
	Vijay Kumar	98	97	91	97	99	86	568	22	
	Rahul Panwar	98	93	96	95	97	93	572	16	
	Gurpreet Singh	99	99	84	99	99	91	571	26	
5	Thailand (THA)	281	275	261	288	280	271	1656	37	
	Sriyanon Karndee	90	85	83	98	87	89	532	8	
	Pongpol Kulchairattana	96	97	89	96	97	94	569	21	
	Opas Ruengpanyawut	95	93	89	94	96	88	555	8	
6	Macau (MAC)	277	279	237	284	281	255	1613	23	
	Chio Hong Chi	93	89	73	94	94	89	532	8	
	Chiu Kin Chong	92	96	83	93	93	83	540	8	
	Leong Chi Kin	92	94	81	97	94	83	541	7	
