= Xiong Yaxuan =

Chinese sport shooter

Personal information
- Nationality: Chinese
- Born: 25 September 1996 (age 29) Nanchang, China

Sport
- Sport: Shooting
Medal record
Women's shooting
Representing China
Asian Championships
Silver medal – second place	2019 Doha	25 m pistol team
World University Games
Gold medal – first place	2021 Chengdu	25 m pistol team
Bronze medal – third place	2021 Chengdu	25 m pistol

Xiong Yaxuan is a Chinese sport shooter. She represents China at the 2020 Summer Olympics in Tokyo.
