= Shooting at the 2010 Asian Games – Men's 25 metre rapid fire pistol =

Men's 25 metre rapid fire pistol at the 2010 Asian Games
- Venue: Aoti Shooting Range
- Dates: 15 November 2010
- Competitors: 26 from 12 nations

Medalists
gold medal	Li Yuehong	China
silver medal	Hà Minh Thành	Vietnam
bronze medal	Zhang Jian	China

The men's 25 metre rapid fire pistol competition at the 2010 Asian Games in Guangzhou, China was held on 15 November at the Aoti Shooting Range.

== Schedule ==
All times are China Standard Time (UTC+08:00)

Date	Time	Event
Monday, 15 November 2010	09:00	Qualification stage 1
Monday, 15 November 2010	12:30	Qualification stage 2
Monday, 15 November 2010	16:00	Final

== Records ==
Prior to this competition, the existing world, Asian and Games records were as follows.

Qualification
World Record	Aleksey Klimov (RUS)	591	Granada, Spain	6 October 2006
Asian Record	Ding Feng (CHN)	589	Fort Benning, United States	27 May 2010
Games Record	Zhang Penghui (CHN)	580	Doha, Qatar	6 December 2006
Final
World Record	Christian Reitz (GER)	794.0	Milan, Italy	28 May 2008
Asian Record	Zhang Penghui (CHN)	788.2	Sydney, Australia	30 April 2007
Games Record	Liu Zhongsheng (CHN)	778.4	Doha, Qatar	6 December 2006

== Results ==
Legend

- DNS — Did not start

=== Qualification ===
Rank	Athlete	Stage 1			Stage 2			Total	Xs	S-off	Notes
Rank	Athlete	8	6	4	8	6	4	Total	Xs	S-off	Notes
1	Li Yuehong (CHN)	99	99	93	99	97	96	583	25		GR
2	Hà Minh Thành (VIE)	98	98	94	99	99	95	583	21		GR
3	Zhang Jian (CHN)	95	100	96	97	99	95	582	11		
4	Ding Feng (CHN)	100	93	97	96	99	95	580	11		
5	Teruyoshi Akiyama (JPN)	94	98	97	96	97	97	579	23	47	
6	Hwang Yoon-sam (KOR)	99	98	97	98	96	91	579	14	46	
7	Hafiz Adzha (MAS)	98	96	95	98	96	96	579	17	45	
8	Cha Sang-jun (KOR)	96	98	96	98	95	94	577	19		
9	Hong Seong-hwan (KOR)	95	99	92	95	97	94	572	17		
10	Rahul Panwar (IND)	98	93	96	95	97	93	572	16		
11	Gurpreet Singh (IND)	99	99	84	99	99	91	571	26		
12	Hasli Izwan (MAS)	98	97	95	97	95	89	571	14		
13	Wong Fai (HKG)	95	96	94	98	97	91	571	12		
14	Li Hao Jian (HKG)	99	94	95	95	93	95	571	10		
15	Pongpol Kulchairattana (THA)	96	97	89	96	97	94	569	21		
16	Bùi Quang Nam (VIE)	95	95	89	99	98	93	569	9		
17	Vijay Kumar (IND)	98	97	91	97	99	86	568	22		
18	Nathaniel Padilla (PHI)	99	97	89	97	100	86	568	16		
19	Phạm Anh Đạt (VIE)	96	95	92	98	94	91	566	15		
20	Reza Karimpour (IRI)	99	95	83	98	92	88	555	14		
21	Opas Ruengpanyawut (THA)	95	93	89	94	96	88	555	8		
22	Leong Chi Kin (MAC)	92	94	81	97	94	83	541	7		
23	Chiu Kin Chong (MAC)	92	96	83	93	93	83	540	8		
24	Chio Hong Chi (MAC)	93	89	73	94	94	89	532	8		
25	Sriyanon Karndee (THA)	90	85	83	98	87	89	532	8		
—	Ashban Sulaiman (BRN)							DNS			

=== Final ===
Rank	Athlete	Qual.	Final											Total	S-off	Notes
Rank	Athlete	Qual.	1	2	3	4	5	6	7	8	9	10	Total	Total	S-off	Notes
1st place, gold medalist(s)	Li Yuehong (CHN)	583	9.9	10.1	9.5	10.1	10.7	10.3	10.7	10.1	9.3	8.7	199.8	782.8		GR
1st place, gold medalist(s)	Li Yuehong (CHN)	583	10.0	10.7	9.6	10.0	10.7	9.0	10.5	10.3	10.2	9.4	199.8	782.8		GR
2nd place, silver medalist(s)	Hà Minh Thành (VIE)	583	9.5	9.9	9.7	10.7	9.5	8.7	9.5	10.4	10.8	10.0	196.7	779.7		
2nd place, silver medalist(s)	Hà Minh Thành (VIE)	583	9.8	10.4	8.9	9.7	9.8	10.0	10.2	10.3	9.3	9.6	196.7	779.7		
3rd place, bronze medalist(s)	Zhang Jian (CHN)	582	9.8	10.5	10.3	10.9	10.6	9.0	9.0	10.3	10.8	9.7	196.2	778.2		
3rd place, bronze medalist(s)	Zhang Jian (CHN)	582	9.5	9.3	10.6	9.9	10.1	8.8	8.9	10.1	9.4	8.7	196.2	778.2		
4	Hwang Yoon-sam (KOR)	579	8.6	9.6	10.2	9.6	10.7	9.7	10.1	10.2	10.4	9.0	198.8	777.8		
4	Hwang Yoon-sam (KOR)	579	10.2	10.7	10.3	10.1	10.2	9.6	10.7	8.9	10.1	9.9	198.8	777.8		
5	Ding Feng (CHN)	580	9.6	10.2	10.5	10.3	9.6	10.2	9.8	8.7	10.1	10.4	196.2	776.2		
5	Ding Feng (CHN)	580	10.0	10.2	10.8	9.3	9.7	10.0	7.9	9.5	9.6	9.8	196.2	776.2		
6	Teruyoshi Akiyama (JPN)	579	9.7	8.3	9.6	8.5	10.2	9.5	10.0	9.1	10.4	9.8	194.5	773.5		
6	Teruyoshi Akiyama (JPN)	579	10.2	10.2	10.3	10.0	9.9	8.0	10.0	10.2	10.2	10.4	194.5	773.5		
