= Zhang Bingchen =

Chinese sport shooter (born 1997)

Personal information
- Nationality: Chinese
- Born: 23 November 1997 (age 28)

Sport
- Country: China
- Sport: Shooting
- Event: Air pistol
Medal record
Men's shooting
Representing China
World Championships
Silver medal – second place	2026 Doha	50 m team pistol
Bronze medal – third place	2018 Changwon	50 m team pistol
World University Games
Silver medal – second place	2021 Chengdu	10 m air pistol team

Zhang Bingchen (born 23 November 1997) is a Chinese sport shooter.

He participated at the 2018 ISSF World Shooting Championships, winning a medal.
