= Song Buhan =

Chinese sport shooter (born 1997)

Personal information
- Nationality: Chinese
- Born: 10 January 1997 (age 29) Liaoning, China
- Height: 1.65 m (5 ft 5 in)
- Weight: 69 kg (152 lb)

Sport
- Country: China
- Sport: Shooting
- Event: Air rifle
Medal record
Men's shooting
Representing China
World Championships
Silver medal – second place	2018 Changwon	Mixed 10 m air rifle
Silver medal – second place	2022 Cairo	10 metre air rifle team
Asian Championships
Gold medal – first place	2019 Doha	10 m air rifle team
Bronze medal – third place	2019 Doha	10 m air rifle mixed team
World University Games
Gold medal – first place	2021 Chengdu	10m air rifle mixed team
Silver medal – second place	2021 Chengdu	10m air rifle team
Bronze medal – third place	2021 Chengdu	10m air rifle

Song Buhan (born 10 January 1997) is a Chinese sport shooter.

He participated at the 2018 ISSF World Shooting Championships.
