= Shi Mengyao =

Chinese sport shooter

Personal information
- Nationality: Chinese
- Born: 5 January 1998 (age 28) Henan, China

Sport
- Sport: Shooting
Medal record
Asian Championships
Gold medal – first place	2019 Doha	50 m rifle 3 positions
Gold medal – first place	2019 Doha	50 m rifle 3 positions team
World University Games
Silver medal – second place	2021 Chengdu	50 me rifle 3 positions team

Shi Mengyao is a Chinese sport shooter. She represents China at the 2020 Summer Olympics in Tokyo.
