= Shooting at the 2018 Commonwealth Games – Men's 25 metre rapid fire pistol =

Shooting – Men's 25 metre rapid fire pistol at the 2018 Commonwealth Games
- Venue: Belmont Shooting Centre
- Dates: 12–13 April 2018
- Competitors: 13 from 10 nations

Medalists
gold medal	Anish Bhanwala	India
silver medal	Sergei Evglevski	Australia
bronze medal	Sam Gowin	England

The qualification round of Men's 25 metre rapid fire pistol event was held on 12 and 13 April 2018 at the Belmont Shooting Centre, while the final was held on 13 April 2018 at the same place. Anish Bhanwala from India won the gold medal while Sergei Evglevski from Australia won the silver medal.

== Results ==
=== Qualification ===
Rank	Athlete	Country	Stage 1					Stage 2					Total
Rank	Athlete	Country	1	2	ex 200	3	Result	1	2	ex 200	3	Result	Total
1	Anish Bhanwala	India	98	98	196	90	286-11x	99	99	198	96	294-11x	580-22x Q
2	Neeraj Kumar	India	97	100	197	94	291-7x	98	98	196	92	288-7x	579-14x Q
3	Sergei Evglevski	Australia	97	96	193	92	285-7x	100	98	198	93	291-4x	576-11x Q
4	Muhammad Khalil Akhtar	Pakistan	97	99	196	90	286-8x	99	94	193	92	285-6x	571-14x Q
5	Sam Gowin	England	98	96	194	93	287-8x	98	94	192	89	281-3x	568-11x Q
6	David Chapman	Australia	96	96	192	87	279-4x	99	96	195	92	287-11x	566-15x Q
7	Hasli Izwan Amir Hasan	Malaysia	96	93	189	92	281-5x	96	96	192	91	283-8x	564-13x
8	Kristian Callaghan	England	97	95	192	88	280-7x	97	89	186	95	281-5x	561-12x
9	Lip Meng Poh	Singapore	97	92	191	87	276-2x	96	92	188	91	279-6x	555-8x
10	Roger Daniel	Trinidad and Tobago	95	89	184	82	266-4x	97	90	187	84	271-3x	537-7x
11	Swee Hon Lim	Singapore	92	93	185	88	273-2x	96	89	185	73	258-3x	531-5x
12	Rhodney Allen	Trinidad and Tobago	94	85	179	83	262-2x	88	87	175	79	254-4x	516-6x
13	Graham Cock	Norfolk Island	81	78	159	65	224-1x	78	80	158	78	236-0x	460-1x

=== Finals ===
Rank	Name	Country	1	2	1-2	3	1-3	4	1-4	5	1-5	6	1-6	7	1-7	8	1-8	Total	Notes
1st place, gold medalist(s)	Anish Bhanwala	India	5	5	10	3	13	1	14	5	19	3	22	3	25	5	30	30	GR
2nd place, silver medalist(s)	Sergei Evglevski	Australia	4	1	5	3	8	4	12	3	15	5	20	4	24	4	28	28	
3rd place, bronze medalist(s)	Sam Gowin	England	3	2	5	4	9	2	11	2	13	2	15	2	17	-	-	17	
4	David Chapman	Australia	3	4	7	2	9	1	10	4	14	1	15	-	-	-	-	15	SO
5	Neeraj Kumar	India	2	3	5	2	7	3	10	3	13	-	-	-	-	-	-	13	SO
6	Muhammad Khalil Akhtar	Pakistan	3	2	5	1	6	2	8	-	-	-	-	-	-	-	-	8	

Key

- Q = Qualified for Finals
- GR = Games record
- SO = Athlete eliminated by Shoot-off for tie
