= 2022 Asian Airgun Championships =

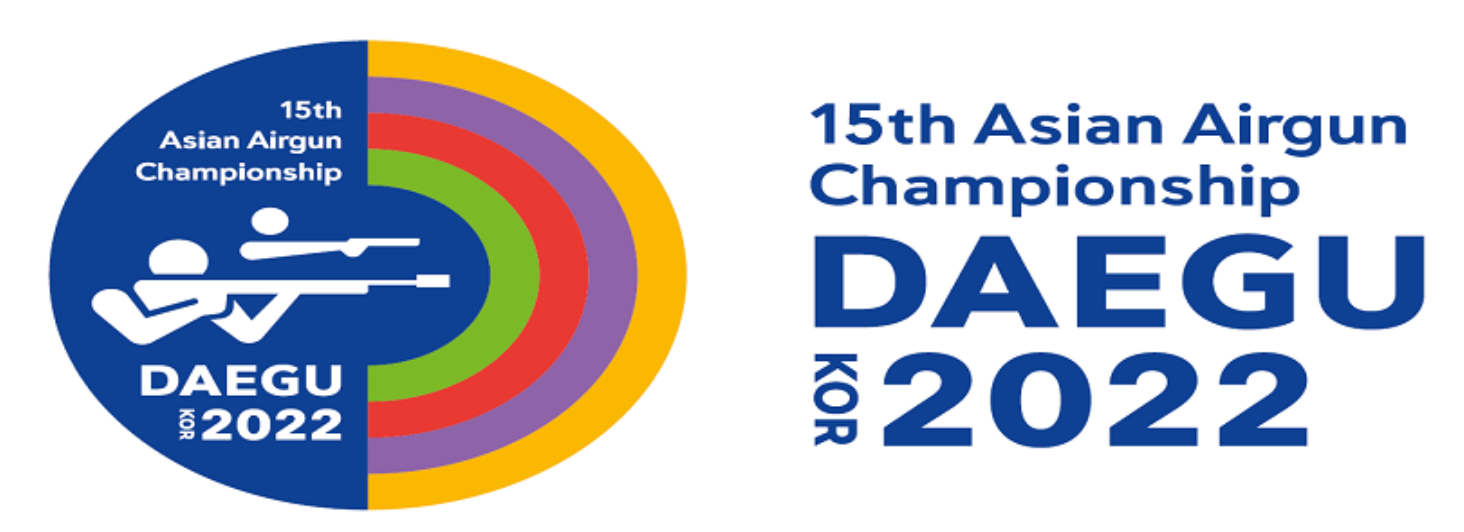
- Host city: Daegu, South Korea
- Dates: 11–18 November 2022
- Main venue: Daegu International Shooting Range

The 2022 Asian Airgun Championships were held at Daegu International Shooting Range, Daegu, South Korea between 11 and 18 November 2022.

== Medal summary ==
=== Men ===
Event	Gold	Silver	Bronze
10 m air pistol	Shiva Narwal; India	Park Dae-hun; South Korea	Vijayveer Sidhu; India
10 m air pistol team	India; Shiva Narwal; Naveen; Vijayveer Sidhu	South Korea; Park Dae-hun; Lee Dae-myung; Mok Jin-mun	Vietnam; Lại Công Minh; Phan Công Minh; Phan Xuân Chuyên
10 m air rifle	Park Ha-jun; South Korea	Kiran Ankush Jadhav; India	Konstantin Malinovskiy; Kazakhstan
10 m air rifle team	India; Arjun Babuta; Kiran Ankush Jadhav; Rudrankksh Patil	Kazakhstan; Ilya Fedin; Konstantin Malinovskiy; Islam Usseinov	South Korea; Kim Sang-do; Oh Jun-yeong; Park Ha-jun

=== Women ===
Event	Gold	Silver	Bronze
10 m air pistol	Rhythm Sangwan; India	Palak Gulia; India	Kim Jang-mi; South Korea
10 m air pistol team	South Korea; Kim Bo-mi; Kim Jang-mi; Yoo Hyun-young	India; Palak Gulia; Rhythm Sangwan; Yuvika Tomar	Singapore; Teh Xiu Hong; Teh Xiu Yi; Teo Shun Xie
10 m air rifle	Mehuli Ghosh; India	Cho Eun-young; South Korea	Alexandra Le; Kazakhstan
10 m air rifle team	India; Mehuli Ghosh; Elavenil Valarivan; Meghana Sajjanar	South Korea; Cho Eun-young; Keum Ji-hyeon; Lee Eun-seo	Kazakhstan; Arina Altukhova; Yelizaveta Bezrukova; Alexandra Le

=== Mixed ===
Event	Gold	Silver	Bronze
10 m air pistol team	India; Vijayveer Sidhu; Rhythm Sangwan	Kazakhstan; Valeriy Rakhimzhan; Irina Yunusmetova	South Korea; Lee Dae-myung; Kim Bo-mi
10 m air pistol team	India; Vijayveer Sidhu; Rhythm Sangwan	Kazakhstan; Valeriy Rakhimzhan; Irina Yunusmetova	South Korea; Mok Jin-mun; Yoo Hyun-young
10 m air rifle team	India; Arjun Babuta; Mehuli Ghosh	India; Kiran Ankush Jadhav; Elavenil Valarivan	Kazakhstan; Islam Usseinov; Yelizaveta Bezrukova
10 m air rifle team	India; Arjun Babuta; Mehuli Ghosh	India; Kiran Ankush Jadhav; Elavenil Valarivan	South Korea; Park Ha-jun; Cho Eun-young

== Medal table ==
Rank	Nation	Gold	Silver	Bronze	Total
1	India	8	4	1	13
2	South Korea	2	4	5	11
3	Kazakhstan	0	2	4	6
4	Singapore	0	0	1	1
4	Vietnam	0	0	1	1
Totals (5 entries)		10	10	12	32
