= Hiroyuki Ikawa =

Japanese sport shooter

Personal information
- Nationality: Japan
- Born: 26 July 1988 (age 37) Yokohama, Japan

Sport
- Sport: Shooting
Medal record
Men's shooting
Representing Japan
Asian Championships
| Bronze medal – third place | 2019 Doha | Mixed skeet team |

Hiroyuki Ikawa (井川 寛之; born 26 July 1988) is a Japanese sport shooter. He competed in the 2020 Summer Olympics.
