= Shooting at the 2023 Pan American Games – Men's 25 metre rapid fire pistol =

Men's 25 metre rapid fire pistol at the 2023 Pan American Games
- Venue: Polígono de tiro de Pudahuel
- Dates: October 21 - October 22
- Competitors: 23 from 15 nations

Medalists
Gold medal	Leuris Pupo	Cuba
Silver medal	Douglas Gómez	Venezuela
Bronze medal	Henry Leverett	United States

The men's 25 metre rapid fire pistol competition of the shooting events at the 2023 Pan American Games was held from October 21 to 22 at Polígono de tiro de Pudahuel in Santiago, Chile.

== Schedule ==
Date	Time	Round
October 21, 2023	09:00	Qualification - Stage 1
October 22, 2023	09:00	Qualification - Stage 1
October 22, 2023	12:30	Final

== Results ==
=== Qualification round ===
The best six scores advance to the final.

Rank	Athlete	Country	8 s	6 s	4 s	8 s	6 s	4 s	Total	Notes
1	Leuris Pupo	Cuba	95	96	95	99	96	97	578-11x	QF
3	Henry Leverett	United States	99	99	90	96	97	94	575-23x	QF
2	Marko Carrillo	Peru	99	97	93	97	94	93	573-14x	QF
4	Keith Sanderson	United States	99	96	91	98	97	92	573-14x	QF
5	Kevin Altamirano	Peru	97	98	96	99	91	92	573-14x	QF
6	Douglas Gómez	Venezuela	98	95	89	94	96	93	565-17x	QF
7	Fidencio González	Mexico	96	95	89	98	95	92	565-12x	
8	Jorge Alvarez	Cuba	96	97	88	96	96	91	564-18x	
9	Vladimir Da Silveira	Brazil	96	95	90	93	97	92	563-15x	
10	Javier Medina	Puerto Rico	94	95	91	97	94	92	563-13x	
11	Alex Peralta	Colombia	96	97	87	98	95	89	562-16x	
12	Jorge Muñoz	El Salvador	93	94	89	95	95	94	560-8x	
13	Emerson Duarte	Brazil	96	93	82	100	98	90	559-11x	
14	Jorge Pimentel	El Salvador	94	91	88	96	97	90	556-18x	
15	Daniel Urquiza	Mexico	96	91	93	95	95	83	553-9x	
16	Yautung Cueva	Ecuador	90	89	93	98	95	88	553-7x	
17	Albino Jiménez	Independent Athletes Team	95	95	89	91	94	88	552-9x	
18	Ignacio Díaz	Chile	96	88	79	96	96	90	554-12x	
19	José Castillo	Independent Athletes Team	89	89	84	96	91	87	539-4x	
20	Dave Seale	Barbados	93	84	93	93	85	81	519-4x	
21	Edwin Barberena	Nicaragua	84	90	73	90	91	84	512-5x	
22	Iván Cruz	Argentina	86	86	77	90	92	72	503-3x	
	Luis Ramón López	Puerto Rico	95	94	90	105.5	103.4	102.9	DSQ	

=== Final ===
The results were as follows:

Rank	Athlete	Country	1st Competition Stage			2nd Competition Stage - Elimination					Total	Notes
1st place, gold medalist(s)	Leuris Pupo	Cuba	3; 3	4; 1	8; 4	13; 5	18; 5	21; 3	26; 5	4	30	
2nd place, silver medalist(s)	Douglas Gómez	Venezuela	4; 4	5; 1	7; 2	1; 4	15; 4	20; 5	23; 3	3	26	S-off: 5
3rd place, bronze medalist(s)	Henry Leverett	United States	2; 2	3; 1	8; 5	10; 2	15; 5	19; 4	4		23	SO; S-off: 2
4	Marko Carrillo	Peru	2; 2	4; 2	7; 3	1; 4	14; 3	2			16	
5	Kevin Altamirano	Peru	4; 4	6; 2	8; 2	11; 3	1				12	
6	Keith Sanderson	United States	2; 2	5; 3	6; 1	3					9	
