= Zhao Zhonghao =

Chinese sport shooter

Personal information
- Nationality: Chinese
- Born: 8 August 1995 (age 31)

Sport
- Country: China
- Sport: Shooting
- Event: Rifle
Medal record
Men's shooting
Representing China
World Championships
Bronze medal – third place	2018 Changwon	50 m team rifle prone
Bronze medal – third place	2022 Cairo	50 m rifle prone
Asian Championships
Gold medal – first place	2019 Doha	50 m rifle 3 positions team
Silver medal – second place	2019 Doha	50 m rifle 3 positions

Zhao Zhonghao (born 8 August 1995) is a Chinese sport shooter.

He participated at the 2018 ISSF World Shooting Championships, winning a medal.

In March 2021 he was selected to represent China at the 2020 Summer Olympics in the Men's 50m three position rifle. He finished eleventh.

At the 2025 National Games of China, he won a gold medal in the 50m rifle 3-position pairs, teamed with Wang Zifei.
