= Zhao Xiankun =

Chinese sport shooter (born 1993)

Personal information
- Nationality: Chinese
- Born: 27 September 1993 (age 32)

Sport
- Country: China
- Sport: Shooting
- Event: Air pistol
Medal record
World Championships
Bronze medal – third place	2018 Changwon	25 m center fire pistol team
Asian Championships
Gold medal – first place	2019 Doha	25 m center fire pistol team
Silver medal – second place	2019 Doha	25 m standard pistol team

Zhao Xiankun (born 27 September 1993) is a Chinese sport shooter.

He participated at the 2018 ISSF World Shooting Championships, winning a medal.
