= Divyansh Singh Panwar =

Indian sport shooter (born 2002)

Personal information
- Nationality: Indian
- Born: 19 October 2002 (age 23) Jaipur, Rajasthan, India

Sport
- Sport: Shooting
- Event: 10 metre air rifle
- Coached by: Deepak Kumar Dubey
Medal record
10 metre air rifle shooting
Representing India
Event	1st	2nd	3rd
Olympic Games	-	-	-
World Cup	4	1	1
World Junior Shooting Championships	-	-	1
ISSF Junior World Cup	1	-	-
Total	5	1	2
World Championships
Bronze medal – third place	2018 Changwon	Junior mixed 10m air rifle team
Asian Championships
Gold medal – first place	2023 Changwon	10 m air rifle team
Silver medal – second place	2023 Changwon	10 m air rifle mixed team
Asian Airgun Championships
Gold medal – first place	2019 Taoyuan	10 m air rifle
Gold medal – first place	2019 Taoyuan	10 m air rifle team
World University Games
Gold medal – first place	2021 Chengdu	10 m air rifle team
Silver medal – second place	2021 Chengdu	10 m air rifle
Silver medal – second place	2021 Chengdu	10 m air rifle mixed team
- Updated on 26 September 2019

Divyansh Singh Panwar (born 19 October 2002) is an Indian sport shooter. He won the silver medal in the 10 metre air rifle event at the 2019 ISSF World Cup in Beijing and secured a quota position for India at the 2020 Summer Olympics where he achieved rank 32 at the Men's 10 metre air rifle event.

== Early life ==
Panwar was born on 19 October 2002 to Ashok Panwar, a staff at the Sawai Man Singh Hospital in Jaipur, and Nirmala Devi, a qualified nurse. Panwar took up shooting in 2014 at the age of 12 and initially used his elder sister Anjali's weapons at the Jagatpura shooting range in Jaipur. In 2017, his father became worried by his "PUBG addiction" and enrolled him at the Dr. Karni Singh Shooting Range in New Delhi where he trained under Deepak Kumar Dubey.

== Career ==
Panwar won two gold medals at the 2018 ISSF Junior World Cup in Suhl. The trio of Panwar, Hriday Hazarika and Shahu Tushar Mane won gold in the junior men's team 10 metre air rifle event with a score of 1875.3, a world junior record. In the junior mixed team event, Panwar and Elavenil Valarivan broke the world junior record, scoring 498.6, to clinch gold.

At the 2018 ISSF World Shooting Championships in Changwon, Panwar and Shreya Agarwal won bronze in the 10 metre air rifle junior mixed team event.

After finishing 12th in the individual 10 metre air rifle event of 2019 ISSF World Cup in Delhi, Panwar won silver at the same event in Beijing. He secured India's fourth quota spot in shooting discipline at the 2020 Summer Olympics with the performance. Paired with Anjum Moudgil in the mixed team event at the World Cup, he won gold in Beijing, gold in Munich and bronze in Rio de Janeiro. At the 2019 World Cup Final in Putian, Panwar bagged gold in the individual 10 metre air rifle, and gold in the mixed team event with Croatia's Snježana Pejčić.

In May 2019, he was promoted from developmental group to core group of the Target Olympic Podium Scheme.

== Personal life ==
As of 2019, Panwar is a class 12 biology student at Maheshwari Public School, Jaipur, and regards himself to be "average" at studies. He practices meditation and carries a Bhagavad Gita pocketbook with him.
