= Wang Xinjie =

Chinese sports shooter (born 1996)

Personal information
- Born: 24 October 1996 (age 29) Shanghai, China

Sport
- Sport: Sports shooting
Medal record
Men's shooting
Representing China
Olympic Games
Bronze medal – third place	2024 Paris	25 m rapid fire pistol
World Championships
Gold medal – first place	2023 Baku	25 m rapid fire pistol team
Gold medal – first place	2023 Baku	25 m standard pistol team
Asian Games
Gold medal – first place	2022 Hangzhou	25 m rapid fire pistol team
Asian Championships
Gold medal – first place	2023 Changwon	25 m rapid fire pistol team
Silver medal – second place	2023 Changwon	25 m standard pistol

Wang Xinjie (born 24 October 1996) is a Chinese sport shooter. He has won medals at the Asian Games and the ISSF World Shooting Championships.

== Career ==
Wang competed in the 25 metre rapid fire pistol team event of the 2022 Asian Games alongside Li Yuehong and Liu Yangpan, where they won the gold medal. Li, Liu and Wang won the gold medal at the 25 m rapid fire pistol team and 25 m standard pistol team events of the 2023 ISSF World Shooting Championships. In the 25 m rapid fire pistol event at the 2024 Summer Olympics, his debut appearance, Wang won the bronze medal.
