= Kajal Saini =

Indian sport shooter (born 1994)

Personal information
- Nationality: Indian
- Born: Kajal Saini; 31 August 1994 (age 31) Rohtak, India
- Height: 167 cm (5 ft 6 in)

Sport
- Country: India
- Sport: Shooting
- Event: [50-m Rifle 3-position]
- Team: Indian Team
Medal record
Women's shooting
Representing India
Asian Championships
Gold medal – first place	2019 Doha	50 m rifle prone team
Bronze medal – third place	2019 Doha	50 m rifle 3 positions team

Kajal Saini (born 31 August 1994) is an Indian sport shooter. She is from Rohtak and represents Haryana. Her coach is Mr. Manoj Kumar who is currently the chief coach of the Indian 50m Rifle Team and her current World Rank is 53.

== Career ==
Saini took up shooting while studying in Baba Mast Nath Senior Secondary School in Rohtak.

She has three positions in 50m Rifle and World Cup- Participations three.

- Place 22 1 Rio de Janeiro- Score: 1167 in 2019
- Place 60 1 Beijing- Score: 1142 in 2019
- Place 70 1 Munich- Score: 1140 in 2019

She won two medals in 13th 2019 Asian Shooting Championships South Asian Games held in Nepal. In November in Doha she won Gold and Bronze in 14th Asian Shooting championship. She was NCC cadet in Government Women college. She is aspirant for Tokyo Olympic.
