= Cho Eun-young (sport shooter, born 1995) =

South Korean sport shooter

Personal information
- Nationality: South Korean
- Born: 14 November 1995 (age 30)

Sport
- Country: South Korea
- Sport: Shooting
Medal record
Women's shooting
Representing South Korea
World Championships
Bronze medal – third place	2022 Cairo	10 m air rifle mixed team
Asian Airgun Championships
Silver medal – second place	2022 Daegu	10 m air rifle
Silver medal – second place	2022 Daegu	10 m air rifle team
Bronze medal – third place	2022 Daegu	10 m air rifle mixed team

Korean name
- Hangul: 조은영
- RR: Jo Eunyeong
- MR: Cho Ŭnyŏng

Cho Eun-young (born 14 November 1995) is a South Korean sport shooter who plays for Cheongju City. She competed in the 2020 Summer Olympics.
