= Fatemeh Karamzadeh =

Iranian sport shooter (born 1998)

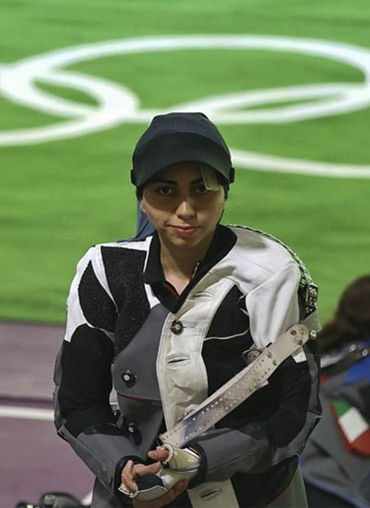
- Fatemeh Karamzadeh at the 2020 Summer Olympics

Personal information
- Nationality: Iranian
- Born: 26 November 1998 (age 27) Khorramshahr, Iran
- Height: 1.69 m (5 ft 7 in)
- Weight: 60 kg (132 lb)

Sport
- Sport: Shooting
- Coached by: Maryam Talebi (National Team)
Medal record
Representing Iran
ISSF World Cup
Gold medal – first place	2021 Osijek	10m air rifle team
Bronze medal – third place	2022 Rio de Janeiro	10m air rifle team
Asian Championships
Silver medal – second place	2019 Doha	Rifle 3 Positions team
Bronze medal – third place	2019 Doha	Air Rifle team

Fatemeh Karamzadeh (Persian: فاطمه کرم‌زاده; born 26 November 1998) is an Iranian sport shooter, born in Khorramshahr but immigrated to Bushehr in childhood. She represented Iran at the 2020 Summer Olympics in Tokyo 2021, competing in women's 10 metre air rifle and in Women's 50 metre rifle three positions.

Her residence is in Bushehr.

== Olympic results ==
Year	Event	Score	Rank	Ref
2021	10 metre air rifle	624.9	23	
2021	50 metre rifle three positions	1163	22	
