= Han Dae-yoon =

South Korean sports shooter

Personal information
- Nationality: South Korean
- Born: 12 August 1988 (age 37)

Sport
- Sport: Sports shooting
Medal record
Men's shooting
Representing South Korea
Asian Championships
Gold medal – first place	2019 Doha	25 m center fire pistol
Silver medal – second place	2019 Doha	25 m center fire pistol team
Silver medal – second place	2019 Doha	25 m rapid fire pistol team
Bronze medal – third place	2019 Doha	25 m standard pistol
Bronze medal – third place	2019 Doha	25 m standard pistol team

Han Dae-yoon (born 12 August 1988) is a South Korean sports shooter. He competed in the men's 25 metre rapid fire pistol event at the 2020 Summer Olympics.
