= Park Dae-hun =

South Korean sport shooter

Personal information
- Nationality: South Korean
- Born: 18 July 1995 (age 30)

Sport
- Country: South Korea
- Sport: Shooting
- Event: Air pistol
Medal record
Men's shooting
Representing South Korea
World Championships
Gold medal – first place	2018 Changwon	50 m team pistol
Silver medal – second place	2022 Cairo	10 m air pistol mixed team
Bronze medal – third place	2022 Cairo	10 metre air pistol team
Asian Championships
Gold medal – first place	2015 Kuwait City	50 m pistol
Gold medal – first place	2015 Kuwait City	50 m pistol team
Gold medal – first place	2019 Doha	50 m pistol
Gold medal – first place	2019 Doha	50 m pistol team
Silver medal – second place	2019 Doha	10 m air pistol team
Asian Airgun Championships
Silver medal – second place	2022 Daegu	10 m air pistol
Silver medal – second place	2022 Daegu	10 m air pistol team

Park Dae-hun (born 18 July 1995) is a South Korean sport shooter.

He participated at the 2018 ISSF World Shooting Championships.
