= Muhammad Khalil Akhtar =

Pakistani sports shooter

Personal information
- Born: 15 April 1984 (age 42) Rajanpur, Pakistan
- Height: 1.65 m (5 ft 5 in)

Sport
- Sport: Shooting
- Event: 25 m rapid fire pistol
- Team: Pakistan National Shooting Team
Medal record
Men's shooting
Representing Pakistan
Islamic Solidarity Games
Bronze medal – third place	2017 Baku	25 m center fire pistol
South Asian Games
Silver medal – second place	2016 Guwahati & Shillong	25 m rapid fire pistol team

Muhammad Khalil Akhtar (born 15 April 1984) is a Pakistani sports shooter. Khalil was the flag-bearer at the 2020 Tokyo Olympics opening ceremony along with Mahoor Shahzad and competed in the men's 25 metre rapid fire pistol event, finishing 15th.

== Career ==
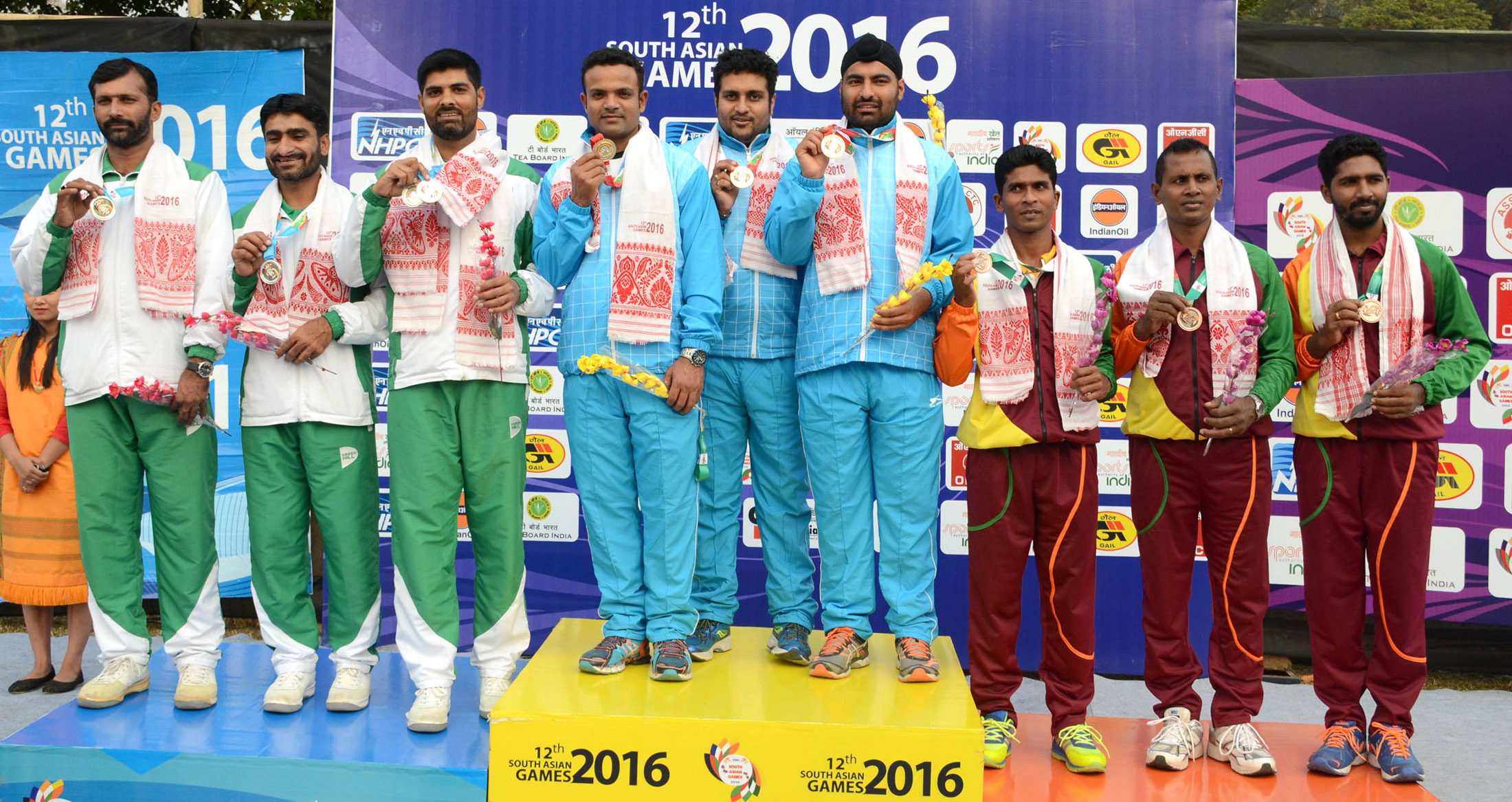
Khalil Akhtar at the 2016 South Asian Games.

Akhtar won silver in the 2016 South Asian Games. He finished sixth in the men's 25 metre rapid fire pistol event at the 2018 Commonwealth Games.

=== 25 metre rapid fire pistol ===
Representing Pakistan
Year	Event	Result
2016	South Asian Games	2
2018	World Championships	18
2018	Asian Games	12
2018	Commonwealth Games	6
2019	Asian Championships	8
2021	Summer Olympics	15

Olympic Games
Preceded by Shah Hussain Shah	Flagbearer for Pakistan; Tokyo 2020	Succeeded by Incumbent
