= Cheon Min-ho =

South Korean sports shooter (born 1987)

Personal information
- Nationality: South Korean
- Born: 6 April 1987 (age 39) Yeongju, South Korea
- Height: 1.73 m (5 ft 8 in)
- Weight: 56 kg (123 lb)

Sport
- Country: South Korea
- Sport: Shooting
- Event: Air rifle
- Club: Gyeonbuk Physical Education High School
Medal record
Men's shooting
Representing South Korea
World Championships
Silver medal – second place	2018 Changwon	300 m team standard rifle
Asian Championships
Silver medal – second place	2019 Doha	50 m rifle 3 positions team
Bronze medal – third place	2019 Doha	50 m rifle prone team
Bronze medal – third place	2024 Jakarta	50 m rifle 3 positions team

Cheon Min-ho (Korean: 천민호; born 6 April 1987) is a Korean sport shooter.

He was born in Gyeongsangbuk, South Korea. He competed in the 2004 Summer Olympic Games in Athens, Greece, in Men's Air Rifle, 10 metres, coming in fourth.

He shares the world junior record in the 10 m air rifle competition, a 599 in April 2004, in Athens, Greece.

== Current world record in 10 m air rifle ==
Current world records held in 10 m Air Rifle
Junior Men	Individual	599	Cheon Min-ho (KOR); Zhu Qinan (CHN); Zhu Qinan (CHN); Sergey Richter (ISR)	April 24, 2004; August 16, 2004; October 30, 2004; May 16, 2009	Athens (GRE); Athens (GRE); Bangkok (THA); Munich (GER)
