= Manini Kaushik =

Indian sport shooter

Personal information
- Nationality: Indian

Sport
- Sport: Shooting
- Event: 50 m rifle three positions
Medal record
Women's shooting
Representing India
Asian Games
Silver medal – second place	2022 Hangzhou	50 m rifle 3 positions team
World University Games
Gold medal – first place	2021 Chengdu	50 m rifle 3 positions team
Asian Championships
Gold medal – first place	2026 New Delhi	50 m Rifle Prone Team
Silver medal – second place	2025 Shymkent	50 m rifle prone team
Bronze medal – third place	2025 Shymkent	50 m rifle prone

Manini Kaushik is an Indian sport shooter.
