= Nimana =

- Village
- Location in Haryana, India Nimana (India)
- Country: India
- State: Haryana
- Region: North India
- District: Jhajjar

Languages
  - Official: Hindi
- Time zone: UTC+5:30 (IST)
- PIN: 124105
- ISO 3166 code: IN-HR
- Vehicle registration: HR-14
- Website: haryana.gov.in

Nimana is a village of Gulia Jats in the Jhajjar district of Haryana state, India, about 6 kilometres (3.7 mi) southwest of Badli village. Jats are a majority of the population. The major source of income is farming. The village has a literacy rate of about 60-70%. Nimana is known for holi celebration which is followed by a feast. People from 11 surrounding villages come for the holi celebrations and meal. Surrounding villages are Sondhi, Yakubpur and Pelpa.
