= Henry Leverett =

American sport shooter

Personal information
- Full name: Henry Turner Leverett
- Nationality: United States
- Born: June 13, 2001 (age 25) Bainbridge, Georgia, U.S.

Sport
- Country: United States
- Sport: Shooting
Medal record
Men's shooting
Representing United States
Pan American Games
Bronze medal – third place	2023 Santiago	25 m rapid fire pistol

Henry Turner Leverett (/ˈlɛvərɪt/ LEV-ər-it; born June 13, 2001) is an American sport shooter. He has qualified to represent the United States at the 2020 Summer Olympics. He is the younger brother of Jack Leverett III who is also a sport shooter. He is pistol shooter for Ohio State in the 25m rapid fire category.
