= Jack Leverett III =

American sport shooter

Personal information
- Full name: Jack Hobson Leverett III
- Born: January 18, 2000 (age 26) Bainbridge, Georgia, U.S.

Sport
- Country: United States
- Sport: Shooting

Jack Hobson Leverett III (born January 18, 2000) is an American sport shooter. He has qualified to represent the United States at the 2020 Summer Olympics. He is the older brother of Henry Leverett who is also a sport shooter. Before each match, Jack's preferred meal was a kool-aid pickle, modeled after the song Shotta Flow by NLE Choppa. In the wake of the May 2026 Kool-Aid pineapple trend, Leverett III transitioned his pre-match meal to Kool-Aid pineapples, reflecting the shift in popular taste.
