= 2019 Asian Shooting Championships =

Shooting championship

- Host city: Doha, Qatar
- Dates: 5–13 November 2019
- Main venue: Lusail Shooting Range

The 2019 Asian Shooting Championships were the 14th Asian Shooting Championships and took place from 5 to 13 November 2019, at Lusail Shooting Complex, Doha, Qatar.

It was the Asian qualifying tournament for the 2020 Summer Olympics in Tokyo.

== Medal summary ==
=== Men ===
Event	Gold	Silver	Bronze
10 m air pistol	Kim Song-guk; North Korea	Saurabh Chaudhary; India	Javad Foroughi; Iran
10 m air pistol team	China; He Zhengyang; Pang Wei; Pu Qifeng	South Korea; Koh Eun-suk; Lee Dae-myung; Park Dae-hun	India; Saurabh Chaudhary; Sharvan Kumar; Abhishek Verma
25 m center fire pistol	Han Dae-yoon; South Korea	Gurpreet Singh; India	Kim Jun-hong; South Korea
25 m center fire pistol team	China; Jin Yongde; Yao Zhaonan; Zhao Xiankun	South Korea; Han Dae-yoon; Kim Jun-hong; Song Jong-ho	India; Adarsh Singh; Gurpreet Singh; Yogesh Singh
25 m rapid fire pistol	Lin Junmin; China	Li Yuehong; China	Yao Zhaonan; China
25 m rapid fire pistol team	China; Li Yuehong; Lin Junmin; Yao Zhaonan	South Korea; Han Dae-yoon; Kim Jun-hong; Song Jong-ho	India; Anish Bhanwala; Bhavesh Shekhawat; Adarsh Singh
25 m standard pistol	Yao Zhaonan; China	Udhayveer Sidhu; India	Han Dae-yoon; South Korea
25 m standard pistol team	India; Udhayveer Sidhu; Vijayveer Sidhu; Gurpreet Singh	China; Lin Junmin; Yao Zhaonan; Zhao Xiankun	South Korea; Han Dae-yoon; Kim Jun-hong; Koh Eun-suk
50 m pistol	Park Dae-hun; South Korea	Gaurav Rana; India	Arjun Singh Cheema; India
50 m pistol team	South Korea; Lee Dae-myung; Mok Jin-mun; Park Dae-hun	China; Pu Qifeng; Xu Zhanyi; Zhang Tian	India; Arjun Singh Cheema; Gaurav Rana; Monu Tomar
10 m air rifle	Liu Yukun; China	Yu Haonan; China	Deepak Kumar; India
10 m air rifle team	China; Liu Yukun; Song Buhan; Yu Haonan	South Korea; Choo Byoung-gil; Nam Tae-yun; Park Ha-jun	Iran; Hossein Bagheri; Amir Mohammad Nekounam; Mahyar Sedaghat
50 m rifle prone	Konstantin Malinovskiy; Kazakhstan	Liu Gang; China	Li Xinmiao; China
50 m rifle prone team	China; Li Jiahong; Li Xinmiao; Liu Gang	India; Subhankar Pramanick; Sanjeev Rajput; Tarun Yadav	South Korea; Cheon Min-ho; Kim Jong-hyun; Kim Sang-do
50 m rifle 3 positions	Kim Jong-hyun; South Korea	Zhao Zhonghao; China	Aishwary Pratap Singh Tomar; India
50 m rifle 3 positions team	China; Yao Yuncong; Zhang Changhong; Zhao Zhonghao	South Korea; Cheon Min-ho; Kim Jong-hyun; Kim Sang-do	India; Parul Kumar; Chain Singh; Aishwary Pratap Singh Tomar
10 m running target	Jo Yong-chol; North Korea	Gan Yu; China	Pak Myong-won; North Korea
10 m running target team	North Korea; Jo Yong-chol; Kwon Kwang-il; Pak Myong-won	China; Gan Yu; Shen Minzhe; Xu Hong	Kazakhstan; Bakhtiyar Ibrayev; Andrey Khudyakov; Farukh Nazirkulov
10 m running target mixed	Pak Myong-won; North Korea	Kwon Kwang-il; North Korea	Bakhtiyar Ibrayev; Kazakhstan
10 m running target mixed team	North Korea; Jo Yong-chol; Kwon Kwang-il; Pak Myong-won	China; Gan Yu; Shen Minzhe; Xu Hong	Kazakhstan; Bakhtiyar Ibrayev; Andrey Khudyakov; Farukh Nazirkulov
Trap	Talal Al-Rashidi; Kuwait	Khaled Al-Mudhaf; Kuwait	Naser Al-Meqlad; Kuwait
Trap team	Kuwait; Naser Al-Meqlad; Khaled Al-Mudhaf; Talal Al-Rashidi	India; Kynan Chenai; Manavjit Singh Sandhu; Prithviraj Tondaiman	Qatar; Saeed Abusharib; Rashid Hamad Al-Athba; Mohammed Al-Rumaihi
Double trap	Wen Baolu; China	Wang Hao; China	Hussein Al-Shuhoumi; Oman
Double trap team	China; Hu Binyuan; Wang Hao; Wen Baolu	Kuwait; Ahmad Al-Afasi; Saad Al-Mutairi; Jarrah Al-Showaier	Oman; Ahmed Al-Hatmi; Saleem Al-Nasri; Hussein Al-Shuhoumi
Skeet	Angad Vir Singh Bajwa; India	Mairaj Ahmad Khan; India	Saud Habib; Kuwait
Skeet team	Qatar; Masoud Saleh Al-Athba; Rashid Saleh Al-Athba; Nasser Al-Attiyah	Kuwait; Mohammad Al-Daihani; Abdullah Al-Rashidi; Saud Habib	Kazakhstan; Alexandr Mukhamediyev; Vladislav Mukhamediyev; David Pochivalov

=== Women ===
Event	Gold	Silver	Bronze
10 m air pistol	Manu Bhaker; India	Wang Qian; China	Jiang Ranxin; China
10 m air pistol team	South Korea; Choo Ga-eun; Kim Min-jung; Yoo Hyun-young	China; Jiang Ranxin; Qian Wei; Wang Qian	India; Manu Bhaker; Yashaswini Singh Deswal; Annu Raj Singh
25 m pistol	Naphaswan Yangpaiboon; Thailand	Otryadyn Gündegmaa; Mongolia	Zhang Jingjing; China
25 m pistol team	South Korea; Kim Jang-mi; Kim Min-jung; Lee Pu-reum	China; Chen Yan; Xiong Yaxuan; Zhang Jingjing	Thailand; Kanyakorn Hirunphoem; Tanyaporn Prucksakorn; Naphaswan Yangpaiboon
10 m air rifle	Yang Qian; China	Tessa Neo; Singapore	Jung Eun-hea; South Korea
10 m air rifle team	South Korea; Jung Eun-hea; Keum Ji-hyeon; Kwon Eun-ji	India; Apurvi Chandela; Anjum Moudgil; Elavenil Valarivan	Iran; Fatemeh Karamzadeh; Najmeh Khedmati; Hosna Toutounchi
50 m rifle prone	Wan Xiangyan; China	Lee Eun-seo; South Korea	Nur Suryani Taibi; Malaysia
50 m rifle prone team	India; Anjum Moudgil; Kajal Saini; Tejaswini Sawant	China; Chen Fang; Pei Ruijiao; Wan Xiangyan	South Korea; Bae Sang-hee; Kim Je-hee; Lee Eun-seo
50 m rifle 3 positions	Shi Mengyao; China	Oyuunbatyn Yesügen; Mongolia	Shiori Hirata; Japan
50 m rifle 3 positions team	China; Shi Mengyao; Sun Ting; Zhao Ruozhu	Iran; Elaheh Ahmadi; Mahlagha Jambozorg; Fatemeh Karamzadeh	India; Gaayathri Nithyanadam; Kajal Saini; Tejaswini Sawant
10 m running target	Fatima Irnazarova; Kazakhstan	Yang Zeng; China	Ri Ji-ye; North Korea
10 m running target team	China; Qiu Zhiqi; Yang Zeng; Zhang Rouxin	North Korea; Han Chol-sim; Paek Ok-sim; Ri Ji-ye	Qatar; Samsam Saleh Juma; Amal Mohammed; Saaida Humaid Taaeeb
10 m running target mixed	Yang Zeng; China	Alexandra Saduakassova; Kazakhstan	Ri Ji-ye; North Korea
10 m running target mixed team	North Korea; Paek Ok-sim; Pang Myong-hyang; Ri Ji-ye	China; Fan Min; Qiu Zhiqi; Yang Zeng	Kazakhstan; Fatima Irnazarova; Zukhra Irnazarova; Alexandra Saduakassova
Trap	Ray Bassil; Lebanon	Sarsenkul Rysbekova; Kazakhstan	Yukie Nakayama; Japan
Trap team	Kazakhstan; Anastassiya Davydova; Mariya Dmitriyenko; Sarsenkul Rysbekova	China; Deng Weiyun; Liu Yingzi; Wang Xiaojing	Chinese Taipei; Huang Yen-hua; Lin Yi-chun; Liu Wan-yu
Skeet	Wei Meng; China	Zhang Donglian; China	Kim Min-ji; South Korea
Skeet team	China; Wei Meng; Zhang Donglian; Zhang Heng	Thailand; Isarapa Imprasertsuk; Sutiya Jiewchaloemmit; Nutchaya Sutarporn	India; Darshna Rathore; Ganemat Sekhon; Saniya Shaikh

=== Mixed ===
Event	Gold	Silver	Bronze
10 m air pistol team	India; Abhishek Verma; Manu Bhaker	India; Saurabh Chaudhary; Yashaswini Singh Deswal	Iran; Javad Foroughi; Golnoush Sebghatollahi
10 m air rifle team	South Korea; Choo Byoung-gil; Keum Ji-hyeon	China; Yu Haonan; Yang Qian	China; Song Buhan; Zhao Ruozhu
Trap team	Kuwait; Abdulrahman Al-Faihan; Sarah Al-Hawal	China; He Weidong; Deng Weiyun	Chinese Taipei; Yang Kun-pi; Liu Wan-yu
Skeet team	China; Jin Di; Wei Meng	India; Angad Vir Singh Bajwa; Ganemat Sekhon	Japan; Hiroyuki Ikawa; Naoko Ishihara

== Medal table ==
Rank	Nation	Gold	Silver	Bronze	Total
1	China	20	20	5	45
2	South Korea	8	6	7	21
3	North Korea	6	2	3	11
4	India	5	10	11	26
5	Kuwait	3	3	2	8
6	Kazakhstan	3	2	5	10
7	Thailand	1	1	1	3
8	Qatar	1	0	2	3
9	Lebanon	1	0	0	1
10	Mongolia	0	2	0	2
11	Iran	0	1	4	5
12	Singapore	0	1	0	1
13	Japan	0	0	3	3
14	Chinese Taipei	0	0	2	2
14	Oman	0	0	2	2
16	Malaysia	0	0	1	1
Totals (16 entries)		48	48	48	144
