= Shooting at the 2021 Summer World University Games =

Shooting competition

- Venue: Chengdu, China
- Location: Chengdu Sports School
- Dates: 29 July–2 August 2023
- Competitors: 218 from 28 nations

Shooting was contested at the 2021 Summer World University Games as an optional sport from 29 July to 2 August 2023 at the Chengdu Shooting Sport School in Chengdu, Sichuan, China.

== Participating nations ==
218 shooters from 28 nations participated in the 2021 Summer World University Games:

- Armenia (2)
- Azerbaijan (7)
- China (20)
- Chinese Taipei (10)
- Czech Republic (9)
- Denmark (2)
- Finland (5)
- France (8)
- Germany (2)
- Hungary (12)
- India (20)
- Iran (14)
- Italy (4)
- Japan (7)
- Kazakhstan (11)
- Kyrgyzstan (2)
- Malaysia (3)
- Mongolia (10)
- Peru (1)
- Poland (9)
- Singapore (10)
- Slovakia (5)
- Slovenia (2)
- South Korea (20)
- Spain (6)
- Switzerland (3)
- Turkey (7)
- United States (7)

== Medal table ==
* Host nation (China)

Rank	Nation	Gold	Silver	Bronze	Total
1	India	8	4	2	14
2	China*	6	4	5	15
3	South Korea	3	2	2	7
4	Czech Republic	1	1	3	5
5	Hungary	0	3	0	3
6	Kazakhstan	0	2	1	3
6	United States	0	2	1	3
8	Iran	0	0	2	2
9	Chinese Taipei	0	0	1	1
9	Poland	0	0	1	1
Totals (10 entries)		18	18	18	54

== Medal summary ==
Source (Results Book):

=== Men's events ===
==== Individual ====
Event	Gold	Silver	Bronze
10 metre air pistol	Hu Kai; China	Lim Ho-jin; South Korea	Pavel Schejbal; Czech Republic
10 metre air rifle	Aishwary Pratap Singh; India	Divyansh Singh Panwar; India	Song Buhan; China
25 metre rapid fire pistol	Matěj Rampula; Czech Republic	Nikita Chiryukin; Kazakhstan	Oskar Miliwek; Poland
50 metre rifle three positions	Aishwary Pratap Singh; India	Gavin Barnick; United States	Jiří Přívratský; Czech Republic

==== Team ====
Event	Gold	Silver	Bronze
10 metre air pistol	South Korea; Lim Ho-jin; Choe Bo-ram; Lee Won-ho	China; Hu Kai; Xu Zhanyi; Zhang Bingchen	India; Varun Tomar; Arjun Singh Cheema; Anmol Jain
10 metre air rifle	India; Arjun Babuta; Divyansh Singh Panwar; Aishwary Pratap Singh	China; Li Xinmiao; Song Buhan; Zhu Xiaozhong	Kazakhstan; Konstantin Malinovskiy; Islam Satpayev; Nikita Shakhtorin
25 metre rapid fire pistol	China; Duan Zhicheng; Xia Qi; Liu Shuai	India; Udhayveer Sidhu; Vijayveer Sidhu; Adarsh Singh	South Korea; Lee Gun-hyeok; Lee Seung-hoon; Youn Jae-yeon
50 metre rifle three positions	China; Lin Xinmiao; Liu Yukun; Wang Yuefeng	Kazakhstan; Konstantin Malinovskiy; Islam Satpayev; Nikita Shakhtorin	India; Surya Pratap Singh; Sartaj Singh Tiwana; Aishwary Pratap Singh

=== Women's events ===
==== Individual ====
Event	Gold	Silver	Bronze
10 metre air pistol	Manu Bhaker; India	Sára Fábián; Hungary	Chen Yu-ju; Chinese Taipei
10 metre air rifle	Elavenil Valarivan; India	Mary Tucker; United States	Xing Hang; China
25 metre pistol	Yang Ji-in; South Korea	Sára Fábián; Hungary	Xiong Yaxuan; China
50 metre rifle three positions	Sift Kaur Samra; India	Ashi Chouksey; India	Wang Zeru; China

==== Team ====
Event	Gold	Silver	Bronze
10 metre air pistol	India; Abhidnya Ashok Patil; Yashaswini Singh Deswal; Manu Bhaker	China; Lin Yaxi; Zhang Qi; Wang Keyi	Iran; Fatemeh Shekari; Laya Mohammadi; Haniyeh Rostamiyan
10 metre air rifle	South Korea; Choi Eun-jeong; Yoo Seon-hwa; Kim Ji-eun	Hungary; Eszter Dénes; Gitta Bajos; Dorina Lovász	China; Xing Hang; Zhang Yu; Gu Xinyu
25 metre pistol	China; Xiong Yaxuan; Wang Keyi; Lin Yaxi	South Korea; Sim Eun-ji; Yang Ji-in; Kim Min-seo	Iran; Laya Mohammadi; Haniyeh Rostamiyan; Amitis Jafari
50 metre rifle three positions	India; Ashi Chouksey; Manini Kaushik; Sift Kaur Samra	China; Shi Mengyao; Wang Zeru; Xing Hang	Czech Republic; Veronika Blažíčková; Sára Karasová; Kateřina Štefánková

=== Mixed events ===
==== Team ====
Event	Gold	Silver	Bronze
10 metre air pistol	China; Zhang Qi; Hu Kai	Czech Republic; Veronika Schejbalová; Pavel Schejbal	South Korea; Jang Ji-in; Lee Won-ho
10 metre air rifle	China; Zhang Yu; Song Buhan	India; Elavenil Valarivan; Divyansh Singh Panwar	United States; Mary Tucker; Gavin Barnick
