= Ghulam Mustafa Bashir =

Pakistani sports shooter (born 1987)

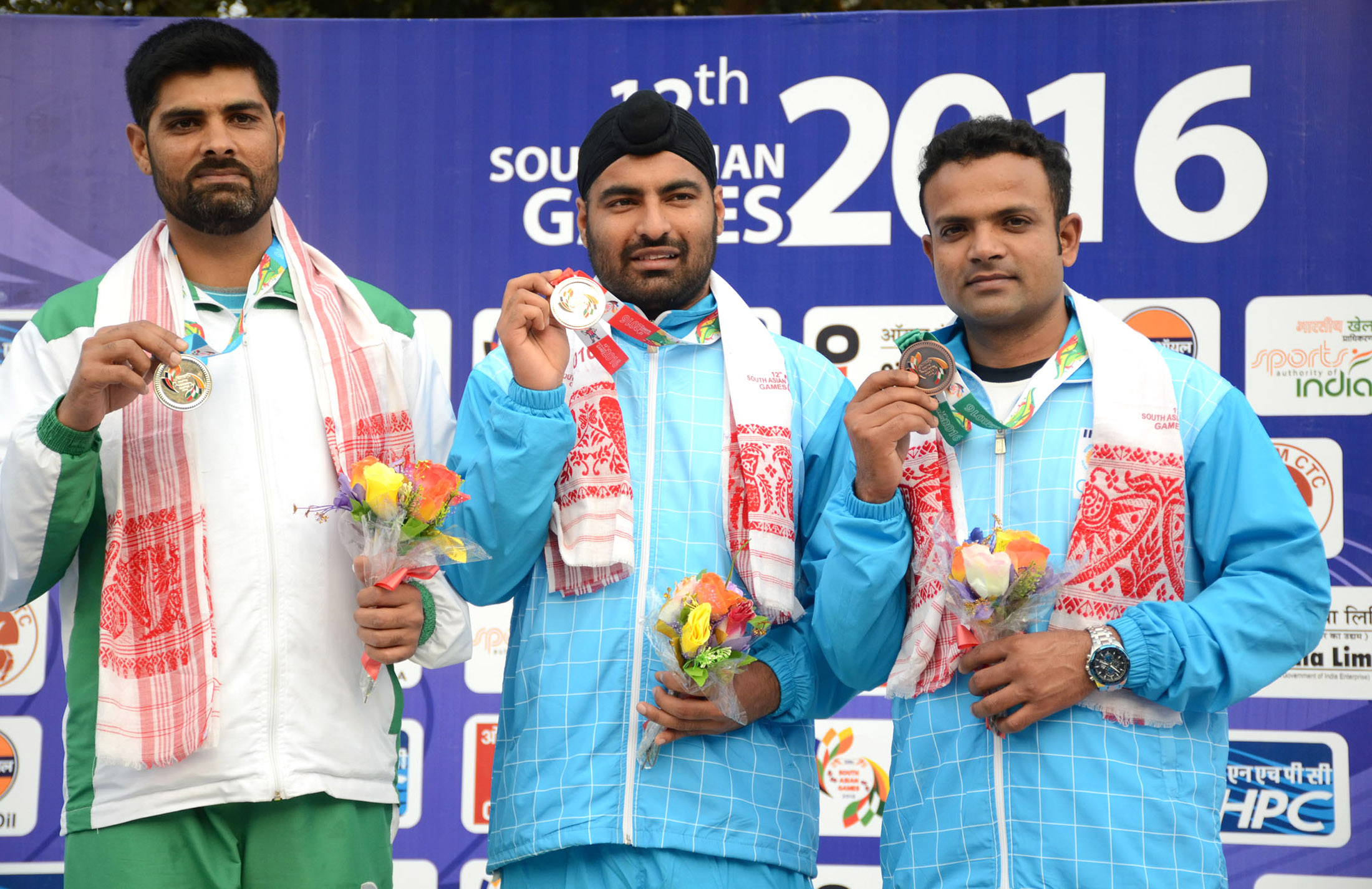
- Bashir (left) at the 2016 South Asian Games

Personal information
- Nationality: Pakistani
- Born: 4 July 1987 (age 39)
- Height: 180 cm (5 ft 11 in)
- Weight: 74 kg (163 lb)

Sport
- Sport: Sports shooting
Medal record
Representing Pakistan
World Championships
Bronze medal – third place	2022 Cairo	25 m rapid fire pistol
Asian Games
Bronze medal – third place	2026 Aichi–Nagoya	25 m rapid fire pistol

Ghulam Mustafa Bashir (born 4 July 1987) is a Pakistani sports shooter and three-time Olympian. He represented Pakistan in the Men's 25 metre rapid fire pistol event at the 2016 Rio Olympics, 2020 Tokyo Olympics and the 2024 Paris Olympics. He was the flag-bearer for Pakistan during the Parade of Nations at Rio Olympics. He has also represented Pakistan at the 2014, 2018, 2022 and the 2026 Asian Games, winning bronze in the 25 m rapid fire pistol at the 2026 edition in Aichi-Nagoya, his first Asian Games medal and the first by a Pakistani man in shooting at the Games. He became the first Pakistani shooter to win a medal at the ISSF World Championships, claiming bronze in Cairo in 2022. That achievement also earned him a direct quota place for the Paris Olympics and a career-best world ranking of No. 7. He has won over 60 international and national gold medals. He has also secured one gold medal, six silver and one bronze at the South Asian Games in 2016 and 2019.

== Competition record ==
Year	Competition	Venue	Event	Score	Rank
2014	Asian Games	Incheon, South Korea	25m Centre Fire Pistol	580	10th
2014	Asian Games	Incheon, South Korea	25m Rapid Fire Pistol	560	19th
2015	ISSF World Cup	Gabala, Azerbaijan	25m Rapid Fire Pistol	578	16th
2015	ISSF World Cup	Changwon, South Korea	25m Rapid Fire Pistol	567	34th
2016	Olympic Games	Rio de Janeiro, Brazil	25m Rapid Fire Pistol	571	18th
2016	Continental Qualification Competition	New Delhi, India	25m Rapid Fire Pistol	562	11th
2018	World Championships	Changwon, South Korea	25m Rapid Fire Pistol	583	7th
2018	Asian Games	Jakarta, Indonesia	25m Rapid Fire Pistol	577	8th
2019	Asian Championships	Doha, Qatar	25m Rapid Fire Pistol	581 (Final: 15)	5th
2019	ISSF World Cup	Rio de Janeiro, Brazil	25m Rapid Fire Pistol	576	20th
2019	ISSF World Cup	Munich, Germany	25m Rapid Fire Pistol	576	23rd
2019	ISSF World Cup	Beijing, China	25m Rapid Fire Pistol	566	47th
2021	Olympic Games	Tokyo, Japan	25m Rapid Fire Pistol	579	10th
2021	ISSF World Cup	Osijek, Croatia	25m Rapid Fire Pistol	578	11th
2022	World Championships	Cairo, Egypt	25m Rapid Fire Pistol	584 (Medal Match: 19)	3rd
2022	ISSF World Cup	Changwon, South Korea	25m Rapid Fire Pistol	581	13th
2022	Presidents Cup	Cairo, Egypt	25m Rapid Fire Pistol	575	9th
2023	World Championships	Baku, Azerbaijan	25m Rapid Fire Pistol	579	21st
2023	Asian Championships	Changwon, South Korea	25m Rapid Fire Pistol	581	11th
2023	Asian Games	Hangzhou, China	25m Rapid Fire Pistol	580 (Final: 13)	6th
2024	Olympic Games	Paris, France	25m Rapid Fire Pistol	581	15th
2024	ISSF World Cup	Munich, Germany	25m Rapid Fire Pistol	583	14th
2024	Asian Championships	Jakarta, Indonesia	25m Rapid Fire Pistol	572	15th
2024	ISSF World Cup	Baku, Azerbaijan	25m Rapid Fire Pistol	581	12th
2025	World Championships	Cairo, Egypt	25m Rapid Fire Pistol	577	17th
2025	Asian Championships	Shymkent, Kazakhstan	25m Rapid Fire Pistol	574	15th
2026	Asian Games	Nagoya, Japan	25m Rapid Fire Pistol	578 (Final: 22)	3rd
2026	ISSF World Cup	Munich, Germany	25m Rapid Fire Pistol	577	27th
2026	ISSF World Cup	Hangzhou, China	25m Rapid Fire Pistol	574	31st
