= Shri Nivetha Paramanantham =

Indian sport shooter

Shri Nivetha Paramanantham is an Indian sport shooter. She won the Gold in the women's 10m air pistol team event in the ISSF Shooting World Cup in Cairo.
