= He Zhengyang =

Chinese sport shooter

Personal information
- Nationality: Chinese
- Born: 31 January 1997 (age 29)

Sport
- Sport: Sports shooting
Medal record
Men's shooting
Representing China
Asian Championships
Gold medal – first place	2019 Doha	10 m air pistol team

He Zhengyang (born 31 January 1997) is a Chinese sports shooter.
