= Vijayveer Sidhu =

Indian sport shooter (born 2002)

Personal information
- Nationality: Indian
- Born: 21 June 2002 (age 24) Mansa, Punjab, India

Sport
- Sport: Shooting
- Events: 10 m air pistol, 25 m rapid fire pistol
Medal record
Men's shooting
Representing India
World Cup
Gold medal – first place	2025 Buenos Aires	25 m rapid fire pistol
Asian Games
Bronze medal – third place	2022 Hangzhou	25m rapid fire pistol team
Asian Championships
Gold medal – first place	2019 Doha	25 m standard pistol team
Gold medal – first place	2022 Daegu	10 m air pistol team
Silver medal – second place	2024 Jakarta	25 m rapid fire pistol
Bronze medal – third place	2022 Daegu	10 m air pistol
Bronze medal – third place	2023 Changwon	25 m rapid fire pistol team
World University Games
Silver medal – second place	2021 Chengdu	25 m rapid fire pistol team

Vijayveer Sidhu (born 21 June 2002) is an Indian sport shooter from Punjab. He won the bronze medal in Men's 25m rapid fire pistol team in the 2022 Asian Games. He bagged an Olympic quota berth for the Paris Olympics in the 25m rapid fire by winning a silver medal at the Asian Olympic Qualifiers on 13 January 2024 at Jakarta. However, he could not make to the final team after selections. His twin brother Udhayveer Sidhu also is a successful sports shooter. In 2025, he won a gold medal at the ISSF World Cup by winning the men's 25m rapid-fire pistol event.
