= Lin Junmin =

Chinese sport shooter (born 1996)

Personal information
- Nationality: Chinese
- Born: 31 August 1996 (age 29) Zhejiang, China
- Height: 1.78 m (5 ft 10 in)
- Weight: 61 kg (134 lb)

Sport
- Country: China
- Sport: Shooting
- Event: Air pistol
Medal record
World Championships
Gold medal – first place	2018 Changwon	25 m rapid fire pistol
Gold medal – first place	2018 Changwon	25 m rapid fire pistol team
Asian Championships
Gold medal – first place	2019 Doha	25 m rapid fire pistol
Gold medal – first place	2019 Doha	25 m rapid fire pistol team
Silver medal – second place	2019 Doha	25 m standard pistol team

Lin Junmin (Chinese: 林俊敏; pinyin: Lín Jùnmǐn; born 31 August 1996) is a Chinese sport shooter.

He participated at the 2018 ISSF World Shooting Championships, winning the gold medal.

He has qualified to represent China at the 2020 Summer Olympics.
