= Zhang Jian (sport shooter) =

Chinese sport shooter (born 1985)

Personal information
- Nationality: Chinese
- Born: 30 July 1985 (age 40) Anda, Heilongjiang, China
- Height: 1.82 m (6 ft 0 in)
- Weight: 80 kg (176 lb)

Sport
- Country: China
- Sport: Shooting
- Event: Air pistol
Medal record
World Championships
Gold medal – first place	2018 Changwon	25 m rapid fire pistol team
Silver medal – second place	2018 Changwon	25 m rapid fire pistol
Asian Championships
Gold medal – first place	2015 Kuwait City	25 m rapid fire pistol team
Silver medal – second place	2015 Kuwait City	25 m standard pistol team

Zhang Jian (Chinese: 张健; pinyin: Zhāng Jiàn; born 30 July 1985) is a Chinese sport shooter. He was born in Anda, Heilongjiang. He competed in 25 metre rapid fire pistol at the 2012 Summer Olympics in London, where he placed fifth.
