= Yao Zhaonan =

Chinese sport shooter (born 1995)

Personal information
- Nationality: Chinese
- Born: 27 August 1995 (age 30)
- Height: 1.83 m (6 ft 0 in)
- Weight: 84 kg (185 lb)

Sport
- Country: China
- Sport: Shooting
- Event: Air pistol
Medal record
World Championships
Gold medal – first place	2018 Changwon	25 m team rapid fire pistol
Bronze medal – third place	2018 Changwon	25 m team center fire pistol
Asian Championships
Gold medal – first place	2019 Doha	25 m center fire pistol team
Gold medal – first place	2019 Doha	25 m rapid fire pistol team
Gold medal – first place	2019 Doha	25 m standard pistol
Silver medal – second place	2019 Doha	25 m standard pistol team
Bronze medal – third place	2019 Doha	25 m rapid fire pistol

Yao Zhaonan (Chinese: 姚兆楠; pinyin: Yáo Zhàonán; born 27 August 1995) is a Chinese sport shooter.

He participated at the 2018 ISSF World Shooting Championships, winning a medal.
