= Li Yuehong =

Chinese sports shooter (born 1989)

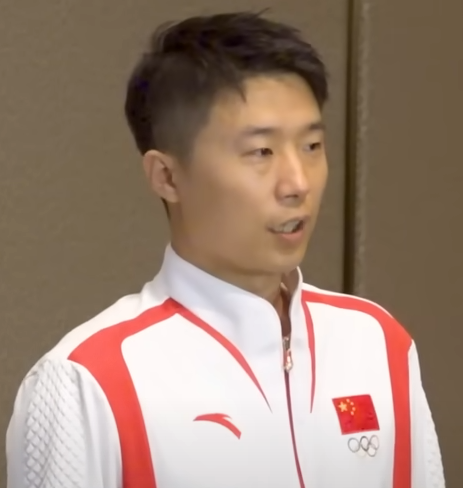
- Li in 2024

Personal information
- Born: 28 August 1989 (age 36) Jinan, Shandong, China

Sport
- Sport: Sports shooting
Medal record
Men's shooting
Representing China
Olympic Games
Gold medal – first place	2024 Paris	25 m rapid fire pistol
Bronze medal – third place	2020 Tokyo	25 m rapid fire pistol
Bronze medal – third place	2016 Rio de Janeiro	25 m rapid fire pistol
World Championships
Gold medal – first place	2022 Cairo	25 m rapid fire pistol team
Gold medal – first place	2023 Baku	25 m rapid fire pistol
Gold medal – first place	2023 Baku	25 m rapid fire pistol team
Gold medal – first place	2023 Baku	25 m standard pistol team
Bronze medal – third place	2010 Munich	25 m rapid fire pistol
Bronze medal – third place	2014 Granada	25 m rapid fire pistol
Asian Games
Gold medal – first place	2010 Guangzhou	25 m rapid fire pistol
Gold medal – first place	2010 Guangzhou	25 m rapid fire pistol team
Gold medal – first place	2022 Hangzhou	25 m rapid fire pistol
Gold medal – first place	2022 Hangzhou	25 m rapid fire pistol team
Silver medal – second place	2014 Incheon	25 m rapid fire pistol team
Asian Championships
Gold medal – first place	2012 Doha	25 m rapid fire pistol team
Gold medal – first place	2015 Kuwait City	25 m rapid fire pistol
Gold medal – first place	2015 Kuwait City	25 m rapid fire pistol team
Gold medal – first place	2019 Doha	25 m rapid fire pistol team
Gold medal – first place	2023 Changwon	25 m rapid fire pistol team
Silver medal – second place	2012 Doha	25 m rapid fire pistol
Silver medal – second place	2015 Kuwait City	25 m standard pistol team
Silver medal – second place	2019 Doha	25 m rapid fire pistol

Li Yuehong (Chinese: 李越宏; pinyin: Lǐ Yuèhóng; born 28 August 1989) is a Chinese sport shooter and three-time Olympic medalist.

Li won bronze in the 25 metre rapid fire pistol event at the 2016 Summer Olympics. He won bronze in the same event at the 2020 Summer Olympics. In the same event at the 2024 Summer Olympics, his third appearance, he won the gold medal.

With a score of 39, Li is the world record holder in the final of the 25 metre rapid fire pistol event, set in Baku in August 2023.
