= Dai Yoshioka =

Japanese sports shooter

Personal information
- Nationality: Japanese
- Born: 14 December 1985 (age 40)

Sport
- Sport: Sports shooting
Medal record
Men's shooting
Representing Japan
Asian Championships
Silver medal – second place	2023 Changwon	25 m rapid fire pistol

Dai Yoshioka (吉岡 大, born 14 December 1985) is a Japanese sports shooter. He competed in the men's 25 metre rapid fire pistol event at the 2020 Summer Olympics.
