= Song Jong-ho (sport shooter) =

South Korean sport shooter

Personal information
- Nationality: South Korean
- Born: 1 March 1990 (age 36) Seoul, South Korea
- Height: 1.70 m (5 ft 7 in)
- Weight: 56 kg (123 lb)

Sport
- Country: South Korea
- Sport: Shooting
- Event: Air pistol
Medal record
Men's shooting
Representing South Korea
World Championships
Silver medal – second place	2023 Baku	25 m center fire pistol team
Bronze medal – third place	2018 Changwon	25 m rapid fire pistol team
Bronze medal – third place	2023 Baku	25 m rapid fire pistol team
Bronze medal – third place	2023 Baku	25 m standard pistol team
Asian Games
Gold medal – first place	2014 Incheon	25 m rapid fire pistol team
Gold medal – first place	2026 Aichi-Nagoya	25 m rapid fire pistol team
Silver medal – second place	2022 Hangzhou	25 m rapid fire pistol team
Asian Championships
Gold medal – first place	2024 Jakarta	25 m rapid fire pistol Team
Silver medal – second place	2019 Doha	25 m center fire pistol team
Silver medal – second place	2019 Doha	25 m rapid fire pistol team
Silver medal – second place	2023 Changwon	25 m rapid fire pistol team
Bronze medal – third place	2024 Jakarta	25 m rapid fire pistol

Song Jong-ho (born 1 March 1990) is a South Korean sport shooter. He participated at the 2018 ISSF World Shooting Championships, winning a medal.
