= Kim Seo-jun (sport shooter) =

South Korean sport shooter

Personal information
- Nationality: South Korean
- Born: 28 October 1990 (age 35) Suncheon, Jeollanam-do, South Korea
- Height: 1.77 m (5 ft 10 in)
- Weight: 64 kg (141 lb)

Sport
- Country: South Korea
- Sport: Shooting
- Event: Air pistol
- Club: Korea National Sport University
Medal record
World Championships
Silver medal – second place	2018 Changwon	25 m standard pistol team
Bronze medal – third place	2018 Changwon	25 m standard pistol
Bronze medal – third place	2018 Changwon	25 m rapid fire pistol team
Bronze medal – third place	2023 Baku	25 m rapid fire pistol team
Asian Championships
Gold medal – first place	2015 Kuwait City	25 m center fire pistol team
Gold medal – first place	2015 Kuwait City	25 m standard pistol team
Silver medal – second place	2015 Kuwait City	25 m rapid fire pistol team
Silver medal – second place	2019 Doha	25 m center fire pistol team
Silver medal – second place	2019 Doha	25 m rapid fire pistol team
Bronze medal – third place	2015 Kuwait City	25 m rapid fire pistol
Bronze medal – third place	2019 Doha	25 m center fire pistol
Bronze medal – third place	2019 Doha	25 m standard pistol team

Kim Seo-jun (Korean: 김서준; born Kim Jun-hong (Korean: 김준홍; Hanja: 金俊宏), born 28 October 1990) is a South Korean shooter. He represented his country at the 2016 Summer Olympics.
