= Shooting at the Summer World University Games =

- Events: 13 (men: 5; women: 5; mixed: 3)

Games
- 1959; 1960; 1961; 1962; 1963; 1964; 1965; 1966; 1967; 1968; 1970; 1970; 1973; 1972; 1975; 1975; 1977; 1978; 1979; 1981; 1983; 1985; 1987; 1989; 1991; 1993; 1995; 1997; 1999; 2001; 2003; 2005; 2007; 2009; 2011; 2013; 2015; 2017; 2019; 2021; 2025

Shooting competition has been in the Universiade in 2007, 2011, 2013, 2015 as an optional sport, then in 2019 and 2021, held in Chengdu, People's Republic of China.

== Editions ==
Games	Year	Host city	Host country	Winner	Second	Third
XXIV	2007	Bangkok	Thailand	Russia	China	Germany
XXVI	2011	Shenzhen	China	China	Italy	South Korea
XXVII	2013	Kazan	Russia	Russia	China	Italy
XXVIII	2015	Gwangju	South Korea	China	South Korea	Italy
XXX	2019	Naples	Italy	Chinese Taipei	Iran	Italy
XXXI	2021	Chengdu	China	India	China	South Korea

== Medal table ==
Updated last time after the 2021 Summer Universiade

Rank	Nation	Gold	Silver	Bronze	Total
1	China (CHN)	46	32	29	107
2	Russia (RUS)	26	29	30	85
3	Italy (ITA)	19	11	7	37
4	South Korea (KOR)	15	20	17	52
5	India (IND)	11	5	8	24
6	Czech Republic (CZE)	8	3	8	19
7	Ukraine (UKR)	6	8	8	22
8	Germany (GER)	6	4	5	15
9	Thailand (THA)	5	10	8	23
10	France (FRA)	4	5	4	13
11	Iran (IRI)	4	3	4	11
12	Chinese Taipei (TPE)	3	2	5	10
13	Cyprus (CYP)	3	1	1	5
14	Kazakhstan (KAZ)	2	7	8	17
15	Slovakia (SVK)	2	3	7	12
16	Belarus (BLR)	2	0	1	3
17	Poland (POL)	1	7	6	14
18	Mongolia (MGL)	1	5	2	8
19	Hungary (HUN)	1	3	1	5
20	Australia (AUS)	1	1	2	4
21	Romania (ROM)	1	0	1	2
21	Turkey (TUR)	1	0	1	2
23	Japan (JPN)	1	0	0	1
24	Serbia (SRB)	0	4	2	6
25	United States (USA)	0	2	1	3
26	Austria (AUT)	0	2	0	2
27	Finland (FIN)	0	1	0	1
27	Great Britain (GBR)	0	1	0	1
29	South Africa (RSA)	0	0	1	1
29	Spain (ESP)	0	0	1	1
29	Sweden (SWE)	0	0	1	1
Totals (31 entries)		169	169	169	507
