= 2018 ISSF World Cup =

The 2018 ISSF World Cup is the annual edition of the ISSF World Cup in the Olympic shooting events, governed by the International Shooting Sport Federation.

Considering 2020 Olympic Games, the ISSF has made many changes in the categories and competition. For the first time, mixed team medal events in 10m Air Pistol, 10m Air Rifle and Trap categories have been introduced officially while 50m Rifle Prone Men, 50m Pistol Men and Double Trap Men, which were earlier part of World Cup Series and Olympic Games has been discontinued from this World Cup series. Which makes the total number of medals in both Men's and Women's section equal.

== Men's results ==
=== Rifle Events ===
50 metre rifle three positions			10 metre air rifle		
Guadalajara Mexico (01-12 Mar)			Guadalajara Mexico (01-12 Mar)		
1st place, gold medalist(s)	Akhil Sheoran (IND)	455.6	1st place, gold medalist(s)	István Péni (HUN)	249.5
2nd place, silver medalist(s)	Bernhard Pickl (AUT)	452.0	2nd place, silver medalist(s)	Alexander Schmirl (AUT)	248.7
3rd place, bronze medalist(s)	István Péni (HUN)	442.3	3rd place, bronze medalist(s)	Ravi Kumar (IND)	226.4
Changwon South Korea (20-30 Apr)			Changwon South Korea (20-30 Apr)		
1st place, gold medalist(s)	Sergey Kamenskiy (RUS)	460.6	1st place, gold medalist(s)	Alexander Dryagin (RUS)	251.1 WR
2nd place, silver medalist(s)	Marco De Nicolo (ITA)	459.0	2nd place, silver medalist(s)	Vladimir Maslennikov (RUS)	250.2
3rd place, bronze medalist(s)	Istvan Peni (HUN)	448.2	3rd place, bronze medalist(s)	István Péni (HUN)	228.5
Fort Benning United States (07-15 May)			Fort Benning United States (07-15 May)		
1st place, gold medalist(s)	Istvan Peni (HUN)	451.4	1st place, gold medalist(s)	Julian Justus (GER)	248.7
2nd place, silver medalist(s)	Steffen Olsen (DEN)	450.2	2nd place, silver medalist(s)	Juho Kurki (FIN)	247.1
3rd place, bronze medalist(s)	Yang Haoran (CHN)	441.0	3rd place, bronze medalist(s)	István Péni (HUN)	226.5
Munich Germany (22-29 May)			Munich Germany (22-29 May)		
1st place, gold medalist(s)	Yang Haoran (CHN)	465.3 WR	1st place, gold medalist(s)	Illia Charheika (BLR)	249.5
2nd place, silver medalist(s)	Sergey Kamenskiy (RUS)	463.4	2nd place, silver medalist(s)	Vladimir Maslennikov (RUS)	248.8
3rd place, bronze medalist(s)	Marco De Nicolo (ITA)	447.7	3rd place, bronze medalist(s)	Lu Shao-Chuan (TPE)	227.9

=== Pistol Events ===
25 metre rapid fire pistol			10 metre air pistol		
Guadalajara Mexico (01-12 Mar)			Guadalajara Mexico (01-12 Mar)		
1st place, gold medalist(s)	Clement Bessaguet (FRA)	29	1st place, gold medalist(s)	Shahzar Rizvi (IND)	242.3 WR
2nd place, silver medalist(s)	Jean Quiquampoix (FRA)	28	2nd place, silver medalist(s)	Christian Reitz (GER)	239.7
3rd place, bronze medalist(s)	Christian Reitz (GER)	24	3rd place, bronze medalist(s)	Jitu Rai (IND)	219.0
Changwon South Korea (20-30 Apr)			Changwon South Korea (20-30 Apr)		
1st place, gold medalist(s)	Kim Jun-hong (KOR)	38 WR	1st place, gold medalist(s)	Artem Chernousov (RUS)	240.0
2nd place, silver medalist(s)	Christian Reitz (GER)	34	2nd place, silver medalist(s)	Shahzar Rizvi (IND)	239.8
3rd place, bronze medalist(s)	Oliver Geis (GER)	29	3rd place, bronze medalist(s)	Samuil Donkov (BUL)	217.1
Fort Benning United States (07-15 May)			Fort Benning United States (07-15 May)		
1st place, gold medalist(s)	Lin Junmin (CHN)	30	1st place, gold medalist(s)	Wu Jiayu (CHN)	241.2
2nd place, silver medalist(s)	Yao Zhaonan (CHN)	28	2nd place, silver medalist(s)	Wang Meng Yi (CHN)	241.0
3rd place, bronze medalist(s)	Jean Quiquampoix (FRA)	22	3rd place, bronze medalist(s)	Pablo Carrera (ESP)	220.6
Munich Germany (22-29 May)			Munich Germany (22-29 May)		
1st place, gold medalist(s)	Lin Junmin (CHN)	32	1st place, gold medalist(s)	Oleh Omelchuk (UKR)	243.6 WR
2nd place, silver medalist(s)	Oliver Geis (GER)	30	2nd place, silver medalist(s)	Christian Reitz (GER)	242.4
3rd place, bronze medalist(s)	Jorge Alvarez (CUB)	25	3rd place, bronze medalist(s)	Pu Qifeng (CHN)	221.1

=== Shotgun Events ===
Trap			Skeet		
Guadalajara Mexico (01-12 Mar)			Guadalajara Mexico (01-12 Mar)		
1st place, gold medalist(s)	Lyndon Sosa (LUX)	46	1st place, gold medalist(s)	Vincent Hancock (USA)	59 EWR S-off 6
2nd place, silver medalist(s)	Emanuel Buccolieri (ITA)	45	2nd place, silver medalist(s)	Paul Adams (AUS)	59 EWR S-off 5
3rd place, bronze medalist(s)	Vesa Törnroos (FIN)	32	3rd place, bronze medalist(s)	Tammaro Cassandro (ITA)	49
Changwon South Korea (20-30 Apr)			Changwon South Korea (20-30 Apr)		
1st place, gold medalist(s)	Mauro De Filippis (ITA)	45	1st place, gold medalist(s)	Vincent Hancock (USA)	59 EWR
2nd place, silver medalist(s)	Jiří Lipták (CZE)	42	2nd place, silver medalist(s)	Gabriele Rossetti (ITA)	55
3rd place, bronze medalist(s)	Yavuz İlnam (TUR)	34	3rd place, bronze medalist(s)	Juan Jose Aramburu (ESP)	43
Siġġiewi Malta (05-15 June)			Siġġiewi Malta (05-15 June)		
1st place, gold medalist(s)	Aaron Heading (GBR)	42	1st place, gold medalist(s)	Vincent Hancock (USA)	56
2nd place, silver medalist(s)	Du Yu (CHN)	38	2nd place, silver medalist(s)	Azmy Mehelba (EGY)	54
3rd place, bronze medalist(s)	Marian Kovacocy (SVK)	30	3rd place, bronze medalist(s)	Gabriele Rossetti (ITA)	45
Tucson United States (09-19 July)			Tucson United States (09-19 July)		
1st place, gold medalist(s)	Simone Prosperi (ITA)	43	1st place, gold medalist(s)	Jongjin Lee (KOR)	54
2nd place, silver medalist(s)	Erminio Frasca (ITA)	41	2nd place, silver medalist(s)	Giancarlo Tazza (ITA)	53
3rd place, bronze medalist(s)	Nathan Hales (GBR)	30	3rd place, bronze medalist(s)	Stefan Nilsson (SWE)	42

== Women's Results ==
=== Rifle Events ===
50 metre rifle three positions			10 metre air rifle		
Guadalajara Mexico (01-12 Mar)			Guadalajara Mexico (01-12 Mar)		
1st place, gold medalist(s)	Pei Ruijiao (CHN)	455.4	1st place, gold medalist(s)	Laura-Georgetae Coman (ROU)	251.5
2nd place, silver medalist(s)	Anjum Modgil (IND)	454.2	2nd place, silver medalist(s)	Xu Hong (CHN)	251.0
3rd place, bronze medalist(s)	Sun Ting (CHN)	442.2	3rd place, bronze medalist(s)	Mehuli Ghosh (IND)	228.4
Changwon South Korea (20-30 Apr)			Changwon South Korea (20-30 Apr)		
1st place, gold medalist(s)	Zeru Wang (CHN)	458.3	1st place, gold medalist(s)	Zhao Ruozhu (CHN)	252.4 WR, WRJ
2nd place, silver medalist(s)	Franziska Peer (AUT)	458.2	2nd place, silver medalist(s)	Lin Ying-Shin (TPE)	251.0
3rd place, bronze medalist(s)	Ziva Dvorsak (SLO)	445.4	3rd place, bronze medalist(s)	Jenny Stene (NOR)	229.1
Fort Benning United States (07-15 May)			Fort Benning United States (07-15 May)		
1st place, gold medalist(s)	Snjezana Pejcic (CRO)	460.0	1st place, gold medalist(s)	Wu Mingyang (CHN)	252.2
2nd place, silver medalist(s)	Jiang Ting (CHN)	455.0	2nd place, silver medalist(s)	Zhu Yingjie (CHN)	251.8
3rd place, bronze medalist(s)	Wang Zeru (CHN)	440.4	3rd place, bronze medalist(s)	Zhao Ruozhu (CHN)	230.2
Munich Germany (22-29 May)			Munich Germany (22-29 May)		
1st place, gold medalist(s)	Elaheh Ahmadi (IRI)	455.4	1st place, gold medalist(s)	Lin Ying-Shin (TPE)	250.3
2nd place, silver medalist(s)	Chen Dongqi (CHN)	454.1	2nd place, silver medalist(s)	Wu Mingyang (CHN)	249.8
3rd place, bronze medalist(s)	Zhang Binbin (CHN)	444.0	3rd place, bronze medalist(s)	Rikke Maeng Ibsen (DEN)	229.0

=== Pistol Events ===
25 metre pistol			10 metre air pistol		
Guadalajara Mexico (01-12 Mar)			Guadalajara Mexico (01-12 Mar)		
1st place, gold medalist(s)	Anna Korakaki (GRE)	29	1st place, gold medalist(s)	Manu Bhaker (IND)	237.5
2nd place, silver medalist(s)	Doreen Vennekamp (GER)	27	2nd place, silver medalist(s)	Alejandra Zavala Vázquez (MEX)	237.1
3rd place, bronze medalist(s)	Mathilde Lamolle (FRA)	24 S-off-4	3rd place, bronze medalist(s)	Céline Goberville (FRA)	217.0
Changwon South Korea (20-30 Apr)			Changwon South Korea (20-30 Apr)		
1st place, gold medalist(s)	Elena Galiabovitch (AUS)	34 S-off-2+3	1st place, gold medalist(s)	Viktoria Chaika (BLR)	241.7
2nd place, silver medalist(s)	Lin Yuemei (CHN)	34 S-off-2+2	2nd place, silver medalist(s)	Ji Xiaojing (CHN)	241.2
3rd place, bronze medalist(s)	Yao Yushi (CHN)	30	3rd place, bronze medalist(s)	Zorana Arunović (SRB)	219.2
Fort Benning United States (07-15 May)			Fort Benning United States (07-15 May)		
1st place, gold medalist(s)	Maria Grozdeva (BUL)	35	1st place, gold medalist(s)	Anna Korakaki (GRE)	243.7
2nd place, silver medalist(s)	Zorana Arunović (SRB)	32 S-off: 5+4	2nd place, silver medalist(s)	Zorana Arunović (SRB)	240.1
3rd place, bronze medalist(s)	Anna Korakaki (GRE)	29 SO, S-off: 5+3	3rd place, bronze medalist(s)	Pim-On Klaisuban (THA)	219.1
Munich Germany (22-29 May)			Munich Germany (22-29 May)		
1st place, gold medalist(s)	Xiong Yaxuan (CHN)	31	1st place, gold medalist(s)	Olena Kostevych (UKR)	240.1
2nd place, silver medalist(s)	Yao Yushi (CHN)	29	2nd place, silver medalist(s)	Wang Qian (CHN)	238.9
3rd place, bronze medalist(s)	Olena Kostevych (UKR)	24 S-off: 3	3rd place, bronze medalist(s)	Kim Min-jung (KOR)	219.5

=== Shotgun Events ===
Trap			Skeet		
Guadalajara Mexico (01-12 Mar)			Guadalajara Mexico (01-12 Mar)		
1st place, gold medalist(s)	Ashley Carroll (USA)	48 WR	1st place, gold medalist(s)	Kimberly Rhode (USA)	56
2nd place, silver medalist(s)	Catherine Skinner (AUS)	44	2nd place, silver medalist(s)	Caitlin Connor (USA)	52
3rd place, bronze medalist(s)	Aeriel Alease Skinner (USA)	34	3rd place, bronze medalist(s)	Amber Hill (GBR)	42
Changwon South Korea (20-30 Apr)			Changwon South Korea (20-30 Apr)		
1st place, gold medalist(s)	Satu Mäkelä-Nummela (FIN)	41	1st place, gold medalist(s)	Kimberly Rhode (USA)	58 WR
2nd place, silver medalist(s)	Fátima Gálvez (ESP)	37	2nd place, silver medalist(s)	Amber Hill (GBR)	55
3rd place, bronze medalist(s)	Alessandra Perilli (SMR)	27	3rd place, bronze medalist(s)	Amber English (USA)	44
Siġġiewi Malta (05-15 June)			Siġġiewi Malta (05-15 June)		
1st place, gold medalist(s)	Satu Mäkelä-Nummela (FIN)	44	1st place, gold medalist(s)	Amber Hill (GBR)	52
2nd place, silver medalist(s)	Katrin Quooss (GER)	41	2nd place, silver medalist(s)	Amber English (USA)	48
3rd place, bronze medalist(s)	Ekaterina Rabaya (RUS)	30	3rd place, bronze medalist(s)	Zhang Donglian (CHN)	40
Tucson United States (09-19 Jul)			Tucson United States (09-19 Jul)		
1st place, gold medalist(s)	Marika Salmi (FIN)	41	1st place, gold medalist(s)	Kimberly Rhode (USA)	55
2nd place, silver medalist(s)	Fatima Galvez (ESP)	41	2nd place, silver medalist(s)	Caitlin Connor (USA)	55
3rd place, bronze medalist(s)	Melanie Couzy (FRA)	31	3rd place, bronze medalist(s)	Lucie Anastassiou (FRA)	44

== Mixed Team Results ==
	10 metre air pistol		10 metre air rifle		Trap	
Guadalajara Mexico (01-12 Mar)	1st place, gold medalist(s)	Manu Bhaker / Om Prakash Mitharval (IND)	1st place, gold medalist(s)	Xu Hong / Chen Keduo (CHN)	1st place, gold medalist(s)	Satu Mäkelä-Nummela / Vesa Törnroos (FIN)
Guadalajara Mexico (01-12 Mar)	2nd place, silver medalist(s)	Sandra Reitz / Christian Reitz (GER)	2nd place, silver medalist(s)	Laura-Georgetae Coman / Alin Moldoveanu (ROU)	2nd place, silver medalist(s)	Zang Xinqiu / He Weidong (CHN)
Guadalajara Mexico (01-12 Mar)	3rd place, bronze medalist(s)	Céline Goberville / Florian Fouquet (FRA)	3rd place, bronze medalist(s)	Mehuli Ghosh /Deepak Kumar (IND)	3rd place, bronze medalist(s)	Aeriel Skinner / Mick Wertz (USA)
Changwon South Korea (20-30 Apr)	1st place, gold medalist(s)	Jiayu Wu / Xiaojing Ji (CHN)	1st place, gold medalist(s)	Ruozhu Zhao / Yang Haoran (CHN)	1st place, gold medalist(s)	Zuzana Štefečeková / Erik Varga (SVK)
Changwon South Korea (20-30 Apr)	2nd place, silver medalist(s)	Christian Reitz / Sandra Reitz (GER)	2nd place, silver medalist(s)	Daria Vdovina / Vladimir Maslennikov (RUS)	2nd place, silver medalist(s)	Penny Smith / Jack Wallace (AUS)
Changwon South Korea (20-30 Apr)	3rd place, bronze medalist(s)	Damir Mikec / Zorana Arunovic (SRB)	3rd place, bronze medalist(s)	Song Soo-joo / Keum Ji-hyeon (KOR)	3rd place, bronze medalist(s)	Sarah Alhawal / Khaled Al-Mudhaf (KUW)
Fort Benning United States (07-15 May)	1st place, gold medalist(s)	Sonia Franquet / Pablo Carrera (ESP)	1st place, gold medalist(s)	Ruozhu Zhao / Yang Haoran (CHN)	No Shotgun Competition	
Fort Benning United States (07-15 May)	2nd place, silver medalist(s)	Damir Mikec / Zorana Arunovic (SRB)	2nd place, silver medalist(s)	Wu Mingyang / Yao Yungcong (CHN)	No Shotgun Competition	
Fort Benning United States (07-15 May)	3rd place, bronze medalist(s)	Anna Korakaki / Dionysios Korakakis (GRE)	3rd place, bronze medalist(s)	Selina Gschwandtner / Julian Justus (GER)	No Shotgun Competition	
Munich Germany (22-29 May)	1st place, gold medalist(s)	Olena Kostevych / Oleh Omelchuk (UKR)	1st place, gold medalist(s)	Anastasiia Galashina / Sergey Kamenskiy (RUS)	No Shotgun Competition	
Munich Germany (22-29 May)	2nd place, silver medalist(s)	Damir Mikec / Zorana Arunovic (SRB)	2nd place, silver medalist(s)	Wu Mingyang / Song Buhan (CHN)	No Shotgun Competition	
Munich Germany (22-29 May)	3rd place, bronze medalist(s)	Xiong Yaxuan / Pu Qifeng (CHN)	3rd place, bronze medalist(s)	Wang Luyao / Yu Haonan (CHN)	No Shotgun Competition	
Siġġiewi Malta (05-15 June)	No Rifle/Pistol Competition				1st place, gold medalist(s)	Zuzana Štefečeková / Erik Varga (SVK)
Siġġiewi Malta (05-15 June)	No Rifle/Pistol Competition				2nd place, silver medalist(s)	Silvana Stanco / Emanuele Buccolieri (ITA)
Siġġiewi Malta (05-15 June)	No Rifle/Pistol Competition				3rd place, bronze medalist(s)	Jessica Rossi / Giovanni Pellielo (ITA)
Tucson United States (09-19 Jul)	No Rifle/Pistol Competition				1st place, gold medalist(s)	Corey Cogdell / Casey Wallace (USA)
Tucson United States (09-19 Jul)	No Rifle/Pistol Competition				2nd place, silver medalist(s)	Melanie Couzy / Sebastien Guerrero (FRA)
Tucson United States (09-19 Jul)	No Rifle/Pistol Competition				3rd place, bronze medalist(s)	Kayle Browning / Will Hinton (USA)

== Overall Medal Tally* ==
Rank	Nation	Gold	Silver	Bronze	Total
1	China	13	15	10	38
2	United States	8	3	4	15
3	India	4	2	4	10
4	Russia	4	2	1	7
5	Finland	4	1	1	6
6	Ukraine	3	0	1	4
7	Italy	2	6	4	12
8	Great Britain	2	1	2	5
9	Chinese Taipei (Taiwan)	2	1	0	3
10	Hungary	2	0	4	6
11	Greece	2	0	2	4
11	South Korea	2	0	2	4
13	Slovakia	2	0	1	3
14	Belarus	2	0	0	2
15	Germany	1	8	3	12
16	Australia	1	3	0	4
17	France	1	2	6	9
18	Spain	1	2	2	5
19	Romania	1	1	0	2
20	Bulgaria	1	0	1	2
21	Croatia	1	0	0	1
21	Iran	1	0	0	1
21	Luxembourg	1	0	0	1
24	Serbia	0	4	2	6
25	Austria	0	3	0	3
26	Denmark	0	1	1	2
27	Czech Republic	0	1	0	1
27	Egypt	0	1	0	1
27	Mexico	0	1	0	1
30	Cuba	0	0	1	1
30	Kuwait	0	0	1	1
30	Norway	0	0	1	1
30	Slovenia	0	0	1	1
30	San Marino	0	0	1	1
30	Sweden	0	0	1	1
30	Thailand	0	0	1	1
30	Turkey	0	0	1	1
Total	37 Nations	60	60	60	180

- *After ISSF World Cup 2018, Tucson, USA
