= Shooting at the 2018 Asian Games – Men's 10 metre air pistol =

Men's 10 metre air pistol at the 2018 Asian Games
- Venue: Jakabaring Shooting Range
- Dates: 21 August 2018
- Competitors: 41 from 23 nations

Medalists
gold medal	Saurabh Chaudhary	India
silver medal	Tomoyuki Matsuda	Japan
bronze medal	Abhishek Verma	India

The men's 10 metre air pistol event at the 2018 Asian Games in Palembang, Indonesia took place on 21 August at the Jakabaring International Shooting Range.

== Schedule ==
All times are Western Indonesia Time (UTC+07:00)

Date	Time	Event
Tuesday, 21 August 2018	09:00	Qualification
Tuesday, 21 August 2018	11:45	Final

== Records ==
Prior to this competition, the existing world, Asian and Games records were as follows.

Qualification
World Record	Jin Jong-oh (KOR)	594	Changwon, South Korea	12 April 2009
Asian Record	Jin Jong-oh (KOR)	594	Changwon, South Korea	12 April 2009
Games Record	Tan Zongliang (CHN)	590	Busan, South Korea	3 October 2002
Final
World Record	Oleh Omelchuk (UKR)	243.6	Munich, Germany	25 May 2018
Asian Record	Shahzar Rizvi (IND)	242.3	Guadalajara, Mexico	3 March 2018
Games Record	—	—	—	—

== Results ==
Legend

- DNS — Did not start

=== Qualification ===
Rank	Athlete	Series						Total	Xs	Notes
Rank	Athlete	1	2	3	4	5	6	Total	Xs	Notes
1	Saurabh Chaudhary (IND)	99	99	93	98	98	99	586	23	
2	Jin Jong-oh (KOR)	98	97	97	97	96	99	584	28	
3	Wu Jiayu (CHN)	98	96	98	98	97	95	582	20	
4	Tomoyuki Matsuda (JPN)	98	98	97	98	95	95	581	24	
5	Wang Mengyi (CHN)	96	97	96	96	98	98	581	19	
6	Abhishek Verma (IND)	96	97	95	96	97	99	580	21	
7	Vladimir Issachenko (KAZ)	98	94	96	99	97	95	579	23	
8	Lee Dae-myung (KOR)	99	97	96	94	96	97	579	21	
9	Hoàng Xuân Vinh (VIE)	97	98	97	96	94	97	579	18	
10	Gai Bin (SGP)	99	98	95	96	96	94	578	21	
11	Ye Tun Naung (MYA)	95	96	98	98	95	95	577	18	
12	Yoshinobu Sonoda (JPN)	97	96	92	97	97	96	575	19	
13	Kim Song-guk (PRK)	95	98	93	96	98	95	575	18	
14	Trần Quốc Cường (VIE)	97	92	97	96	97	95	574	21	
15	Shirgalyn Buyanzayaa (MGL)	94	96	97	94	94	99	574	17	
16	Natphanlert Auapinyakul (THA)	96	94	94	95	98	97	574	14	
17	Atallah Al-Anazi (KSA)	95	97	93	98	97	93	573	15	
18	Rashid Yunusmetov (KAZ)	96	97	94	95	92	99	573	13	
19	Enkhtaivany Davaakhüü (MGL)	97	94	97	98	95	92	573	12	
20	Pongpol Kulchairattana (THA)	94	93	96	95	97	97	572	20	
21	Javad Foroughi (IRI)	93	94	95	96	95	99	572	15	
22	Shakil Ahmed (BAN)	95	96	94	94	96	95	570	19	
23	Deny Pratama (INA)	96	96	94	92	97	95	570	14	
24	Johnathan Wong (MAS)	94	94	97	96	96	93	570	12	
25	Ebrahim Barkhordari (IRI)	96	94	96	93	96	94	569	17	
26	Man Chun Kit (HKG)	92	91	97	96	96	96	568	13	
27	Ismail Al-Abri (OMA)	94	92	95	94	96	95	566	13	
28	Kyaw Swar Win (MYA)	95	95	91	97	97	91	566	13	
29	Wong Han Xuan (SGP)	94	93	96	95	92	95	565	17	
30	Wong Siu Lung (HKG)	93	97	94	94	95	92	565	11	
31	Ahmed Al-Ameeri (UAE)	96	89	91	92	96	96	560	11	
32	Safar Al-Dosari (KSA)	97	90	93	93	92	95	560	11	
33	Iwan Setiawan (INA)	95	92	92	96	89	94	558	10	
34	Bezhan Fayzullaev (TJK)	92	90	94	91	93	95	555	5	
35	Osama Al-Shaiba (QAT)	94	92	92	92	92	92	554	10	
36	Piash Hossain (BAN)	92	91	90	94	90	90	547	11	
37	Othman Al-Blooshi (UAE)	93	90	88	88	92	93	544	9	
38	Phatthana Phalichan (LAO)	91	84	84	90	93	89	531	8	
39	Sergei Arzamastsev (KGZ)	82	82	86	83	87	88	508	8	
40	Sanzharbek Erkinbaev (KGZ)	95	90	96	96	64	51	492	16	
—	Ahmad Zayed Al-Shamari (QAT)							DNS		

=== Final ===
Rank	Athlete	1st stage		2nd stage – Elimination							S-off	Notes
Rank	Athlete	1	2	1	2	3	4	5	6	7	S-off	Notes
1st place, gold medalist(s)	Saurabh Chaudhary (IND)	50.6	101.4	120.0	139.4	159.4	180.0	200.2	220.1	240.7		GR
2nd place, silver medalist(s)	Tomoyuki Matsuda (JPN)	50.6	103.3	122.0	141.9	161.5	180.9	201.3	220.5	239.7		
3rd place, bronze medalist(s)	Abhishek Verma (IND)	50.5	99.4	119.4	139.4	160.8	178.9	199.7	219.3			
4	Wu Jiayu (CHN)	50.7	98.7	118.3	137.7	158.0	178.4	197.6				
5	Jin Jong-oh (KOR)	49.6	99.6	119.8	139.6	159.0	178.4				SO	
6	Lee Dae-myung (KOR)	47.7	96.8	116.5	137.1	156.4						
7	Vladimir Issachenko (KAZ)	48.5	97.9	117.9	136.1							
8	Wang Mengyi (CHN)	46.9	95.6	114.6								
