= 2019 ISSF World Cup =

Shooting competition

- Sport: Shooting
- Hosts: (India) New Delhi (Mexico) Acapulco (United Arab Emirates) Al Ain (China) Beijing (South Korea) Changwon (Finland) Lahti (Germany) Munich (Brazil) Rio de Janeiro (China) Putian
- Duration: 20 February – 23 November

Seasons
- ← 2018 2020 →

The 2019 ISSF World Cup is the annual edition of the ISSF World Cup in the Olympic shooting events, governed by the International Shooting Sport Federation.

The World Cup series also acted as the qualification tournaments for the 2020 Olympic Games. India emerged as the most successful nation in the series, topping medal table in all Rifle-Pistol World Cups and Finals.

== Men's results ==
=== Rifle events ===
| 50 metre rifle three positions | | | 10 metre air rifle | | |
|---|---|---|---|---|---|
| New Delhi India (20-28 Feb) | | | New Delhi India (20-28 Feb) | | |
| 1st place, gold medalist(s) | István Péni (HUN) | 459.1 | 1st place, gold medalist(s) | Sergey Kamenskiy (RUS) | 249.4 |
| 2nd place, silver medalist(s) | Sergey Kamenskiy (RUS) | 459.0 | 2nd place, silver medalist(s) | Liu Yukun (CHN) | 247.0 |
| 3rd place, bronze medalist(s) | Marco De Nicolo (ITA) | 444.5 | 3rd place, bronze medalist(s) | Hui Zicheng (CHN) | 225.9 |
| Beijing China (21-29 Apr) | | | Beijing China (21-29 Apr) | | |
| 1st place, gold medalist(s) | Filip Nepejchal (CZE) | 458.7 WRJ | 1st place, gold medalist(s) | Hui Zicheng (CHN) | 249.4 |
| 2nd place, silver medalist(s) | Sergey Kamenskiy (RUS) | 458.1 | 2nd place, silver medalist(s) | Divyansh Singh Panwar (IND) | 249.0 |
| 3rd place, bronze medalist(s) | Zhao Zhonghao (CHN) | 445.1 | 3rd place, bronze medalist(s) | Grigorii Shamakov (RUS) | 227.5 |
| Munich Germany (24-31 May)' | | | Munich Germany (24-31 May) | | |
| 1st place, gold medalist(s) | Zhao Zhonghao (CHN) | 461.8 | 1st place, gold medalist(s) | Filip Nepejchal (CZE) | 250.8 |
| 2nd place, silver medalist(s) | Kim Jong-hyun (KOR) | 455.6 | 2nd place, silver medalist(s) | Petar Gorša (CRO) | 249.5 |
| 3rd place, bronze medalist(s) | Hui Zicheng (CHN) | 445.7 | 3rd place, bronze medalist(s) | Yang Haoran (CHN) | 229.0 |
| Rio de Janeiro Brazil (26 Aug-03 Sep) | | | Rio de Janeiro Brazil (26 Aug-03 Sep) | | |
| 1st place, gold medalist(s) | Petar Gorša (CRO) | 462.2 | 1st place, gold medalist(s) | Yu Haonan (CHN) | 252.8 WR, WRJ |
| 2nd place, silver medalist(s) | Sanjeev Rajput (IND) | 462.0 | 2nd place, silver medalist(s) | Petar Gorša (CRO) | 249.9 |
| 3rd place, bronze medalist(s) | Zhang Changhong (CHN) | 449.2 | 3rd place, bronze medalist(s) | Patrik Jány (SVK) | 228.8 |
| Final: Putian China (17-23 Nov) | | | Final: Putian China (17-23 Nov) | | |
| 1st place, gold medalist(s) | Filip Nepejchal (CZE) | 462.9 WRJ | 1st place, gold medalist(s) | Divyansh Singh Panwar (IND) | 250.1 |
| 2nd place, silver medalist(s) | Milenko Sebić (SRB) | 461.5 | 2nd place, silver medalist(s) | István Péni (HUN) | 250.0 |
| 3rd place, bronze medalist(s) | Sergey Kamenskiy (RUS) | 449.8 | 3rd place, bronze medalist(s) | Patrik Jány (SVK) | 228.4 |

=== Pistol events ===
| 25 metre rapid fire pistol | | | 10 metre air pistol | | |
|---|---|---|---|---|---|
| New Delhi India (20-28 Feb) | | | New Delhi India (20-28 Feb) | | |
| 1st place, gold medalist(s) | Christian Reitz (GER) | 35 | 1st place, gold medalist(s) | Saurabh Chaudhary (IND) | 245.0 WR |
| 2nd place, silver medalist(s) | Lin Junmin (CHN) | 31 | 2nd place, silver medalist(s) | Damir Mikec (SRB) | 239.3 |
| 3rd place, bronze medalist(s) | Kim Jun-hong (KOR) | 22 | 3rd place, bronze medalist(s) | Wei Pang (CHN) | 215.2 |
| Beijing China (21-29 Apr) | | | Beijing China (21-29 Apr) | | |
| 1st place, gold medalist(s) | Lin Junmin (CHN) | 35 | 1st place, gold medalist(s) | Abhishek Verma (IND) | 242.7 |
| 2nd place, silver medalist(s) | Oliver Geis (GER) | 31 | 2nd place, silver medalist(s) | Artem Chernousov (RUS) | 240.4 |
| 3rd place, bronze medalist(s) | Jean Quiquampoix (FRA) | 27 | 3rd place, bronze medalist(s) | Han Seung-woo (KOR) | 220.0 |
| Munich Germany (24-31 May) | | | Munich Germany (24-31 May) | | |
| 1st place, gold medalist(s) | Lin Junmin (CHN) | 32 | 1st place, gold medalist(s) | Saurabh Chaudhary (IND) | 246.3 WR, WRJ |
| 2nd place, silver medalist(s) | Clément Bessaguet (FRA) | 30 | 2nd place, silver medalist(s) | Artem Chernousov (RUS) | 243.8 |
| 3rd place, bronze medalist(s) | Jean Quiquampoix (FRA) | 25 | 3rd place, bronze medalist(s) | Pang Wei (CHN) | 220.7 |
| Rio de Janeiro Brazil (26 Aug-03 Sep) | | | Rio de Janeiro Brazil (26 Aug-03 Sep) | | |
| 1st place, gold medalist(s) | Christian Reitz (GER) | 34 | 1st place, gold medalist(s) | Abhishek Verma (IND) | 244.2 |
| 2nd place, silver medalist(s) | Oliver Geis (GER) | 32 | 2nd place, silver medalist(s) | İsmail Keleş (TUR) | 243.1 |
| 3rd place, bronze medalist(s) | Li Yuehong (CHN) | 25 | 3rd place, bronze medalist(s) | Saurabh Chaudhary (IND) | 221.9 |
| Final: Putian China (17-23 Nov) | | | Final: Putian China (17-23 Nov) | | |
| 1st place, gold medalist(s) | Clément Bessaguet (FRA) | 32 | 1st place, gold medalist(s) | Pang Wei (CHN) | 243.7 |
| 2nd place, silver medalist(s) | Christian Reitz (GER) | 31 | 2nd place, silver medalist(s) | Park Dae-hun (KOR) | 241.7 |
| 3rd place, bronze medalist(s) | Jean Quiquampoix (FRA) | 26 | 3rd place, bronze medalist(s) | Artem Chernousov (RUS) | 220.6 |

=== Shotgun event ===
| Trap | | | Skeet | | |
|---|---|---|---|---|---|
| Acapulco Mexico (15-26 Mar) | | | Acapulco Mexico (15-26 Mar) | | |
| 1st place, gold medalist(s) | James Willett (AUS) | 47 | 1st place, gold medalist(s) | Vincent Hancock (USA) | 60 EWR |
| 2nd place, silver medalist(s) | Ahmed Zaher (EGY) | 43 | 2nd place, silver medalist(s) | Gabriele Rossetti (ITA) | 58 |
| 3rd place, bronze medalist(s) | Yu Haicheng (CHN) | 35 | 3rd place, bronze medalist(s) | Jakub Tomeček (CZE) | 49 |
| Al Ain United Arab Emirates (05-14 Apr) | | | Al Ain United Arab Emirates (05-14 Apr) | | |
| 1st place, gold medalist(s) | Josip Glasnović (CRO) | 47 S-off:9 | 1st place, gold medalist(s) | Mansour Al-Rashedi (KUW) | 56 |
| 2nd place, silver medalist(s) | Savate Sresthaporn (THA) | 47 S-off:8 | 2nd place, silver medalist(s) | Jesper Hansen (DEN) | 54 |
| 3rd place, bronze medalist(s) | Paul Pigorsch (GER) | 34 | 3rd place, bronze medalist(s) | Luke Argiro (AUS) | 42 |
| Changwon South Korea (07-18 May) | | | Changwon South Korea (07-18 May) | | |
| 1st place, gold medalist(s) | Andreas Makri (CYP) | 45 S-off:6 | 1st place, gold medalist(s) | Vincent Hancock (USA) | 57 |
| 2nd place, silver medalist(s) | Matthew Coward-Holley (GBR) | 45 S-off:5 | 2nd place, silver medalist(s) | Christian Elliott (USA) | 53 |
| 3rd place, bronze medalist(s) | James Willett (AUS) | 37 | 3rd place, bronze medalist(s) | Mansour Al-Rashedi (KUW) | 45 |
| Lahti Finland (13-23 Aug) | | | Lahti Finland (13-23 Aug) | | |
| 1st place, gold medalist(s) | Alexey Alipov (RUS) | 43 S-off:2 | 1st place, gold medalist(s) | Luigi Lodde (ITA) | 55 S-off:5 |
| 2nd place, silver medalist(s) | João Azevedo (POR) | 43 S-off:1 | 2nd place, silver medalist(s) | Éric Delaunay (FRA) | 55 S-off:4 |
| 3rd place, bronze medalist(s) | Mauro De Filippis (ITA) | 34 | 3rd place, bronze medalist(s) | Azmy Mehelba (EGY) | 46 |
| Final: Al Ain United Arab Emirates (08-15 Oct) | | | Final: Al Ain United Arab Emirates (08-15 Oct) | | |
| 1st place, gold medalist(s) | Mauro De Filippis (ITA) | 44 | 1st place, gold medalist(s) | Luigi Lodde (ITA) | 60 |
| 2nd place, silver medalist(s) | Alexey Alipov (RUS) | 41 | 2nd place, silver medalist(s) | Vincent Hancock (USA) | 59 |
| 3rd place, bronze medalist(s) | Alberto Fernández (ESP) | 34 | 3rd place, bronze medalist(s) | Azmy Mehelba (EGY) | 49 |

== Women's results ==
=== Rifle events ===
| 50 metre rifle three positions | | | 10 metre air rifle | | |
|---|---|---|---|---|---|
| New Delhi India (20-28 Feb) | | | New Delhi India (20-28 Feb) | | |
| 1st place, gold medalist(s) | Nina Christen (SUI) | 457.1 | 1st place, gold medalist(s) | Apurvi Chandela (IND) | 252.9 WR |
| 2nd place, silver medalist(s) | Shi Mengyao (CHN) | 456.6 | 2nd place, silver medalist(s) | Zhao Ruozhu (CHN) | 251.8 |
| 3rd place, bronze medalist(s) | Yelizaveta Korol (KAZ) | 445.7 | 3rd place, bronze medalist(s) | Xu Hong (CHN) | 230.4 |
| Beijing China (21-29 Apr) | | | Beijing China (21-29 Apr) | | |
| 1st place, gold medalist(s) | Snježana Pejčić (CRO) | 464.0 | 1st place, gold medalist(s) | Yulia Karimova (RUS) | 251.1 |
| 2nd place, silver medalist(s) | Bae Sang-hee (KOR) | 459.5 | 2nd place, silver medalist(s) | Kwon Eun-ji (KOR) | 250.2 |
| 3rd place, bronze medalist(s) | Jeanette Hegg Duestad (NOR) | 447.1 | 3rd place, bronze medalist(s) | Keum Ji-hyeon (KOR) | 228.0 |
| Munich Germany (24-31 May) | | | Munich Germany (24-31 May) | | |
| 1st place, gold medalist(s) | Yulia Zykova (RUS) | 461.6 | 1st place, gold medalist(s) | Apurvi Chandela (IND) | 251.0 |
| 2nd place, silver medalist(s) | Seonaid McIntosh (GBR) | 461.4 | 2nd place, silver medalist(s) | Wang Luyao (CHN) | 250.8 |
| 3rd place, bronze medalist(s) | Katrine Lund (NOR) | 450.2 | 3rd place, bronze medalist(s) | Xu Hong (CHN) | 229.4 |
| Rio de Janeiro Brazil (26 Aug-03 Sep) | | | Rio de Janeiro Brazil (26 Aug-03 Sep) | | |
| 1st place, gold medalist(s) | Seonaid McIntosh (GBR) | 461.2 | 1st place, gold medalist(s) | Elavenil Valarivan (IND) | 251.7 |
| 2nd place, silver medalist(s) | Kim Je-hee (KOR) | 458.4 | 2nd place, silver medalist(s) | Seonaid McIntosh (GBR) | 250.6 |
| 3rd place, bronze medalist(s) | Pei Ruijiao (CHN) | 448.1 | 3rd place, bronze medalist(s) | Lin Ying-shin (TPE) | 229.9 |
| Final: Putian China (17-23 Nov) | | | Final: Putian China (17-23 Nov) | | |
| 1st place, gold medalist(s) | Seonaid McIntosh (GBR) | 462.1 | 1st place, gold medalist(s) | Elavenil Valarivan (IND) | 250.8 |
| 2nd place, silver medalist(s) | Pei Ruijiao (CHN) | 457.4 | 2nd place, silver medalist(s) | Lin Ying-shin (TPE) | 250.7 |
| 3rd place, bronze medalist(s) | Nina Christen (SUI) | 449.1 | 3rd place, bronze medalist(s) | Laura-Georgeta Coman (ROU) | 229.0 |

=== Pistol events ===
| 25 metre pistol | | | 10 metre air pistol | | |
|---|---|---|---|---|---|
| New Delhi India (20-28 Feb) | | | New Delhi India (20-28 Feb) | | |
| 1st place, gold medalist(s) | Veronika Major (HUN) | 40 WR | 1st place, gold medalist(s) | Veronika Major (HUN) | 245.1 |
| 2nd place, silver medalist(s) | Zhang Jingjing (CHN) | 33 | 2nd place, silver medalist(s) | Wu Chia-ying (TPE) | 238.4 |
| 3rd place, bronze medalist(s) | Hanieh Rostamian (IRI) | 30 | 3rd place, bronze medalist(s) | Kim Bo-mi (KOR) | 218.3 |
| Beijing China (21-29 Apr) | | | Beijing China (21-29 Apr) | | |
| 1st place, gold medalist(s) | Maria Grozdeva (BUL) | 36 | 1st place, gold medalist(s) | Kim Min-jung (KOR) | 245.0 |
| 2nd place, silver medalist(s) | Veronika Major (HUN) | 35 | 2nd place, silver medalist(s) | Vitalina Batsarashkina (RUS) | 240.6 |
| 3rd place, bronze medalist(s) | Anna Korakaki (GRE) | 30 | 3rd place, bronze medalist(s) | Veronika Major (HUN) | 220.5 |
| Munich Germany (24-31 May) | | | Munich Germany (24-31 May) | | |
| 1st place, gold medalist(s) | Rahi Sarnobat (IND) | 37 | 1st place, gold medalist(s) | Anna Korakaki (GRE) | 241.4 |
| 2nd place, silver medalist(s) | Olena Kostevych (UKR) | 36 | 2nd place, silver medalist(s) | Qian Wei (CHN) | 239.6 |
| 3rd place, bronze medalist(s) | Antoaneta Boneva (BUL) | 26 | 3rd place, bronze medalist(s) | Kim Min-jung (KOR) | 220.8 |
| Rio de Janeiro Brazil (26 Aug-03 Sep) | | | Rio de Janeiro Brazil (26 Aug-03 Sep) | | |
| 1st place, gold medalist(s) | Veronika Major (HUN) | 35 | 1st place, gold medalist(s) | Yashaswini Singh Deswal (IND) | 236.7 |
| 2nd place, silver medalist(s) | Xiong Yaxuan (CHN) | 33 | 2nd place, silver medalist(s) | Olena Kostevych (UKR) | 234.8 |
| 3rd place, bronze medalist(s) | Tien Chia-chen (TPE) | 28 | 3rd place, bronze medalist(s) | Jasmina Milovanović (SRB) | 215.7 |
| Final: Putian China (17-23 Nov) | | | Final: Putian China (17-23 Nov) | | |
| 1st place, gold medalist(s) | Zhang Jingjing (CHN) | 37 | 1st place, gold medalist(s) | Manu Bhaker (IND) | 244.7 WRJ |
| 2nd place, silver medalist(s) | Kim Min-jung (KOR) | 33 | 2nd place, silver medalist(s) | Zorana Arunović (SRB) | 241.9 |
| 3rd place, bronze medalist(s) | Monika Karsch (GER) | 29 | 3rd place, bronze medalist(s) | Wang Qian (CHN) | 221.8 |

=== Shotgun events ===
| Trap | | | Skeet | | |
|---|---|---|---|---|---|
| Acapulco Mexico (15-26 Mar) | | | Acapulco Mexico (15-26 Mar) | | |
| 1st place, gold medalist(s) | Jessica Rossi (ITA) | 45 | 1st place, gold medalist(s) | Kimberly Rhode (USA) | 57 |
| 2nd place, silver medalist(s) | Laetisha Scanlan (AUS) | 43 | 2nd place, silver medalist(s) | Chloe Tipple (NZL) | 48 |
| 3rd place, bronze medalist(s) | Deng Weiyun (CHN) | 32 | 3rd place, bronze medalist(s) | Zhang Donglian (CHN) | 42 |
| Al Ain United Arab Emirates (05-14 Apr) | | | Al Ain United Arab Emirates (05-14 Apr) | | |
| 1st place, gold medalist(s) | Carole Cormenier (FRA) | 44 | 1st place, gold medalist(s) | Kimberly Rhode (USA) | 53 |
| 2nd place, silver medalist(s) | Kirsty Barr (GBR) | 41 | 2nd place, silver medalist(s) | Francisca Crovetto (CHI) | 52 |
| 3rd place, bronze medalist(s) | Silvana Stanco (ITA) | 33 | 3rd place, bronze medalist(s) | Andri Eleftheriou (CYP) | 41 |
| Changwon South Korea (07-18 May) | | | Changwon South Korea (07-18 May) | | |
| 1st place, gold medalist(s) | Deng Weiyun (CHN) | 46 | 1st place, gold medalist(s) | Kimberly Rhode (USA) | 57 |
| 2nd place, silver medalist(s) | Wang Xiaojing (CHN) | 45 | 2nd place, silver medalist(s) | Diana Bacosi (ITA) | 54 |
| 3rd place, bronze medalist(s) | Ashley Carroll (USA) | 36 | 3rd place, bronze medalist(s) | Chiara Cainero (ITA) | 44 |
| Lahti Finland (13-23 Aug) | | | Lahti Finland (13-23 Aug) | | |
| 1st place, gold medalist(s) | Penny Smith (AUS) | 45 | 1st place, gold medalist(s) | Wei Meng (CHN) | 54 |
| 2nd place, silver medalist(s) | Satu Mäkelä-Nummela (FIN) | 40 | 2nd place, silver medalist(s) | Caitlin Connor (USA) | 52 |
| 3rd place, bronze medalist(s) | Laetisha Scanlan (AUS) | 33 | 3rd place, bronze medalist(s) | Amber English (USA) | 40 |
| Final: Al Ain United Arab Emirates (08-15 Oct) | | | Final: Al Ain United Arab Emirates (08-15 Oct) | | |
| 1st place, gold medalist(s) | Aeriel Skinner (USA) | 43 | 1st place, gold medalist(s) | Wei Meng (CHN) | 59 WR |
| 2nd place, silver medalist(s) | Laetisha Scanlan (AUS) | 41 | 2nd place, silver medalist(s) | Amber Hill (GBR) | 55 |
| 3rd place, bronze medalist(s) | Alessia Iezzi (ITA) | 31 | 3rd place, bronze medalist(s) | Amber English (USA) | 47 |

== Mixed team results ==
| | 10 metre air pistol | | | 10 metre air rifle | | | Trap | | |
|---|---|---|---|---|---|---|---|---|---|
| New Delhi India (20-28 Feb) | 1st place, gold medalist(s) | Saurabh Chaudhary/Manu Bhaker (IND) | 483.4 | 1st place, gold medalist(s) | Zhao Ruozhu/Liu Yukun (CHN) | 503.6 WR | No Shotgun events | | |
| New Delhi India (20-28 Feb) | 2nd place, silver medalist(s) | Jiang Ranxin/Bowen Zhang (CHN) | 477.7 | 2nd place, silver medalist(s) | Laura-Georgeta Coman/Alin George Moldoveanu (ROM) | 496.2 | No Shotgun events | | |
| New Delhi India (20-28 Feb) | 3rd place, bronze medalist(s) | Kim Min-jung/Park Dae-hun (KOR) | 418.8 | 3rd place, bronze medalist(s) | Keum Ji-hyeon/Choo Byoung-gil (KOR) | 433.4 | No Shotgun events | | |
| Acapulco Mexico (15-26 Mar) | No Rifle/Pistol events | | | | | | 1st place, gold medalist(s) | James Willett/Laetisha Scanlan (AUS) | 46 |
| Acapulco Mexico (15-26 Mar) | No Rifle/Pistol events | | | | | | 2nd place, silver medalist(s) | Brian Burrows / Kayle Browning (USA) | 43 |
| Acapulco Mexico (15-26 Mar) | No Rifle/Pistol events | | | | | | 3rd place, bronze medalist(s) | Matthew Coward-Holley / Kirsty Barr (GBR) | 34 |
| Al Ain United Arab Emirates (05-14 Apr) | No Rifle/Pistol events | | | | | | 1st place, gold medalist(s) | Paul Pigorsch / Katrin Quooss (GER) | 47 |
| Al Ain United Arab Emirates (05-14 Apr) | No Rifle/Pistol events | | | | | | 2nd place, silver medalist(s) | Waltor Ellen / Ashley Carroll (USA) | 46 |
| Al Ain United Arab Emirates (05-14 Apr) | No Rifle/Pistol events | | | | | | 3rd place, bronze medalist(s) | Silvana Stanco / Giovanni Pellielo (ITA) | 35 |
| Beijing China (21-29 Apr) | 1st place, gold medalist(s) | Saurabh Chaudhary/Manu Bhaker (IND) | 16 | 1st place, gold medalist(s) | Divyansh Singh Panwar/Anjum Moudgil (IND) | 17 | No Shotgun events | | |
| Beijing China (21-29 Apr) | 2nd place, silver medalist(s) | Pang Wei/Jiang Ranxin (CHN) | 6 | 2nd place, silver medalist(s) | Yang Haoran/Ruxuan Liu (CHN) | 15 | No Shotgun events | | |
| Beijing China (21-29 Apr) | 3rd place, bronze medalist(s) | Vitalina Batsarashkina/Artem Chernousov (RUS) | 16 on BMM | 3rd place, bronze medalist(s) | Grigorii Shamakov /Yulia Karimova (RUS) | 16 on BMM | No Shotgun events | | |
| Changwon South Korea (07-18 May) | No Rifle/Pistol events | | | | | | 1st place, gold medalist(s) | Silvana Stanco /Daniele Resca (ITA) | 42 S-off:5 |
| Changwon South Korea (07-18 May) | No Rifle/Pistol events | | | | | | 2nd place, silver medalist(s) | Ashley Carroll/Derek Haldeman (USA) | 42 S-off:4 |
| Changwon South Korea (07-18 May) | No Rifle/Pistol events | | | | | | 3rd place, bronze medalist(s) | Lin Yi-chun/Yang Kun-pi (TPE) | 46 |
| Munich Germany (24-31 May) | 1st place, gold medalist(s) | Saurabh Chaudhary/Manu Bhaker (IND) | 17 | 1st place, gold medalist(s) | Divyansh Singh Panwar/Anjum Moudgil (IND) | 16 | No Shotgun events | | |
| Munich Germany (24-31 May) | 2nd place, silver medalist(s) | Olena Kostevych/Oleh Omelchuk (UKR) | 9 | 2nd place, silver medalist(s) | Apurvi Chandela/ Deepak Kumar (sport shooter) (IND) | 2 | No Shotgun events | | |
| Munich Germany (24-31 May) | 3rd place, bronze medalist(s) | Wang Qian/Yi meng yang (CHN) | 16 on BMM | 3rd place, bronze medalist(s) | Maria Martynova/Illia Charheika (BLR) | 16 on BMM | No Shotgun events | | |
| Lahti Finland (13-23 Aug) | No Rifle/Pistol events | | | | | | 1st place, gold medalist(s) | Alessandra Perilli / Gian Marco Berti (SMR) | 40 |
| Lahti Finland (13-23 Aug) | No Rifle/Pistol events | | | | | | 2nd place, silver medalist(s) | Selin Ali / Marin Kirilov (BUL) | 38 |
| Lahti Finland (13-23 Aug) | No Rifle/Pistol events | | | | | | 3rd place, bronze medalist(s) | Silvana Stanco / Giovanni Pellielo (ITA) | 40 |
| Rio de Janeiro Brazil (26 Aug-03 Sep) | 1st place, gold medalist(s) | Saurabh Chaudhary/Manu Bhaker (IND) | 17 | 1st place, gold medalist(s) | Deepak Kumar/Apurvi Chandela (IND) | 16 | No Shotgun events | | |
| Rio de Janeiro Brazil (26 Aug-03 Sep) | 2nd place, silver medalist(s) | Abhishek Verma/Yashaswini Singh Deswal (IND) | 15 | 2nd place, silver medalist(s) | Yu Haonan/Yang Qian (CHN) | 6 | No Shotgun events | | |
| Rio de Janeiro Brazil (26 Aug-03 Sep) | 3rd place, bronze medalist(s) | Pang Wei/Jiang Ranxin (CHN) | 16 on BMM | 3rd place, bronze medalist(s) | Divyansh Singh Panwar/Anjum Moudgil (IND) | 16 on BMM | No Shotgun events | | |
| Putian China (17-23 Nov) | 1st place, gold medalist(s) | (India) / (Russia) Manu Bhaker/Artem Chernousov (IND/RUS) | 17 | 1st place, gold medalist(s) | (Croatia) / (India) Snjezana Pejcic/Divyansh Singh Panwar (CRO/IND) | 16 | No Shotgun events | | |
| Putian China (17-23 Nov) | 2nd place, silver medalist(s) | (Greece) / (India) Anna Korakaki/Saurabh Chaudhary(GRC/IND) | 13 | 2nd place, silver medalist(s) | (India) / (China) Apurvi Chandela/Zhang Changhong(IND/CHN) | 14 | No Shotgun events | | |
| Putian China (17-23 Nov) | 3rd place, bronze medalist(s) | (Serbia) / (India) Zorana Arunović/Shahzar Rizvi(SRB/IND) | 17 on BMM | 3rd place, bronze medalist(s) | (United Kingdom) / (China) Seonaid McIntosh/Yu Haonan(GBR/CHN) | 16 on BMM | No Shotgun events | | |

(BMM- Bronze-medal match)

== Overall Medal Table ==
- Updated till 2019 ISSF World Cup Putian (22/11/2019) 03:00 PM

| Rank | Nation | Gold | Silver | Bronze | Total |
|---|---|---|---|---|---|
| 1 | India (IND) | 21 | 6 | 3 | 30 |
| 2 | China (CHN) | 11 | 15 | 18 | 44 |
| 3 | United States (USA) | 6 | 6 | 3 | 15 |
| 4 | Russia (RUS) | 5 | 6 | 5 | 16 |
| 5 | Italy (ITA) | 5 | 2 | 7 | 14 |
| 6 | Hungary (HUN) | 4 | 2 | 1 | 7 |
| 7 | Croatia (CRO) | 4 | 2 | 0 | 6 |
| 8 | Germany (GER) | 3 | 3 | 2 | 8 |
| 9 | Australia (AUS) | 3 | 2 | 4 | 9 |
| 10 | Czech Republic (CZE) | 3 | 0 | 1 | 4 |
| 11 | Great Britain (GBR) | 2 | 5 | 2 | 9 |
| 12 | France (FRA) | 2 | 2 | 2 | 6 |
| 13 | South Korea (KOR) | 1 | 6 | 7 | 14 |
| 14 | Bulgaria (BUL) | 1 | 1 | 1 | 3 |
| 14 | Greece (GRE) | 1 | 1 | 1 | 3 |
| 16 | Cyprus (CYP) | 1 | 0 | 1 | 2 |
| 16 | Kuwait (KUW) | 1 | 0 | 1 | 2 |
| 16 | Switzerland (SUI) | 1 | 0 | 1 | 2 |
| 19 | San Marino (SMR) | 1 | 0 | 0 | 1 |
| 20 | Serbia (SRB) | 0 | 3 | 2 | 5 |
| 21 | Ukraine (UKR) | 0 | 3 | 0 | 3 |
| 22 | Chinese Taipei (TPE) | 0 | 2 | 3 | 5 |
| 23 | Egypt (EGY) | 0 | 1 | 2 | 3 |
| 24 | Romania (ROU) | 0 | 1 | 1 | 2 |
| 25 | Chile (CHI) | 0 | 1 | 0 | 1 |
| 25 | Denmark (DEN) | 0 | 1 | 0 | 1 |
| 25 | Finland (FIN) | 0 | 1 | 0 | 1 |
| 25 | New Zealand (NZL) | 0 | 1 | 0 | 1 |
| 25 | Portugal (POR) | 0 | 1 | 0 | 1 |
| 25 | Thailand (THA) | 0 | 1 | 0 | 1 |
| 25 | Turkey (TUR) | 0 | 1 | 0 | 1 |
| 32 | Norway (NOR) | 0 | 0 | 2 | 2 |
| 32 | Slovakia (SVK) | 0 | 0 | 2 | 2 |
| 34 | Belarus (BLR) | 0 | 0 | 1 | 1 |
| 34 | Iran (IRI) | 0 | 0 | 1 | 1 |
| 34 | Kazakhstan (KAZ) | 0 | 0 | 1 | 1 |
| 34 | Spain (ESP) | 0 | 0 | 1 | 1 |
| Totals (37 entries) | | 76 | 76 | 76 | 228 |
