= 2018 Asian Airgun Championships =

- Host city: Kuwait City, Kuwait
- Dates: 2–12 November 2018
- Main venue: Sheikh Sabah Al-Ahmad Olympic Shooting Complex

The 2018 Asian Airgun Championships were held in Sheikh Sabah Al-Ahmad Olympic Shooting Complex Kuwait City, Kuwait between November 2 and 12, 2018.

== Medal summary ==
=== Men ===
Event	Gold	Silver	Bronze
10 m air pistol	Wu Jiayu; China	Huang Junzhi; China	Zhang Hao; China
10 m air pistol team	China; Huang Junzhi; Wu Jiayu; Zhang Hao	Singapore; Gai Bin; Lin Jingxiang; Sebastian Soon	Kuwait; Saad Al-Ajmi; Ali Al-Mutairi; Hamad Al-Namshan
10 m air rifle	Yang Haoran; China	Cao Yifei; China	Liu Yukun; China
10 m air rifle team	China; Cao Yifei; Liu Yukun; Yang Haoran	Kazakhstan; Ilya Fedin; Alexey Kleimyonov; Yuriy Yurkov	Bahrain; Husain Abduljabbar; Naser Bin Turki; Mahmood Haji

=== Women ===
Event	Gold	Silver	Bronze
10 m air pistol	Jiang Ranxin; China	Teh Xiu Hong; Singapore	Li Xue; China
10 m air pistol team	China; Jiang Ranxin; Li Xue; Wang Qian	Chinese Taipei; Tien Chia-chen; Tu Yi Yi-tzu; Yu Ai-wen	Singapore; Teh Xiu Hong; Teh Xiu Yi; Teo Shun Xie
10 m air rifle	Wu Mingyang; China	Tessa Neo; Singapore	Zhao Ruozhu; China
10 m air rifle team	China; Wang Shuyi; Wu Mingyang; Zhao Ruozhu	Singapore; Tessa Neo; Adele Tan; Martina Veloso	Chinese Taipei; Hung Chien-ching; Pan Chia-wei; Tsai Yi-ting

=== Mixed ===
Event	Gold	Silver	Bronze
10 m air pistol team	China; Wu Jiayu; Jiang Ranxin	China; Wang Mengyi; Wang Qian	Chinese Taipei; Kuo Kuan-ting; Yu Ai-wen
10 m air rifle team	China; Yang Haoran; Zhao Ruozhu	China; Cao Yifei; Wang Shuyi	Japan; Naoya Okada; Ayano Shimizu

== Medal table ==
Rank	Nation	Gold	Silver	Bronze	Total
1	China	10	4	4	18
2	Singapore	0	4	1	5
3	Chinese Taipei	0	1	2	3
4	Kazakhstan	0	1	0	1
5	Bahrain	0	0	1	1
5	Japan	0	0	1	1
5	Kuwait	0	0	1	1
Totals (7 entries)		10	10	10	30
