= Ji Xiaojing =

Chinese sport shooter

Personal information
- Nationality: Chinese
- Born: 18 June 1988 (age 38) Liaoning, China
- Height: 1.65 m (5 ft 5 in)
- Weight: 57 kg (126 lb)

Sport
- Country: China
- Sport: Shooting
- Event(s): 10 m air pistol (AP60); 25 m pistol
- Turned pro: 2002

Achievements and titles
- Highest world ranking: 4 (August 2018)
Medal record
Women's shooting
Representing China
World Championships
Gold medal – first place	2018 Changwon	10 m team air pistol
Asian Games
Gold medal – first place	2018 Jakarta-Palembang	AP60 mixed team

Ji Xiaojing (Chinese: 纪晓晶; pinyin: Jì Xiǎojīng; born 18 June 1988) is a Chinese sport shooter. She mainly competes in the ISSF 10m air pistol event at international shooting competitions. Representing China at the 2018 Asian Games, she claimed her first Asian Games medal, a gold in the AP60 mixed team event, along with Wu Jiayu.

== Career ==
Ji began training in shooting in 2002 at the age of 14. She achieved international recognition after claiming a gold medal in the women's 10m air pistol event and a silver medal in the women's 25m pistol event during the 2013 Asian Air Gun Championships.

Ji also won gold at the 2018 ISSF World Cup in the 10m air pistol mixed team event with Wu Jiayu. She additionally clinched a silver medal in the women's 10 m air pistol event at the 2018 ISSF World Cup.

She qualified to compete at the 2018 Asian Games, her first Asian Games appearance, and won a gold medal in the mixed team category.

== Records ==
Current world records held in 10 meter air pistol
Women	Teams	1739	China (Jiang, Wang, Ji)	September 4, 2018	Changwon (KOR)
