= Julia Simon =

Julia Simon may refer to:

- Julia Simon (sport shooter) (born 1991), German sport shooter
- Julia Simon (biathlete) (born 1996), French biathlete
