= Qingqing =

Qingqing is a Chinese given name. Notable people with the given name include:

- Xiaoqing (character), also known as Qingqing, fictional blue-green snake from The Legend of the White Snake
- Wang Qingqing (born 1983), Chinese racewalking athlete
- Wang Qingqing (renju player) (born 1991), Chinese renju player
- Huang Qingqing (born 2003), Chinese sport shooter
