= Saurabh Chaudhary =

Indian sport shooter (born 2002)

Saurabh Chaudhary Siwach
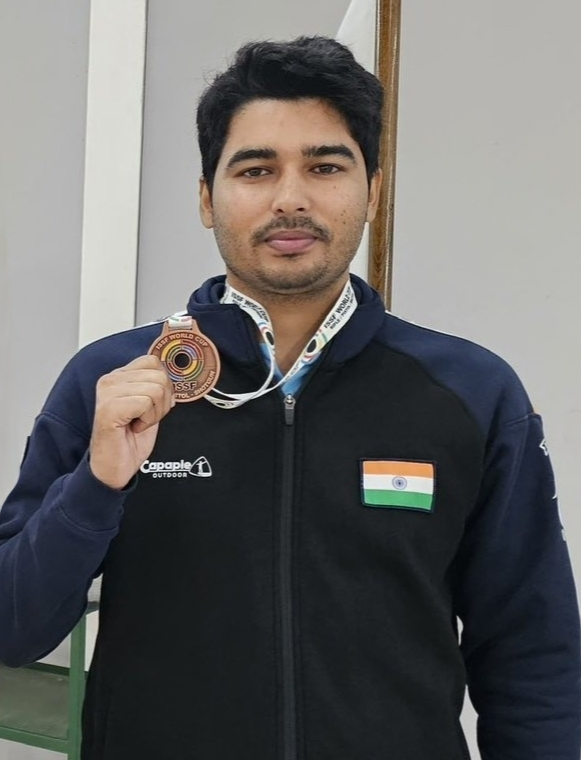
- Chaudhary at the 2025 World Cup

Personal information
- Born: 12 May 2002 (age 24) Kalina, Uttar Pradesh, India
- Height: 1.73 m (5 ft 8 in)

Sport
- Sport: Shooting
- Event: 10 m air pistol

Achievements and titles
- Highest world ranking: 3
- Personal bests: 246.3 WJR (2019); 240.7 AGR (2018); 591 NR (2025)
Medal record
Men's shooting
Representing India
Event	1st	2nd	3rd
World Cup Final	0	1	0
Asian Games	1	0	0
Asian Championships	4	3	2
World Cup	9	2	4
Youth Olympic Games	1	0	0
Junior World Championships	1	0	1
Junior Asian Championships	2	1	0
Junior World Cup	4	0	0
Total	22	7	7
Men's 10 m air pistol
World Cup Final
Silver medal – second place	2019 Putian	Mixed team
Asian Games
Gold medal – first place	2018 Palembang	Individual
Asian Championships
Gold medal – first place	2019 Taoyuan	Mixed team
Gold medal – first place	2019 Taoyuan	Team
Silver medal – second place	2019 Doha	Individual
Silver medal – second place	2019 Doha	Mixed team
Silver medal – second place	2025 Shymkent	Team
Bronze medal – third place	2019 Doha	Team
Bronze medal – third place	2025 Shymkent	Mixed team
World Cup
Gold medal – first place	2019 Munich	Individual
Gold medal – first place	2019 New Delhi	Individual
Gold medal – first place	2019 New Delhi	Mixed team
Gold medal – first place	2019 Beijing	Mixed team
Gold medal – first place	2019 Munich	Mixed team
Gold medal – first place	2021 New Delhi	Mixed team
Gold medal – first place	2021 New Delhi	Team
Gold medal – first place	2022 Cairo	Individual
Gold medal – first place	2025 Lima	Mixed team
Silver medal – second place	2021 Osijek	Mixed team
Silver medal – second place	2021 New Delhi	Individual
Bronze medal – third place	2019 Rio de Janeiro	Individual
Bronze medal – third place	2021 Osijek	Individual
Bronze medal – third place	2025 Lima	Individual
Bronze medal – third place	2025 Buenos Aires	Mixed team
Youth Olympic Games
Gold medal – first place	2018 Buenos Aires	Individual
Junior World Championships
Gold medal – first place	2018 Changwon	Individual
Bronze medal – third place	2018 Changwon	Mixed team
Junior Asian Championships
Gold medal – first place	2017 Wako City	Individual
Gold medal – first place	2018 Kuwait City	Individual
Silver medal – second place	2016 Tehran	Individual
Junior World Cup
Gold medal – first place	2018 Suhl	Individual
Gold medal – first place	2018 Suhl	Mixed team
Gold medal – first place	2022 Suhl	Mixed team
Gold medal – first place	2022 Suhl	Team
Men's 50 m pistol
World Championships
Gold medal – first place	2026 Doha	Team
Asian Championships
Gold medal – first place	2026 New Delhi	Individual
Gold medal – first place	2026 New Delhi	Team

Saurabh Chaudhary Siwach (born 12 May 2002) is an Indian sport shooter who specializes in the 10 m air pistol event. He rose to fame after clinching the gold medal in the 10 m air pistol event at the 2018 Asian Games, becoming the youngest Indian ever to win an Asian Games gold at just 16 years old. He set a world junior record with a score of 246.3 in the 10 m air pistol category in 2019, a record he still holds as of 2025. In recognition of his achievements, he was honored with the Arjuna Award in 2020.

== Early life ==
Chaudhary was born in a Jat family of farmers in Kalina village, Meerut district in Uttar Pradesh. He took up shooting at 13 and practised daily, travelling 15 km each way on buses to his club run.

== Career ==
Months before Tokyo Olympics, Chaudhary was effected by COVID-19. But, Chaudhary fired his way into the finals of the men's 10m air pistol event by topping the qualifications at 1st position with 586/600 with a mind-blowing performance in the Tokyo Olympics here on Saturday. Coach hard work at Aryangateways Sports Foundation for Saurabh proved itself in Olympics. Unfortunately in finals medal slipped off even after the entry at first position.

At the age of 16 years, he won Gold n 10m air pistol at the Youth Olympic Games in Buenos Aires. And shot 244.2 to finish on top ahead of South Korea's Sung Yunho (236.7) and Switzerland's Solari Jason (215.6), who bagged silver and bronze respectively.

=== 2018 ===
Chaudhary became the youngest Indian shooter to win a gold medal at the Asian Games. He participated in the Youth Olympic Games 2018 in Argentina and won gold. He won three golds in the Asian Airgun Championship in 2018:the 10m air pistol competition, the team competition and in the mixed team 10m pistol.

=== 2019 ===
In February he won the gold medal at ISSF World Cup in Delhi.

In April, he participated in Mixed Team 10m pistol with Manu Bhaker and won gold at ISSF World Cup in Beijing.

In May he won gold and broke the world and junior records in 10m pistol ISSF World Cup in Munich.

=== 2020 ===
In January 2020, he won 63rd gold at the 63rd National Shooting Championship.in men's 10 metre air pistol.

=== 2021 ===
In the men's 10 metre air pistol event of the Tokyo Olympics he managed to reach the final finishing in 7th place.

=== 2025 ===
Saurabh returned to shooting in January 2025, setting a national record in 10m men's air pistol shooting with a score of 591, winning the national selection trials.

== Performance record ==
=== Youth Olympic Games ===
Year	Championship	Venue	Event	Rank	Score
2018	Youth Olympic Games	Buenos Aires	10m air pistol	1st place, gold medalist(s)	Score:580, Final:244.2

=== World Championship ===
Year	Championships	Venue	Event	Rank	Note
2017	World Junior Championships	Suhl	10m air pistol	4th	Score:578, Final:198.0
2018	World Junior Championships	Changwon	10m air pistol	1st place, gold medalist(s)	score:581, Final:245.5
2018	World Junior Championships	Changwon	Mixed team 10m air pistol	3rd place, bronze medalist(s)	score:761, Final:407.3

=== Asian Games ===
Year	Championship	Venue	Event	Rank	Score
2018	2018 Asian Games	Palembang	10m air pistol	1st place, gold medalist(s)	score:586, Final:240.7

=== World Cup ===
==== 10m air pistol ====
Year	Championships	Venue	Event	Rank	Score
2021	ISSF World Cup	New Delhi	10m air pistol	2nd	Score:587, Final:243.2
2019 ISSF World Cup	ISSF World Cup	New Delhi	10m air pistol	1st	Score:587, Final:245.0WR
2019 ISSF World Cup	ISSF World Cup	Munich	10m air pistol	1st	score:586, Final:246.3WR Jr. Sr.
2019 ISSF World Cup	ISSF World Cup	Rio de Janeiro	10m air pistol	3rd	score:584, Final:221.9
2019	ISSF World Cup Final	Putian	10m air pistol	6th	Score:581, Final:159.8
2018	Junior World Cup	Suhl	10m air pistol	1st	Score:583, Final:243.7

==== Mixed team ====
Year	Championships	Venue	Event	Rank	Score
2021	ISSF World Cup	New Delhi	Mixed team 10m air pistol	1st place, gold medalist(s)	Score:384, Final:16
2019 ISSF World Cup	ISSF World Cup	New Delhi	Mixed team 10m air pistol	1st place, gold medalist(s)	Score:767, Final:478.9
2019 ISSF World Cup	ISSF World Cup	Beijing	Mixed team 10m air pistol	1st place, gold medalist(s)	Score:482, Final16
2019 ISSF World Cup	ISSF World Cup	Munich	Mixed team 10m air pistol	1st place, gold medalist(s)	score:591, Final:17
2019 ISSF World Cup	ISSF World Cup	Rio de Janeiro	Mixed team 10m air pistol	1st place, gold medalist(s)	Score:-, Final:17
2019	ISSF World Cup Final	Putian	Mixed team 10m air pistol	2nd place, silver medalist(s)	score:389, Final:13
2018	Junior World Cup	Suhl	Mixed team 10m air pistol	1st place, gold medalist(s)	Score:767, Final:478.9

== Honours ==
- The Times of India TOISA Shooter of the Year: 2021

== Gallery ==
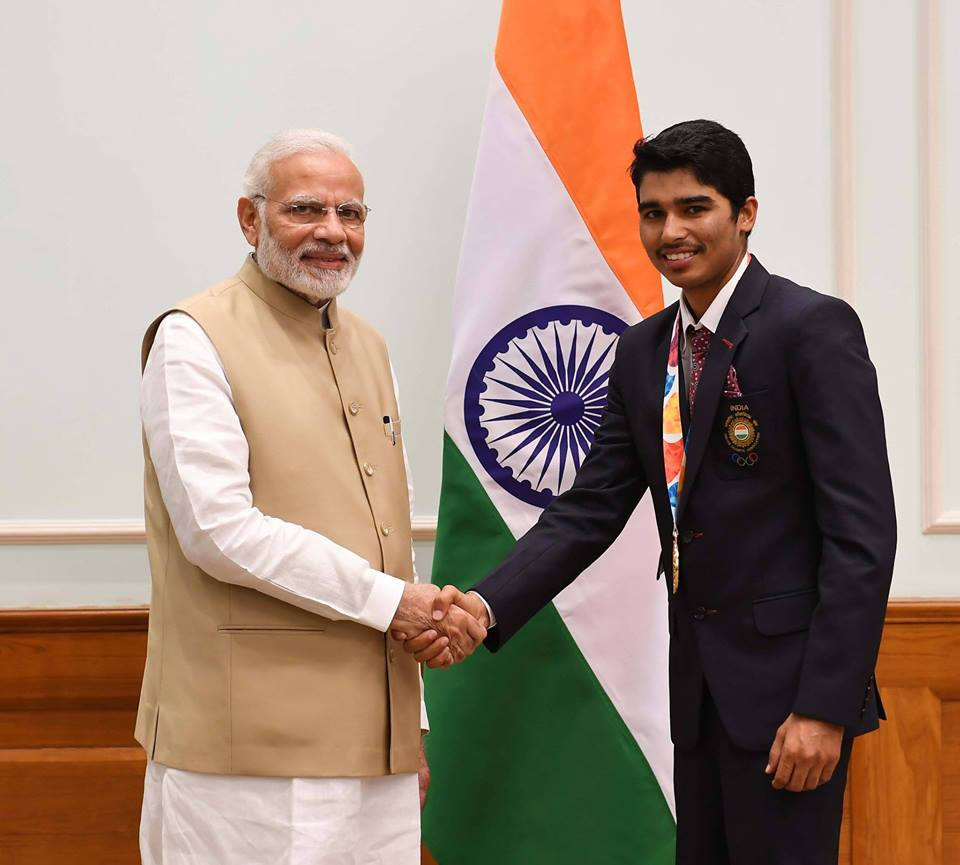
The Prime Minister, Shri Narendra Modi greeted Saurabh Chaudhary as Gold Medalist youth Olympian, in Delhi on 21 October 2018

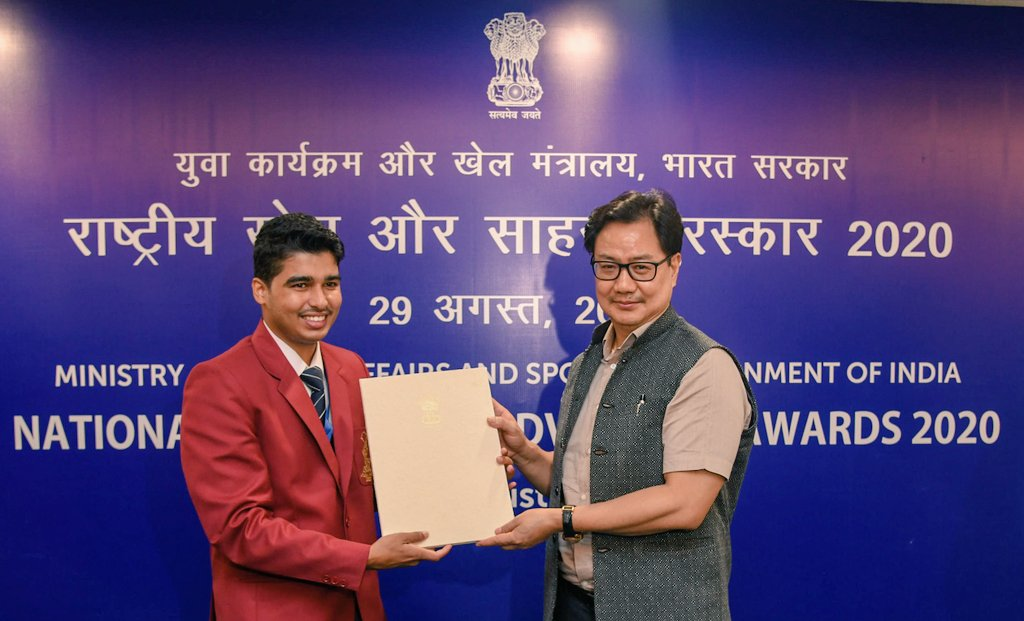
The Ministry of Youth Affairs and Sports, Kiren Rijiju (Minister) presenting the Arjuna Award, 2020 to Saurabh Chaudhary the shooter of Aryangateways Sports Foundation at Rashtrapati Bhavan, in New Delhi on 29 August 2020

== See also ==
- National Rifle Association of India (NRAI)
- International Shooting Sports Federation (ISSF)
- Sports Authoruity of India (SAI)
- Uttar Pradesh State Rifle Association (UPSRA)
