= Abhishek Verma (sport shooter) =

Indian sport shooter (born 1989)

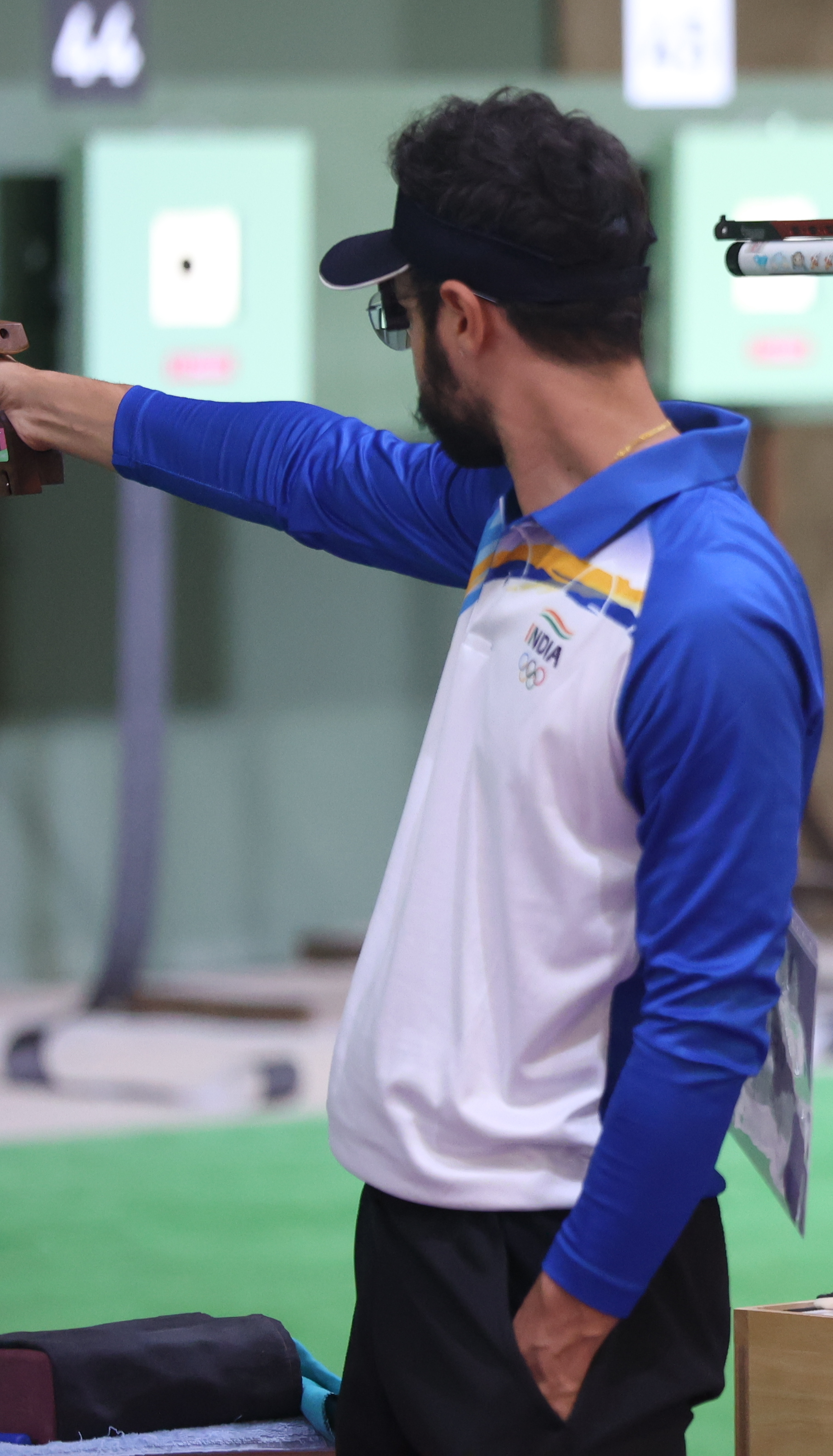
- Verma at the 2020 Tokyo Olympics

Personal information
- Nationality: Indian
- Born: 1 August 1989 (age 36) Panipat, Haryana, India
- Education: • L.L.B. • B. Tech. (Computer Science)
- Height: 1.78 m (5 ft 10 in)
- Parents: Justice Ashok Kumar Verma (father); Kusum Verma (mother)

Sport
- Sport: Shooting
- Event: 10 m air pistol
- Club: Yaduvanshi Shooting Academy Hisar

Achievements and titles
- Highest world ranking: 1
Medal record
Men's 10 m air pistol shooting
Representing India
World Championships
Silver medal – second place	2018 Changwon	Team
World Cup
Gold medal – first place	2019 Beijing	Individual
Gold medal – first place	2019 Rio de Janeiro	Individual
Gold medal – first place	2021 New Delhi	Team
Silver medal – second place	2019 Rio de Janeiro	Mixed Team
Bronze medal – third place	2021 New Delhi	Individual
Bronze medal – third place	2021 New Delhi	Mixed Team
Asian Games
Bronze medal – third place	2018 Palembang	Individual
Asian Championships
Gold medal – first place	2019 Doha	Mixed Team
Gold medal – first place	2019 Taoyuan	Team
Silver medal – second place	2019 Taoyuan	Individual
Bronze medal – third place	2019 Doha	Team

Abhishek Verma (born 1 August 1989) is an Indian sport shooter who specializes in the 10 m air pistol event. Verma has represented India at all major international shooting events, including the World Championships, World Cup, Asian Games, Asian Championships, and the 2020 Tokyo Olympics. In recognition of his achievements, he was honored with the Arjuna Award– India's second-highest sporting distinction, in 2021.
