= Yang Yiyang =

Chinese sport shooter (born 1986)

Personal information
- Nationality: Chinese
- Born: 15 March 1986 (age 40) Luoyang, China
- Height: 1.78 m (5 ft 10 in)
- Weight: 82 kg (181 lb)

Sport
- Country: China
- Sport: Shooting
- Event: Double trap
- Club: He Nan
Medal record
World Championships
Silver medal – second place	2018 Changwon	Double trap
Silver medal – second place	2018 Changwon	Double trap team
Asian Championships
Bronze medal – third place	2013 Almaty	Double trap team

Yang Yiyang (born 15 March 1986) is a Chinese sport shooter.

He participated at the 2018 ISSF World Shooting Championships, winning a medal.
