= 2018 ISSF World Shooting Championships =

Shooting competition

- Location: Changwon, South Korea
- Dates: 2–14 September

The 52nd ISSF World Shooting Championships were held in Changwon, South Korea from 2 to 14 September 2018.

This also served as first qualification for 2020 Summer Olympics.

== Medal summary ==
=== Senior ===
==== Medal table ====
* Host nation (South Korea)

Rank	Nation	Gold	Silver	Bronze	Total
1	China (CHN)	9	9	3	21
2	Russia (RUS)	8	8	10	26
3	South Korea (KOR)*	7	5	8	20
4	Germany (GER)	6	6	3	15
5	Sweden (SWE)	4	2	3	9
6	United States (USA)	3	3	3	9
7	France (FRA)	3	1	2	6
8	Finland (FIN)	3	0	1	4
9	India (IND)	2	4	1	7
10	Italy (ITA)	2	2	3	7
11	Ukraine (UKR)	2	1	4	7
12	Slovakia (SVK)	2	1	2	5
13	Poland (POL)	1	3	0	4
14	Norway (NOR)	1	2	2	5
15	Denmark (DEN)	1	2	0	3
16	Austria (AUT)	1	1	1	3
17	Spain (ESP)	1	1	0	2
18	Great Britain (GBR)	1	0	2	3
19	Kuwait (KUW)	1	0	1	2
20	Brazil (BRA)	1	0	0	1
20	Greece (GRE)	1	0	0	1
20	Slovenia (SLO)	1	0	0	1
23	Serbia (SRB)	0	3	0	3
24	Switzerland (SUI)	0	2	5	7
25	Croatia (CRO)	0	2	3	5
26	North Korea (PRK)	0	2	2	4
27	Hungary (HUN)	0	1	0	1
28	Belarus (BLR)	0	0	1	1
28	Cyprus (CYP)	0	0	1	1
Totals (29 entries)		61	61	61	183

==== Men ====
Event	Gold		Silver		Bronze	
10 m air pistol	Jin Jong-oh; South Korea	241.5; S-off: 10.3	Artem Chernousov; Russia	241.5; S-off: 9.5	Lee Dae-myung; South Korea	220.6
10 m air pistol team	South Korea; Lee Dae-myung; Jin Jong-oh; Han Seung-woo	1747	India; Abhishek Verma; Om Prakash Mitharwal; Shahzar Rizvi	1738	Russia; Artem Chernousov; Denis Koulakov; Anton Gourianov	1736
25 m center fire pistol	Júlio Almeida; Brazil	591	Christian Reitz; Germany	588	Pavlo Korostylov; Ukraine	586
25 m center fire pistol team	South Korea; Kim Young-min; Kim Jin-il; Jang Dae-kyu	1743	France; Clément Bessaguet; Alban Pierson; Boris Artaud	1737	China; Yao Zhaonan; Jin Yongde; Zhao Xiankun	1735
25 m rapid fire pistol	Lin Junmin; China	32	Zhang Jian; China	31	Jean Quiquampoix; France	24
25 m rapid fire pistol team	China; Lin Junmin; Zhang Jian; Yao Zhaonan	1756; WR	Germany; Oliver Geis; Christian Reitz; Christian Freckmann	1751	South Korea; Kim Jun-hong; Song Jong-ho; Park Jun-woo	1745
25 m standard pistol	Pavlo Korostylov; Ukraine	581	Gurpreet Singh; India	579; 22x	Kim Jun-hong; South Korea	579; 19x
25 m standard pistol team	France; Clément Bessaguet; Boris Artaud; Alban Pierson	1716	South Korea; Kim Jun-hong; Kim Young-min; Jang Dae-kyu	1709	Ukraine; Pavlo Korostylov; Volodymyr Pasternak; Oleksandr Petriv	1704
10 m air rifle	Sergey Kamenskiy; Russia	248.4	Petar Gorša; Croatia	247.5	Miran Maričić; Croatia	227.3
10 m air rifle team	China; Yang Haoran; Hui Zicheng; Yu Haonan	1887.4; WR	Russia; Sergey Kamenskiy; Vladimir Maslennikov; Alexander Dryagin	1884.0	South Korea; Nam Tae-yun; Kim Hyeon-jun; Song Soo-joo	1878.5
50 m pistol	Om Prakash Mitharwal; India	564	Damir Mikec; Serbia	562	Lee Dae-myung; South Korea	560
50 m pistol team	South Korea; Lee Dae-myung; Park Dae-hun; Han Seung-woo	1670	Serbia; Damir Mikec; Dusko Petrov; Dimitrije Grgić	1667	China; Wu Jiayu; Pu Qifeng; Zhang Bingchen	1661
50 m rifle prone	Steffen Olsen; Denmark	628.2	Stian Bogar; Norway	627.8	Thomas Mathis; Austria	627.1
50 m rifle prone team	Germany; Daniel Brodmeier; Christoph Kaulich; Maximilian Dallinger	1869.5	United States; Matthew Emmons; Lucas Kozeniesky; Michael McPhail	1868.0	China; Zhao Zhonghao; Sun Jian; Liu Gang	1866.8
50 m rifle 3 positions	Tomasz Bartnik; Poland	460.4	Petar Gorša; Croatia	457.4	Michael McPhail; United States	446.9
50 m rifle 3 positions team	Russia; Nazar Louginets; Vladimir Maslennikov; Sergey Kamenskiy	3535; WR	China; Yang Haoran; Hui Zicheng; Yao Yuncong	3532	Belarus; Yury Shcherbatsevich; Vitali Bubnovich; Illia Charheika	3526
300 m standard rifle	Aleksi Leppa; Finland	580	Karl Olsson; Sweden	576; 21x	Odd Arne Brekne; Norway	576; 13x
300 m standard rifle team	Norway; Odd Arne Brekne; Kim Andre Lund; Ole-Kristian Bryhn	1722	South Korea; Choi Young-jeon; Lee Won-gyu; Cheon Min-ho	1711	Switzerland; Jan Lochbihler; Gilles Dufaux; Andrea Rossi	1708
300 m rifle prone	Rajmond Debevec; Slovenia	592; 31x	Daniel Romańczyk; Poland	592; 22x	Josip Kuna; Croatia	590
300 m rifle prone team	France; Remi Moreno Flores; Valérian Sauveplane; Michael d'Halluin	1761	Switzerland; Gilles Dufaux; Jan Lochbihler; Marcel Ackermann	1757	Norway; Ole-Kristian Bryhn; Stian Bogar; Odd Arne Brekne	1755
300 m rifle 3 positions	Aleksi Leppa; Finland	1172	István Péni; Hungary	1169	Gilles Dufaux; Switzerland	1167
300 m rifle 3 positions team	Austria; Gernot Rumpler; Bernhard Pickl; Stefan Rumpler	3469	Switzerland; Gilles Dufaux; Jan Lochbihler; Andrea Rossi	3461	France; Alexis Raynaud; Michael d'Halluin; Valérian Sauveplane	3459
10 m running target	Jesper Nyberg; Sweden	6	Maxim Stepanov; Russia	3	Vladislav Prianishnikov; Russia	6
10 m running target team	Russia; Vladislav Prianishnikov; Maxim Stepanov; Vladislav Shchepotkin	1734	North Korea; Pak Myong-won; Kwon Kwang-il; Jo Yong-chol	1722	Sweden; Jesper Nyberg; Emil Martinsson; Niklas Bergström	1718
10 m running target mixed	Tomi-Pekka Heikkila; Finland	388	Łukasz Czapla; Poland	386	Mikhail Azarenko; Russia	385
10 m running target mixed team	Sweden; Jesper Nyberg; Niklas Bergström; Emil Martinsson	1147	Russia; Mikhail Azarenko; Maxim Stepanov; Vladislav Prianishnikov	1137	North Korea; Kwon Kwang-il; Jo Yong-chol; Pak Myong-won	1135
50 m running target	Mikhail Azarenko; Russia	589; S-off: 20	Łukasz Czapla; Poland	589; S-off: 19	Tomi-Pekka Heikkila; Finland	587
50 m running target team	Russia; Mikhail Azarenko; Dmitry Romanov; Maxim Stepanov	1759	Sweden; Emil Martinsson; Jesper Nyberg; Niklas Bergström	1756	South Korea; Ha Kwang-chul; Cho Se-jong; Jeong You-jin	1738
50 m running target mixed	Emil Martinsson; Sweden	393	Mikhail Azarenko; Russia	392	Jesper Nyberg; Sweden	391
50 m running target mixed team	Sweden; Emil Martinsson; Jesper Nyberg; Niklas Bergström	1171	Russia; Mikhail Azarenko; Dmitry Romanov; Maxim Stepanov	1170	North Korea; Pak Myong-won; Jo Yong-chol; Kwon Kwang-il	1163
Skeet	Vincent Hancock; United States	59; EWR	Erik Watndal; Norway	55	Riccardo Filippelli; Italy	46
Skeet team	France; Emmanuel Petit; Éric Delaunay; Anthony Terras	365	Italy; Riccardo Filippelli; Gabriele Rossetti; Tammaro Cassandro	363	Russia; Anton Astakhov; Alexander Zemlin; Yaroslav Startsev	361
Trap	Alberto Fernández; Spain	48	Erik Varga; Slovakia	47	Abdulrahman Al-Faihan; Kuwait	32
Trap team	Kuwait; Abdulrahman Al-Faihan; Talal Al-Rashidi; Khaled Al-Mudhaf	360	United States; Glenn Eller; Grayson Davey; Casey Wallace	360	Italy; Mauro De Filippis; Giovanni Pellielo; Valerio Grazini	360
Double trap	Ankur Mittal; India	140 (+4)	Yang Yiyang; China	140 (+3)	Hubert Olejnik; Slovakia	140 (+1)
Double trap team	Italy; Andrea Vescovi; Daniele Di Spigino; Marco Innocenti	411	China; Yang Yiyang; Liu Anlong; Qi Ying	410	India; Ankur Mittal; Asab Mohd; Shardul Vihan	409

==== Women ====
Event	Gold		Silver		Bronze	
10 m air pistol	Anna Korakaki; Greece	241.1	Zorana Arunović; Serbia	239.8	Kim Bo-mi; South Korea	218.8
10 m air pistol team	China; Jiang Ranxin; Wang Qian; Ji Xiaojing	1739; WR	South Korea; Kim Min-jung; Kim Bo-mi; Kwak Jung-hye	1734	Russia; Vitalina Batsarashkina; Margarita Lomova; Svetlana Medvedeva	1720
25 m pistol	Olena Kostevych; Ukraine	37; S-off: 4+4+3	Vitalina Batsarashkina; Russia	37; S-off: 4+4+2	Doreen Vennekamp; Germany	31
25 m pistol team	China; Jiang Ranxin; Lin Yuemei; Yao Yushi	1746	South Korea; Lee Jung-eun; Kim Min-jung; Kwak Jung-hye	1746	Germany; Monika Karsch; Doreen Vennekamp; Michelle Skeries	1744
10 m air rifle	Im Ha-na; South Korea	251.1	Anjum Moudgil; India	248.4	Jung Eun-hea; South Korea	228.0
10 m air rifle team	South Korea; Im Ha-na; Jung Eun-hea; Keum Ji-hyeon	1886.2; WR	India; Anjum Moudgil; Apurvi Chandela; Mehuli Ghosh	1879.0	Germany; Isabella Straub; Selina Gschwandtner; Julia Simon	1878.4
50 m rifle prone	Seonaid McIntosh; Great Britain	623.9	Isabella Straub; Germany	623.7	Daniela Pešková; Slovakia	623.3
50 m rifle prone team	Germany; Isabella Straub; Amelie Kleinmanns; Jaqueline Orth	1871.4; WR	Denmark; Stine Nielsen; Rikke Ibsen; Stephanie Grundsoee	1851.2	Great Britain; Seonaid McIntosh; Jennifer McIntosh; Zoe Bruce	1850.6
50 m rifle 3 positions	Yulia Karimova; Russia	461.1	Isabella Straub; Germany	459.5	Snježana Pejčić; Croatia	446.4
50 m rifle 3 positions team	Germany; Isabella Straub; Jolyn Beer; Jaqueline Orth	3521; WR	Denmark; Rikke Ibsen; Stine Nielsen; Stephanie Grundsoee	3518	Russia; Yulia Karimova; Polina Khorosheva; Yulia Zykova	3510
300 m rifle prone	Bae So-hee; South Korea	592	Eva Rösken; Germany	588	Silvia Guignard; Switzerland	586
300 m rifle prone team	Germany; Eva Rösken; Lisa Müller; Jolyn Beer	1748	South Korea; Bae So-hee; Eum Bit-na; Bae Sang-hee	1737; 67x	Switzerland; Silvia Guignard; Andrea Brühlmann; Marina Schnider	1737; 60x
300 m rifle 3 positions	Lisa Müller; Germany	1161; 37x WR	Jolyn Beer; Germany	1161; 31x WR	Elin Ahlin; Sweden	1159
300 m rifle 3 positions team	Germany; Lisa Müller; Jolyn Beer; Eva Rösken	3469; WR	Austria; Franziska Peer; Olivia Hofmann; Nadine Ungerank	3436	Switzerland; Silvia Guignard; Marina Schnider; Andrea Brühlmann	3429
10 m running target	Olga Stepanova; Russia	7	Li Xue Yan; China	5	Halyna Avramenko; Ukraine	6
10 m running target team	China; Li Xue Yan; Su Li; Huang Qingqing	1673; WR	North Korea; Ri Ji-ye; Han Chol-sim; Paek Ok-sim	1672	Russia; Olga Stepanova; Irina Izmalkova; Julia Eydenzon	1668
10 m running target mixed	Su Li; China	391	Li Xue Yan; China	382	Irina Izmalkova; Russia	375
10 m running target mixed team	China; Su Li; Li Xue Yan; Huang Qingqing	1125	Ukraine; Viktoriya Rybovalova; Halyna Avramenko; Valentyna Goncharova	1101	Russia; Irina Izmalkova; Olga Stepanova; Julia Eydenzon	1097
Skeet	Caitlin Connor; United States	57	Kim Rhode; United States	56	Amber English; United States	46
Skeet team	United States; Amber English; Kim Rhode; Caitlin Connor	355; WR	Italy; Katiuscia Spada; Diana Bacosi; Chiara Cainero	347	Cyprus; Andri Eleftheriou; Konstantia Nikolaou; Panayiota Andreou	345
Trap	Zuzana Štefečeková; Slovakia	45; S-off: 3	Wang Xiaojing; China	45; S-off: 2	Silvana Stanco; Italy	36
Trap team	Italy; Silvana Stanco; Jessica Rossi; Alessia Iezzi	343; WR	Spain; Beatriz Martínez; Fátima Gálvez; Francisca Muñoz	342	United States; Kayle Browning; Ashley Carroll; Aeriel Skinner	339

==== Mixed ====
Event	Gold		Silver		Bronze	
10 m air rifle	China; Zhao Ruozhu; Yang Haoran	500.9	China; Wu Mingyang; Song Buhan	500.6	Russia; Anastasiia Galashina; Vladimir Maslennikov	434.2
10 m air pistol	Russia; Vitalina Batsarashkina; Artem Chernousov	488.1	China; Wang Qian; Wang Mengyi	480.2	Ukraine; Olena Kostevych; Oleh Omelchuk	416.7
Trap	Slovakia; Zuzana Štefečeková; Erik Varga	45	Russia; Ekaterina Rabaya; Aleksey Alipov	40	Great Britain; Kirsty Barr; Aaron Heading	33

=== Junior ===
Due to shortage of athletes some events are conducted as "Grand Prix" only.

- Double Trap Men Junior - Individual and Team
- 10m Running Target Men Junior Team
- 10m Running Target Mixed Men Junior Team
- 50m Running Target Men Junior Team
- 50m Running Target Mixed Men Junior Team
- 10m Running Target Women Junior - Individual and Team
- 10m Running Target Mixed Women Junior - Individual and Team

This events not computed at the medal table and marked with blue.

==== Medal table ====
Rank	Nation	Gold	Silver	Bronze	Total
1	China (CHN)	11	6	5	22
2	India (IND)	9	5	6	20
3	Italy (ITA)	5	1	3	9
4	South Korea (KOR)	4	9	3	16
5	Norway (NOR)	2	0	1	3
6	Australia (AUS)	2	0	0	2
7	Ukraine (UKR)	1	3	1	5
8	Iran (IRN)	1	3	0	4
9	Austria (AUT)	1	2	0	3
10	Russia (RUS)	1	1	9	11
11	France (FRA)	1	1	0	2
11	Germany (GER)	1	1	0	2
13	Czech Republic (CZE)	1	0	2	3
14	Turkey (TUR)	1	0	0	1
15	United States (USA)	0	6	4	10
16	Hungary (HUN)	0	2	2	4
17	Mongolia (MGL)	0	1	0	1
18	Poland (POL)	0	0	2	2
19	Georgia (GEO)	0	0	1	1
19	Kazakhstan (KAZ)	0	0	1	1
19	Sweden (SWE)	0	0	1	1
Totals (21 entries)		41	41	41	123

==== Men ====
Event	Gold		Silver		Bronze	
10 m air pistol	Saurabh Chaudhary; India	245.5; WRJ	Lim Ho-jin; South Korea	243.1	Arjun Singh Cheema; India	218.0
10 m air pistol team	South Korea; Lim Ho-jin; Sung Yun-ho; Shin Ok-cheol	1732	India; Saurabh Chaudhary; Arjun Singh Cheema; Anmol Anmol	1730	Russia; Alexander Petrov; Aleksandr Kondrashin; Anton Aristakhov	1711
25 m pistol	Udhayveer Sidhu; India	587	Henry Leverett; United States	584	Lee Jae-kyoon; South Korea	582
25 m pistol team	India; Udhayveer Sidhu; Vijayveer Sidhu; Rajkanwar Singh Sandhu	1736	China; Cheng Zhipeng; Pan Junchen; Zhu Haojie	1730	South Korea; Lee Jae-kyoon; Youn Jae-yeon; Shin Hyeon-jin	1721
25 m rapid fire pistol	Zhu Haojie; China	35; WRJ	Lee Jae-kyoon; South Korea	29	Cheng Zhipeng; China	24
25 m rapid fire pistol team	China; Zhu Haojie; Cheng Zhipeng; Pan Junchen	1747; WRJ	South Korea; Lee Gun-hyeok; Lee Jae-kyoon; Baek Jong-bin	1719	Poland; Patryk Sakowski; Tomasz Piwowarski; Kacper Jurasz	1706
25 m standard pistol	Sidhu Vijayveer; India	572	Lee Gun-hyeok; South Korea	570	Zhu Haojie; China	565
25 m standard pistol team	India; Vijayveer Sidhu; Rajkanwar Singh Sandhu; Adarsh Singh	1695	South Korea; Lee Gun-hyeok; Youn Jae-yeon; Shin Hyeon-jin	1693	Czech Republic; Matej Rampula; Antonin Tupý; Lukas Skoumal	1674
10 m air rifle	Hriday Hazarika; India	250.1; S-off:10.3	Amir Mohammad Nekounam; Iran	250.1; S-off:10.2	Grigorii Shamakov; Russia	228.6
10 m air rifle team	China; Tian Xiangyu; Wang Yuefeng; Wang Peng	1876.2; WRJ	Iran; Amir Siavash Zolfagharian; Amir Mohammad Nekounam; Mohammad Hossein Sharifzadeh	1874.3	Russia; Ilia Marsov; Grigorii Shamakov; Denis Goncharenko	1873.7
50 m pistol	Arjun Singh Cheema; India	559	Kim Woo-jong; South Korea	554	Gaurav Rana; India	551
50 m pistol team	India; Arjun Singh Cheema; Gaurav Rana; Anmol Anmol	1659	South Korea; Kim Woo-jong; Sung Yun-ho; Jeong Ho-young	1640	China; Xie Yu; Hong Shuqi; Hu Pengqi	1627
50 m rifle prone	Benjamin Tingsrud Karlsen; Norway	619.7	Zalan Pekler; Hungary	619.1	William Shaner; United States	618.2
50 m rifle prone team	Norway; Benjamin Tingsrud Karlsen; Vegard Nordhagen; Jon-Hermann Hegg	1852.5	Austria; Stefan Wadlegger; Patrick Diem; Andreas Thum	1846.1	Russia; Artem Filippov; Grigorii Shamakov; Oleg Senchenkov	1845.6
50 m rifle 3 positions	Amir Mohammad Nekounam; Iran	455.5	Zalan Pekler; Hungary	455.0	Cao Bo; China	442.9
50 m rifle 3 positions team	China; Cao Bo; Ding Fanglong; Zhang Changhong	3467	Russia; Artem Filippov; Grigorii Shamakov; Oleg Senchenkov	3455	Hungary; Zalan Pekler; Peter Vas; Patrik Pragai	3452
10 m running target	Kris Grossheim; Germany	7	Danylo Danilenko; Ukraine	5	Maksym Babushok; Ukraine	6
10 m running target team	Ukraine; Danylo Danilenko; Maksym Babushok; Denys Babliuk	1695	Russia; Egor Spekhov; Ian Eidenzon; Aleksandr Beltiukov	1575		
10 m running target mixed	Egor Spekhov; Russia	378	Danylo Danilenko; Ukraine	375	Andrey Khudyakov; Kazakhstan	374
10 m running target mixed team	Ukraine; Danylo Danilenko; Maksym Babushok; Denys Babliuk	1120	Russia; Egor Spekhov; Ian Eidenzon; Aleksandr Beltiukov	1060		
50 m running target	Nicolas Tranchant; France	579	Danylo Danilenko; Ukraine	574	Espen Teppdalen Nordsveen; Norway	572
50 m running target team	Ukraine; Danylo Danilenko; Maksym Babushok; Denys Babliuk	1708	Russia; Egor Spekhov; Ian Eidenzon; Aleksandr Beltiukov	1678		
50 m running target mixed	Danylo Danilenko; Ukraine	386; S-off: 20	Kris Grossheim; Germany	386; S-off: 19 20	Andreas Bergström; Sweden	386; S-off: 19 18
50 m running target mixed team	Ukraine; Danylo Danilenko; Maksym Babushok; Denys Babliuk	1130	Russia; Egor Spekhov; Aleksandr Beltiukov; Ian Eidenzon	1071		
Skeet	Elia Sdruccioli; Italy	55	Nic Moschetti; United States	54	Gurnihal Singh Garcha; India	46
Skeet team	Czech Republic; Daniel Korcak; Jaroslav Lang; Richard Klika	356	India; Gurnihal Singh Garcha; Ayush Rudraraju; Anant Jeet Singh Naruka	355	Italy; Elia Sdruccioli; Niccolo Sodi; Matteo Chiti	354
Trap	Nathan Argiro; Australia	42	Logan Joseph Lucas; United States	41	Lorenzo Ferrari; Italy	31
Trap team	Australia; Nathan Steven Argiro; Mitchell Iles-Crevatin; Adam Joshua Bylsma	348	India; Ali Aman Elahi; Vivaan Kapoor; Manavaditya Singh Rathore	348	Italy; Lorenzo Ferrari; Matteo Marongiu; Teo Petroni	346
Double trap	Ahvar Rizvi; India	141	Marco Carli; Italy	135	Shapath Bharadwaj; India	133
Double trap team	India; Ahvar Rizvi; Shapath Bharadwaj; Lakshjeet Singh Sindhu	400	Italy; Marco Carli; Eraldo Apolloni; Jacopo Dupre de Foresta	390		

==== Women ====
Event	Gold		Silver		Bronze	
10 m air pistol	Sevval Ilayda Tarhan; Turkey	237.9	Choo Gae-un; South Korea	234.5	Lizi Kiladze; Georgia	213.6
10 m air pistol team	South Korea; Yoo Hyun-young; Choo Ga-eun; Kim Hee-sun	1700	Mongolia; Urtnasan Khishigt; Tumenkhuslen Purevdorj; Buyandelger Altankhuyag	1698	Russia; Iana Enina; Nadezhda Koloda; Olga Veretelnikova	1693
25 m pistol	Wang Xiaoyu; China	37	Katelyn Morgan Abeln; United States	27	Anna Dedova; Czech Republic	25
25 m pistol team	South Korea; Min Jeoung-min; Baek Gyun-am; Kim Hee-sun	1723	China; Wang Xiaoyu; Zhou Ying; Chen Lin	1717	Hungary; Viktória Egri; Krisztina Komáromi; Sára Fábián	1714
10 m air rifle	Shi Mengyao; China	250.5	Elavenil Valarivan; India	249.8	Shreya Agrawal; India	228.4
10 m air rifle team	India; Elavenil Valarivan; Shreya Agrawal; Manini Kaushik	1880.7; WRJ	China; Shi Mengyao; Wang Shuyi; Zhang Qiaoying	1874.6	South Korea; Kim Ji-yeon; Han Gae-ul; Oh Min-jung	1871.9
50 m rifle prone	Zhang Qiaoying; China	622.2	Rebecca Koeck; Austria	619.5	Aleksandra Szutko; Poland	619.3
50 m rifle prone team	Austria; Rebecca Koeck; Sheileen Waibel; Verena Zaisberger	1855.0	China; Zhang Qiaoying; Xu Hong; Chen Fanghui	1847.0	United States; Morgan Phillips; Katie Zaun; Elizabeth Marsh	1846.3
50 m rifle 3 positions	Xu Hong; China	456.6	Jade Bordet; France	455.5	Maria Ivanova; Russia	443.2
50 m rifle 3 positions team	China; Xu Hong; Zhang Qiaoying; Chen Fanghui	3474	United States; Morgan Phillips; Elizabeth Marsh; Kristen Hemphill	3461	Russia; Maria Ivanova; Veronika Pavlova; Tatiana Kharkova	3458
10 m running target	Cai Yanxian; China	6	Kseniia Anufrieva; Russia	2	Anna Kostina; Russia	6
10 m running target Team	Russia; Anna Kostina; Kseniia Anufrieva; Tatiana Boltaeva	1604	Armenia; Gohar Vardanyan; Arusyak Grigoryan; Satenik Mezhlumyan	1594		
10 m running target mixed	Anna Kostina; Russia	371	Gohar Vardanyan; Armenia	362	Cai Yanxian; China	359
10 m running target mixed Team	Russia; Anna Kostina; Kseniia Anufrieva; Tatiana Boltaeva	1058	Armenia; Gohar Vardanyan; Arusyak Grigoryan; Satenik Mezhlumyan	1045		
Skeet	Che Yufei; China	53; WRJ	Song Zhengyi; China	51	Austen Jewell Smith; United States	43
Skeet team	China; Che Yufei; Song Zhengyi; Sun Yashu	349; WRJ	United States; Samantha Simonton; Austen Jewell Smith; Katharina Monika Jacob	345	Russia; Elizaveta Evgrafova; Zilia Batyrshina; Anna Zhadnova	334
Trap	Erica Sessa; Italy	41; S-off: 1 EWRJ	Manisha Keer; India	41; S-off: 0 EWRJ	Daria Semianova; Russia	31
Trap team	Italy; Maria Lucia Palmitessa; Erica Sessa; Sofia Littame	352; WRJ	China; Zhang Ting; Duan Yuwei; Gao Wendi	327	United States; Emma Lee Williams; Carey Jeana Garrison; Madelynn Ann Bernau	326

==== Mixed ====
Event	Gold		Silver		Bronze	
10 m air rifle	Italy 1 Sofia Benetti; Marco Suppini	499.0; WRJ	Iran 1 Armina Sadeghian; Amir Mohammad Nekounam	497.7	India 2 Shreya Agrawal; Divyansh Singh Panwar	435.0
10 m air pistol	South Korea 1 Choo Gae-un; Sung Yun-ho	483.0	South Korea 2 Yoo Hyun-young; Lim Ho-jin	473.1	India 1 Abhidnya Ashok Patil; Saurabh Chaudhary	407.3
Trap	Italy 2 Erica Sessa; Lorenzo Ferrari	42; WRJ	Italy 1 Maria Lucia Palmitessa; Matteo Marongiu	34	China 2 Gao Wendi; Ouyang Yiliu	29
