= Bae So-hee =

South Korean sport shooter

Personal information
- Nationality: South Korean
- Born: 29 October 1993 (age 32)

Sport
- Country: South Korea
- Sport: Shooting
- Event: Air rifle
Medal record
World Championships
| Gold medal – first place | 2018 Changwon | 300 m rifle prone |
| Silver medal – second place | 2018 Changwon | 300 m team rifle prone |

Bae So-hee (born 29 October 1993) is a South Korean sport shooter.

She participated at the 2018 ISSF World Shooting Championships, winning a medal.
