= Josip Kuna =

Croatian sport shooter

Personal information
- Nationality: Croatian
- Born: 13 March 1972 (age 54) Osijek, Croatia
- Height: 1.84 m (6 ft 0 in)
- Weight: 105 kg (231 lb)

Sport
- Country: Croatia
- Sport: Shooting
- Event: Air rifle
- Club: GSD Osijek 1784
Medal record
World Championships
Bronze medal – third place	2018 Changwon	300 m rifle prone

Josip Kuna (born 13 March 1972) is a Croatian sport shooter.

He participated at the 2018 ISSF World Shooting Championships, winning a medal.
