= Yao Yuncong =

Chinese sport shooter (born 1995)

Personal information
- Nationality: Chinese
- Born: 19 June 1995 (age 31) Sichuan, China
- Height: 1.78 m (5 ft 10 in)
- Weight: 73 kg (161 lb)

Sport
- Country: China
- Sport: Shooting
- Event: Air rifle
Medal record
World Championships
Silver medal – second place	2018 Changwon	50 m team rifle 3 positions
Asian Championships
Gold medal – first place	2019 Doha	50 m rifle 3 positions team

Yao Yuncong (born 19 June 1995) is a Chinese sport shooter.

He participated at the 2018 ISSF World Shooting Championships, winning a medal.
