= Yaroslav Startsev =

Russian sport shooter (born 1988)

Personal information
- Nationality: Russian
- Born: 20 November 1988 (age 37)

Sport
- Country: Russia
- Sport: Shooting
- Event: Skeet
Medal record
World Championships
Bronze medal – third place	2018 Changwon	Skeet team

Yaroslav Startsev (born 20 November 1988) is a Russian sport shooter.

He participated at the 2018 ISSF World Shooting Championships, winning a medal.
