= Amanpreet Singh =

Indian sport shooter (born 1987)

Personal information
- Born: 28 December 1987 (age 38) Phillaur, Punjab, India
- Height: 1.8 m (5 ft 11 in)

Sport
- Sport: Shooting
- Events: 50 m pistol 25 m standard pistol 10 m air pistol
Medal record
Men's shooting
Representing India
World Championships
Gold medal – first place	2023 Baku	25 m standard pistol
Gold medal – first place	2026 Doha	50 m pistol team
Bronze medal – third place	2026 Doha	25 m centre fire pistol team
World Cup Final
Bronze medal – third place	2017 New Delhi	50 m pistol
World Cup
Silver medal – second place	2017 New Delhi	50 m pistol
Commonwealth Championships
Silver medal – second place	2017 Brisbane	50 m pistol
Asian Championships
Gold medal – first place	2025 Shymkent	25 m standard pistol team
Gold medal – first place	2026 New Delhi	25 m standard pistol team
Silver medal – second place	2025 Shymkent	25 m standard pistol
Silver medal – second place	2025 Shymkent	50 m pistol team
Bronze medal – third place	2026 New Delhi	25 m standard pistol
Junior Asian Championships
Silver medal – second place	2007 Kuwait City	10 m air pistol

Amanpreet Singh (born 28 December 1987) is an Indian sport shooter who competes in pistol events.
