= Andrea Rossi (sport shooter) =

Swiss sport shooter

Personal information
- Nationality: Swiss
- Born: 5 March 1991 (age 35)

Sport
- Country: Switzerland
- Sport: Shooting
- Event: Air rifle
- Club: Sportschützen Gossau
Medal record
World Championships
Silver medal – second place	2018 Changwon	300 m team rifle 3 positions
Bronze medal – third place	2018 Changwon	300 m team standard rifle

Andrea Rossi (born 5 March 1991) is a Swiss sport shooter.

He participated at the 2018 ISSF World Shooting Championships, winning a medal.
