= Isabella Straub =

German sport shooter (born 1991)

Personal information
- Nationality: German
- Born: 14 August 1991 (age 34) Ebersberg, Germany
- Height: 1.60 m (5 ft 3 in)

Sport
- Country: Germany
- Sport: Shooting
- Event: Air rifle
- Club: SG Edelweiß Kirchseeon
Medal record
World Championships
Gold medal – first place	2018 Changwon	50 m team rifle prone
Gold medal – first place	2018 Changwon	50 m team rifle 3 positions
Silver medal – second place	2018 Changwon	50 m rifle 3 positions
Silver medal – second place	2018 Changwon	50 m rifle prone
Bronze medal – third place	2018 Changwon	10 m team air rifle

Isabella Straub (born 14 August 1991) is a German sport shooter.

She participated at the 2018 ISSF World Shooting Championships.
