= Marcel Ackermann =

Swiss sport shooter

Personal information
- Nationality: Switzerland
- Born: 31 July 1974 (age 51) Olten, Switzerland
- Height: 1.94 m (6 ft 4 in)
- Weight: 100 kg (220 lb)

Sport
- Country: Switzerland
- Sport: Shooting
- Event: Air rifle
- Club: SpS Gossan
Medal record
World Championships
Silver medal – second place	2018 Changwon	300 m team rifle prone

Marcel Ackermann (born 31 July 1974) is a Swiss sport shooter.

He participated at the 2018 ISSF World Shooting Championships, winning a silver medal.
