= Francisca Muñoz =

Spanish sport shooter

Personal information
- Full name: Francisca Muñoz de León Moral
- Nationality: Spanish
- Born: 30 December 1993 (age 32)

Sport
- Country: Spain
- Sport: Shooting
- Event: Trap
Medal record
World Championships
Silver medal – second place	2018 Changwon	Trap team

Francisca Muñoz de León Moral (born 30 December 1993) is a Spanish sport shooter.

She participated at the 2018 ISSF World Shooting Championships, winning a medal.
