= Table tennis at the 2019 European Games – Men's team =

Table tennis – Men's team at the 2019 European Games
- Venue: Tennis Olympic Centre
- Date: 27–29 June 2019
- Competitors: 36 from 12 nations

Medalists
gold medal	Dimitrij Ovtcharov; Patrick Franziska; Timo Boll	Germany
silver medal	Jon Persson; Kristian Karlsson; Mattias Falck	Sweden
bronze medal	João Monteiro; Marcos Freitas; Tiago Apolónia	Portugal

The men's team competition in table tennis at the 2019 European Games in Minsk is the second edition of the event in a European Games. It was held at Tennis Olympic Centre from 27 June to 29 June 2019.

== Schedule ==
All times are FET (UTC+03:00)

Date	Time	Event
Thursday, 27 June 2019	13:00	First round
Thursday, 27 June 2019	19:00	Quarterfinals
Friday, 28 June 2019	16:00	Semifinals
Saturday, 29 June 2019	17:00	Bronze medal match
Saturday, 29 June 2019	20:00	Gold medal match

== Seeds ==
The seeding lists were announced on 8 June 2019.

1. Germany (GER)
2. Sweden (SWE)
3. Austria (AUT)
4. Great Britain (GBR)
5. France (FRA)
6. Slovenia (SLO)
7. Croatia (CRO)
8. Belarus (BLR)
9. Portugal (POR)
10. Belgium (BEL)
11. Romania (ROU)
12. Denmark (DEN)

== Result ==
First round
11	Romania	3
8	Belarus	2
5	France	1
9	Portugal	3
12	Denmark	3
6	Slovenia	2
7	Croatia	3
10	Belgium	1

Quarterfinals
1	Germany	3
11	Romania	0
9	Portugal	3
4	Great Britain	1
3	Austria	1
12	Denmark	3
7	Croatia	2
2	Sweden	3

Semifinals
1	Germany	3
9	Portugal	0
12	Denmark	1
2	Sweden	3

Gold Medal Match
1	Germany	3
2	Sweden	0
Bronze Medal Match
9	Portugal	3
12	Denmark	1

=== First round ===
27 June 2019	Romania	3 – 2	Belarus

Cristian Pletea / Hunor Szőcs	3–0	Aliaksandr Khanin / Pavel Platonov	13–11, 11–5, 11–9
Ovidiu Ionescu	3–2	Vladimir Samsonov	11–9, 7–11, 11–9, 6–11, 11–8
Hunor Szőcs	1–3	Pavel Platonov	6–11, 8–11, 11–5, 9–11
Cristian Pletea	1–3	Vladimir Samsonov	6–11, 13–15, 11–5, 6–11
Ovidiu Ionescu	3–1	Aliaksandr Khanin	11–3, 11–9, 9–11, 11–7

27 June 2019	France	1 – 3	Portugal

Can Akkuzu / Emmanuel Lebesson	2–3	Tiago Apolónia / João Monteiro	11–7, 11–6, 5–11, 13–15, 8–11
Simon Gauzy	1–3	Marcos Freitas	7–11, 11–8, 6–11, 7–11
Emmanuel Lebesson	3–2	João Monteiro	6–11, 11–6, 12–10, 9–11, 11–9
Can Akkuzu	1–3	Marcos Freitas	1–11, 11–9, 5–11, 3–11

27 June 2019	Denmark	3 – 2	Slovenia

Tobias Rasmussen / Anders Lind	2–3	Deni Kožul / Darko Jorgić	11–6, 7–11, 11–8, 5–11, 9–11
Jonathan Groth	3–1	Bojan Tokič	11–9, 11–6, 7–11, 11–8
Anders Lind	3–0	Darko Jorgić	11–8, 11–6, 11–9
Tobias Rasmussen	0–3	Bojan Tokič	8–11, 7–11, 9–11
Jonathan Groth	3–1	Deni Kožul	11–5, 7–11, 11–8, 11–5

27 June 2019	Croatia	3 – 1	Belgium

Frane Kojić / Andrej Gaćina	3–1	Robin Devos / Florent Lambiet	7–11, 11–5, 11–6, 11–9
Tomislav Pucar	2–3	Cedric Nuytinck	11–7, 7–11, 11–6, 3–11, 9–11
Andrej Gaćina	3–0	Florent Lambiet	11–8, 11–8, 11–8
Tomislav Pucar	3–1	Robin Devos	12–10, 11–9, 5–11, 11–7

=== Quarterfinals ===
27 June 2019	Germany	3 – 0	Romania

Timo Boll / Patrick Franziska	3–0	Hunor Szőcs / Cristian Pletea	11–2, 11–5, 14–12
Dimitrij Ovtcharov	3–0	Ovidiu Ionescu	13–11, 11–6, 12–10
Patrick Franziska	3–1	Cristian Pletea	7–11, 12–10, 11–8, 11–3

27 June 2019	Portugal	3 – 1	Great Britain

João Monteiro / Tiago Apolónia	3–1	Paul Drinkhall / Liam Pitchford	11–7, 11–6, 4–11, 11–8
Marcos Freitas	3–1	Sam Walker	8–11, 11–9, 11–8, 11–8
Tiago Apolónia	2–3	Liam Pitchford	8–11, 11–6, 11–8, 3–11, 7–11
João Monteiro	3–1	Sam Walker	5–11, 14–12, 11–9, 11–9

27 June 2019	Austria	1 – 3	Denmark

Daniel Habesohn / Robert Gardos	3–0	Tobias Rasmussen / Anders Lind	11–9, 11–8, 14–12
Stefan Fegerl	0–3	Jonathan Groth	6–11, 4–11, 0–11
Robert Gardos	2–3	Anders Lind	11–9, 9–11, 11–8, 3–11, 11–13
Daniel Habesohn	0–3	Jonathan Groth	8–11, 6–11, 9–11

27 June 2019	Croatia	2 – 3	Sweden

Frane Kojić / Andrej Gaćina	3–1	Kristian Karlsson / Jon Persson	14–12, 11–7, 8–11, 11–9
Tomislav Pucar	2–3	Mattias Falck	11–4, 7–11, 4–11, 11–8, 8–11
Frane Kojić	1–3	Jon Persson	8–11, 9–11, 11–9, 9–11
Tomislav Pucar	3–1	Kristian Karlsson	5–11, 11–9, 11–1, 16–14
Andrej Gaćina	1–3	Mattias Falck	11–9, 3–11, 10–12, 6–11

=== Semifinals ===
28 June 2019	Germany	3 – 0	Portugal

Timo Boll / Patrick Franziska	3–0	João Monteiro / Tiago Apolónia	12–10, 11–7, 16–14
Dimitrij Ovtcharov	3–0	Marcos Freitas	11–8, 11–2, 11–6
Patrick Franziska	3–2	Tiago Apolónia	7–11, 7–11, 11–8, 11–5, 11–6

28 June 2019	Denmark	1 – 3	Sweden

Anders Lind / Tobias Rasmussen	0–3	Jon Persson / Kristian Karlsson	5–11, 10–12, 6–11
Jonathan Groth	3–1	Mattias Falck	11–9, 11–6, 10–12, 11–7
Tobias Rasmussen	0–3	Kristian Karlsson	6–11, 8–11, 7–11
Anders Lind	1–3	Mattias Falck	5–11, 11–8, 5–11, 5–11

=== Bronze medal match ===
29 June 2019	Portugal	3 – 1	Denmark

João Monteiro / Tiago Apolónia	3–0	Tobias Rasmussen / Anders Lind	11–6, 11–5, 11–4
Marcos Freitas	1–3	Jonathan Groth	9–11, 13–11, 7–11, 7–11
João Monteiro	3–1	Anders Lind	6–11, 11–8, 11–8, 11–4
Marcos Freitas	3–1	Tobias Rasmussen	11–4, 9–11, 11–7, 12–10

=== Gold medal match ===
29 June 2019	Germany	3 – 0	Sweden

Timo Boll / Patrick Franziska	3–1	Kristian Karlsson / Jon Persson	11–9, 11–7, 7–11, 11–8
Dimitrij Ovtcharov	3–1	Mattias Falck	11–9, 10–12, 11–5, 11–7
Patrick Franziska	3–2	Jon Persson	12–14, 11–3, 11–7, 9–11, 11–9
