= Jaqueline Orth =

German sport shooter (born 1993)

Personal information
- Nationality: German
- Born: 10 February 1993 (age 33) Bad Hersfeld, Germany
- Height: 1.75 m (5 ft 9 in)

Sport
- Country: Germany
- Sport: Shooting
- Event: Air rifle
- Club: SV Niederaula
Medal record
World Championships
Gold medal – first place	2018 Changwon	50 m team rifle prone
Gold medal – first place	2018 Changwon	50 m team rifle 3 positions

Jaqueline Orth (born 10 February 1993) is a German sport shooter.

She participated at the 2018 ISSF World Shooting Championships, winning a medal.
