= Han Chol-sim =

North Korean sport shooter

Personal information
- Nationality: North Korean
- Born: 16 December 1993 (age 32)

Sport
- Country: North Korea
- Sport: Shooting
- Event: Air pistol
Medal record
World Championships
Silver medal – second place	2018 Changwon	10 m running target team
Asian Championships
Silver medal – second place	2019 Doha	10 m running target team

Han Chol-sim (born 16 December 1993) is a North Korean sport shooter.

She participated at the 2018 ISSF World Shooting Championships, winning a medal.
