= Karolina Pahlitzsch =

German sprinter (born 1994)

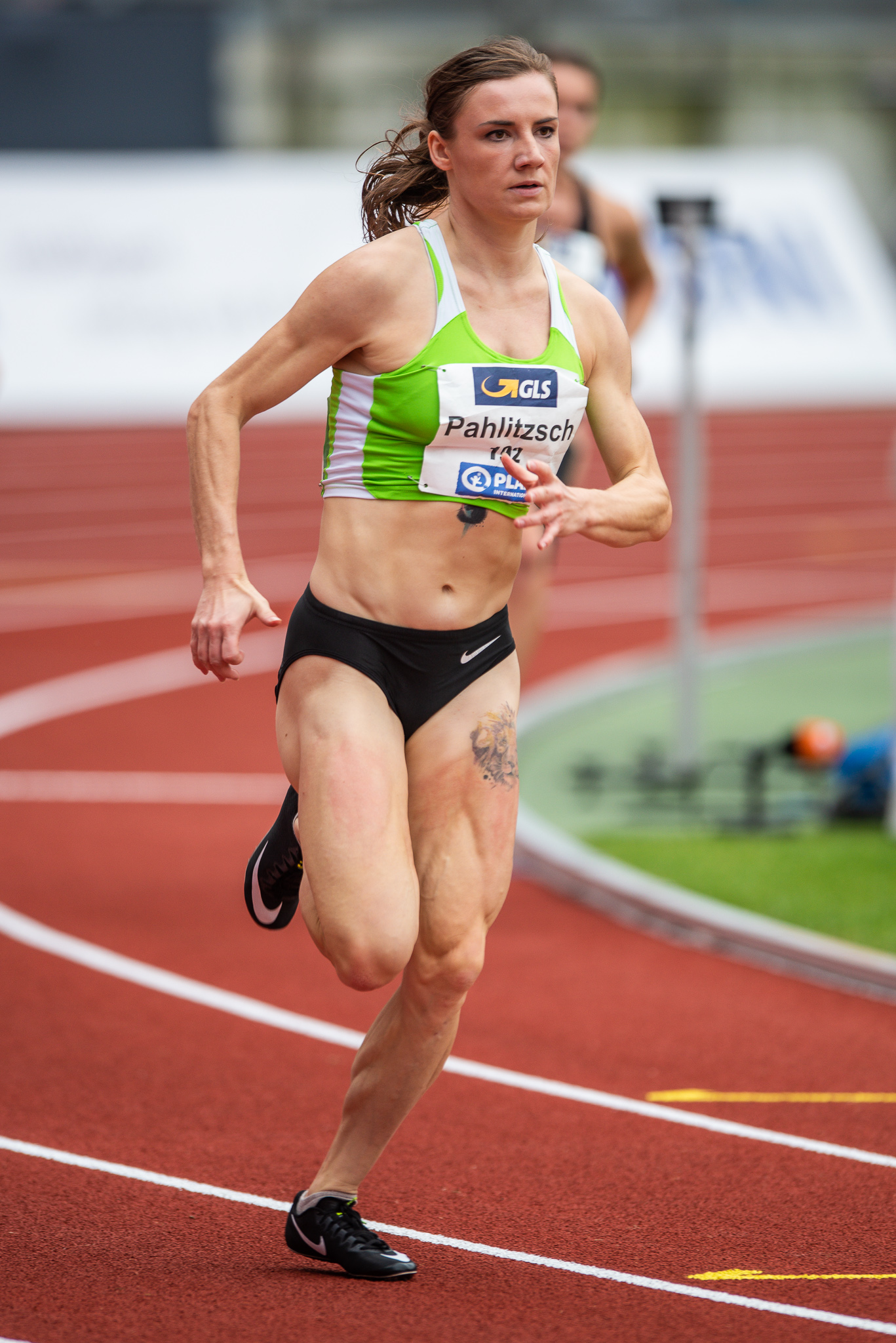
- Pahlitzsch in 2018

Personal information
- Nationality: German
- Born: 5 April 1994 (age 31)

Sport
- Sport: Athletics
- Event: Sprinting

Karolina Pahlitzsch (born 5 April 1994) is a German athlete. She competed in the mixed 4 × 400 metres relay event at the 2019 World Athletics Championships. In 2019, she won the bronze medal in the team event at the 2019 European Games held in Minsk, Belarus.
