= Christian Freckmann =

German sport shooter

Personal information
- Nationality: German
- Born: 18 July 1993 (age 32) Sondershausen, Germany
- Height: 1.79 m (5 ft 10 in)
- Weight: 82 kg (181 lb)

Sport
- Country: Germany
- Sport: Shooting
- Event: Air pistol
- Club: SG Rockstedt 1896 e.V.
Medal record
World Championships
Silver medal – second place	2018 Changwon	25 m team rapid fire pistol

Christian Freckmann (born 18 July 1993) is a German sport shooter.

He participated at the 2018 ISSF World Shooting Championships, winning a medal.
