= Yao Yushi =

Chinese sport shooter

Personal information
- Nationality: Chinese
- Born: 4 June 1989 (age 37)
- Height: 1.61 m (5 ft 3 in)
- Weight: 64 kg (141 lb)

Sport
- Country: China
- Sport: Shooting
- Event: Air pistol
Medal record
World Championships
Gold medal – first place	2018 Changwon	25 m team pistol

Yao Yushi (simplified Chinese: 姚雨诗; traditional Chinese: 姚雨詩; pinyin: Yáo Yǔshī; born 4 June 1989) is a Chinese sport shooter.

She participated at the 2018 ISSF World Shooting Championships, winning a medal.
