= Yu Haonan =

Chinese sport shooter (born 1999)

Personal information
- Nationality: Chinese
- Born: 12 April 1999 (age 27) Shaanxi, China

Sport
- Country: China
- Sport: Shooting
- Event: 10 metre air rifle
Medal record
World Championships
Gold medal – first place	2023 Baku	10 m air rifle team
World Cup Final
Bronze medal – third place	2019 Putian	10m air rifle mixed team
World Cup
Gold medal – first place	2019 Rio de Janeiro	10m air rifle
Asian Games
Bronze medal – third place	2022 Hangzhou	10 m air rifle team
Asian Championships
Gold medal – first place	2019 Doha	10 m air rifle team
Gold medal – first place	2023 Changwon	Mixed 10 m air rifle team
Silver medal – second place	2019 Doha	10 m air rifle
Silver medal – second place	2019 Doha	10 m air rifle mixed team
Silver medal – second place	2023 Changwon	10 m air rifle team

Yu Haonan (born 1999) is a Chinese sport shooter. He won the gold medal in the 10 m air rifle team at the 2023 ISSF World Championships.

Yu participated at the 2018 ISSF World Shooting Championships.
