= Huang Qingqing =

Chinese sport shooter

Personal information
- Nationality: Chinese
- Born: 15 December 2003 (age 22)

Sport
- Country: China
- Sport: Shooting
- Event: Running target shooting
Medal record
World Championships
Gold medal – first place	2018 Changwon	10 m team running target
Gold medal – first place	2018 Changwon	10 m team running target mixed

Huang Qingqing (born 15 December 2003) is a Chinese sport shooter.

She participated at the 2018 ISSF World Shooting Championships, winning a medal.
