= Julia Simon (sport shooter) =

German sport shooter

Personal information
- Nationality: German
- Born: 10 August 1991 (age 35)

Sport
- Country: Germany
- Sport: Shooting
- Event: Air rifle
Medal record
World Championships
Bronze medal – third place	2018 Changwon	10 m team air rifle

Julia Simon (born 10 August 1991) is a German sport shooter.

She participated at the 2018 ISSF World Shooting Championships.
