= Julian Justus =

German sports shooter (born 1988)

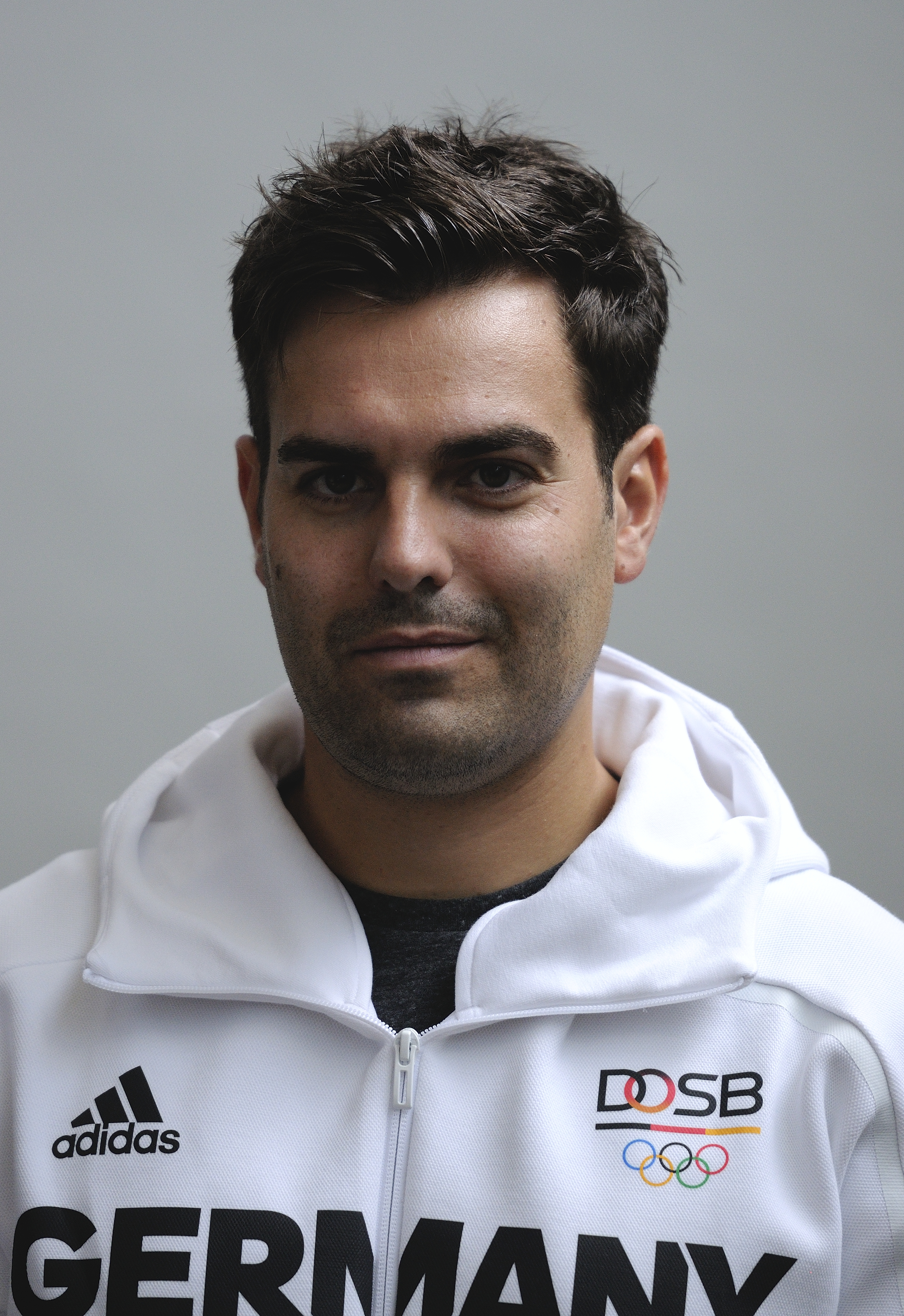
- Julian Justus in 2016

Personal information
- Nationality: German
- Born: 29 January 1988 (age 38) Giessen, West Germany
- Height: 179 cm (5 ft 10 in)
- Weight: 73 kg (161 lb)

Sport
- Sport: Sports shooting

Julian Justus (born 29 January 1988) is a German sports shooter. He competed in the Men's 10 metre air rifle event at the 2012 Summer Olympics and the 2016 Olympics.
