= Lin Yuemei =

Chinese sport shooter

Personal information
- Nationality: Chinese
- Born: 29 January 1994 (age 32) Fujian, China
- Height: 1.67 m (5 ft 6 in)
- Weight: 50 kg (110 lb)

Sport
- Country: China
- Sport: Shooting
- Event: Air pistol
Medal record
World Championships
Gold medal – first place	2018 Changwon	25 m team pistol

Lin Yuemei (Chinese: 林月美; pinyin: Lín Yuèměi; born 29 January 1994) is a Chinese sport shooter.

She participated at the 2018 ISSF World Shooting Championships, winning a medal.

She has qualified to represent China at the 2020 Summer Olympics.
