= Shahzar Rizvi =

Indian professional shooter (born 1994)

Personal information
- Nationality: Indian
- Born: 18 June 1994 (age 32) Mawana, India
- Height: 1.70 m (5 ft 7 in)
- Weight: 64 kg (141 lb)

Sport
- Country: India
- Sport: Shooting
- Rank: No.1 (1 May 2018)
- Event: 10 metre air pistol
Medal record
Men's shooting
Representing India
World Championships
Silver medal – second place	2018 Changwon	10 m team air pistol
World Cup
Gold medal – first place	2018 Mexico	10 m air pistol
Silver medal – second place	2018 Changwon	10 m air pistol

Shahzar Rizvi (born 18 June 1994) Is an Indian Ace shooter. As a shooter, competing in the 10 metre air pistol event, he won a gold medal in the 2018 ISSF World Cup and in 2017 Commonwealth Shooting Championships. Shahzar shot a world record score of 242.3 points in the final to clinch Gold on his debut in ISSF World Cup.

Shahzar Rizvi started his career in 2009. In 2018 he defeated all the gold medalist Olympians in ISSF World Cup in Mexico with Omprakash Mitharwal. Rizvi is a Team Member of A Team with Manu Bhaker and Omprkash Mitharwal. He created a World Record with a score 242.3 points.

== Early life ==
His early life was spent in Mawana Khurd, a small village in Meerut district, Uttar Pradesh, India. He is eldest among three siblings.
