= Wu Mingyang =

Chinese sport shooter

Personal information
- Nationality: Chinese
- Born: 21 January 1997 (age 29) Shandong, China
- Height: 1.66 m (5 ft 5 in)
- Weight: 70 kg (154 lb)

Sport
- Country: China
- Sport: Shooting
- Event: Air rifle
Medal record
World Championships
Silver medal – second place	2018 Changwon	Mixed 10 m air rifle

Wu Mingyang (simplified Chinese: 吴明阳; traditional Chinese: 吳明陽; pinyin: Wú Míngyáng; born 21 January 1997) is a Chinese sport shooter.

She participated at the 2018 ISSF World Shooting Championships.
