= Wang Mengyi =

Chinese sport shooter (born 1992)

Personal information
- Nationality: Chinese
- Born: 25 September 1992 (age 33)
- Height: 1.73 m (5 ft 8 in)
- Weight: 62 kg (137 lb)

Sport
- Country: China
- Sport: Shooting
- Event: Air pistol
Medal record
World Championships
Silver medal – second place	2018 Changwon	Mixed 10 m air pistol

Wang Mengyi (Chinese: 王猛毅; born 25 September 1992) is a Chinese sport shooter.

She participated at the 2018 ISSF World Shooting Championships.
