= Wu Jiayu =

Chinese sport shooter

Personal information
- Nationality: Chinese
- Born: 30 April 1997 (age 29)
- Height: 1.84 m (6 ft 0 in)
- Weight: 93 kg (205 lb)

Sport
- Country: China
- Sport: Shooting
- Event: Air pistol
Medal record
World Championships
Bronze medal – third place	2018 Changwon	50 m team pistol

Wu Jiayu (simplified Chinese: 吴嘉宇; traditional Chinese: 吳嘉宇; pinyin: Wú Jiāyǔ; born 30 April 1997) is a Chinese sport shooter.

He participated at the 2018 ISSF World Shooting Championships.
