= List of water polo players =

This is a list of water polo players:

| Contents: | Top - A B C D E F G H I J K L M N O P Q R S T U V W X Y Z |

== A ==
- (Netherlands) Johan Aantjes
- (Netherlands) Kees van Aelst
- (Russia) Viktor Ageev
- (Serbia) Milan Aleksić
- (Sweden) Erik Andersson
- (Sweden) Robert Andersson
- (Sweden) Vilhelm Andersson
- (Socialist Federal Republic of Yugoslavia) Dragan Andrić
- (Russia) Dmitry Apanasenko
- (Serbia) Marko Avramović
- (United States) Tony Azevedo

== B ==
- (Sweden) Nils Backlund
- (United States) Ryan Bailey
- (Socialist Federal Republic of Yugoslavia) Veljko Bakašun
- (Russia) Roman Balachov
- (Croatia) Maro Balić
- (Croatia) Samir Barać
- (Australia) Gemma Beadsworth
- (Netherlands) Marc van Belkum
- (Netherlands) Stan van Belkum
- (Hungary) Tibor Benedek
- (New Zealand) Ben Wharton Benedict
- (Netherlands) Bouke Benenga
- (Sweden) Erik Bergvall
- (Sweden) Erik Bergqvist
- (Netherlands) Wouly de Bie
- (Hungary) Péter Biros
- (Netherlands) Alex Boegschoten
- (Netherlands) Hellen Boering
- (Socialist Federal Republic of Yugoslavia) Ozren Bonačić
- (Netherlands) Bart Bongers
- (Netherlands) Karla van der Boon
- (Sweden) Arne Borg
- (Azerbaijan) Zenon Bortkevich
- (Croatia) Miho Bošković
- (Socialist Federal Republic of Yugoslavia) Marko Brainović
- (Netherlands) Mart Bras
- (Russia) Pyotr Breus
- (Netherlands) Bert Brinkman
- (Socialist Federal Republic of Yugoslavia) / (Croatia) Perica Bukić
- (Croatia) Ivan Buljubašić
- (Netherlands) Jan Bultman
- (Netherlands) Arie van de Bunt
- (Croatia) Damir Burić
- (Croatia) Andro Bušlje
- (Netherlands) Ton Buunk

== C ==
- (Australia) Naomi Castle
- (Georgia (country)) / (Russia) Givi Chikvanaia
- (Brazil) Izabella Chiappini
- (Socialist Federal Republic of Yugoslavia) Ivo Cipci
- (Serbia) Aleksandar Ćirić
- (Netherlands) Johan Cortlever
- (Australia) Nikita Cuffe
- (Serbia) Miloš Ćuk
- (Croatia) Fran Čubranić
- (Montenegro) Uroš Čučković

== D ==
- (Socialist Federal Republic of Yugoslavia) Dejan Dabović
- (Croatia) Teo Đogaš
- (Netherlands) Fred van Dorp
- (Russia) Dmitri Douguine
- (Socialist Federal Republic of Yugoslavia) Veselin Đuho
- (Croatia) Nikša Dobud

== E ==
- (Russia) Eduard Egorov
- (Croatia) Karlo Erak
- (Croatia) Vice Erak
- (Netherlands) Ed van Es

== F ==
- (Hong Kong) Kenji Fan
- (Italy) Pietro Figlioli
- (Serbia) Filip Filipović
- (Hungary) Rajmund Fodor
- (Australia) Joanne Fox
- (Socialist Federal Republic of Yugoslavia) Tomislav Franjković
- (Netherlands) Lex Franken
- (Australia) Suzie Fraser
- (Russia) Aleksandr Fyodorov

== G ==
- (Russia) Serguei Garbouzov
- (Hungary) István Gergely
- (Netherlands) Loet Geutjes
- (Croatia) Damir Glavan
- (Serbia) Živko Gocić
- (Australia) Taniele Gofers
- (Australia) Randall Goff
- (Georgia (country)) Leri Gogoladze
- (Montenegro) Vladimir Gojković
- (Russia) Dmitry Gorshkov
- (Russia) Boris Goykhman
- (Russia) Igor Grabovsky
- (Russia) Yury Grigorovsky
- (Russia) Yevgeny Grishin
- (Sweden) Max Gumpel
- (Australia) Bridgette Gusterson
- (Georgia (country)) Nodar Gvakhariya
- (Australia) Kate Gynther

== H ==
- Ru den Hamer
- Simone Hankin
- Pontus Hanson
- Robert Havekotte
- (Socialist Federal Republic of Yugoslavia) Zdravko Hebel
- Anton Heiden
- André Hermsen
- Henk Hermsen
- Wim Hermsen
- Jan van Heteren
- Amy Hetzel
- Yvette Higgins
- (Croatia) Igor Hinić
- Andy Hoepelman
- Hans Hoogveld
- Kate Hooper
- (Hungary) Norbert Hosnyánszky
- Jan Hulswit

== I ==
- Iouri Iatsev
- (Serbia) Danilo Ikodinović
- Koos Issard
- (Socialist Federal Republic of Yugoslavia) Vladimir Ivković

== J ==
- (Socialist Federal Republic of Yugoslavia) Zoran Janković
- (Montenegro) Mlađan Janović
- (Montenegro) Nikola Janović
- John Jansen
- (Serbia) Viktor Jelenić
- (Socialist Federal Republic of Yugoslavia) Zdravko Ježić
- (Montenegro) Predrag Jokić
- (Croatia) Maro Joković
- Frank Jordan
- (Serbia) Dragan Jovanović
- Harald Julin

== K ==
- Aleksandr Kabanov
- (Socialist Federal Republic of Yugoslavia) Hrvoje Kačić
- Anatoly Kartashov
- (Hungary) Tamás Kásás
- Giorgos Katsaounis
- (Hungary) Gábor Kis
- (Hungary) Gergely Kiss
- Ben Kniest
- Bronwen Knox
- Emma Knox
- Koos Köhler
- Sushil Kohli
- Aleksandr Kolotov
- (Croatia) Andrija Komadina
- Jan Jaap Korevaar
- (Serbia) Miloš Korolija
- Zoltan Kosz
- Sergey Kotenko
- (Socialist Federal Republic of Yugoslavia) Zdravko-Ćiro Kovačić
- Andriy Kovalenko
- Nikolay Kozlov
- Evert Kroon
- (Serbia) Nikola Kuljača
- Torsten Kumfeldt
- Vyacheslav Kurennoy
- (Socialist Federal Republic of Yugoslavia) Ivica Kurtini
- Nikolay Kuznetsov
- Vladimir Kuznetsov

== L ==
- Nico Landeweerd
- (Montenegro) Dejan Lazović
- Gijs van der Leden
- Bram Leenards
- Cornelis Leenheer
- Ingrid Leijendekker
- Patricia Libregts
- (Croatia) Kristian Lipar
- (Croatia) Luka Lončar
- (Socialist Federal Republic of Yugoslavia) Ronald Lopatni
- (Croatia) Deni Lušić

== M ==
- Hans Maier
- (Hungary) Norbert Madaras
- (Serbia) Dušan Mandić
- Tamás Marcz
- Boris Markarov
- (Socialist Federal Republic of Yugoslavia) Uroš Marović
- Nikolai Maximov
- Harry van der Meer
- Eduard Meijer
- Karel Meijer
- Nikolai Melnikov
- Nurlan Mendygaliev
- (Croatia) Kristijan Milaković
- (Socialist Federal Republic of Yugoslavia) Igor Milanović
- Marc Minguell
- Ruud Misdorp
- (Serbia) Branislav Mitrović
- (Serbia) Stefan Mitrović
- (Hungary) Tamás Molnár
- Ad Moolhuijzen
- P'et're Mshveniyeradze
- Hans Muller
- (Socialist Federal Republic of Yugoslavia) Milan Muškatirović
- (Croatia) Petar Muslim

== N ==
- Theodor Nauman
- Sergey Naumov
- (Socialist Federal Republic of Yugoslavia) Antun Nardeli
- Hans Nieuwenburg
- Dick Nieuwenhuizen
- (Serbia) Slobodan Nikić
- (Socialist Federal Republic of Yugoslavia) Franjo Nonković
- Eric Noordegraaf
- Roald van Noort
- Moriah van Norman
- Vladimir Novikov

== O ==
- (Croatia) Paulo Obradović
- Abraham van Olst
- Piet Ooms
- Soesoe van Oostrom Soede
- Adam Orrin

== P ==
- (Croatia) Lovro Paparić
- (Croatia) Josip Pavić
- Hans Parrel
- (Serbia) Branko Peković
- (Socialist Federal Republic of Yugoslavia) Đorđe Perišić
- Felipe Perrone
- (Serbia) Zoran Petrović
- (Brazil) Felipe Perrone
- Remco Pielstroom
- (Serbia) Duško Pijetlović
- (Serbia) Gojko Pijetlović
- (Socialist Federal Republic of Yugoslavia) Miroslav Poljak
- (Serbia) Dušan Popović
- (Serbia) Andrija Prlainović
- Boris Popov
- Valentin Prokopov

== R ==
- (Croatia) Marko Radulović
- (Serbia) Nikola Rađen
- (Socialist Federal Republic of Yugoslavia) Goran Rađenović
- (Socialist Federal Republic of Yugoslavia) Lovro Radonjić
- Gé Regter
- Andrei Reketchinski
- Joop Rohner

(Socialist Federal Republic of Yugoslavia) Vinko Rosić

- Ratko Rudić
- Johan Rühl
- Frits Ruimschotel
- Axel Runström
- Mikhail Ryzhak

== S ==
- (Netherlands) Piet Salomons
- (Azerbaijan) Yevgeny Saltsyn
- (Socialist Federal Republic of Yugoslavia) Mirko Sandić
- (Serbia) Aleksa Šaponjić
- (Serbia) Aleksandar Šapić
- (Serbia) Dejan Savić
- (Netherlands) John Scherrenburg
- (Netherlands) Wim van de Schilde
- (Netherlands) Ton Schmidt
- (Netherlands) Jan Scholte
- (Serbia) / (Montenegro) Denis Šefik
- (Russia) Vladimir Semyonov
- (Russia) Yevgeny Sharonov
- (Russia) Yury Shlyapin
- (Croatia) Dubravko Šimenc
- (Socialist Federal Republic of Yugoslavia) Zlatko Šimenc
- (Netherlands) Hans Smits
- (Serbia) Slobodan Soro
- (Socialist Federal Republic of Yugoslavia) Aleksandar Šoštar
- (Netherlands) Wim van Spingelen
- (Croatia) Marin Šparada
- (Croatia) Toni Šparada
- (Socialist Federal Republic of Yugoslavia) Ivo Štakula
- (Netherlands) Hans Stam
- (Socialist Federal Republic of Yugoslavia) Božidar Stanišić
- (Hungary) Barnabás Steinmetz
- (Socialist Federal Republic of Yugoslavia) Karlo Stipanić
- (Serbia) Nenad Stojčić
- (Russia) Dmitri Stratan
- (Netherlands) Gijze Stroboer
- (Socialist Federal Republic of Yugoslavia) Goran Sukno
- (Croatia) Sandro Sukno
- (Hungary) Zoltán Szécsi
- (Hungary) Bulcsu Szekely

== T ==
- (Russia) Revaz Tchomakhidze
- (Netherlands) Rik Toonen
- (Serbia) Petar Trbojević
- (Socialist Federal Republic of Yugoslavia) Ivo Trumbić

== U ==
- (Serbia) Vanja Udovičić
- (Montenegro) Veljko Uskoković

== V ==
- (Hungary) Dániel Varga
- (Hungary) Dénes Varga
- (Hungary) Tamás Varga
- (Hungary) Zsolt Varga (born 1972)
- (Hungary) Attila Vári
- (Serbia) Jugoslav Vasović
- (Netherlands) Herman Veenstra
- (Netherlands) Jan Evert Veer
- (Croatia) Frano Vićan
- (Netherlands) Nico van der Voet
- (Netherlands) Harry Vriend
- (Netherlands) Wim Vriend
- (Netherlands) Feike de Vries
- (Netherlands) Jan-Lodewijk de Vries
- (Croatia) Josip Vrlić
- (Croatia) Mislav Vrlić
- (Serbia) Vladimir Vujasinović
- (Montenegro) Nenad Vukanić
- (Socialist Federal Republic of Yugoslavia) Boško Vuksanović
- (Socialist Federal Republic of Yugoslavia) Božo Vuletić

== W ==
- (Netherlands) Jan Wagenaar
- (Sweden) Gunnar Wennerström
- (United States) Wolf Wigo
- (Netherlands) Joop van Woerkom
- (Netherlands) Gerrit Wormgoor
- (Netherlands) Hans Wouda

== Y ==
- (Russia) Yuri Yatsev
- (Russia) Alexander Yerishev
- (Russia) Vitaly Yurchik

== Z ==
- (Russia) Marat Zakirov
- (Netherlands) Hans van Zeeland
- (Serbia) Predrag Zimonjić
- (Russia) Irek Zinnourov
- (Montenegro) Boris Zloković
- (Socialist Federal Republic of Yugoslavia) Marijan Žužej
- (Netherlands) Piet de Zwarte
