= Netherlands men's national water polo team =

Men's national water polo team representing the Netherlands

Netherlands
- FINA code: NED
- Association: Royal Dutch Swimming Federation
- Confederation: LEN (Europe)
- Head coach: Branko Mitrović
- Asst coach: Sebastiaan Brands; Blagoje Ivović
- Captain: Bilal Gbadamassi

FINA ranking (since 2008)
- Current: 15 (as of 9 August 2021)

Olympic Games (team statistics)
- Appearances: 17 (first in 1908)
- Best result: (bronze) (1948, 1976)

World Championship
- Appearances: 7 (first in 1973)
- Best result: 4th (1982)

World Cup
- Appearances: 3 (first in 1983)
- Best result: 6th (1983, 1985)

World League
- Appearances: 4 (first in 2003)
- Best result: 6th (2003, 2025)

European Championship
- Appearances: 31 (first in 1927)
- Best result: (gold) (1950)

Media
- Website: knzb.nl
Medal record
Men's water polo
Olympic Games
Bronze medal – third place	1948 London	Team
Bronze medal – third place	1976 Montréal	Team
European Championship
Gold medal – first place	1950 Vienna
Bronze medal – third place	1938 London

The Netherlands national water polo team represents the Netherlands in men's international water polo competitions and friendly matches. The team won bronze medals at the 1948 Summer Olympics and the 1976 Summer Olympics.

== Results ==
=== Medal count ===
Competition	1st place, gold medalist(s)	2nd place, silver medalist(s)	3rd place, bronze medalist(s)	Total
Olympic Games	0	0	2	2
European Championship	1	0	1	2
Total	1	0	3	4

=== Olympic Games ===
- 1908 – 4th place
- 1920 – 5th place
- 1924 – 7th place
- 1928 – 5th place
- 1936 – 5th place
- 1948 – (bronze) Bronze medal
- 1952 – 5th place
- 1960 – 8th place
- 1964 – 8th place
- 1968 – 7th place
- 1972 – 7th place
- 1976 – (bronze) Bronze medal
- 1980 – 6th place
- 1984 – 6th place
- 1992 – 9th place
- 1996 – 10th place
- 2000 – 11th place

=== World Championship ===
- 1973 – 8th place
- 1975 – 7th place
- 1978 – 13th place
- 1982 – 4th place
- 1986 – 14th place
- 1994 – 8th place
- 2001 – 9th place

=== FINA World Cup ===
- 1983 – 6th place
- 1985 – 6th place
- 1995 – 7th place
- 2025 – 6th place

=== FINA World League ===
- 2003 – 6th place
- 2011 – European Preliminary round
- 2017 – European Preliminary round
- 2018 – European Preliminary round

=== European Championship ===
- 1927 – 11th place
- 1934 – 9th place
- 1938 – (bronze) Bronze medal
- 1947 – 5th place
- 1950 – (gold) Gold medal
- 1954 – 4th place
- 1958 – 6th place
- 1962 – 6th place
- 1966 – 8th place
- 1970 – 5th place
- 1974 – 4th place
- 1977 – 5th place
- 1981 – 8th place
- 1983 – 6th place
- 1985 – 7th place
- 1989 – 8th place
- 1991 – 9th place
- 1993 – 8th place
- 1995 – 10th place
- 1997 – 9th place
- 1999 – 12th place
- 2001 – 10th place
- 2003 – 11th place
- 2006 – 10th place
- 2012 – 10th place
- 2016 – 12th place
- 2018 – 10th place
- 2020 – 15th place
- 2022 – 11th place
- 2024 – 11th place
- 2026 – 11th place

== Team ==
=== Current squad ===
Roster for the 2026 Men's European Water Polo Championship.

Head coach: (Serbia) Branko Mitrović

Name	Date of birth	Pos.	Club
Miki Buitenhuis	16 September 2002 (age 23)	GK	(Netherlands) UZSC
Bilal Gbadamassi (C)	23 September 1997 (age 28)	CF	(France) CN Marseille
Jeroen Rouwenhorst	10 January 2000 (age 26)	CF	(Italy) RN Florentia
Benjamin Hessels	13 December 2001 (age 24)	DF	(Hungary) OSC Budapest
Mart van der Weijden	20 October 2003 (age 22)	W	(Spain) CN Barcelona
Tim de Mey	18 December 1997 (age 28)	W	(Italy) RN Florentia
Kas Te Riele	21 August 2002 (age 23)	W	(Greece) NC Vouliagmeni
Sebastian Hessels	13 December 2001 (age 24)	W	(Hungary) OSC Budapest
Sam van den Burg	25 October 1997 (age 28)	DF	(Germany) Waspo'98 Hannover
Tom de Weerd	16 April 1998 (age 27)	W	(Spain) Tenerife Echeyde
Marnick Snel	2 October 2004 (age 21)	DF	(Croatia) VK Primorje
Lars ten Broek	23 February 2004 (age 21)	W	(Spain) CN San Andreu
Jelto Spijker	29 August 1999 (age 26)	GK	(Germany) Spandau 04
Niels Hofmeijer	19 June 2000 (age 25)	DF	(Italy) RN Florentia
Jorrit van der Weijen	13 November 2006 (age 19)	W	(Netherlands) GZC Donk

=== Past squads ===
- 1908 Olympic Games – 4th place

- Bouke Benenga, Johan Cortlever, Jan Hulswit, Eduard Meijer, Karel Meijer, Piet Ooms, and Johan Rühl.

- 1960 Olympic Games – 8th place

- Fred van Dorp, Henk Hermsen, Ben Kniest, Harry Lamme, Bram Leenards, Hans Muller, Harro Ran, Harry Vriend, and Fred van der Zwan.

- 1964 Olympic Games – 8th place

- Jan Bultman, Fred van Dorp, Henk Hermsen, Ben Kniest, Bram Leenards, Hans Muller, Wim van Spingelen, Nico van der Voet, Harry Vriend, Wim Vriend, and Gerrit Wormgoor.

- 1968 Olympic Games – 7th place

- Bart Bongers, Fred van Dorp, Loet Geutjes, André Hermsen, Hans Hoogveld, Evert Kroon, Ad Moolhuijzen, Hans Parrel, Nico van der Voet, Feike de Vries, and Hans Wouda.

- 1972 Olympic Games – 7th place

- Mart Bras, Ton Buunk, Wim Hermsen, Hans Hoogveld, Evert Kroon, Hans Parrel, Ton Schmidt, Wim van de Schilde, Gijze Stroboer, Jan Evert Veer, and Hans Wouda.

- 1976 Olympic Games – Bronze Medal

- Alex Boegschoten, Ton Buunk, Andy Hoepelman, Evert Kroon, Nico Landeweerd, Hans Smits, Gijze Stroboer, Rik Toonen, Jan Evert Veer, Hans van Zeeland, and Piet de Zwarte.

- 1980 Olympic Games – 6th place

- Stan van Belkum, Wouly de Bie, Ton Buunk, Jan Jaap Korevaar, Nico Landeweerd, Aad van Mil, Ruud Misdorp, Dick Nieuwenhuizen, Eric Noordegraaf, Jan Evert Veer, and Hans van Zeeland.

- 1984 Olympic Games – 6th place

- Johan Aantjes, Stan van Belkum, Wouly de Bie, Ton Buunk, Ed van Es, Anton Heiden, Nico Landeweerd, Aad van Mil, Ruud Misdorp, Dick Nieuwenhuizen, Eric Noordegraaf, Roald van Noort, and Remco Pielstroom.

- 1992 Olympic Games – 9th place

- Bert Brinkman, Arie van de Bunt, Marc van Belkum, Robert Havekotte, Koos Issard, John Jansen, Gijs van der Leden, Harry van der Meer, Hans Nieuwenburg, Remco Pielstroom, John Scherrenburg, Jalo de Vries, and Jan Wagenaar.

- 1996 Olympic Games – 10th place

- Arie van de Bunt, Gert de Groot, Arno Havenga, Koos Issard, Bas de Jong, Niels van der Kolk, Marco Kunz, Harry van der Meer, Hans Nieuwenburg, Joeri Stoffels, Eelco Uri, Wim Vermeulen and Wyco de Vries. Head Coach: Hans van Zeeland.

- 2000 Olympic Games – 11th place

- Arie van de Bunt, Marco Booij, Bjørn Boom, Bobbie Brebde, Matthijs de Bruijn, Arno Havenga, Bas de Jong, Harry van der Meer, Gerben Silvis, Kimmo Thomas, Eelco Uri, Wim Vermeulen, and Niels Zuidweg. Head Coach: Johan Aantjes.

- 2004 Olympic Qualifying Tournament – 5th place

- Marco Booij, Bjørn Boom, Kjell Boom, Matthijs de Bruijn, Arno Havenga, Bas de Jong, Gijs de Kock, Tjerk Kramer, Marc Nolting, Mark Siewers, Gerben Silvis, Eelco Uri, Niels Zuidweg. Head Coach: Ron de Vogel.

== See also ==
- Netherlands men's Olympic water polo team records and statistics
- Netherlands women's national water polo team
