= Alphense Zwemclub =

Alphense Zwemclub (in English: Alphense Swim Club), shortly AZC or Alphen is a Dutch water polo and swimming club from Alphen aan den Rijn. The club has competitive departments for sports like water polo, synchronized swimming, competitive swimming, and diving. Additionally AZC has an active youth with mini water polo for children from 7 years.

== History ==
The Alphense Swim Club was founded on March 17, 1926. The association participates to the KNZB.

The previous sponsor of AZC was Electrolux, which was built between 2005 and 2010 was released with the name Electrolux AZC. Other well-known sponsors from the past: Unique, Microlife, Intervam, Tarvo, Converse, Peter Langhout Travel, Hans Verkerk kitchens and Sprey Wood wood imports.

AZC is among the men in the Dutch water polo Premier League. The club has seven men's teams and several youth teams playing in the various water polo competitions.

The women's teams of AZC played between 2006 and 2012 in a community starts with the Gouwe from Waddinxveen. Since the 2012-2013 season they play again with a women's team under his own name in the league.

AZC is the association which in recent decades has dominated Dutch men's water polo since 1976 by dragging inside include 20 league titles and 21 national cups.

AZC was for years the main supplier of men's national team. AZC is the only association of Dutch soil that has lain several times in the final of the European gentlemen opposite include the Italian Pro Recco and Catalunya from Barcelona.

== Titles & achievements ==
=== Domestic competitions ===
Dutch League

- Winners (20): 1976-77, 1977–78, 1978–79, 1980–81, 1982–83, 1983–84, 1984–85, 1985–86, 1986–87, 1987–88, 1988–89, 1992–93, 1993–94, 1996–97, 1997–98, 1999-00, 2000–01, 2001–02, 2002–03, 2003-04

Dutch Cup (KZNB)

- Winners (19): 1977-78, 1978–79, 1980–81, 1981–82, 1982–83, 1983–84, 1984–85, 1986–87, 1987–88, 1988–89, 1989–90, 1990–91, 1992–93, 1993–94, 1995–96, 1999-00, 2000–01, 2002–03, 2004–05

=== European competitions ===
LEN Champions League

- Runner-up (1): 1983-84
- 4th place (1): 1981-82

LEN Cup Winners' Cup

- Runner-up (1): 1990-91

== Famous (former) water polo players ==
- (Netherlands) Stan van Belkum
- (Netherlands) Bjørn Boom
- (Netherlands) Bobbie Brebde
- (Netherlands) Ton Buunk
- (Netherlands) Ed van Es
- (Netherlands) John Jansen
- (Netherlands) Gijs van der Leden
- (Netherlands) Ruud Misdorp
- (Netherlands) Eric Noordegraaf
- (Netherlands) Remco Pielstroom
- (Netherlands) Hans Parrel
- (Netherlands) Hans Stam
- (Netherlands) Joeri Stoffels
- (Netherlands) Gijze Stroboer
- (Netherlands) Kimmo Thomas
- (Netherlands) Niels Zuidweg
