= Netherlands at the 2000 Summer Olympics =

- Flag of the Netherlands
- IOC code: NED
- NOC: Dutch Olympic Committee*; Dutch Sports Federation
- Website: www.nocnsf.nl (in Dutch)

in Sydney
- Competitors: 243
- Flag bearers: Anky van Grunsven (opening); Inge de Bruijn (closing)
- Medals Ranked 8th: Gold 12 Silver 9 Bronze 4 Total 25

Summer Olympics appearances (overview)
- 1900; 1904; 1908; 1912; 1920; 1924; 1928; 1932; 1936; 1948; 1952; 1956; 1960; 1964; 1968; 1972; 1976; 1980; 1984; 1988; 1992; 1996; 2000; 2004; 2008; 2012; 2016; 2020; 2024

Other related appearances
- 1906 Intercalated Games

The Netherlands competed at the 2000 Summer Olympics in Sydney, Australia.

Sydney 2000 marked the first time the Dutch Olympic team competed in Australia as the Netherlands and other European nations boycotted the 1956 Summer Olympics in Melbourne due to the Soviet invasion of Hungary but the Netherlands did take part in the Equestrian events at the 1956 Summer Olympics in Stockholm five months earlier with a lone rider of the nation.

== Medalists ==
Medals per day
Day	Date	Gold medal	Silver medal	Bronze medal	Total
Day 1	16th	0	1	0	1
Day 2	17th	1	0	0	1
Day 3	18th	1	0	0	1
Day 4	19th	1	0	1	2
Day 5	20th	2	0	1	3
Day 6	21st	1	1	0	2
Day 7	22nd	0	0	1	1
Day 8	23rd	1	1	0	2
Day 9	24th	0	2	0	2
Day 10	25th	0	0	0	0
Day 11	26th	1	0	0	1
Day 12	27th	0	1	0	1
Day 13	28th	0	1	0	1
Day 14	29th	1	1	1	3
Day 15	30th	2	0	0	2
Day 16	1st	1	1	0	2
Total		12	9	4	25
Medals per sport
Sport		Gold medal	Silver medal	Bronze medal	Total
Archery		0	0	1	1
Cycling		3	1	0	4
Equestrian		2	2	0	4
Field hockey		1	0	1	2
Judo		1	0	0	1
Rowing		0	3	0	3
Sailing		0	1	0	1
Swimming		5	1	2	8
Tennis		0	1	0	1
Total		12	9	4	25

Medal	Name	Sport	Event	Date
Gold	Leontien Zijlaard	Cycling	Women's road race	September 26
Gold	Leontien Zijlaard	Cycling	Women's road time trial	September 30
Gold	Leontien Zijlaard	Cycling	Women's individual pursuit	September 18
Gold	Anky van Grunsven	Equestrian	Dressage Individual	September 30
Gold	Jeroen Dubbeldam	Equestrian	Show Jumping Individual	September 27
Gold	Netherlands national field hockey team: Jacques Brinkman; Jaap-Derk Buma; Teun de Nooijer; Jeroen Delmee; Marten Eikelboom; Piet-Hein Geeris; Ronald Jansen; Erik Jazet; Bram Lomans; Sander van der Weide; Wouter van Pelt; Diederik van Weel; Remco van Wijk; Stephan Veen; Guus Vogels; Peter Windt	Field hockey	Men's competition	September 30
Gold	Mark Huizinga	Judo	Men's 90 kg	September 20
Gold	Pieter van den Hoogenband	Swimming	Men's 100 m freestyle	September 20
Gold	Pieter van den Hoogenband	Swimming	Men's 200 m freestyle	September 18
Gold	Inge de Bruijn	Swimming	Women's 50 m freestyle	September 23
Gold	Inge de Bruijn	Swimming	Women's 100 m freestyle	September 20
Gold	Inge de Bruijn	Swimming	Women's 100 m butterfly	September 17
Silver	Leontien Zijlaard	Cycling	Women's points race	September 21
Silver	Ellen Bontje, Arjen Teeuwissen, Coby van Baalen, Anky van Grunsven	Equestrian	Dressage Team	September 26
Silver	Albert Voorn	Equestrian	Show Jumping Individual	September 27
Silver	Michiel Bartman, Dirk Lippits, Diederik Simon, Jochem Verberne	Rowing	Men's quadruple sculls	September 24
Silver	Pieta van Dishoeck, Eeke van Nes	Rowing	Women's double sculls	September 23
Silver	Tessa Appeldoorn, Elien Meijer, Nelleke Penninx, Martijntje Quik, Carin ter Beek, Pieta van Dishoeck, Eeke van Nes, Anneke Venema, Marieke Westerhof	Rowing	Women's eight	September 24
Silver	Margriet Matthijsse	Sailing	Europe	September 29
Silver	Inge de Bruijn, Chantal Groot, Thamar Henneken, Wilma van Hofwegen, Manon van Rooijen	Swimming	Women's 4 x 100 m freestyle relay	September 16
Silver	Kristie Boogert, Miriam Oremans	Tennis	Women's doubles	September 27
Bronze	Wietse van Alten	Archery	Men's individual	September 20
Bronze	Netherlands national field hockey team: Minke Booij; Ageeth Boomgaardt; Julie Deiters; Mijntje Donners; Clarinda Sinnige; Fatima Moreira de Melo; Hanneke Smabers; Minke Smabers; Margje Teeuwen; Carole Thate; Daphne Touw; Fleur van de Kieft; Dillianne van den Boogaard; Macha van der Vaart; Suzan van der Wielen; Myrna Veenstra	Field hockey	Women's competition	September 29
Bronze	Pieter van den Hoogenband	Swimming	Men's 50 m freestyle	September 22
Bronze	Johan Kenkhuis, Pieter van den Hoogenband, Mark van der Zijden, Marcel Wouda, Martijn Zuijdweg	Swimming	Men's 4 x 200 m freestyle relay	September 19

== Archery ==
Athlete	Event	Ranking round		Round of 64	Round of 32	Round of 16	Quarterfinals	Semifinals	Finals / BM	
Athlete	Event	Score	Seed	Opposition Score	Opposition Score	Opposition Score	Opposition Score	Opposition Score	Opposition Score	Rank
Wietse van Alten	Men's individual	638	12	Aulio (FIN) (53); W 163–160	Targonski (POL) (21); W 160–157	Zabrodskiy (KAZ) (5); W 166–154	Flute (FRA) (52); W 106–102	Fairweather (AUS) (8); L 110–112	Petersson (SWE) (6); W 114–109	3rd place, bronze medalist(s)
Henk Vogels	Men's individual	634	20	Nesteng (NOR) (45); L 149–158	Did not advance					57
Fred van Zutphen	Men's individual	638	12	Lipponen (FIN) (36); W 161–155	White (USA) (4); W 153–152	Flute (FRA) (52); L 159–166	Did not advance			16
Wietse van Alten; Henk Vogels; Fred van Zutphen	Men's team	1899	5	—N/a		Russia (12); L 241–248	Did not advance			9

== Athletics ==
Men
Track & road events

Athlete	Event	Heat		Quarterfinal		Semifinal		Final	
Athlete	Event	Result	Rank	Result	Rank	Result	Rank	Result	Rank
Bram Som	800 m	1:48.58	42	—N/a		Did not advance			
Marko Koers	1500 m	03:39.16	14 q	—N/a		03:39.42	9	Did not advance	
Robin Korving	110 m hurdles	Did not start		Did not advance					
Simon Vroemen	3000 m steeplechase	08:22.13	3 Q	—N/a				8:37.87	12
Kamiel Maase	Marathon	—N/a						2:16:24	13
Greg van Hest	Marathon	—N/a						2:18:00	25

Field events

Athlete	Event	Qualification		Final	
Athlete	Event	Distance	Position	Distance	Position
Wilbert Pennings	High jump	2.20	23	Did not advance	
Rens Blom	Pole vault	5.65	15	Did not advance	

Women
Track & road events

Athlete	Event	Heat		Quarterfinal		Semifinal		Final	
Athlete	Event	Result	Rank	Result	Rank	Result	Rank	Result	Rank
Nadezhda Wijenberg	Marathon	—N/a						2:32:29	22

Field events

Athlete	Event	Qualification		Final	
Athlete	Event	Distance	Position	Distance	Position
Lieja Koeman	Shot put	17.99	12	17.96	9

== Badminton ==
Athlete	Event	Round of 64	Round of 32	Round of 16	Quarterfinals	Semifinals	Finals / BM	
Athlete	Event	Opposition Score	Opposition Score	Opposition Score	Opposition Score	Opposition Score	Opposition Score	Rank
Quinten van Dalm; Dennis Lens	Men's Doubles	—N/a	Teerawiwatana & Panvisvas (THA); L 15–11 15–7	Did not advance				
Judith Meulendijks	Women's Singles	BYE	Ye Zhaoying (CHN); L 11–3 9–11 11–7	Did not advance				
Mia Audina	Women's Singles	BYE	McGinn (IRL); W 11–3 11–6	Chan (TPE); W 11–2 11–2	Martin (DEN); L 2–11 1–11	Did not advance		
Lotte Jonathans; Nicole van Hooren	Women's Doubles	—N/a	BYE	Grether & Stechmann (GER); W 15–7, 15–4	Nanyan & Wei (CHN); L 10–15 12–15	Did not advance		
Erica van den Heuvel; Chris Bruil	Mixed Doubles	—N/a	Hardy & Bamford (AUS); W 15–10 15–3	Fei & Yong (CHN); W 17–15 15–7	Archer & Goode (GBR); L 12–15 12–15	Did not advance		

== Baseball ==
In their second appearance in Olympic baseball, The Netherlands repeated their fifth-place finish. They scored victories over Australia and Italy to begin (→ game 1) and end (→ game 7) the preliminary round, but suffered four defeats in between (→ games 2, 3, 5, and 6). In game 4, however, the Dutch team served Cuba its first defeat in the history of Olympic baseball, breaking a 21-game winning streak (→ in its third Olympiad) by the Cubans.

Team roster

- Sharnol Adriana
- Sharnol Leonard
- Johnny Balentina
- Patrick Beljaards
- Ken Brauckmiller
- Rob Cordemans
- Jeffrey Cranston
- Mike Crouwel
- Radhames Dijkhoff
- Robert Eenhoorn
- Rikkert Faneyte
- Evert-Jan 't Hoen
- Chairon Isenia

- Percy Isenia
- Eelco Jansen
- Ferenc Jongejan
- Dirk van 't Klooster
- Patrick de Lange
- Reily Legito
- Jurriaan Lobbezoo
- Remy Maduro
- Hensley Meulens
- Ralph Milliard
- Erik Remmerswaal
- Orlando Stewart

- Head coach: Pat Murphy

Results

Pos	Team	Pld	W	L	RF	RA	RD	PCT	GB	Qualification
1	Cuba	7	6	1	50	17	+33	.857 (Note: Cuba defeated the United States 6–1.)	—	Advance to knockout round
2	United States	7	6	1	42	14	+28	.857	—	Advance to knockout round
3	South Korea	7	4	3	40	26	+14	.571 (Note: South Korea defeated Japan 7–6.)	2	Advance to knockout round
4	Japan	7	4	3	41	23	+18	.571	2	Advance to knockout round
5	Netherlands	7	3	4	19	29	−10	.429	3	
6	Italy	7	2	5	33	43	−10	.286 (Note: Italy defeated Australia 8–7.)	4	
7	Australia (H)	7	2	5	30	41	−11	.286	4	
8	South Africa	7	1	6	11	73	−62	.143	5	

(H) Hosts
Notes:

17 September	Australia	4–6	Netherlands	Sydney Baseball Stadium; Attendance: 13,762
17 September		Boxscore		Sydney Baseball Stadium; Attendance: 13,762

18 September	Japan	10–2	Netherlands	Sydney Baseball Stadium; Attendance: 11,360
18 September		Boxscore		Sydney Baseball Stadium; Attendance: 11,360

19 September	Netherlands	2–6	United States	Blacktown Olympic Park; Attendance: 3,352
19 September		Boxscore		Blacktown Olympic Park; Attendance: 3,352

20 September	Netherlands	4–2	Cuba	Sydney Baseball Stadium; Attendance: 12,450
20 September		Boxscore		Sydney Baseball Stadium; Attendance: 12,450

22 September	South Korea	2–0	Netherlands	Blacktown Olympic Park; Attendance: 3,350
22 September		Boxscore		Blacktown Olympic Park; Attendance: 3,350

23 September	Netherlands	2–3 (F/10)	South Africa	Blacktown Olympic Park; Attendance: 3,484
23 September		Boxscore		Blacktown Olympic Park; Attendance: 3,484

24 September	Italy	2–3	Netherlands	Blacktown Olympic Park; Attendance: 3,439
24 September		Boxscore		Blacktown Olympic Park; Attendance: 3,439

== Cycling ==
=== Road ===
Men

Athlete	Event	Time	Rank
Léon van Bon	Road race	5:30:46	25
Erik Dekker	Time trial	1:01:40	29
Erik Dekker	Road race	did not Finish	
Max van Heeswijk	Road race	5:30:46	15
Tristan Hoffman	Road race	5:36:14	80
Koos Moerenhout	Time trial	1:01:27	26
Koos Moerenhout	Road race	did not Finish	

Women

Athlete	Event	Time	Rank
Chantal Beltman	Road race	3:10:34	36
Mirjam Melchers	Time trial	0:44:12	11
Mirjam Melchers	Road race	3:06:31	12
Leontien Zijlaard	Time trial	0:42:00	1st place, gold medalist(s)
Leontien Zijlaard	Road race	3:06:31	1st place, gold medalist(s)

=== Mountain bike ===
Athlete	Event	Time	Rank
Bart Brentjes	Men's cross-country	2:14:41.95	12
Bas van Dooren	Men's cross-country	2:14:37.26	11
Patrick Tolhoek	Men's cross-country	did not finish	
Corine Dorland	Women's cross-country	1:59:59.36	17

=== Track ===
Pursuit

Athlete	Event	Qualification		Quarterfinals		Semifinals		Finals	
Athlete	Event	Time	Rank	Opponent Results	Rank	Opponent Results	Rank	Opponent Results	Rank
John den Braber; Robert Slippens; Jens Mouris; Wilco Zuijderwijk; Peter Schep	Men's team pursuit	4:09.590	7 q	Ukraine; LAP	7	did not advance			
Leontien Zijlaard	Women's individual pursuit	3:31.570	1 q	—N/a		Ulmer (NZL); 3:30.816	1	Clignet (FRA); 3:33.360	1st place, gold medalist(s)

Omnium

Athlete	Event	Points	Laps	Rank
Wilco Zuijderwijk	Men's points race	3	0	18
Leontien Zijlaard	Women's points race	16	0	2nd place, silver medalist(s)
Danny Stam; Robert Slippens	Men's madison	8	0	8

== Equestrian ==
=== Dressage ===
Athlete	Horse	Event	Grand Prix		Grand Prix Special			Grand Prix Freestyle		Overall	
Athlete	Horse	Event	Score	Rank	Score	Total	Rank	Score	Rank	Score	Rank
Anky van Grunsven	Bonfire	Individual	75.00	2 Q	78.13	153.13	1 Q	86.05	1	239.18	1st place, gold medalist(s)
Coby van Baalen	Ferro	Individual	74.92	3 Q	71.34	146.26	7 Q	75.10	4	221.36	5
Ellen Bontje	Silvano	Individual	71.44	9 Q	72.60	146.26	8 Q	73.55	7	217.59	6
Arjen Teeuwissen	Goliath	Individual	73.24	6 Q	70.46	143.70	9 *	did not Advance			
Anky van Grunsven; Coby van Baalen; Ellen Bontje; Arjen Teeuwissen	See above	Team	—N/a							5579	2nd place, silver medalist(s)

* Arjen Teeuwissen was qualified to compete in the Grand Prix Freestyle, but due to a restriction on the number of nation quotas (maximum number is 3), he could not continue to the final round.

=== Show jumping ===
Athlete	Horse	Event	Qualification								Final				Total	
Athlete	Horse	Event	Round 1		Round 2			Round 3			Round A		Round B		Total	
Athlete	Horse	Event	Penalties	Rank	Penalties	Total	Rank	Penalties	Total	Rank	Penalties	Rank	Penalties	Rank	Penalties	Rank
Jeroen Dubbeldam	Sjiem	Individual	0.50	=1	8.00	8.50	=7	4.00	12.50	5 Q	0.00	=1 Q	4.00	=3	0.00	1st place, gold medalist(s)
Jos Lansink	Carthago Z	Individual	9.00	=27	4.00	13.00	=15	8.00	21.00	=21 Q	12.00	=20 Q	8.00		—N/a	
Jan Tops	Roofs	Individual	6.25	20	13.25	19.50	35	12.00	31.50	41*	did not advance					
Albert Voorn	Lando	Individual	12.00	=35	4.00	16.00	=23	4.00	20.000	=18 Q	4.00	=5 Q	0.00	=1	4.00	2nd place, silver medalist(s)
Jeroen Dubbeldam; Jos Lansink; Jan Tops; Albert Voorn	See above	Team	16.00	6	16.00	32.00	=4	—N/a							32.00	5

* Jan Tops was qualified to compete in the Final, but due to a restriction on the number of nation quotas (maximum number is 3), he could not continue.

== Judo ==
Men

Athlete	Event	Preliminary Round	Round of 32	Round of 16	Quarterfinals	Semifinals	Repechage 1	Repechage 2	Repechage 3	Final / BM	
Athlete	Event	Opposition score	Opposition score	Opposition score	Opposition score	Opposition score	Opposition score	Opposition score	Opposition score	Opposition score	Rank
Patrick van Kalken	-66 kg	Bye	Nyamlkhavga (MGL); W	Nakamura (JPN); W	Baglayev (KAZ); W	Özkan (TUR); L	Bye			Vazagashvili (GEO); L	5
Maarten Arens	-81 kg	Bye	Bouras (FRA); L	did not advance			Arteaga (CUB); W	Ok-Chol (PRK); L	did not advance		
Mark Huizinga	-90 kg	Bye	Despaigne (CUB); W	Olson (USA); W	Croitoru (ROU); W	Morgan (CAN); W	Bye			Honorato (BRA); W	1st place, gold medalist(s)
Ben Sonnemans	-100 kg	Bye	Gill (CAN); L	did not advance			Soares (POR); W	Jikurauli (GEO); L	did not advance		
Dennis van der Geest	+100 kg	Bye	Tmenov (RUS); L	did not advance			Möller (GER); W	Pan (CHN); L	did not advance		

Women

Athlete	Event	Preliminary Round	Round of 32	Round of 16	Quarterfinals	Semifinals	Repechage 1	Repechage 2	Repechage 3	Final / BM	
Athlete	Event	Opposition score	Opposition score	Opposition score	Opposition score	Opposition score	Opposition score	Opposition score	Opposition score	Opposition score	Rank
Deborah Gravenstijn	-52 kg	—N/a	Bye	Kye (PRK); L	did not advance		Wolf (USA); W	Sullivan (AUS); W	León (ESP); W	Liu (CHN); L	5
Jessica Gal	-57 kg	—N/a	Christea (MDA); W	Andersson (SWE); L	did not advance						
Daniëlle Vriezema	-63 kg	—N/a	Ishii (BRA); L	did not advance							
Edith Bosch	-70 kg	—N/a	Ji (PRK); W	Traki (TUN); W	Howey (GBR); L	Bye		Krukower (ARG); W	Werbrouck (BEL); L	did not advance	

== Rowing ==
Men

Athlete	Event	Heats		Repechage		Semifinals		Final	
Athlete	Event	Time	Rank	Time	Rank	Time	Rank	Time	Rank
Gerard Egelmeers	Single sculls	7:05.48	2 R	7:04.25	1 SA/B	7:07.14	4 FB	6:55.29	7
Jochem Verberne; Dirk Lippits; Diederik Simon; Michiel Bartman	Quadruple sculls	5:54.57	2 Q	BYE		5:47.80	2 FA	5:47.91	2nd place, silver medalist(s)
Adri Middag; Peter van der Noort; Niels van der Zwan; Gerritjan Eggenkamp; Geert-Jan Derksen; Gijs Kind; Geert Cirkel; Nico Rienks; Merijn van Oijen	Coxed eight	5:56.42	3 R	5:44.91	4 FB	—N/a		5:36.63	8
Maarten van der Linden; Pepijn Aardewijn	Lightweight double sculls	6:38.62	3 R	6:36.99	2 SA/B	6:43.80	6 FB	6:40.18	12
Joris Trooster; Jeroen Spaans; Simon Kolkman; Robert van der Vooren	Lightweight coxless four	6:14.37	2 SA/B	BYE		6:03.25	5 FB	6:05.96	8

Women

Athlete	Event	Heats		Repechage		Semifinals		Final	
Athlete	Event	Time	Rank	Time	Rank	Time	Rank	Time	Rank
Pieta van Dishoeck; Eeke van Nes	Double sculls	7:10.55	2 R	7:08.98	1 FA	—N/a		7:00.36	2nd place, silver medalist(s)
Marloes Bolman; Femke Dekker	Coxless pair	7:47.99	5 R	7:40.00	4 FB	—N/a		7:27.22	10
Anneke Venema; Carin ter Beek; Nelleke Penninx; Pieta van Dishoeck; Eeke van Nes; Tessa Appeldoorn; Marieke Westerhof; Elien Meijer; Martijntje Quik	Coxed eight	6:11.29	1 FA	Bye		—N/a		6:09.39	2nd place, silver medalist(s)
Kirsten van der Kolk; Marit van Eupen	Women's lightweight double sculls	7:18.04	3 R	7:10.46	1 SA/B	7:07.16	2 FA	7:17.89	6

== Sailing ==
Women

Athlete	Event	Race											Net points	Rank
Athlete	Event	1	2	3	4	5	6	7	8	9	10	11	Net points	Rank
Margriet Matthijsse	Europe	1	~~24~~	~~19~~	2	6	5	3	19	1	1	1	39	2nd place, silver medalist(s)
Carolijn Brouwer; Alexandra Verbeek	470	11	~~16~~	8	9	10	6	5	RDG; 9.3	~~13~~	10	7	75.3	13

Open

Athlete	Event	Race											Net points	Rank
Athlete	Event	1	2	3	4	5	6	7	8	9	10	11	Net points	Rank
Serge Kats	Laser	~~29~~	3	10	7	5	10	~~31~~	19	3	9	6	72	4
Mark Neeleman; Jos Schrier	Star	5	7	7	~~11~~	8	4	~~15~~	6	1	4	8	50	6

Match racing

Athlete	Event	Race						Net points	Rank	Quarterfinal	Semifinal	Final / BM	Rank
Athlete	Event	1	2	3	4	5	6	Net points	Rank	Opposition Score	Opposition Score	Opposition Score	Rank
Dirk de Ridder; Roy Heiner; Peter van Niekerk	Solling	1	5	~~13~~	11	1	1	19	3 q	Germany; Denmark; Norway; New Zealand; Russia; L 2–3	Germany; L 1–3	Norway; L 1–3	4

== Shooting ==
Men

Athlete	Event	Preliminary		Final	
Athlete	Event	Points	Rank	Points	Rank
Dick Boschman	10 m air rifle	586	=31	Did not advance	
Gijs van Beek	Skeet	122 (1)	=12	Did not advance	
Hennie Dompeling	Skeet	122 (10)	=4 Q	146 (4)	4

== Swimming ==
Men

Athlete	Event	Heat		Semifinal		Final	
Athlete	Event	Time	Rank	Time	Rank	Time	Rank
Stefan Aartsen	100 m butterfly	53.81	16 Q	53.81	16'	did not Advance	
Stefan Aartsen	200 m butterfly	01:58.89	13	01:58.66	14	did not Advance	
Pieter van den Hoogenband	50 m freestyle	22.32	5 Q	22.11	2 Q	22.03	3rd place, bronze medalist(s)
Pieter van den Hoogenband	100 m freestyle	48.64	1 Q	47.84	1 Q	48.30	1st place, gold medalist(s)
Pieter van den Hoogenband	200 m freestyle	1:46.71	2 Q	1:45.35	1 Q	1:45.35	1st place, gold medalist(s)
Joris Keijzer	100 m butterfly	53.66	14 Q	53.33	9	did not start	
Johan Kenkhuis	50 m freestyle	22.61	12 Q	22.47	12	did not advance	
Johan Kenkhuis	100 m freestyle	49.93	18	did not Advance			
Benno Kuipers	200 m freestyle	02:17.03	23	did not Advance			
Marcel Wouda	100 m Breaststroke	01:02.00	8 Q	01:01.94	13	did not Advance	
Marcel Wouda	200 m individual medley	02:01.89	3 Q	02:01.40	4 Q	02:01.48	5
Martijn Zuijdweg	200 m breaststroke	1:50.37	19	did not Advance			
Klaas-Erik Zwering	200 m backstroke	2:00.94	14 Q	2:00.06	10	did not advance	
Mark Veens; Dennis Rijnbeek; Ewout Holst; Johan Kenkhuis	4 × 100 m freestyle relay	DSQ		—N/a		did not advance	
Johan Kenkhuis; Mark van der Zijden*; Marcel Wouda; Martijn Zuijdweg; Pieter van den Hoogenband	4 × 200 m freestyle relay	07:20.67	5	—N/a		07:12.70	3rd place, bronze medalist(s)
Joris Keizer; Mark Veens*; Marcel Wouda; Klaas-Erik Zwering; Pieter van den Hoogenband	4 × 100 m medley relay	3:40.10	6	—N/a		03:37.53	4

Women

Athlete	Event	Heat		Semifinal		Final	
Athlete	Event	Time	Rank	Time	Rank	Time	Rank
Madelon Baans	100 m breaststroke	01:10.47	16 Q	01:10.44	15	did not Advance	
Carla Geurts	200 m freestyle	2:00.60	11 Q	02:00.88	14	did not Advance	
Carla Geurts	400 m freestyle	4:10.86	8 Q	—N/a		4:12.36	7
Inge de Bruijn	50 m freestyle	24.46	1 Q	24.13 WR	1 Q	24.32	1st place, gold medalist(s)
Inge de Bruijn	100 m freestyle	54.77	1 Q	53.77 WR	1 Q	53.83	1st place, gold medalist(s)
Inge de Bruijn	100 m butterfly	57.60	1 Q	57.14 OR	1 Q	56.61 WR	1st place, gold medalist(s)
Wilma van Rijn	50 m freestyle	25.81	14 Q	25.87	13	did not Advance	
Wilma van Rijn	100 m freestyle	55.82	10 Q	55.28	6 Q	55.58	8
Brenda Starink	100 m backstroke	01:05.93	34	Did not Advance			
Kirsten Vlieghuis	400 m freestyle	4:11.87	10	—N/a		did not Advance	
Kirsten Vlieghuis	800 m freestyle	08:35.80	10	—N/a		did not Advance	
Inge de Bruijn; Chantal Groot*; Thamar Henneken; Wilma van Rijn; Manon van Rooijen	4 × 100 m freestyle relay	3:42.32	2 Q	—N/a		3:39.83 EU	2nd place, silver medalist(s)
Carla Geurts; Chantal Groot; Manon van Rooijen; Haike van Stralen	4 × 200 m freestyle relay	8:08.53 NR	11	—N/a		did not Advance	
Madelon Baans; Chantal Groot; Thamar Henneken; Brenda Starink	4 × 100 m medley relay	4:12.31	14	—N/a		did not Advance	

== Taekwondo ==
Athlete	Event	Round of 16	Quarterfinals	Semifinals	Repechage Quarterfinals	Repechage Semifinals	Final / BM	
Athlete	Event	Opposition Result	Opposition Result	Opposition Result	Opposition Result	Opposition Result	Opposition Result	Rank
Virginia Lourens	Women's −57 kg	Bye	Athanasopoulou (GRE); W 8–6	Ngan (VIE); L 6–9	Bye	Corsie (ITA); W 6–5	Tosun (TUR); L 5–7	4
Mirjam Mueskens	Women's −67 kg	O'Keefe (AUS); W 8–6	Kunkel (USA); W 6–2	Lee (KOR); L 1–4	Bye	Okamoto (JPN); L 5–7	Did not advance	

== Triathlon ==
At the inaugural Olympic triathlon competition, the Netherlands was represented by three men and three women. The nation's best result came from Wieke Hoogzaad at twenty-fifth place in the women's competition, while Dennis Looze was the last finisher in the men's race.

Athlete	Event	Swimming	Cycling	Running	Total	Rank
Wieke Hoogzaad	Women's triathlon	20:38.38	1:08:57.71	37:09.39	2:06:45.48	25
Silvia Pepels	Women's triathlon	20:37.38	1:06:53.90	39:33.73	2:07:05.01	26
Ingrid van Lubek	Women's triathlon	20:54.08	1:08:45.80	39:49.12	2:09:29.00	33
Eric van der Linden	Men's triathlon	18:22.19	59:10.40	36:59.45	1:54:32.04	42
Rob Barel	Men's triathlon	18:34.69	1:03:32.00	33:30.00	1:55:36.69	43
Dennis Looze	Men's triathlon	18:08.49	59:20.80	42:54.51	2:00:23.80	48

== Volleyball ==
=== Men ===
Team roster
- Peter Blangé
- Albert Cristina
- Martijn Dieleman
- Bas van de Goor
- Mike van de Goor
- Guido Görtzen
- Martin van der Horst
- Joost Kooistra
- Reinder Nummerdor
- Richard Schuil

- Head coach: Toon Gerbrands

Preliminary Round (Group A)

Pos	Team	Pld	W	L	Pts	SW	SL	SR	SPW	SPL	SPR	Qualification
1	Brazil	5	5	0	10	15	1	15.000	415	331	1.254	Quarterfinals
2	Netherlands	5	4	1	9	12	5	2.400	417	360	1.158	Quarterfinals
3	Cuba	5	3	2	8	9	7	1.286	383	335	1.143	Quarterfinals
4	Australia	5	2	3	7	6	10	0.600	327	374	0.874	Quarterfinals
5	Spain	5	1	4	6	7	12	0.583	404	444	0.910	
6	Egypt	5	0	5	5	1	15	0.067	309	411	0.752	

Date		Score		Set 1	Set 2	Set 3	Set 4	Set 5	Total
17 Sep	Cuba	0–3	Netherlands	22–25	20–25	23–25			65–75
19 Sep	Netherlands	3–0	Australia	25–19	25–17	25–15			75–51
21 Sep	Brazil	3–0	Netherlands	25–20	25–17	27–25			77–62
23 Sep	Egypt	1–3	Netherlands	21–25	11–25	33–31	20–25		85–106
25 Sep	Netherlands	3–1	Spain	25–18	25–17	24–26	25–21		99–82

Quarterfinals

Date		Score		Set 1	Set 2	Set 3	Set 4	Set 5	Total
27 Sep	Netherlands	2–3	Yugoslavia	21–25	25–18	18–25	32–30	15–17	111–115

5th–8th semifinals

Date		Score		Set 1	Set 2	Set 3	Set 4	Set 5	Total
28 Sep	Netherlands	3–0	Australia	25–20	25–15	25–21			75–56

5th place match

Date		Score		Set 1	Set 2	Set 3	Set 4	Set 5	Total
29 Sep	Brazil	0–3	Netherlands	21–25	20–25	22–25			63–75

== Water polo ==
=== Men ===
Team roster
- Marco Booij
- Bjørn Boom
- Bobbie Brebde
- Matthijs de Bruijn
- Arie van de Bunt
- Arno Havenga
- Bas de Jong
- Harry van der Meer
- Gerben Silvis
- Kimmo Thomas
- Eelco Uri
- Wim Vermeulen
- Niels Zuidweg

- Head coach: Johan Aantjes

Preliminary Round (Group B)

Pos	Team	Pld	W	D	L	GF	GA	GD	Pts	Qualification
1	FR Yugoslavia	5	4	1	0	41	22	+19	9	Quarter Finals
2	Croatia	5	4	1	0	42	30	+12	9	Quarter Finals
3	Hungary	5	3	0	2	49	39	+10	6	Quarter Finals
4	United States	5	2	0	3	42	39	+3	4	Quarter Finals
5	Netherlands	5	1	0	4	34	55	−21	2	
6	Greece	5	0	0	5	22	45	−23	0	

Source: LA84
Rules for classification: 1) Points; 2) Head-to-head points; 3) Head-to-head goal difference; 4) Head-to-head goals scored; 5) Goal difference.

23 September 2000; 12:00	FR Yugoslavia	9–1	Netherlands	Ryde Aquatic Leisure Centre; Referees: Moliner Molins (ESP), Turcotte (CAN)
23 September 2000; 12:00	Score by quarters: 3–0, 3–1, 2–0, 1–0			Ryde Aquatic Leisure Centre; Referees: Moliner Molins (ESP), Turcotte (CAN)

24 September 2000; 9:30	Hungary	16–8	Netherlands	Ryde Aquatic Leisure Centre; Referees: Prikhodko (KAZ), Melliar (RSA)
24 September 2000; 9:30	Score by quarters: 5–3, 3–2, 3–2, 5–1			Ryde Aquatic Leisure Centre; Referees: Prikhodko (KAZ), Melliar (RSA)

25 September 2000; 9:30	Netherlands	8–12	United States	Ryde Aquatic Leisure Centre; Referees: Afanasiev (RUS), Menendez Betancourt (CUB)
25 September 2000; 9:30	Score by quarters: 2–4, 3–3, 1–3, 2–2			Ryde Aquatic Leisure Centre; Referees: Afanasiev (RUS), Menendez Betancourt (CUB)

26 September 2000; 14:30	Greece	7–10	Netherlands	Ryde Aquatic Leisure Centre; Referees: Prikhodko (KAZ), Bower (AUS)
26 September 2000; 14:30	Score by quarters: 2–3, 2–3, 1–2, 2–2			Ryde Aquatic Leisure Centre; Referees: Prikhodko (KAZ), Bower (AUS)

27 September 2000; 14:30	Netherlands	7–11	Croatia	Ryde Aquatic Leisure Centre; Referees: Balfanbayev (KAZ), Melliar (RSA)
27 September 2000; 14:30	Score by quarters: 1–1, 1–4, 3–3, 2–3			Ryde Aquatic Leisure Centre; Referees: Balfanbayev (KAZ), Melliar (RSA)

Classification Round

Team	Pld	W	L	D	GF	GA	GD	Pts
Kazakhstan	3	2	0	1	23	18	+5	5
Greece	3	1	0	2	24	20	+4	4
Netherlands	3	1	1	1	19	20	−1	3
Slovakia	3	0	3	0	24	32	−8	0

29 September 2000; 10:45	Slovakia	8–9	Netherlands	Ryde Aquatic Leisure Centre; Referees: Bower (AUS), Moradi Shahpar (IRI)
29 September 2000; 10:45	Score by quarters: 1–1, 2–2, 3–4, 2–2			Ryde Aquatic Leisure Centre; Referees: Bower (AUS), Moradi Shahpar (IRI)

30 September 2000; 11:15	Netherlands	6–6	Greece	Ryde Aquatic Leisure Centre; Referees: Klaric (CRO), Csaszar (HUN)
30 September 2000; 11:15	Score by quarters: 0–2, 2–1, 1–3, 3–0			Ryde Aquatic Leisure Centre; Referees: Klaric (CRO), Csaszar (HUN)

1 October 2000; 10:15	Kazakhstan	6–4	Netherlands	Ryde Aquatic Leisure Centre; Referees: Menendez Betancourt (CUB), Margeta (SLO)
1 October 2000; 10:15	Score by quarters: 1–2, 2–0, 2–1, 1–1			Ryde Aquatic Leisure Centre; Referees: Menendez Betancourt (CUB), Margeta (SLO)

=== Women ===
Team roster
- Gillian van den Berg
- Hellen Boering
- Daniëlle de Bruijn
- Edmée Hiemstra
- Karin Kuipers
- Ingrid Leijendekker
- Patricia Megens
- Mirjam Overdam
- Heleen Peerenboom
- Karla Plugge
- Carla Quint
- Marjan op den Velde
- Ellen Bast

- Head coach: Jan Mensink

Preliminary Round Robin

Pos	Team	Pld	W	D	L	GF	GA	GD	Pts	Qualification
1	Australia (H)	5	4	0	1	35	20	+15	8	Semi Finals
2	United States	5	3	1	1	36	30	+6	7	Semi Finals
3	Netherlands	5	3	0	2	27	26	+1	6	Semi Finals
4	Russia	5	2	1	2	36	29	+7	5	Semi Finals
5	Canada	5	1	2	2	33	34	−1	4	
6	Kazakhstan	5	0	0	5	23	51	−28	0	

Source: LA84
Rules for classification: 1) Points; 2) Head-to-head points; 3) Head-to-head goal difference; 4) Head-to-head goals scored; 5) Goal difference.
(H) Hosts

16 September 2000; 19:15	Report	Netherlands	4–6	United States	Ryde Aquatic Centre; Referees: Angel Moliner Molins (ESP), Gyorgy Csaszar (HUN)
16 September 2000; 19:15	Report	Score by quarters: 0-2, 1-1, 2-1, 1-2			Ryde Aquatic Centre; Referees: Angel Moliner Molins (ESP), Gyorgy Csaszar (HUN)
16 September 2000; 19:15	Report	de Bruijn 2	Goals	Lorenz 2	Ryde Aquatic Centre; Referees: Angel Moliner Molins (ESP), Gyorgy Csaszar (HUN)

17 September 2000; 19:15	Report	Kazakhstan	6–8	Netherlands	Ryde Aquatic Centre; Referees: Dragan Rajevic (YUG), Juan Carlos Menéndez (CUB)
17 September 2000; 19:15	Report	Score by quarters: 2-2, 2-2, 1-2, 1-2			Ryde Aquatic Centre; Referees: Dragan Rajevic (YUG), Juan Carlos Menéndez (CUB)
17 September 2000; 19:15	Report	Leshchuk 3	Goals	two players 3	Ryde Aquatic Centre; Referees: Dragan Rajevic (YUG), Juan Carlos Menéndez (CUB)

18 September 2000; 13:00	Report	Netherlands	5–4	Australia	Ryde Aquatic Centre; Referees: Zeljko Klaric (CRO), Ahmet Erhan Tulga (TUR)
18 September 2000; 13:00	Report	Score by quarters: 2-1, 1-1, 0-2, 2-0			Ryde Aquatic Centre; Referees: Zeljko Klaric (CRO), Ahmet Erhan Tulga (TUR)
18 September 2000; 13:00	Report	de Bruijn 2	Goals	Higgins 3	Ryde Aquatic Centre; Referees: Zeljko Klaric (CRO), Ahmet Erhan Tulga (TUR)

19 September 2000; 19:15	Report	Netherlands	7–4	Canada	Ryde Aquatic Centre; Referees: Angel Moliner Molins (ESP), Renato Dani (ITA)
19 September 2000; 19:15	Report	Score by quarters: 3-0, 0-2, 2-2, 2-0			Ryde Aquatic Centre; Referees: Angel Moliner Molins (ESP), Renato Dani (ITA)
19 September 2000; 19:15	Report	two players 2	Goals	Begin 2	Ryde Aquatic Centre; Referees: Angel Moliner Molins (ESP), Renato Dani (ITA)

20 September 2000; 18:00	Report	Russia	6–3	Netherlands	Ryde Aquatic Centre; Referees: Ahmet Erhan Tulga (TUR), Gyorgy Csaszar (HUN)
20 September 2000; 18:00	Report	Score by quarters: 1-2, 1-1, 3-0, 1-0			Ryde Aquatic Centre; Referees: Ahmet Erhan Tulga (TUR), Gyorgy Csaszar (HUN)
20 September 2000; 18:00	Report	Konoukh 3	Goals	Kuipers 2	Ryde Aquatic Centre; Referees: Ahmet Erhan Tulga (TUR), Gyorgy Csaszar (HUN)

Semifinals

22 September 2000; 19:15	Report	United States	6–5	Netherlands	Ryde Aquatic Centre; Referees: Renato Dani (ITA), Patrick Clemencon (FRA)
22 September 2000; 19:15	Report	Score by quarters: 3-2, 1-3, 1-0, 1-0			Ryde Aquatic Centre; Referees: Renato Dani (ITA), Patrick Clemencon (FRA)
22 September 2000; 19:15	Report	two players 2	Goals	two players 2	Ryde Aquatic Centre; Referees: Renato Dani (ITA), Patrick Clemencon (FRA)

Bronze-medal match

23 September 2000; 20:00	Report	Russia	4–3	Netherlands	Sydney Olympic Aquatic Centre; Referees: Ahmet Erhan Tulga (TUR), Paraskevas Chasekioglou (GRE)
23 September 2000; 20:00	Report	Score by quarters: 0-2, 1-0, 1-1, 2-0			Sydney Olympic Aquatic Centre; Referees: Ahmet Erhan Tulga (TUR), Paraskevas Chasekioglou (GRE)
23 September 2000; 20:00	Report	Konoukh 2	Goals	Kuipers 2	Sydney Olympic Aquatic Centre; Referees: Ahmet Erhan Tulga (TUR), Paraskevas Chasekioglou (GRE)
