= Netherlands at the 1968 Summer Olympics =

- Flag of the Netherlands
- IOC code: NED (HOL used at these Games)
- NOC: Dutch Olympic Committee

in Mexico City
- Competitors: 107 (82 men, 25 women) in 11 sports
- Flag bearer: Fred van Dorp
- Officials: Chef d'mission: Ansco Dokkum
- Medals Ranked 17th: Gold 3 Silver 3 Bronze 1 Total 7

Summer Olympics appearances (overview)
- 1900; 1904; 1908; 1912; 1920; 1924; 1928; 1932; 1936; 1948; 1952; 1956; 1960; 1964; 1968; 1972; 1976; 1980; 1984; 1988; 1992; 1996; 2000; 2004; 2008; 2012; 2016; 2020; 2024; 2028

Other related appearances
- 1906 Intercalated Games

The Netherlands competed at the 1968 Summer Olympics in Mexico City, Mexico. 107 competitors, 82 men and 25 women, took part in 52 events in 11 sports.

== Medalists ==
=== Gold ===
- Ada Kok — Swimming, Women's 200m Butterfly
- Jan Wienese — Rowing, Men's Single Sculls
- Joop Zoetemelk, Jan Krekels, Fedor den Hertog, and René Pijnen — Cycling, Men's Team 100k Time Trial

=== Silver ===
- Jan Jansen and Leijn Loevesijn — Cycling, Men's 2000m Tandem
- Harry Droog and Leendert van Dis — Rowing, Men's Double Sculls
- Roderick Rijnders, Herman Suselbeek, and Hadriaan van Nes — Rowing, Men's Coxed Pairs

=== Bronze ===
- Maria Gommers — Athletics, Women's 800m

== Boxing ==
Men's Middleweight (– 75 kg)

- Jan van Ispelen
  1. First Round — Defeated Miguel Villugron (CHL), TKO-2
  2. Second Round — Lost to Mate Parlov (YUG), 1:4

== Cycling ==
Ten cyclists represented the Netherlands in 1968.

Individual road race

- René Pijnen
- Jan Krekels
- Harrie Jansen
- Joop Zoetemelk

Team time trial

- Fedor den Hertog
- Jan Krekels
- René Pijnen
- Joop Zoetemelk

Sprint

- Jan Jansen
- Leijn Loevesijn

1000m time trial

- Leijn Loevesijn

Tandem

- Jan Jansen
- Leijn Loevesijn

Individual pursuit

- Fedor den Hertog

Team pursuit

- Piet Hoekstra
- Henk Nieuwkamp
- Klaas Balk
- Joop Zoetemelk

== Diving ==
Women

Athlete	Event	Preliminary		Final			
Athlete	Event	Points	Rank	Points	Rank	Total	Rank
Mariët Dommers	3 m springboard	79.32	18	Did not advance			
Eljo Kuiler	3 m springboard	80.93	16	Did not advance			

== Swimming ==
Men

- Elt Drenth
- Dick Langerhorst
- Aad Oudt
- Johan Schans
- Bob Schoutsen

Women

- Toos Beumer
- Klenie Bimolt
- Nel Bos
- Cobie Buter
- Mirjam van Hemert
- Marjan Janus
- Ada Kok
- Hella Rentema
- Hennie Penterman
- Coby Sikkens
- Bep Weeteling

== Water polo ==
=== Men's team competition ===
- Preliminary Round (Group B)

- Drew with Italy (3-3)
- Lost to Yugoslavia (4-7)
- Lost to DDR (3-8)
- Defeated United Arabic Republic (6-3)
- Defeated Greece (9-5)
- Defeated Mexico (8-1)
- Defeated Japan (9-1)

- Classification Matches

- 5th-8th place: Lost to United States (3-6)
- 7th-8th place: Defeated Cuba (8-5) → 7th place

- Team Roster

- Bart Bongers
- Fred van Dorp
- Loet Geutjes
- André Hermsen
- Hans Hoogveld
- Evert Kroon
- Ad Moolhuijzen
- Hans Parrel
- Nico van der Voet
- Feike de Vries
- Hans Wouda
