= 2003 FINA Men's Water Polo World League =

- League: FINA Water Polo World League
- Sport: Water Polo
- Duration: 27 June – 24 August 2003
- Number of games: 19
- Number of teams: 8
- League champions: Hungary

FINA Men's Water Polo World League seasons
- ← 2002 2004 →

The 2003 FINA Men's Water Polo World League was the second edition of the annual event, organised by the world's governing body in aquatics, the FINA. After two preliminary rounds, held in São Paulo, Brazil and Budapest, Hungary, the Super Final was held in New York, United States from 22 August to 24 August 2003.

== Preliminary round ==
Semi-finals
Playoffs

=== Group A ===
- Held in São Paulo, Brazil

	Team	Points	G	W	D	L	GF	GA	Diff
1.	Italy	9	3	3	0	0	34	20	+14
2.	Greece	7	3	2	0	1	27	21	+6
3.	Netherlands	5	3	1	0	2	24	33	–9
4.	Brazil	3	3	0	0	3	19	30	–11

- 27 June 2003

Greece	10 – 6	Brazil
Italy	15 – 8	Netherlands

- 28 June 2003

Italy	10 – 6	Brazil
Greece	11 – 6	Netherlands

- 29 June 2003

Italy	9 – 6	Greece
Brazil	7 – 10	Netherlands

=== Group B ===
- Held in Budapest, Hungary

	Team	Points	G	W	D	L	GF	GA	Diff
1.	Hungary	9	3	3	0	0	37	22	+15
2.	Serbia and Montenegro	5	3	1	0	2	33	27	+6
3.	United States	5	3	1	0	2	22	34	–12
4.	Australia	5	3	1	0	2	26	35	–9

- 27 June 2003

United States	10 – 7	Australia
Hungary	11 – 7	Serbia and Montenegro

- 28 June 2003

Hungary	14 – 7	Australia
Serbia and Montenegro	15 – 4	United States

- 29 June 2003

Serbia and Montenegro	11 – 12	Australia
Hungary	12 – 8	United States

== Super Final ==
=== Play-Offs ===
- 22 August 2003

Greece	2 – 6	United States
Serbia and Montenegro	15 – 9	Netherlands

=== Semi-finals ===
- 23 August 2003

Hungary	6 – 5	United States
Italy	5 – 4	Serbia and Montenegro

=== Fifth-place match ===
- 23 August 2003

Netherlands	7 – 8	Greece

=== Bronze medal match ===
- 24 August 2003

United States	12 – 9	Serbia and Montenegro

=== Gold medal match ===
- 24 August 2003

Hungary	13 – 8	Italy

== Final rankings ==
RANK	TEAM
	Hungary
	Italy
	United States
4.	Serbia and Montenegro
5.	Greece
6.	Netherlands
7.	Australia
8.	Brazil

2003 FINA Men's World League

Hungary
First title

== Individual awards ==
=== Top scorers ===
RANK	TOP SCORERS	GOALS
1.	Tony Azevedo (USA)	12
2.	Aleksandar Sapic (SCG)	11
3.	Gerben Silvis (NED)	10
3.	Péter Biros (HUN)	10
5.	Bogdan Rath (ITA)	8
5.	Marco Booij (NED)	8
5.	Tamás Kásás (HUN)	8
5.	Thomas Whalan (AUS)	8
9.	Eelco Uri (NED)	7
9.	Francesco Postiglione (ITA)	7
9.	Gergely Kiss (HUN)	7
9.	Ioannis Thomakos (GRE)	7
9.	Norbert Madaras (HUN)	7
9.	Ryan Bailey (USA)	7
15.	Fabio Bencivenga (ITA)	6
15.	Felipe Perrone (BRA)	6
15.	Goran Fiorentini (ITA)	6
15.	Jesse Smith (USA)	6
15.	Predrag Jokic (SCG)	6
15.	Tamás Molnár (HUN)	6
15.	Vanja Udovicic (SCG)	6
15.	Vladimir Gojkovic (SCG)	6

== Statistics ==
- Total goals: 331
- Total matches: 19
- Goals per match: 17.4
- Total of scorers: 83
