= Aantjes =

Aantjes is a Dutch surname. Some notable people with the surname include:

- Johan Aantjes (born 1958), Dutch water polo player
- Willem Aantjes (1923–2015), Dutch politician
