= Lola Moolhuijzen =

Dutch water polo player (born 2004)

Personal information
- Nationality: Dutch
- Born: 17 August 2004 (age 21)
- Height: 179 cm (5 ft 10 in)
Medal record
Women's water polo
Representing the Netherlands
Olympic Games
Bronze medal – third place	2024 Paris	Team
World Championships
Gold medal – first place	2023 Fukuoka	Team
Bronze medal – third place	2022 Budapest	Team
European Championships
Gold medal – first place	2024 Eindhoven
Gold medal – first place	2026 Funchal
World League
Silver medal – second place	2023 Long Beach

Lola Moolhuijzen (born 17 August 2004) is a Dutch water polo player. She represented Netherlands at the 2024 Summer Olympics.

== Personal life ==
Her father Bas de Jong competed in the 1996 Summer Olympics and the 2000 Summer Olympics. Her grandfather Ad Moolhuijzen competed in the 1968 Summer Olympics.
