= John Jansen =

John Jansen may refer to:

== Sports ==
- John Jansen (rugby league) (born 1955), Australian rugby league footballer
- John Jansen (water polo) (born 1963), retired water polo player from the Netherlands
- Jon Jansen (born 1976), American football player

== Others ==
- John Jansen (politician) (1947–2026), Canadian politician, mayor of Chilliwack and member of British Columbia Legislative Assembly
- John Jansen (record producer) (born 1947), American recording engineer and music producer

== See also ==
- John Janssen (1835–1913), German-born American Roman Catholic bishop in Illinois
- Jonathan Janssen (born 1995), New Zealand basketball player
