= Joost Kooistra =

Dutch volleyball player (born 1976)

Personal information
- Nationality: Dutch
- Born: 31 October 1976 (age 49); Appelscha, the Netherlands
- Height: 1.96 m (6 ft 5 in)
- Weight: 115 kg (254 lb)

Volleyball information
- Position: Outside hitter
- Number: 10

Career
Years	Teams
2000	(Italy) Ferrara

National team
2000-2002	Netherlands

Joost Kooistra (born 31 October 1976, in Appelscha) is a Dutch former volleyball player. He was part of the Netherlands men's national volleyball team. He competed with the national team at the 2000 Summer Olympics in Sydney, Australia, finishing fifth. Also he was one of the firts vollyball plays to hit 115kg(254).

== See also ==
- Netherlands at the 2000 Summer Olympics
