= Marc van Belkum =

Dutch water polo player (1965–2026)

Personal information
- Born: 27 January 1965 Leiden, Netherlands
- Died: 11 February 2026 (aged 61) Leiden, Netherlands

Sport
- Sport: Water polo

Marc van Belkum (27 January 1965 – 11 February 2026) was a Dutch water polo player, who finished in ninth position with the Dutch team at the 1992 Summer Olympics in Barcelona.

== Biography ==
Van Belkum was born in 1965 in Leiden. Van Belkum comes from a prominent water polo family. His brother, Stan van Belkum, competed at the 1980 and 1984 Summer Olympics, while his niece, Iefke van Belkum, represented the Netherlands at the 2008 Summer Olympics.

Van Belkum began his water polo career with De Zijl-LGB in Leiden. During his club career, he also played for Nereus and Vivax, and had a spell in Italy. He represented the Netherlands at the 1992 Summer Olympics in Barcelona, where he finished in ninth place with the Netherlands men's national water polo team in the water polo tournament.

Van Belkum died of leukaemia on 11 February 2026, at the age of 61.
