= Roald van Noort =

Dutch water polo player (born 1960)

Personal information
- Born: March 2, 1960 (age 66) Elst, Netherlands

Sport
- Sport: Water polo

Roald Max Antoine van Noort born on March 2, 1960 is a former water polo player from the Netherlands, who finished in sixth position with the Dutch National Men's Team at the 1984 Summer Olympics in Los Angeles.
