= Arno Havenga =

Dutch water polo player

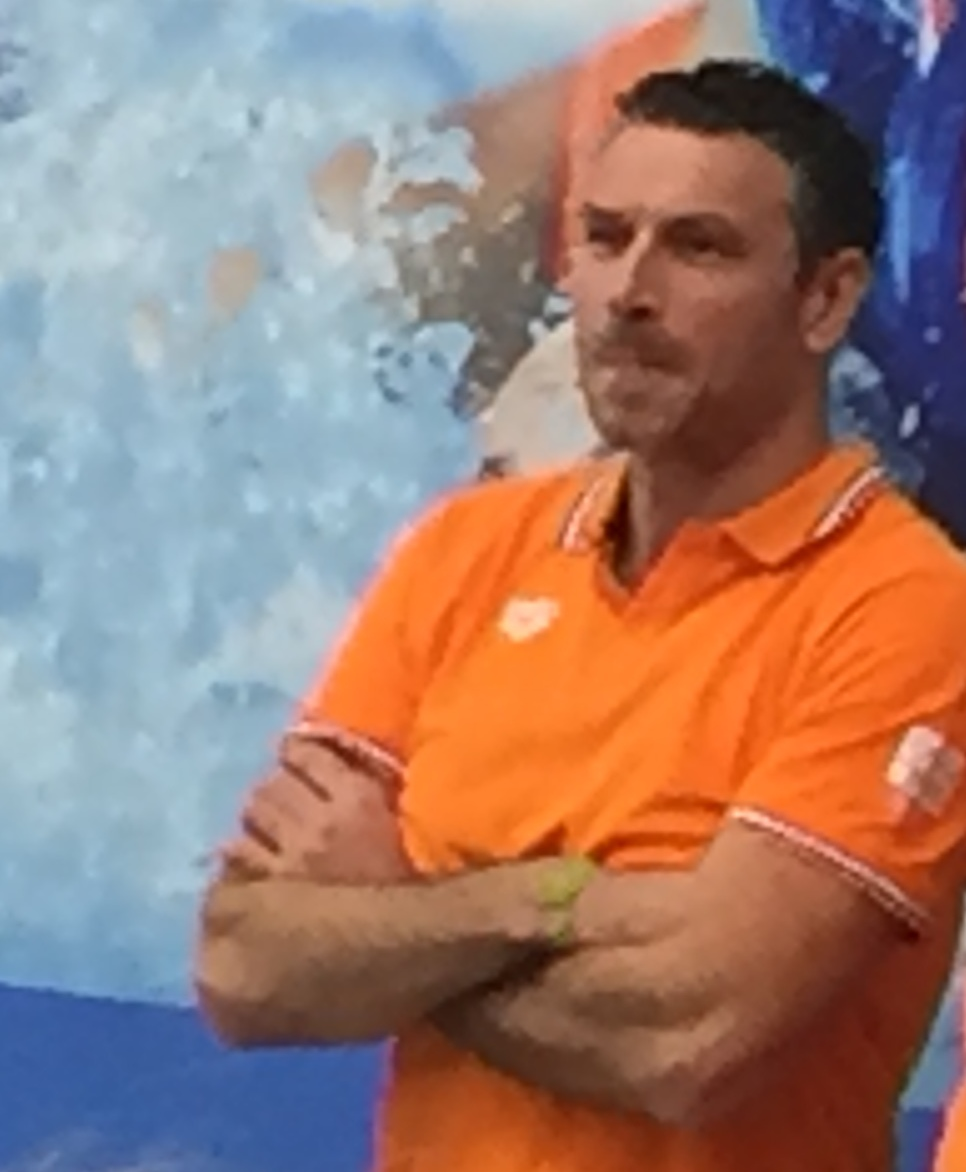
- Havenga in 2016

Personal information
- Nationality: Dutch
- Born: 14 November 1974 (age 51) Rotterdam, Netherlands
- Height: 1.95 m (6 ft 5 in)
- Weight: 100 kg (220 lb)

Sport
- Sport: Water polo

Arno Havenga (born 14 November 1974) is a Dutch male former water polo player and current coach. He was a member of the Netherlands men's national water polo team. He competed with the team at the 1996 Summer Olympics and 2000 Summer Olympics. He was also part of the national team at the 2001 Men's European Water Polo Championship and 2003 Men's European Water Polo Championship.

After his career he became water polo coach of the Netherlands women's national water polo team. First as an assistant to head coach Robin van Galen who coached the team to Olympic gold in 2008. After Havenga took over as head coach, the team won silver at the 2015 World Aquatics Championships and two silver medals at the European championships of 2014 and 2016. However, at the Qualification tournament of the 2016 Summer Olympics in own country, the team was not able to qualify for the 2016 Summer Olympics.

He was the head coach of the Dutch women's team at the 2020 Summer Olympics in Tokyo, where the team finished in sixth place.
