= Hans Nieuwenburg =

Dutch water polo player (born 1968)

Personal information
- Born: 5 June 1968 (age 58) Koudekerk aan den Rijn, Netherlands

Sport
- Sport: Water polo

Johannes "Hans" Nieuwenburg (born 5 June 1968) is a former water polo defender from the Netherlands, who participated in two Summer Olympics. In 1992 he finished in ninth position with the Dutch National Men's Team, in 1996 he was the captain of the squad that finished in tenth spot, under the guidance of head coach and former international Hans van Zeeland.

Nieuwenburg works as a freelance sportswriter, and is the chief editor of the Dutch water polo magazine called ManMeer!
