= Anton Heiden =

Dutch water polo player (born 1960)

Personal information
- Born: July 4, 1960 (age 66) Barendrecht, Netherlands

Sport
- Sport: Water polo

Anton Heiden (born July 4, 1960) is a former water polo player from the Netherlands.

Heiden participated once with the Dutch national water polo team at the Olympics, finishing in sixth position at the 1984 Summer Olympics in Los Angeles. He played at various clubs, amongst them: ZPB Barendrecht and Zian Den Haag. After his career as a player he became a water polo coach. Currently he's the head coach of ZDHC Den Haag.
