= Kristian Lipar =

Croatian water polo player

Personal information
- Nationality: Croatian
- Born: 7 March 1990 (age 36) Zagreb, Croatia
- Height: 2.00 m (6 ft 7 in)
- Weight: 105 kg (231 lb)

Sport
- Country: Croatia
- Sport: Water polo
- Club: VK Solaris

Kristian Lipar (born 7 March 1990) is a Croatian water polo player. He is a former player of VK Solaris. He is 6 ft 7 in (2.00 m) tall and weighs 231 lb (105 kg).
