= Ton Schmidt =

Dutch water polo player (born 1948)

Personal information
- Born: January 31, 1948 (age 77); Amsterdam, Netherlands

Sport
- Sport: Water polo

Antoon "Ton" Schmidt (born January 31, 1948) is a former water polo player from the Netherlands, who finished in seventh position with the Netherlands men's national water polo team at the 1972 Summer Olympics in Munich.
