= Piet Ooms =

Dutch swimmer

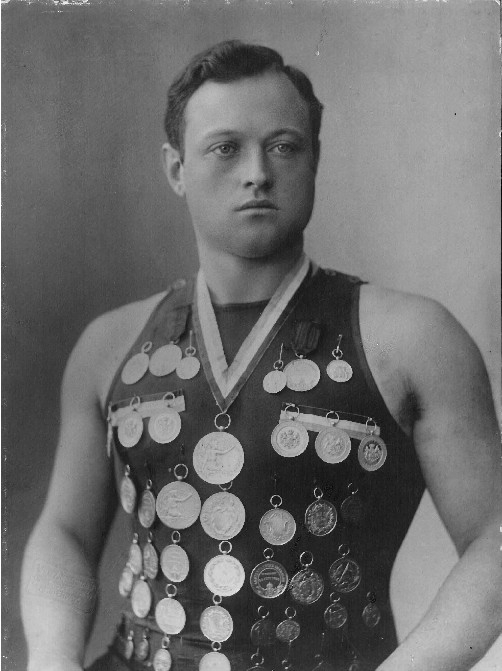
- Ooms, c. 1905

Personal information
- Full name: Pieter Lodewijk Ooms
- National team: Netherlands
- Born: 11 December 1884; Amsterdam
- Died: 14 February 1961 (aged 76); Amsterdam

Sport
- Event(s): Freestyle swimming Water polo

Pieter ("Piet") Lodewijk Ooms (11 December 1884, Amsterdam – 14 February 1961, Amsterdam) was a Dutch freestyle swimmer and water polo player who competed in the 1908 Summer Olympics.

He participated in the 1500 metre freestyle competition, but was eliminated in the first round.

Also he was part of the Dutch water polo team, which finished fourth in the 1908 tournament.
