= Gerrit Wormgoor =

Dutch water polo player (born 1940)

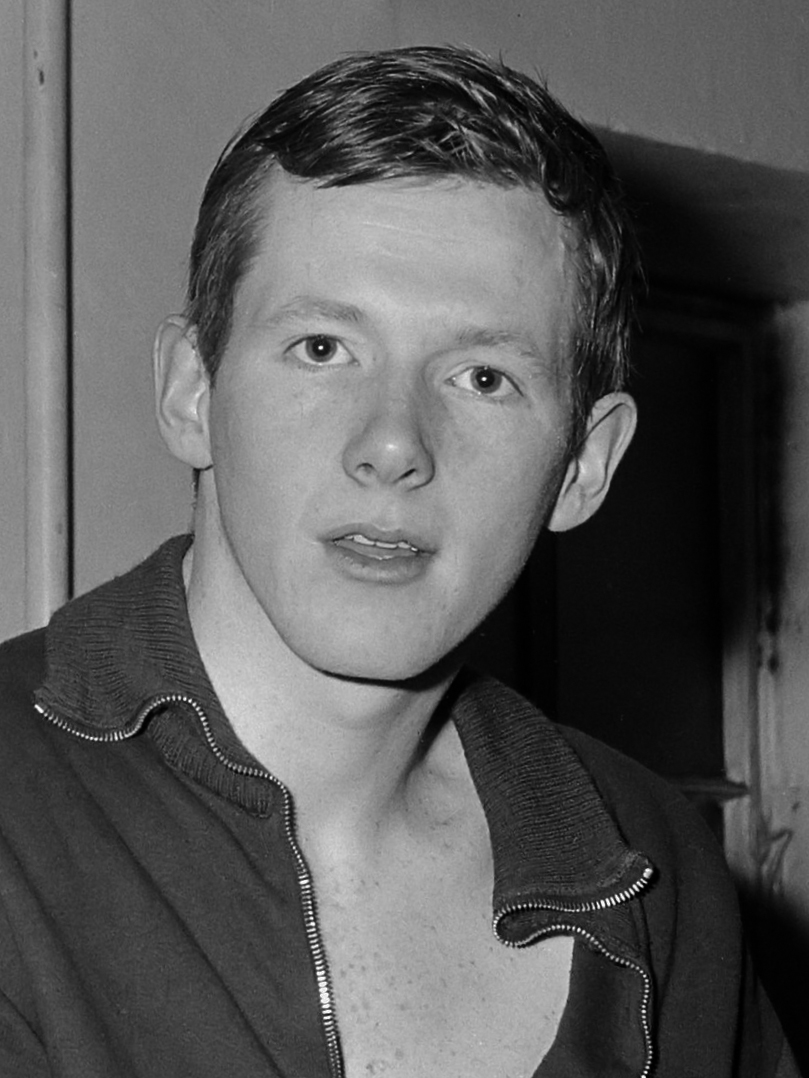
- Wormgoor in 1964

Personal information
- Born: 29 July 1940 (age 84); Utrecht, Netherlands

Sport
- Sport: Water polo

Gerrit Hendrik Wormgoor (29 July 1940) is a former water polo player from the Netherlands, who finished in eighth position with the Dutch Men's Team at the 1964 Summer Olympics in Tokyo.
