= Robert Havekotte =

Dutch water polo player (born 1967)

Personal information
- Born: January 25, 1967 (age 58); De Bilt, Netherlands

Sport
- Sport: Water polo

Robert Jan Havekotte (born January 25, 1967) is a retired water polo player from the Netherlands, who finished in ninth position with the Dutch team at the 1992 Summer Olympics in Barcelona.

As of 2008 he is a board member at UNIBA Partners, an independent network of insurance brokers.

== Personal life ==
Havekotte is the father of Mike Havekotte, who is a professional footballer.
