= Hans Muller (water polo) =

Dutch sportsman (1937–2015)

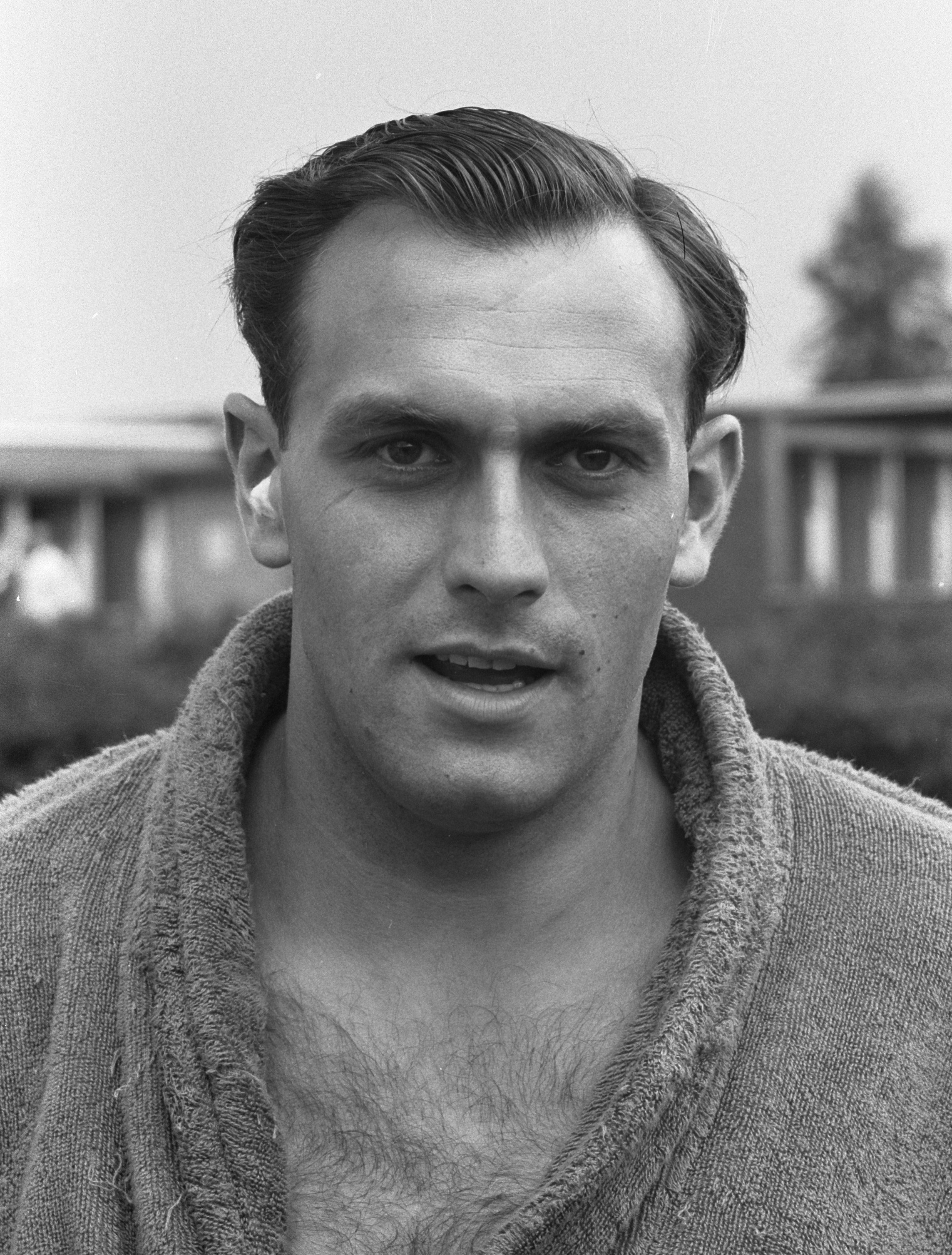
- Hans Muller in 1961

Personal information
- Born: 24 January 1937 Amsterdam, Netherlands
- Died: 1 July 2015 (aged 78) Haarlem, Netherlands

Sport
- Sport: Water polo
- Club: De Dolfijn, Amsterdam; AZ&PC Amersfoort

Johan Arnoldus "Hans" Muller (24 January 1937 – 1 July 2015) was a Dutch water polo player. He competed in the 1960 and 1964 Summer Olympics and finished eighth on both occasions. He was the Dutch team manager at the 1972 Olympics and a board member of the Dutch Olympic Committee from May 1985 to May 1989. He owned a dress store, which for many years provided clothing for the Dutch Olympic team.
