= Nico Landeweerd =

Dutch water polo player (born 1954)

Personal information
- Born: 3 April 1954 (age 72) Hilversum, Netherlands

Sport
- Sport: Water polo
Medal record
Representing Netherlands
Olympic Games
Bronze medal – third place	1976 Montreal	Team competition

Nicolaas Albertus Adrianus "Nico" Landeweerd (born 3 April 1954) is a former water polo player from the Netherlands, who participated in three Summer Olympics. At his debut, at the 1976 Summer Olympics in Montreal, he won the bronze medal with the Dutch team. In 1980 and 1984 Landeweerd finished in sixth position with the Holland squad.

== See also ==
- List of Olympic medalists in water polo (men)
