= Matthijs de Bruijn =

Dutch water polo player (born 1977)

Personal information
- Nationality: Dutch
- Born: 27 May 1977 (age 48) Barendrecht, Netherlands

Sport
- Sport: Water polo

Matthijs de Bruijn (born 27 May 1977) is a Dutch water polo player. He competed in the men's tournament at the 2000 Summer Olympics.
