= Bert Brinkman =

Dutch water polo player (born 1968)

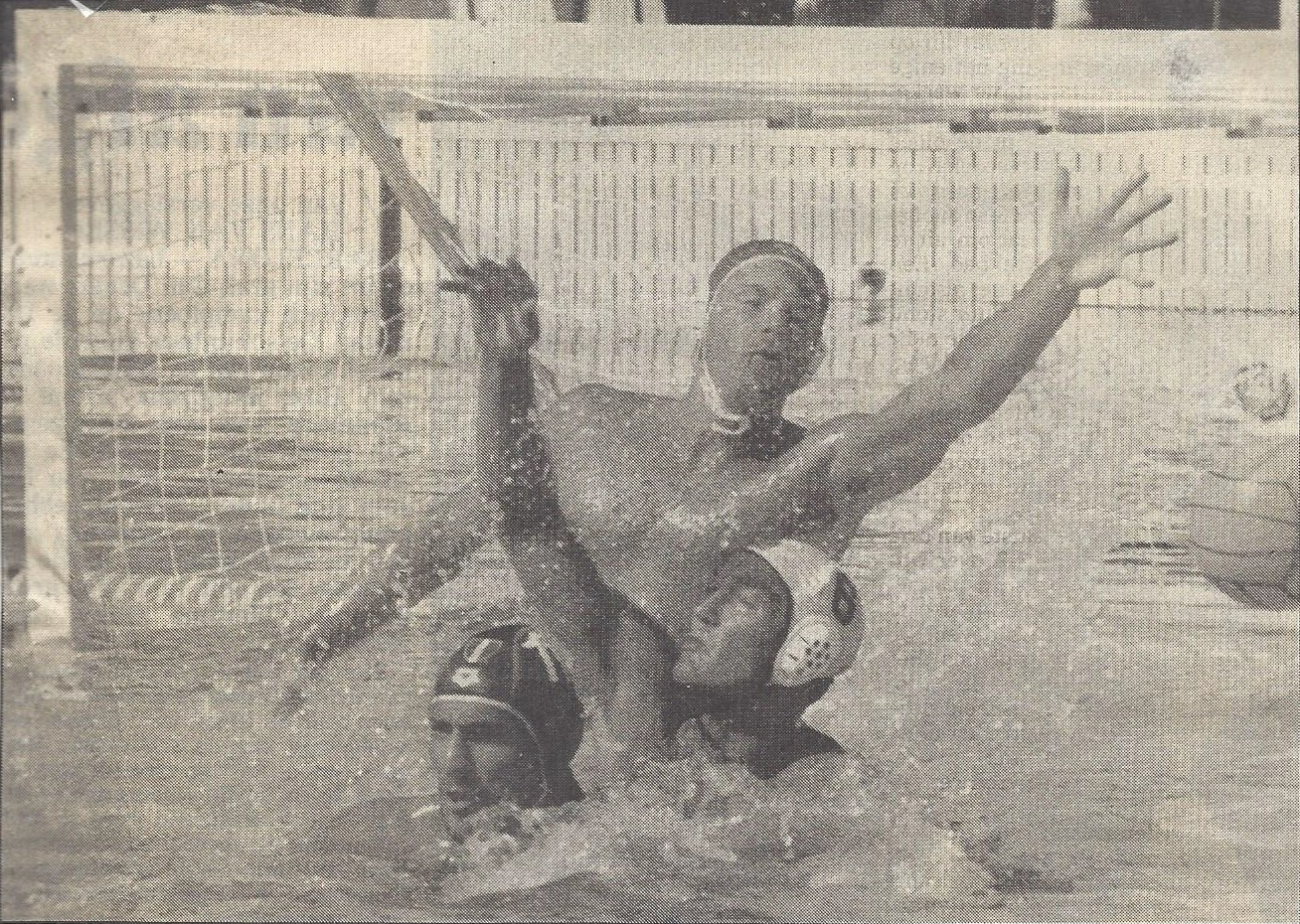

Personal information
- Born: 4 April 1968 (age 58) Nijverdal, Netherlands

Sport
- Sport: Water polo

Bert Brinkman (born 4 April 1968) is a retired water polo player from the Netherlands, who finished in ninth position with the Dutch team at the 1992 Summer Olympics in Barcelona.

== See also ==
- Netherlands men's Olympic water polo team records and statistics
- List of men's Olympic water polo tournament goalkeepers
