= Bram Leenards =

Dutch water polo player (born 1940)

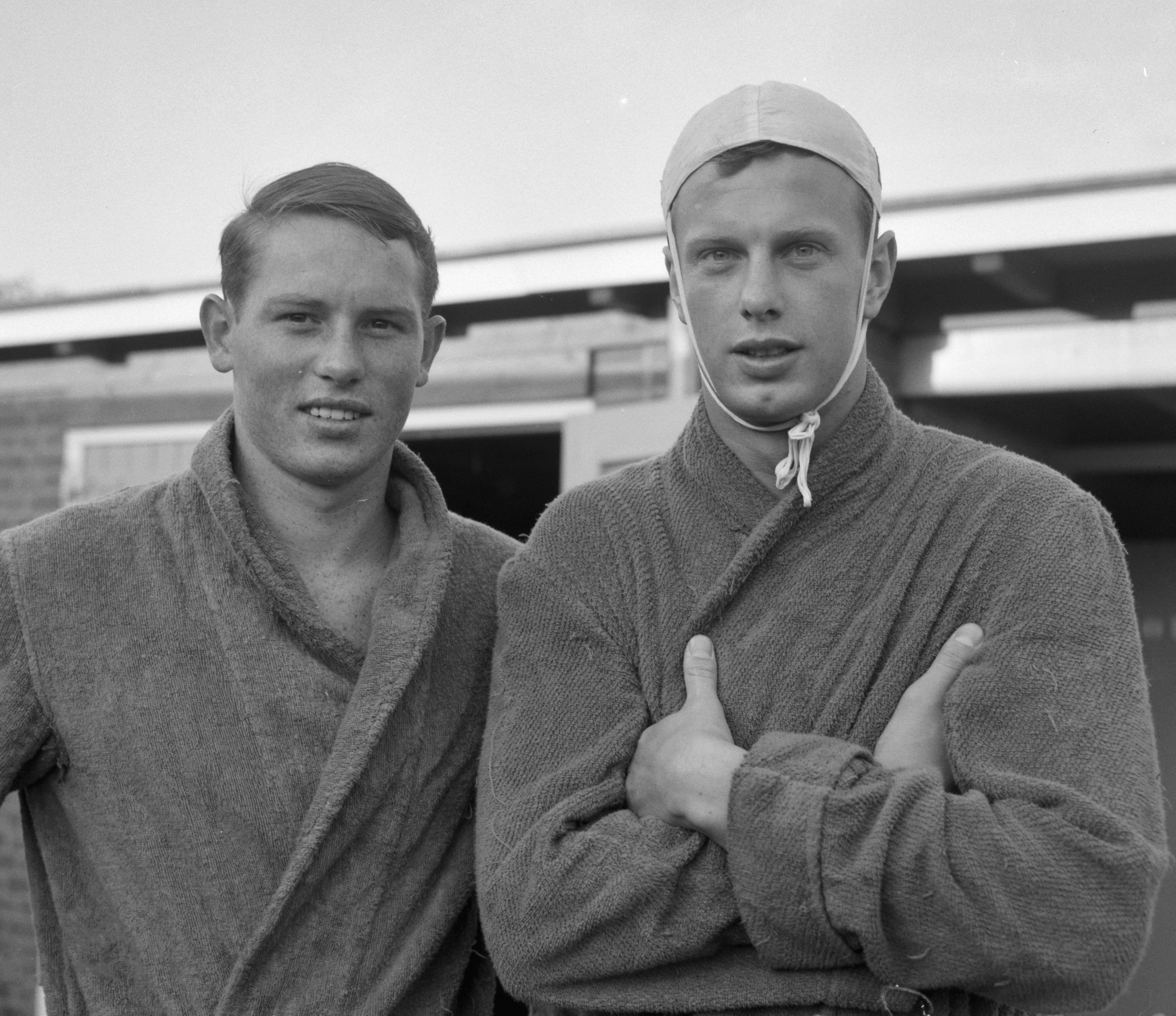
- Leenards (left) with teammate Harro Ran in 1961

Personal information
- Born: 14 June 1940 (age 86) The Hague, the Netherlands
- Height: 187 cm (6 ft 2 in)
- Weight: 75 kg (165 lb)

Sport
- Sport: Water polo
- Club: HZ ZIAN, The Hague

Abraham "Bram" Cornelis Willem Leenards (born 14 June 1940) is a retired Dutch water polo player. He was part of the Dutch teams that placed eighth at the 1960 and 1964 Summer Olympics.
