= Rik Toonen =

Dutch water polo player (born 1954)

Personal information
- Born: 21 May 1954 (age 72) Arnhem, Netherlands

Sport
- Sport: Water polo
Medal record
Representing Netherlands
Olympic Games
| Bronze medal – third place | 1976 Montreal | Team competition |

Hendrik Adriaan "Rik" Toonen (born 21 May 1954) is a former water polo player from the Netherlands, who won the bronze medal with the Dutch Men's Team at the 1976 Summer Olympics in Montreal, Canada.

== See also ==
- List of Olympic medalists in water polo (men)
