= Ben Kniest =

Dutch water polo player (1927–1992)

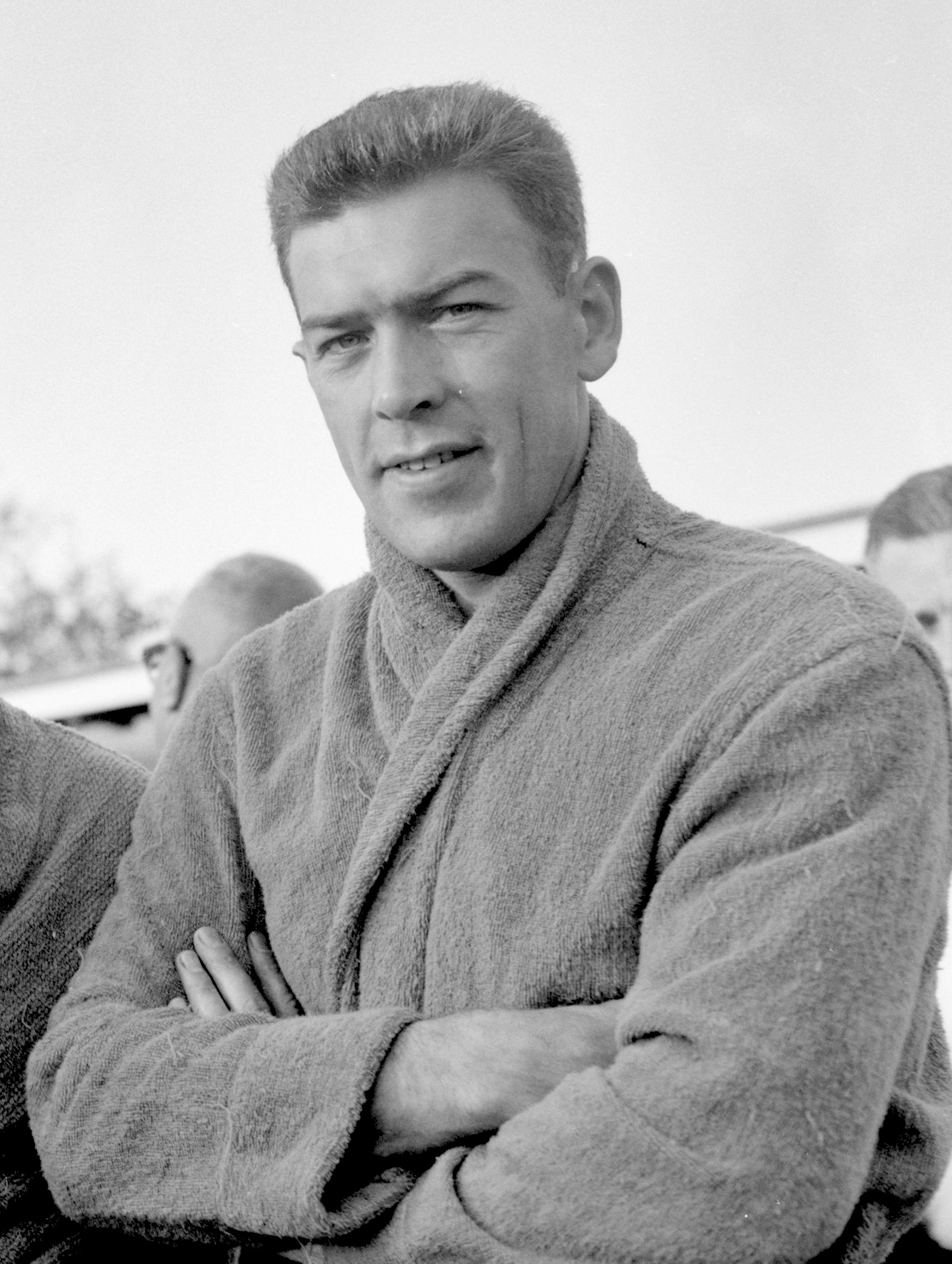
- Ben Kniest in 1961

Personal information
- Birth name: Lambertus Gerhardus Kniest
- Nationality: Dutch
- Born: 27 August 1927; Arnhem, the Netherlands
- Died: 18 July 1992 (aged 64); Arnhem, the Netherlands
- Height: 1.86 m (6 ft 1 in)
- Weight: 90 kg (200 lb)

Sport
- Sport: Water polo
- Club: Neptunus, Arnhem

Lambertus "Ben" Gerhardus Kniest (27 August 1927 – 18 July 1992) was a water polo player from the Netherlands, who competed at the 1960 and 1964 Summer Olympics; in both games he finished in eighth position with the Dutch team.

== See also ==
- Netherlands men's Olympic water polo team records and statistics
- List of men's Olympic water polo tournament goalkeepers
