= Wim van Spingelen =

Dutch water polo player (born 1938)

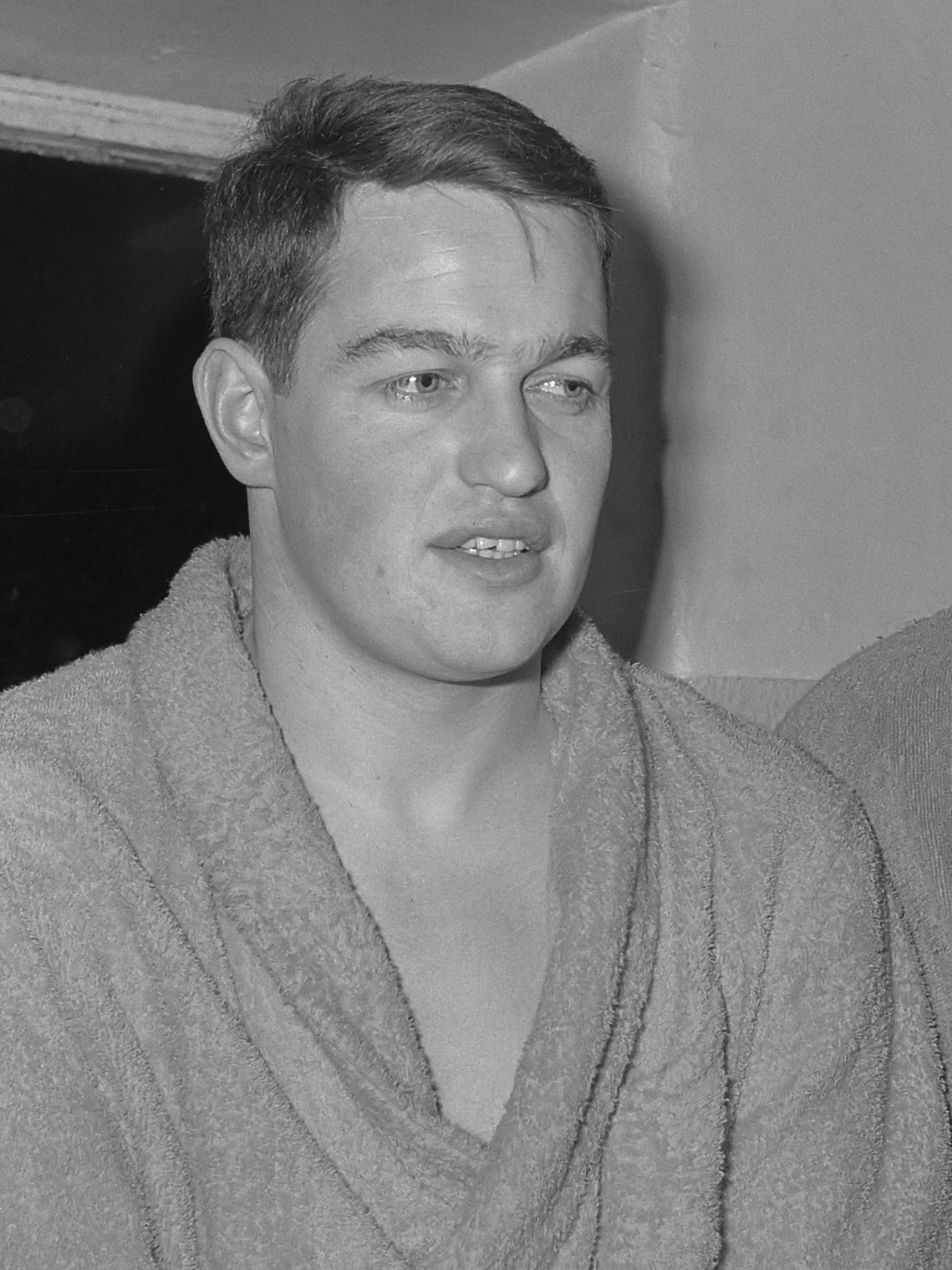
- van Spingelen in 1964

Personal information
- Born: 9 February 1938 (age 87); Utrecht, Netherlands

Sport
- Sport: Water polo

Willem ("Wim") van Spingelen (9 February 1938) is a former water polo player from the Netherlands, who was a member of the Dutch Men's National Team that finished in eighth position at the 1964 Summer Olympics in Tokyo, Japan.
