= Johan Rühl =

Dutch water polo player (1885–1972)

Personal information
- Born: 9 May 1885; Amsterdam, Netherlands
- Died: 4 December 1972 (aged 87); Hilversum, Netherlands

Sport
- Sport: Water polo

Johan Hendrik Willem Rühl (9 May 1885 – 4 December 1972) was a Dutch water polo player who competed in the 1908 Summer Olympics. He was the goalkeeper of the Dutch water polo team, which finished fourth in the 1908 tournament.

== See also ==
- Netherlands men's Olympic water polo team records and statistics
- List of men's Olympic water polo tournament goalkeepers
