= Alex Boegschoten =

Dutch water polo player (born 1956)

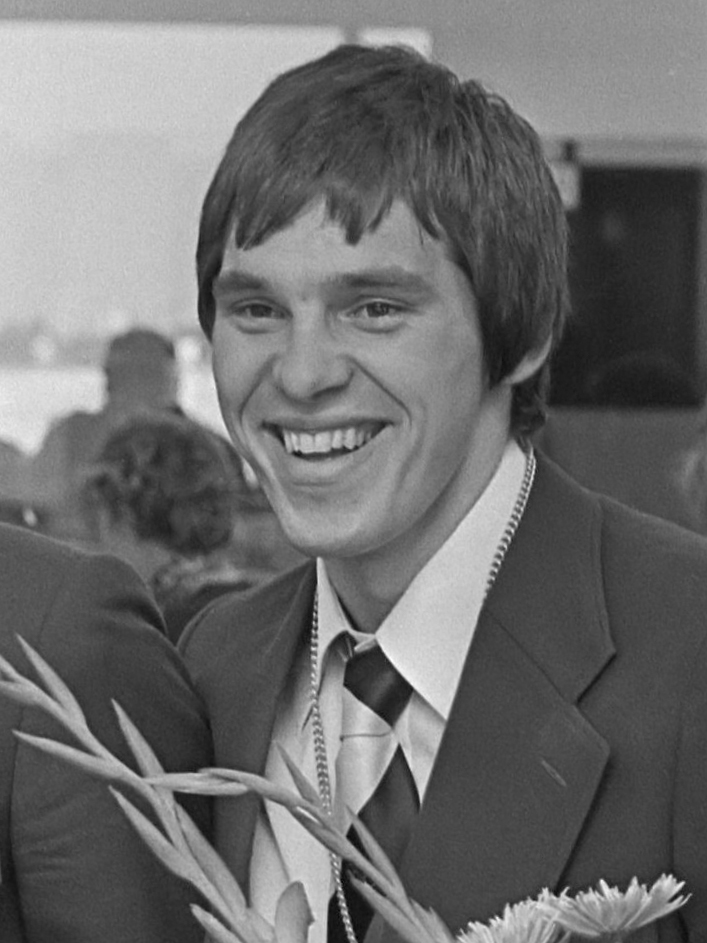
- Alex Boegschoten (1976)

Personal information
- Full name: Alexander Boegschoten
- Born: 15 July 1956 (age 69) Hilversum, Netherlands
Medal record
Men's water polo
Representing the Netherlands
Olympic Games
Bronze medal – third place	1976 Montreal	Team competition

Alexander Boegschoten (born 15 July 1956 in Hilversum) is a former water polo player from the Netherlands, who won the bronze medal with the Dutch Men's Team at the 1976 Summer Olympics in Montreal, Quebec, Canada.

== See also ==
- Netherlands men's Olympic water polo team records and statistics
- List of Olympic medalists in water polo (men)
- List of men's Olympic water polo tournament goalkeepers
