= Bas de Jong =

Dutch water polo player (born 1973)

Personal information
- Nationality: Dutch
- Born: 11 September 1973 (age 51); Willemstad, Curaçao

Sport
- Sport: Water polo

Bas de Jong (born 11 September 1973) is a Dutch water polo player. He competed at the 1996 Summer Olympics and the 2000 Summer Olympics. In 2014 De Jong became assistant coach of the Dutch Women's water polo team. De Jong's daughter Lola Moolhuijzen competed in the 2024 games.
