= Eelco Uri =

Dutch water polo player (born 1973)

Personal information
- Nationality: Netherlands
- Born: 5 December 1973 (age 52) Rhenen, the Netherlands
- Height: 1.92 m (6 ft 4 in)
- Weight: 84 kg (185 lb)

Sport
- Sport: Water polo
- Position: Driver/Wing
- Number: 9

Senior clubs
- Years: Team
- –: VZC Veenendaal
- –: Polar Bears Ede
- –: AZ&PC Amersfoort
- –: Al Qadsia (Kuwait)
- –: Olympic Nice (France)
- –: NOC Chania (Greece)
- –: SC Schaffhausen (Switzerland)
National team
- Years: Team
- 1994-2004: Netherlands

Eelco Uri (born 5 December 1973) is a Dutch former water polo player. He was a member of the Netherlands men's national water polo team. He competed with the team at the 1994 and 2001 World Championships; the 1995, 1997, 1999, 2001, and 2003 European Championships; and the 1996 Summer Olympics and 2000 Summer Olympics. He played 256 tests.
