= Jan Bultman =

Dutch water polo player (born 1942)

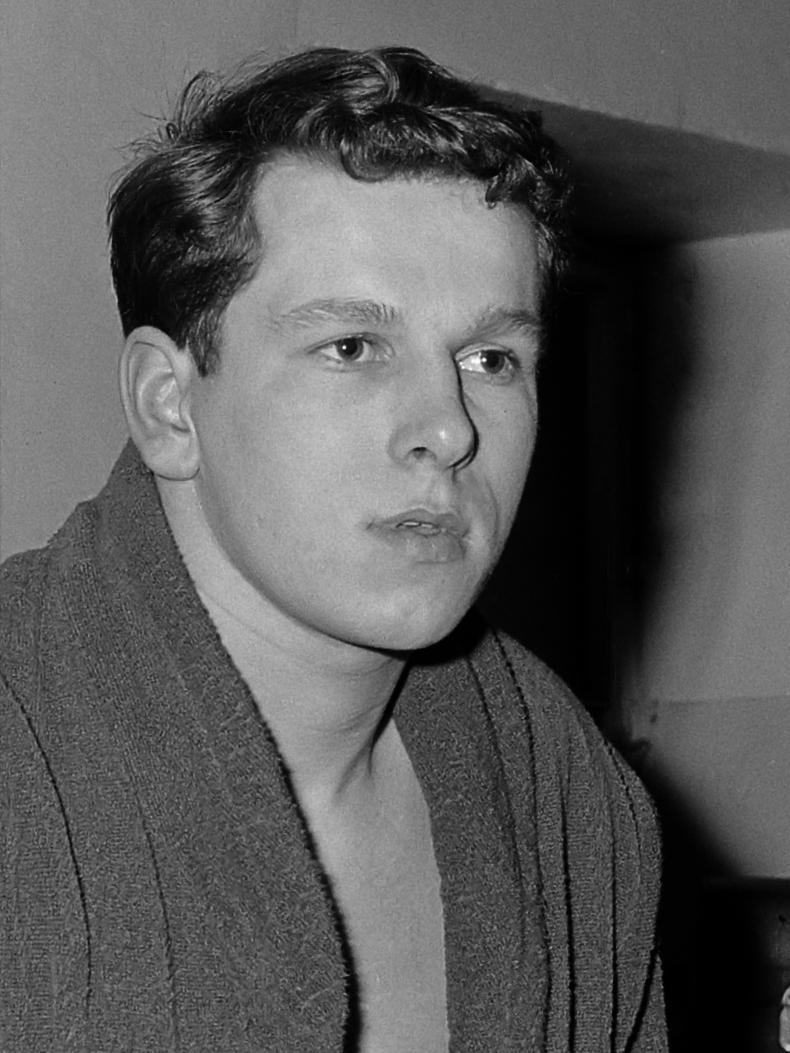
- Bultman in 1964

Personal information
- Born: 26 May 1942 (age 82); Deventer, Overijssel, Netherlands

Sport
- Sport: Water polo

Jan Arend Bultman (born 26 May 1942) is a former water polo player from The Netherlands. He was a member of the Dutch Men's National Team that finished in eighth position at the 1964 Summer Olympics in Tokyo, Japan.
