= Koos Issard =

Dutch water polo player (born 1971)

Personal information
- Born: February 28, 1971 (age 54); Hilversum, Netherlands

Sport
- Sport: Water polo

Jacobus "Koos" Issard (born February 28, 1971) is a former water polo player from the Netherlands, who finished in ninth position with the Dutch team at the 1992 Summer Olympics in Barcelona. Four years later, Issard was a member of the squad that was tenth in the final rankings in Atlanta, Georgia.
