= Joeri Stoffels =

Dutch water polo player (born 1973)

Personal information
- Nationality: Dutch
- Born: 11 July 1973 (age 51); Amstelveen, Netherlands

Sport
- Sport: Water polo

Joeri Stoffels (born 11 July 1973) is a Dutch water polo player. He competed in the men's tournament at the 1996 Summer Olympics.
