= John Scherrenburg =

Dutch water polo player (born 1963)

Personal information
- Born: October 23, 1963 (age 61); Ede, Netherlands

Sport
- Sport: Water polo

John Scherrenburg (born October 23, 1963) is a retired water polo player from the Netherlands. He finished in ninth position with the Dutch team at the 1992 Summer Olympics in Barcelona.
