= Hans Smits =

Dutch water polo player (born 1956)

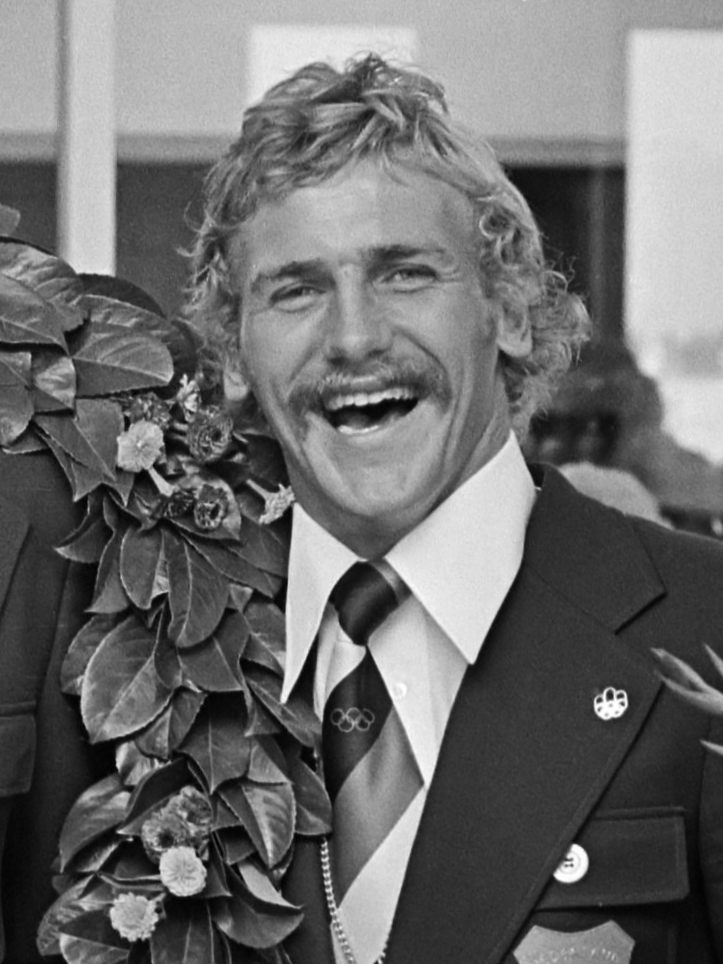

Personal information
- Born: January 24, 1956 (age 70) Den Helder, North Holland, Netherlands

Sport
- Sport: Water polo
Medal record
Representing Netherlands
Olympic Games
Bronze medal – third place	1976 Montreal	Team competition

Hans Karel Daniël Smits (born January 24, 1956) is a former water polo player from The Netherlands, who won the bronze medal with the Dutch Men's Team at the 1976 Summer Olympics in Montreal, Quebec, Canada.

== See also ==
- List of Olympic medalists in water polo (men)
