= Dick Nieuwenhuizen =

Dutch water polo player (born 1957)

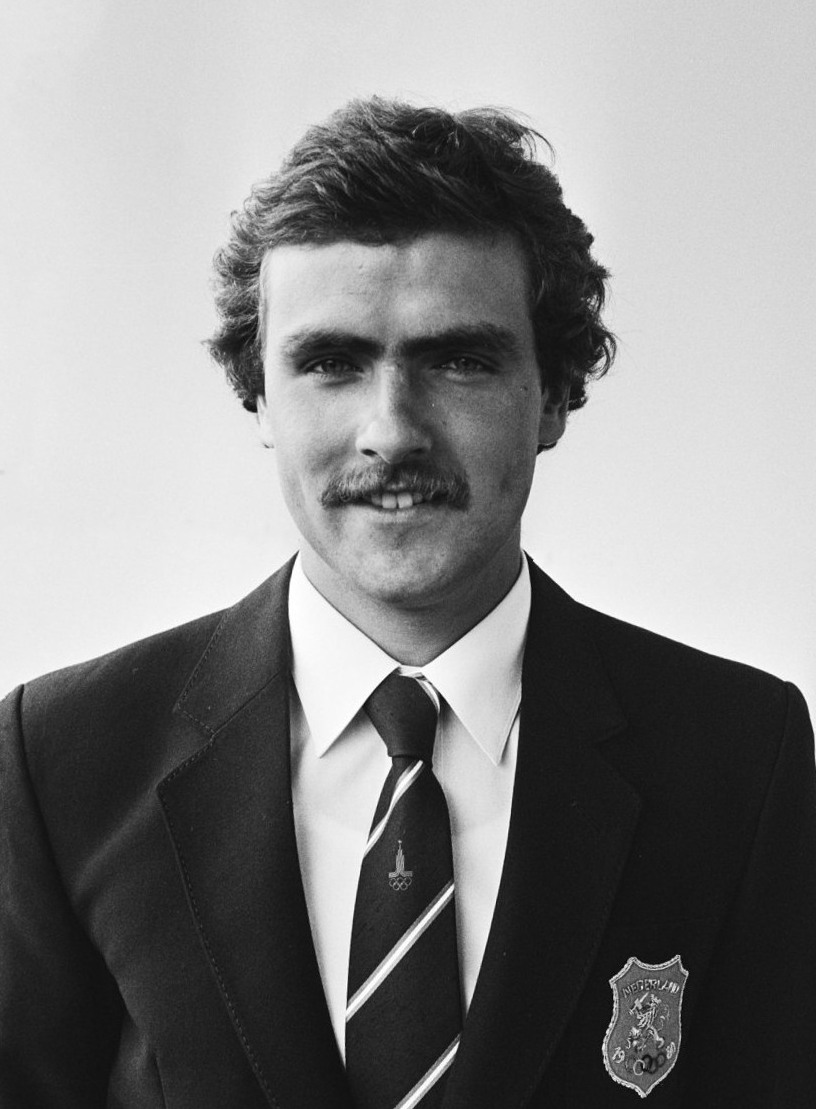
- Dick Nieuwenhuizen in 1980

Personal information
- Born: 6 April 1957 (age 68); Hilversum, the Netherlands
- Height: 1.88 m (6 ft 2 in)
- Weight: 78 kg (172 lb)

Sport
- Sport: Water polo
- Club: De Robben, Hilversum

Theodorus Anton "Dick" Nieuwenhuizen (born 6 April 1957) is a retired Dutch water polo player. He competed at the 1980 and 1984 Olympics and finished in sixth place at both Games. At the end of the 1990s he briefly coached the Dutch team.
