= Jan Hulswit =

Dutch water polo player (1885–1932)

Personal information
- Born: April 9, 1885; Apeldoorn, Netherlands
- Died: May 2, 1932 (aged 47); Willemstad, Netherlands Antilles

Sport
- Sport: Water polo

Jan Frederik Hulswit (April 9, 1885 – May 2, 1932) was a Dutch water polo player who competed in the 1908 Summer Olympics.

Hulswit was born in Apeldoorn. He was a member of the Dutch water polo team, which finished fourth in the 1908 tournament.

He died in Willemstad, Netherlands Antilles.
