= Mart Bras =

Dutch water polo player (born 1950)

Personal information
- Born: August 8, 1950 (age 76) Rotterdam, Netherlands

Sport
- Sport: Water polo

Martinus "Mart" Rokes Bras (born 8 August 1950) is a former water polo player from The Netherlands. He finished in seventh position with the Dutch Men's Water Polo Team at the 1972 Summer Olympics in Munich. Later on Bras became an international water polo referee.
