= Jan Wagenaar (water polo) =

Dutch water polo player (born 1965)

Personal information
- Born: July 7, 1965 (age 61) Amersfoort, Netherlands

Sport
- Sport: Water polo

Jan Theodorus Wagenaar (born July 7, 1965) is a retired water polo player from the Netherlands. He finished in ninth position with the Dutch team at the 1992 Summer Olympics in Barcelona.
