= Wim van de Schilde =

Dutch water polo player (born 1948)

Personal information
- Born: November 4, 1948 (age 76); The Hague, Netherlands

Sport
- Sport: Water polo

Willem ("Wim") van de Schilde (born 4 November 1948) is a former water polo player from The Netherlands, who finished in seventh position with the Dutch Men's Water Polo Team at the 1972 Summer Olympics in Munich.

== See also ==
- Netherlands men's Olympic water polo team records and statistics
- List of men's Olympic water polo tournament goalkeepers
