= Ad Moolhuijzen =

Dutch water polo player (born 1943)

Personal information
- Born: 1 April 1943 (age 82); Arnhem, Gelderland, Netherlands

Sport
- Sport: Water polo

Adrianus ("Ad") Theodorus Moolhuijzen (born 1 April 1943) is a former water polo player from The Netherlands, who finished in seventh position with the Netherlands men's national water polo team at the 1968 Summer Olympics in Mexico City, Mexico.
