= Hans van Zeeland =

Dutch water polo player (born 1954)

Personal information
- Born: 4 May 1954 (age 72) Arnhem, Netherlands

Sport
- Sport: Water polo
Medal record
Representing Netherlands
Olympic Games
Bronze medal – third place	1976 Montreal	Team competition

Johannes Hendrikus Jacques "Hans" van Zeeland (born 4 May 1954) is a former water polo player from the Netherlands, who won the bronze medal with the Dutch National Team at the 1976 Summer Olympics in Montreal. In 1980 Van Zeeland finished in sixth position with the Holland squad. Sixteen years later he was the head coach of the Dutch Men's National Team at the 1996 Summer Olympics in Atlanta, United States.

== See also ==
- List of Olympic medalists in water polo (men)
