= Loet Geutjes =

Dutch water polo player (born 1943)

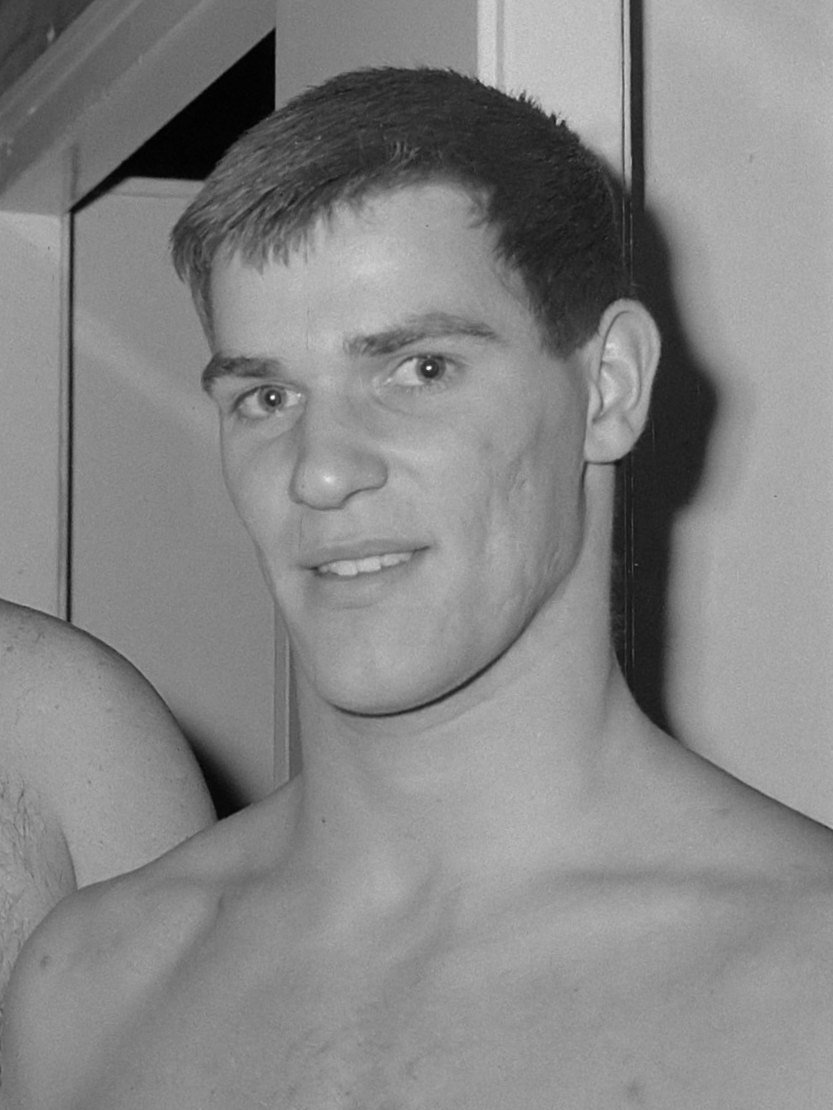
- Geutjes in 1964

Personal information
- Born: August 12, 1943 (age 81); Amersfoort, Utrecht, Netherlands

Sport
- Sport: Water polo

Louis ("Loet") Geutjes (born August 12, 1943) is a former water polo player from The Netherlands, who finished in seventh position with the Dutch Men's Team at the 1968 Summer Olympics in Mexico City, Mexico. After an active career as water polo player, Geutjes became a successful swimming coach, first with AZ&PC Amersfoort, and currently with De Otters Het Gooi Bussum. He has trained and coached several athletes that went on to perform at international level, such as the twins Mildred and Marianne Muis, and Chantal Groot.
