= Marco Booij =

Dutch water polo player (born 1973)

Personal information
- Nationality: Dutch
- Born: 10 April 1973 (age 52); Barendrecht, Netherlands

Sport
- Sport: Water polo

Marco Booij (born 10 April 1973) is a Dutch water polo player. He competed in the men's tournament at the 2000 Summer Olympics.
