= Gerben Silvis =

Dutch water polo player (born 1976)

Personal information
- Nationality: Dutch
- Born: 6 January 1976 (age 50) Barendrecht, Netherlands

Sport
- Sport: Water polo

Gerben Silvis (born 6 January 1976) is a Dutch water polo player. He competed in the men's tournament at the 2000 Summer Olympics.
