= Remco Pielstroom =

Dutch water polo player (born 1965)

Personal information
- Born: April 8, 1965 (age 60); Amsterdam, Netherlands

Sport
- Sport: Water polo

Remco Eric Pielstroom (born 8 April 1965) is a former water polo player from the Netherlands, who participated in two Summer Olympics. In 1984 he finished in sixth position with the Dutch team. Eight years later in Barcelona, Pielstroom gained the ninth spot in the final rankings with Holland.
