= Hans Hoogveld =

Dutch water polo player (1947–2024)

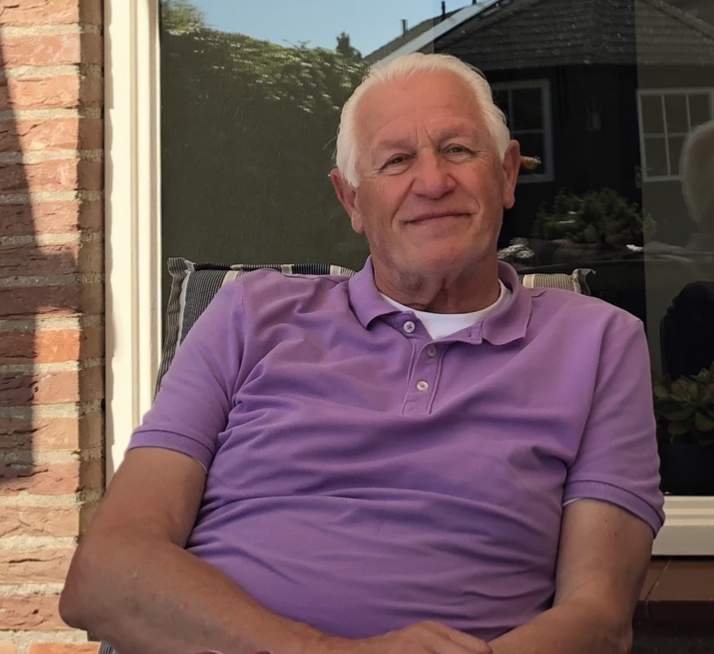

Personal information
- Born: 21 May 1947; Amersfoort, Utrecht, Netherlands
- Died: 29 June 2024 (aged 77)

Sport
- Sport: Water polo

Johannes "Hans" Bernardus Everardus Hoogveld (21 May 1947 – 29 June 2024) was a Dutch water polo player, who competed in two consecutive Summer Olympics for his native country, starting in 1968. In Mexico City as well as in Munich he finished in seventh position with the Dutch Men's Water Polo Team.

Hoogveld died on 29 June 2024, at the age of 77.

== Sources ==
- Dutch Olympic Committee
