= Bjørn Boom =

Dutch water polo player (born 1975)

Personal information
- Nationality: Dutch
- Born: 17 December 1975 (age 50) Amsterdam, Netherlands

Sport
- Sport: Water polo

Bjørn Boom (born 17 December 1975) is a Dutch water polo player. He competed in the men's tournament at the 2000 Summer Olympics.

== See also ==
- Netherlands men's Olympic water polo team records and statistics
