= Gijs van der Leden =

Dutch water polo player (born 1967)

Personal information
- Born: 11 May 1967 (age 58) Gouda, Netherlands

Sport
- Sport: Water polo

Gijsbert Johan ("Gijs") van der Leden (born 11 May 1967) is a retired water polo player from the Netherlands, who finished in ninth place with the Dutch team at the 1992 Summer Olympics in Barcelona.
