= Kimmo Thomas =

Dutch water polo player (born 1974)

Personal information
- Nationality: Dutch
- Born: 4 March 1974 (age 51); Alphen aan den Rijn, Netherlands

Sport
- Sport: Water polo

Kimmo Thomas (born 4 March 1974) is a Dutch water polo player. He competed in the men's tournament at the 2000 Summer Olympics.
