= Johan Aantjes =

Dutch water polo player (born 1958)

Personal information
- Born: May 6, 1958 (age 68) Utrecht, Netherlands

Sport
- Sport: Swimming
- Strokes: Water polo

Johan Aantjes (born May 6, 1958, in Utrecht) is a former water polo player from the Netherlands, who finished in sixth position with the Dutch national men's team at the 1984 Summer Olympics in Los Angeles, California. Later on, from 1999 until 2003, Aantjes was the head coach of the Dutch Men's Squad. He resigned in the spring of 2003 after the Netherlands finished in a disappointing eleventh position at the 2003 Men's European Water Polo Championship in Slovenia, but returned to the job in 2006.
