= Niels Zuidweg =

Dutch water polo player (born 1974)

Personal information
- Nationality: Dutch
- Born: 23 July 1974 (age 50); The Hague, Netherlands

Sport
- Sport: Water polo

Niels Zuidweg (born 23 July 1974) is a Dutch water polo player. He competed in the men's tournament at the 2000 Summer Olympics.
