= Eric Noordegraaf =

Dutch water polo player (born 1960)

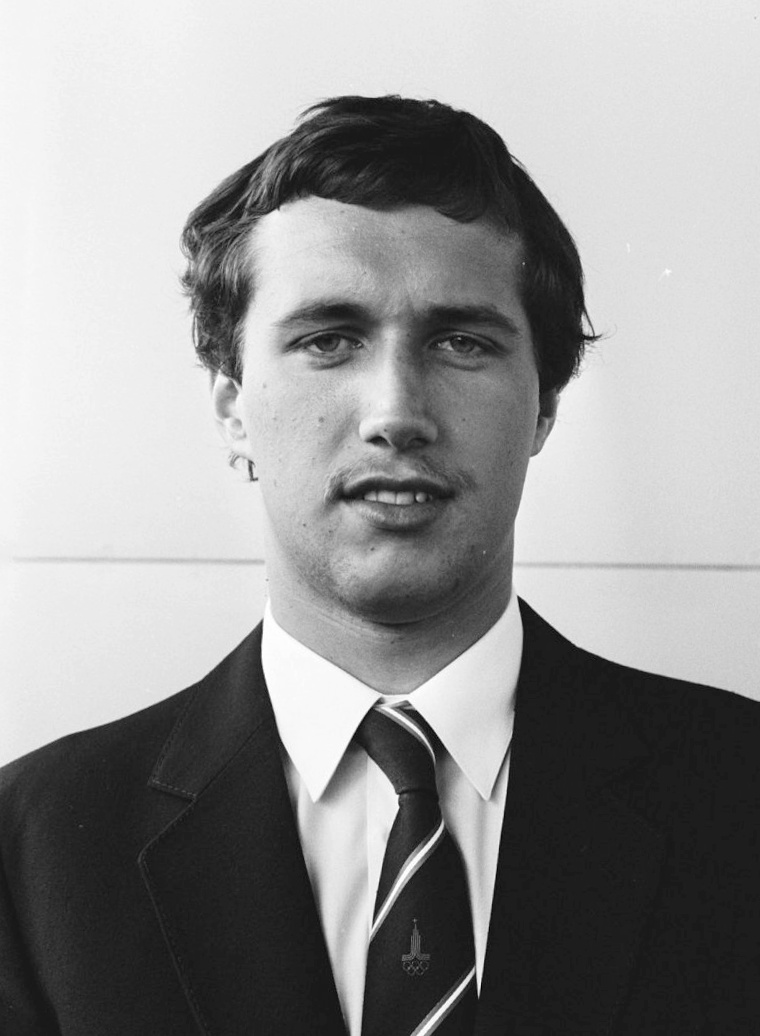
- Eric Noordegraaf in 1980

Personal information
- Born: 21 April 1960; Gouda, the Netherlands
- Height: 1.90 m (6 ft 3 in)
- Weight: 84 kg (185 lb)

Sport
- Sport: Water polo
- Club: AZC, Alphen aan den Rijn

Eric Noordegraaf (born 21 April 1960) is a Dutch former water polo player who participated in two Summer Olympics. On both occasions, at the 1980 Summer Olympics in Moscow and the 1984 Summer Olympics in Los Angeles, he finished in sixth position with the Dutch National Men's Team. At the end of the 1990s, he was the head coach of the Dutch squad for a short period of time. From 2000 to 2003, he was the head coach of the team AZC Alphen aan de Rijn. During these years, AZC won the national championships. From 2004, he opened the first waterpolo school in the Netherlands, called the Waterpolo Opleidingscentrum (WOC). Eric Noordegraaf is the director of the waterpolo school.
