= Ed van Es =

Dutch water polo player (born 1959)

Personal information
- Born: June 28, 1959 (age 65); Wageningen, Netherlands

Sport
- Sport: Water polo

Eduard ("Ed") van Es (born 28 June 1959) is a former water polo player from the Netherlands, who finished in sixth position with the Dutch National Men's Team at the 1984 Summer Olympics in Los Angeles.
