= Feike de Vries =

Dutch water polo player (born 1943)

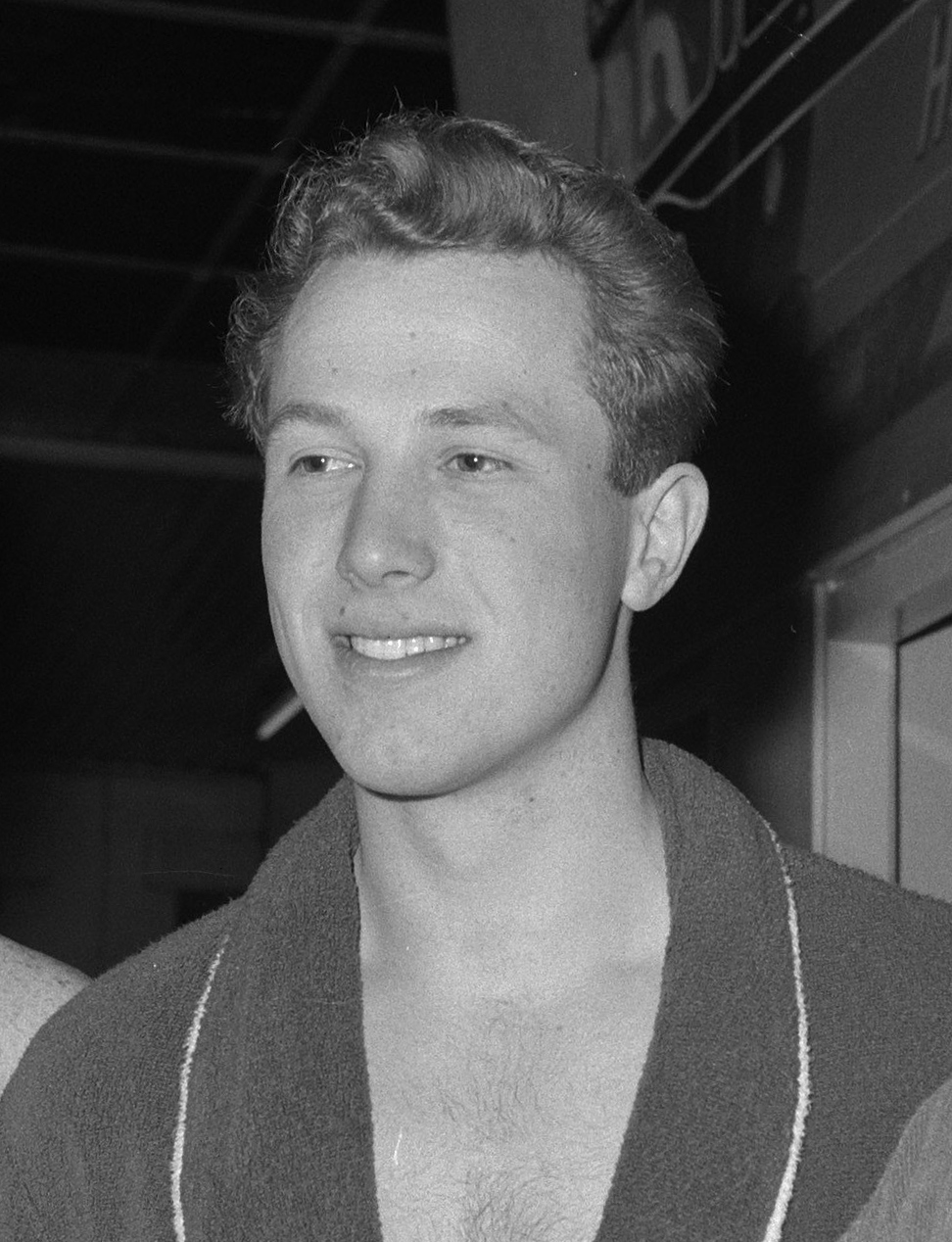
- Feike de Vries in 1964

Personal information
- Born: 1 January 1943 (age 82); Amersfoort, the Netherlands
- Height: 186 cm (6 ft 1 in)
- Weight: 80 kg (176 lb)

Sport
- Sport: Water polo
- Club: Neptunus, Arnhem

Feike de Vries (born 1 January 1943) is a retired Dutch water polo player. He was part of the Dutch team that placed seventh at the 1968 Summer Olympics in Mexico City.

== See also ==
- Netherlands men's Olympic water polo team records and statistics
- List of men's Olympic water polo tournament goalkeepers
