= Bart Bongers =

Dutch water polo player (1946–2007)

Personal information
- Born: October 6, 1946; Arnhem, Gelderland, Netherlands
- Died: May 3, 2007 (aged 60)

Sport
- Sport: Water polo

Bart Bongers (October 6, 1946 – May 3, 2007) was a water polo player from The Netherlands who finished in seventh position with the Dutch Men's Team at the 1968 Summer Olympics in Mexico City, Mexico.
