= Ruud Misdorp =

Dutch water polo player (born 1952)

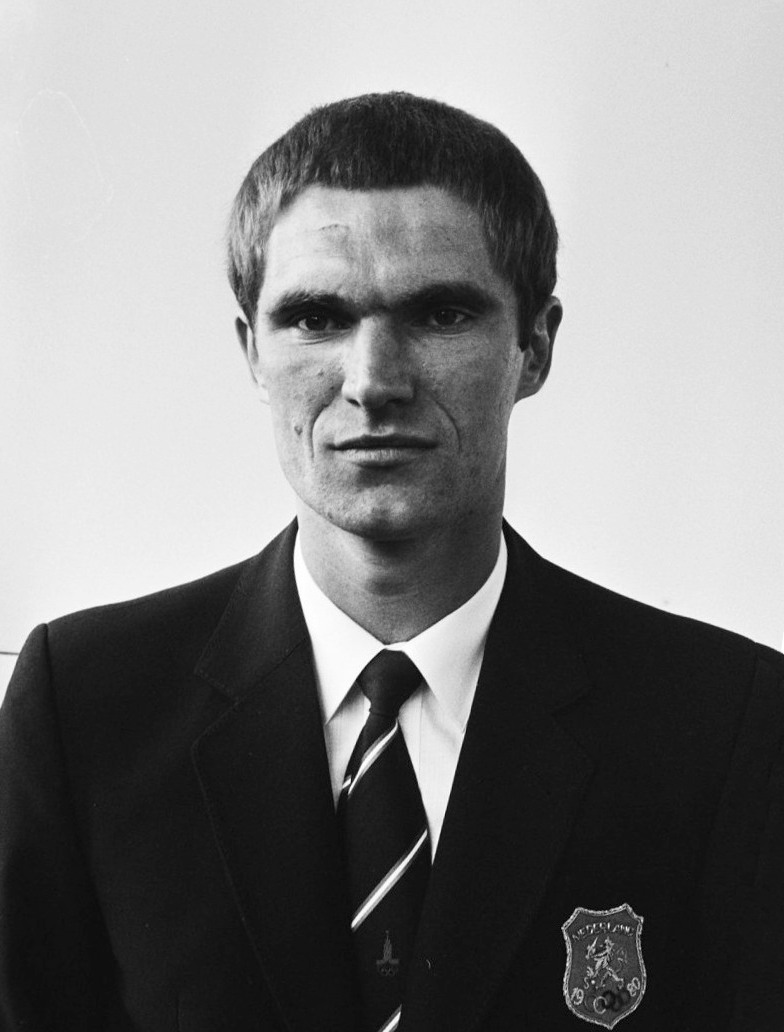
- Ruud Misdorp in 1980

Personal information
- Full name: Rudolf Antonius Misdorp
- Born: 3 July 1952 (age 73) The Hague, the Netherlands
- Height: 1.98 m (6 ft 6 in)
- Weight: 100 kg (220 lb)

Sport
- Sport: Water polo
- Club: ZIAN, The Hague

Rudolf Antonius "Ruud" Misdorp (born 3 July 1952) is a former water polo player from the Netherlands, who participated in two Summer Olympics. On both occasions, at the 1980 Summer Olympics in Moscow and the 1984 Summer Olympics in Los Angeles, he finished in sixth position with the Dutch national team.

== See also ==
- Netherlands men's Olympic water polo team records and statistics
- List of men's Olympic water polo tournament goalkeepers
