= Bobbie Brebde =

Dutch water polo player (born 1970)

Personal information
- Nationality: Dutch
- Born: 31 December 1970 (age 54); The Hague, Netherlands

Sport
- Sport: Water polo

Bobbie Brebde (born 31 December 1970) is a Dutch water polo player. He competed in the men's tournament at the 2000 Summer Olympics.
