= Gijze Stroboer =

Dutch water polo player (born 1954)

Personal information
- Born: 24 May 1954 (age 72) Amsterdam, Netherlands

Sport
- Sport: Water polo
Medal record
Representing Netherlands
Olympic Games
Bronze medal – third place	1976 Montreal	Team competition

Gijze Stroboer (born 24 May 1954) is a former competitive water polo player from the Netherlands, who participated in two consequentive Summer Olympics. On his debut, at the Munich Games in 1972, he finished in seventh position with the Dutch Men's Team. Four years later in Montreal, Quebec, Canada, Stroboer won the bronze medal with the Dutch squad.

== See also ==
- List of Olympic medalists in water polo (men)
