= John Jansen (water polo) =

Dutch water polo player (born 1963)

Personal information
- Born: August 26, 1963 (age 61); Veldhoven, Netherlands

Sport
- Sport: Water polo

John Jansen (born August 26, 1963) is a retired water polo player from the Netherlands, who finished in ninth position with the Dutch team at the 1992 Summer Olympics in Barcelona.
