= Stan van Belkum =

Dutch water polo player (born 1961)

Personal information
- Born: 1 February 1961 (age 65) Warmond, Netherlands

Sport
- Sport: Water polo

Stanislaus ("Stan") van Belkum (born 1 February 1961) is a Dutch former water polo player, who participated in two Summer Olympics. In 1980 he finished in sixth position with the Dutch team. Four years later in Los Angeles Van Belkum once again gained the sixth spot in the final rankings with Holland.
