= Hans Parrel =

Dutch water polo player (born 1944)

Personal information
- Born: September 14, 1944 (age 80); Utrecht, Netherlands

Sport
- Sport: Water polo

Hans Parrel (born September 14, 1944) is a former water polo player from the Netherlands, who competed in two consecutive Summer Olympics for his native country, starting in 1968. In Mexico City and Munich he finished in seventh position with the Dutch Men's Water Polo Team.
