= ISSF Olympic skeet =

Variant of skeet shooting used at the Olympic Games

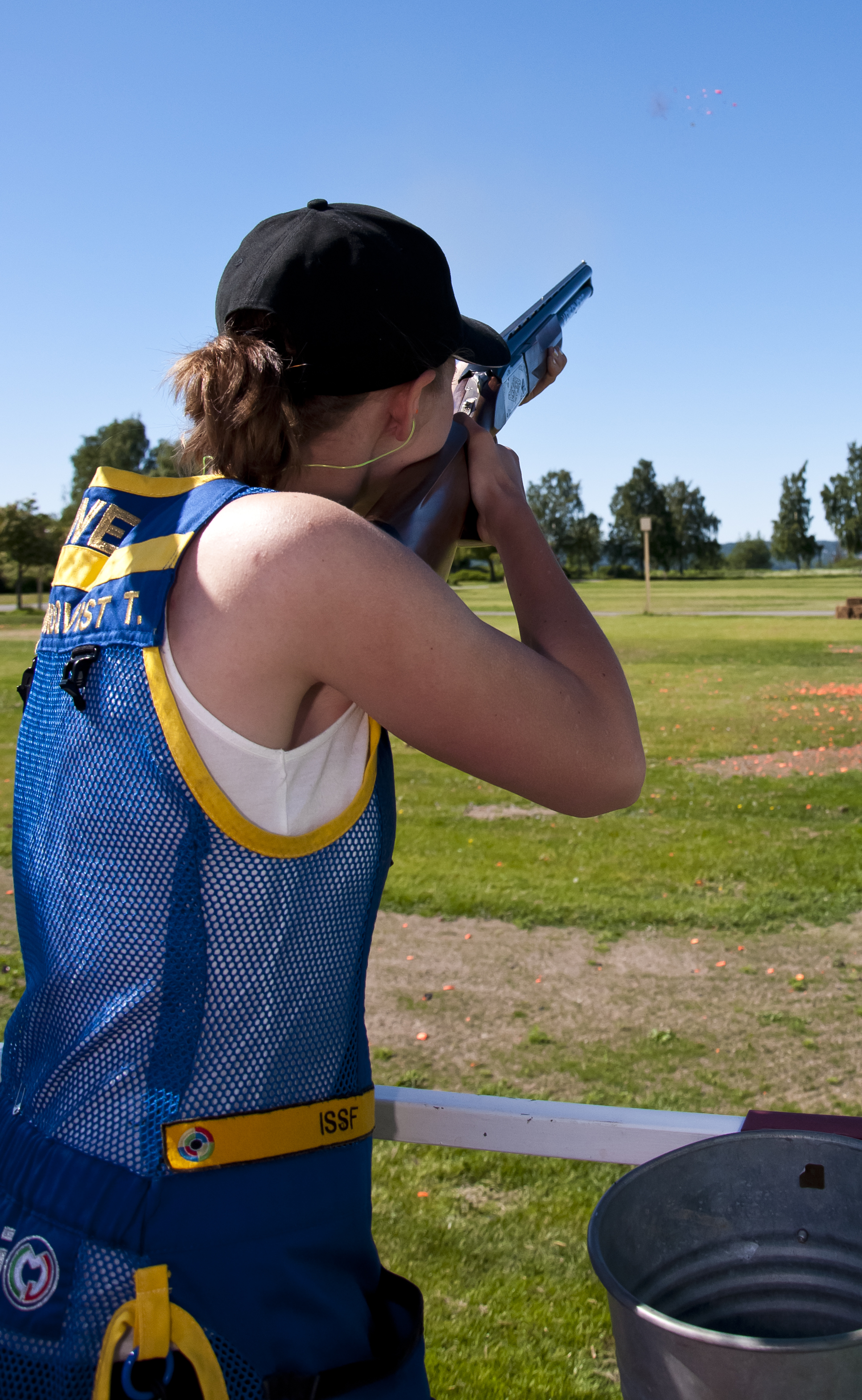

Men
- Number of targets: 125 + 60
- Olympic Games: Since 1968
- Abbreviation: SK125

Women
- Number of targets: 125 + 60
- Olympic Games: Since 2000
- Abbreviation: SK125W

Olympic skeet is a variant of skeet shooting, and the specific variant used in the Olympic Games. The discipline is sanctioned by the International Shooting Sport Federation. Two throwing machines at different heights launch a series of 25 targets in a specific order, some as singles and some as doubles, with the shooter having a fixed position between them. Both men's and women's competitions consist of five such series. The top six competitors shoot an additional series as a final round, on targets filled with special powder to show hits more clearly to the audience. The competitors use shotguns of 12 bore or smaller. All actions are allowed, including double barrel breech loaders, semi-automatic or others, but not pump action guns.

== History ==
Unlike English Skeet, participants shooting Olympic Skeet must call for the clays with guns off the shoulder, with the stock positioned level with the hip. A delay switch is incorporated within the clay trap, meaning the clays might be released immediately or up to three seconds after the shooter calls the clay. Under no circumstances must the gun be moved until the clay is released, or the shooter will face disqualification.

=== Mixed-gender to separate events ===
From the introduction of the sport to the Olympics in 1968 to 1992, the sport was mixed-gender. In 1992, the first woman, Zhang Shan from China, won the gold medal. However, women were barred from competing at the 1996 Olympics in skeet shooting, and since 2000, women have competed in a separate event. A decision to separate men's and women's skeet shooting had been made in December 1991, and in April 1992 the International Shooting Sport Federation decided to eliminate women from both trap and skeet due to a lack of competitors. According to the Federation, the decision was taken "to allow more places for well-qualified men;" trap and skeet events had used a quota system since 1952, which stated no country could field more than two competitors of any gender, and the 1988 Olympic games eliminated the per-country quotas in favor of limiting both events to the top six women and top 48-52 men. All Olympic games since 2000 have maintained separate events for men and women and beginning in Tokyo 2020, a mixed team event.

== 25 Shot Sequence ==
Diagram of a Skeet range layout. The stations are numbered 1-8 counterclockwise around the semicircle, with station 1 on the left corner next to the high house, station 4 at the midpoint of the arc, station 7 at the right corner next to the low house, and station 8 at the midpoint of the flat side.

Station 1

- Single from the High House
- Pair: High House target to be shot first

Station 2

- Single from the High House
- Pair: High House target to be shot first

Station 3

- Single from the High House
- Pair: High House target to be shot first

Station 4 (Part 1)

- Single from the High House
- Single from the Low House

Station 5

- Single from the Low House
- Pair: Low House target to be shot first

Station 6

- Single from the Low House
- Pair: Low House target to be shot first

Station 7

- Pair: Low House target to be shot first

Station 4 (Part 2)

- Pair: High House target to be shot first
- Pair: Low House target to be shot first

Station 8

- Single from the High House
- Single from the Low House

== Olympic Games ==
=== Mixed / Men's skeet ===
Year	Place	Gold	Silver	Bronze
1968	Mexico City	Yevgeni Petrov (URS)	Romano Garagnani (ITA)	Konrad Wirnhier (FRG)
1972	(West Germany) Munich	Konrad Wirnhier (FRG)	Yevgeni Petrov (URS)	Michael Buchheim (GDR)
1976	(Canada) Montreal	Josef Panáček (TCH)	Eric Swinkels (NED)	Wiesław Gawlikowski (POL)
1980	(Soviet Union) Moscow	Kjeld Rasmussen (DEN)	Lars-Göran Carlsson (SWE)	Roberto Castrillo (CUB)
1984	(United States) Los Angeles	Matthew Dryke (USA)	Ole Riber Rasmussen (DEN)	Luca Scribani Rossi (ITA)
1988	(South Korea) Seoul	Axel Wegner (GDR)	Alfonso de Iruarrizaga (CHI)	Jorge Guardiola (ESP)
1992	(Spain) Barcelona	Zhang Shan (CHN)	Juan Giha (PER)	Bruno Rossetti (ITA)
1996	(United States) Atlanta	Ennio Falco (ITA)	Mirosław Rzepkowski (POL)	Andrea Benelli (ITA)
2000	(Australia) Sydney	Mykola Milchev (UKR)	Petr Málek (CZE)	James Graves (USA)
2004	(Greece) Athens	Andrea Benelli (ITA)	Marko Kemppainen (FIN)	Juan Miguel Rodríguez (CUB)
2008	(China) Beijing	Vincent Hancock (USA)	Tore Brovold (NOR)	Anthony Terras (FRA)
2012	(United Kingdom) London	Vincent Hancock (USA)	Anders Golding (DEN)	Nasser Al-Attiyah (QAT)
2016	(Brazil) Rio de Janeiro	Gabriele Rossetti (ITA)	Marcus Svensson (SWE)	Abdullah Al-Rashidi (IOA)
2020	(Japan) Tokyo	Vincent Hancock (USA)	Jesper Hansen (DEN)	Abdullah Al-Rashidi (KUW)
2024	(France) Paris	Vincent Hancock (USA)	Conner Prince (USA)	Lee Meng-yuan (TPE)
2028	(United States) Los Angeles			

=== Women's skeet ===
Year	Place	Gold	Silver	Bronze
2000	(Australia) Sydney	Zemfira Meftahatdinova (AZE)	Svetlana Demina (RUS)	Diána Igaly (HUN)
2004	(Greece) Athens	Diána Igaly (HUN)	Wei Ning (CHN)	Zemfira Meftahatdinova (AZE)
2008	(China) Beijing	Chiara Cainero (ITA)	Kim Rhode (USA)	Christine Brinker (GER)
2012	(United Kingdom) London	Kim Rhode (USA)	Wei Ning (CHN)	Danka Barteková (SVK)
2016	(Brazil) Rio de Janeiro	Diana Bacosi (ITA)	Chiara Cainero (ITA)	Kim Rhode (USA)
2020	(Japan) Tokyo	Amber English (USA)	Diana Bacosi (ITA)	Wei Meng (CHN)
2024	(France) Paris	Francisca Crovetto Chadid (CHI)	Amber Rutter (GBR)	Austen Smith (USA)
2028	(United States) Los Angeles			

=== Mixed skeet team ===
Year	Place	Gold	Silver	Bronze
2024	(France) Paris	(Italy) Italy; Diana Bacosi; Gabriele Rossetti	(United States) United States; Austen Smith; Vincent Hancock	(China) China; Jiang Yiting; Lyu Jianlin

== World Championships, Men ==
Year	Place	Gold	Silver	Bronze
1947	(Sweden) Stockholm	G. Kjellin (SWE)	Carl Palmstierna (SWE)	E. W. Norman (SWE)
1950	(Spain) Madrid	Gerard Batten (USA)	William Mariot (GBR)	Carola Mandel (USA)
1952	(Norway) Oslo	C. T. Edwinson (USA)	Cecil Jones (USA)	Charles Michaelis (USA)
1954	(Venezuela) Caracas	Chester Crites (USA)	Kenneth Pendergrass (USA)	Bengt Malmgren (SWE)
1958	(Soviet Union) Moscow	Arkadiy Kaplun (URS)	Nikolai Durnev (URS)	Juan Garcia (VEN)
1959	(Egypt) Cairo	Oleg Losev (URS)	Yury Tsuranov (URS)	Nikolai Durnev (URS)
1961	(Norway) Oslo	Carlos Plaza Marquez (VEN)	Bernard Hartman (CAN)	Arkadiy Kaplun (URS)
1962	(Egypt) Cairo	Nikolai Durnev (URS)	Yury Tsuranov (URS)	Thomas Heffron (USA)
1965	(Chile) Santiago	Konrad Wirnhier (FRG)	Jorge Jottar (CHI)	Guillermo Raydan (VEN)
1966	(West Germany) Wiesbaden	Jorge Jottar (CHI)	Hans Suppli (FRG)	Artur Rogowski (POL)
1967	(Italy) Bologna	Konrad Wirnhier (FRG)	Evgeni Petrov (URS)	Yury Tsuranov (URS)
1969	(Spain) San Sebastián	Yury Tsuranov (URS)	Nikolai Benesh (URS)	Romano Garagnani (ITA)
1970	(United States) Phoenix	Evgeni Petrov (URS)	Yury Tsuranov (URS)	Élie Pénot (FRA)
1971	(Italy) Bologna	Yury Tsuranov (URS)	Klaus Reschke (GDR)	Loris Beccheroni (ITA)
1973	(Australia) Melbourne	Vladimir Andreyev (URS)	Yury Tsuranov (URS)	David Seabrook (GBR)
1974	(Switzerland) Bern	Wiesław Gawlikowski (POL)	Yury Tsuranov (URS)	Markus Remes (FIN)
1975	(West Germany) Munich	Yury Tsuranov (URS)	Wiesław Gawlikowski (POL); Eric Swinkels (NED)	
1977	(France) Antibes	Benny Seiffert (DEN)	Firmo Emilio Roberti Buabud (ARG); Anders Karlsson (SWE)	
1978	(South Korea) Seoul	Luciano Brunetti (ITA)	Firmo Emilio Roberti Buabud (ARG)	Romano Garagnani (ITA)
1979	(Italy) Montecatini Terme	Ole Justesen (DEN)	Lars-Göran Carlsson (SWE)	Tamaz Imnaishvili (URS)
1981	(Argentina) Tucumán	Tamaz Imnaishvili (URS)	Celso Giardini (ITA)	Élie Pénot (FRA); Bruno Rossetti (ITA)
1982	(Venezuela) Caracas	Daniel Carlisle (USA)	Dean Clark (USA)	Norbert Hofmann (FRG)
1983	(Canada) Edmonton	Matthew Dryke (USA)	Bruno Rossetti (FRA)	Michael Thompson E. (USA)
1985	(Italy) Montecatini Terme	Bernhard Hochwald (GDR)	Nam Ho Sin (PRK); Bjoern Thorwaldson (SWE)	
1986	(East Germany) Suhl	Matthew Dryke (USA)	Andrea Benelli (ITA)	Ioan Toman (ROM)
1987	(Venezuela) Valencia	Andrea Benelli (ITA)	Matthew Dryke (USA)	Guillermo Alfredo Torres (CUB)
1989	(Italy) Montecatini Terme	Claudio Giovannangelo (ITA)	Bruno Rossetti (ITA)	Vladimir Sokolov (URS)
1990	(Soviet Union) Moscow	Andrea Benelli (ITA)	Servando Puldón (CUB)	Tamaz Imnaishvili (URS)
1991	(Australia) Perth	Bruno Rossetti (ITA)	Kiek van Ieperen (NED)	Hennie Dompeling (NED)
1993	(Spain) Barcelona	Dean Clark (USA)	Tamaz Imnaishvili (GEO)	Karsten Krogner (DEN)
1994	(Italy) Fagnano	Bruno Rossetti (ITA)	Alexander Cherkasov (RUS)	Ennio Falco (ITA)
1995	(Cyprus) Nicosia	Abdullah Al-Rashidi (KUW)	Valeri Timokhin (AZE)	Hennie Dompeling (NED)
1997	(Peru) Lima	Abdullah Al-Rashidi (KUW)	Ennio Falco (ITA)	Juan Giha (PER)
1998	(Spain) Barcelona	Abdullah Al-Rashidi (KUW)	Nikolai Tiopli (RUS)	James Graves (USA)
1999	(Finland) Tampere	Pietro Genga (ITA)	Drew Harvey (GBR)	Andrea Benelli (ITA)
2001	(Egypt) Cairo	Shawn Dulohery (USA)	Ennio Falco (ITA)	Marko Kemppainen (FIN)
2002	(Finland) Lahti	Harald Jensen (NOR)	Valeriy Shomin (RUS)	Ennio Falco (ITA)
2003	(Cyprus) Nicosia	Andrzej Głyda (POL)	Shawn Dulohery (USA)	Jin Di (CHN)
2005	(Italy) Lonato	Vincent Hancock (USA)	Ennio Falco (ITA)	James Graves (USA)
2006	(Croatia) Zagreb	Andrei Inešin (EST)	Valeriy Shomin (RUS)	Tore Brovold (NOR)
2007	(Cyprus) Nicosia	Georgios Achilleos (CYP)	Ioan Toman (ROU)	Vincent Hancock (USA)
2009	(Slovenia) Maribor	Vincent Hancock (USA)	Georgios Achilleos (CYP)	Ennio Falco (ITA)
2010	(Germany) Munich	Valeriy Shomin (RUS)	Ennio Falco (ITA)	Georgios Achilleos (CYP)
2011	(Serbia) Belgrade	Juan José Aramburu (ESP)	Tore Brovold (NOR)	Abdullah Al-Rashidi (KUW)
2013	(Peru) Lima	Jesper Hansen (DEN)	Ennio Falco (ITA)	Henrik Jansson (SWE)
2014	(Spain) Granada	Alexander Zemlin (RUS)	Anthony Terras (FRA)	Azmy Mehelba (EGY)
2015	(Italy) Lonato	Vincent Hancock (USA)	Anthony Terras (FRA)	Gabriele Rossetti (ITA)
2017	(Russia) Moscow	Gabriele Rossetti (ITA)	Vincent Haaga (GER)	Georgios Achilleos (CYP)
2018	(South Korea) Changwon	Vincent Hancock (USA)	Erik Watndal (NOR)	Riccardo Filippelli (ITA)
2019	(Italy) Lonato del Garda	Tomáš Nýdrle (CZE)	Tammaro Cassandro (ITA)	Jeremy Bird (GBR)
2022	(Croatia) Osijek	Azmy Mehelba (EGY)	Vincent Hancock (USA)	Rashid Saleh Al-Athba (QAT)
2023	(Azerbaijan) Baku	Efthimios Mitas (GRE)	Eetu Kallioinen (FIN)	Azmy Mehelba (EGY)
2025	(Greece) Athens	Vincent Hancock (USA)	Daniel Korcak (CZE)	Emil Peterson (DEN)

== World Championships, Men Team ==
Year	Place	Gold	Silver	Bronze
1958	(Soviet Union) Moscow	(Soviet Union) Soviet Union; Boris Antonov; Yury Tsuranov; Nikolai Durnev; Arkadiy Kaplun	(Venezuela) Venezuela; Juan Garcia; Cardenas I. Arnaldo Rincones; Carlos Plaza Marquez	(Romania) Romania; Gheorghe Enache; Ion Dumitrescu; George Florescu; Popovici S.
1962	(Egypt) Cairo	(United States) United States; Edwin Calhoun; Thomas Heffron; Kenneth Pendergrass; Robert Rodale	(Soviet Union) Soviet Union; Yury Tsuranov; Nikolai Durnev; Arkadiy Kaplun; Evgeni Petrov	(Sweden) Sweden; Alwen C. Klingspor G. Bo Runesson; Lennert Standar
1966	(West Germany) Wiesbaden	(United States) United States; Arthur Harris; Gordon Horner; Frank Suber; Strothe Shumate	(Soviet Union) Soviet Union; Nikolai Durnev; Evgeni Kondratiev; Evgeni Petrov; Yury Tsuranov	(West Germany) West Germany; Haymo Rethwisch; Hans Suppli; Graf von Hoehenthal; Konrad Wirnhier
1967	(Italy) Bologna	(Soviet Union) Soviet Union; Nikolai Durnev; Evgeni Kondratiev; Evgeni Petrov; Yury Tsuranov	(Italy) Italy; Loris Beccheroni; Giancarlo Chiono; Luigi Rivoira; Srefano Rivoira	(Denmark) Denmark; O. W. Folting; Benny Jensen; Karl Eigil Petersen; Benny Seiffert
1969	(Spain) San Sebastián	(Soviet Union) Soviet Union; Nikolai Benesh; Boris Bulba; Evgeni Petrov; Yury Tsuranov	(Poland) Poland; Włodzimierz Danek; Wiesław Gawlikowski; Olgierd Jan Korolkiewicz; Artur Rogowski	(United States) United States; Earl Francis Herring; Provence P. Robert Rodale; Robert Schuehle
1970	(United States) Phoenix	(Soviet Union) Soviet Union; Nikolai Benesh; Evgeni Petrov; Valeriy Serov; Yury Tsuranov	(United States) United States; Kenneth Gilbert; Allen Morrison; Robert Rodale; James Tiner	(France) France; Jean Claude Guadagnini; Robert Melinette; Élie Pénot; Guy Swec
1971	(Italy) Bologna	(Soviet Union) Soviet Union; Evgeni Petrov; Tariel Zhgenti; Gennady Sedinkin; Yury Tsuranov	(East Germany) East Germany; Michael Buchheim; Klaus Krumpholz; Klaus Reschke; Klaus Schulze	(Italy) Italy; Loris Beccheroni; Ercole Casadio; Floriano de Angeli; Romano Garagnani
1973	(Australia) Melbourne	(Soviet Union) Soviet Union; Vladimir Andreyev; Evgeni Petrov; Tariel Zhgenti; Yury Tsuranov	(Sweden) Sweden; Gert-Åke Bengtsson; Jimmy Carlsson; Anders Karlsson; Kurt Samuelsson	(United Kingdom) Great Britain; Alec Bonnett; John Hawke; David Seabrook; Colin John Sephton
1974	(Switzerland) Bern	(Soviet Union) Soviet Union; Alik Aliev; Vladimir Andreyev; Yury Tsuranov; Tariel Zhgenti	(Poland) Poland; Wiesław Gawlikowski; Piotr Nowakowski; Hubert Pawłowski; Jerzy Trzaskowski	(United States) United States; Allen Buntrock; Arthur Harris; John Satterwhite; William Slahucka
1975	(West Germany) Munich	(East Germany) East Germany; Michael Buchheim; Bernhard Hochwald; Wolfgang Klaus; Klaus Reschke	(Poland) Poland; Wiesław Gawlikowski; Piotr Nowakowski; Andrzej Socharski; Jerzy Trzaskowski	(Denmark) Denmark; Leo Christensen; Ole Justesen; Poul Steffensen; Hans Kjeld Rasmussen
1977	(France) Antibes	(United States) United States; Joseph Clemmons; Daniel Carlisle; Alger Mullins; Bradley Jay Simmons	(France) France; Gilbert Beasse; Gerard Crepin; Jean-François Petitpied; Élie Pénot	(Sweden) Sweden; Jan-Aake Bengtsson; Anders Karlsson; Mats Land; Lars Erik Olsson
1978	(South Korea) Seoul	(Italy) Italy; Luciano Brunetti; Lindo Dominici; Romano Garagnani; Giancarlo Mecocci	(France) France; Gerard Crepin; Jean-François Petitpied; Élie Pénot; Bruno Rossetti	(Sweden) Sweden; Gert-Åke Bengtsson; Kent Goran Gustavsson; Manne Johnsson; Anders Karlsson
1979	(Italy) Montecatini Terme	(United States) United States; Joseph Clemmons; Matthew Dryke; John Satterwhite; Jeffrey Sizemore	(Soviet Union) Soviet Union; Alexander Cherkasov; Tamaz Imnaishvili; Timur Matojan; Alexander Skubak	(Italy) Italy; Lindo Dominici; Celso Giardini; Romano Garagnani; Giancarlo Mecocci
1981	(Argentina) Tucumán	(Italy) Italy; Andrea Benelli; Italo Cianfarani; Celso Giardini; Luca Scribani Rossi	(France) France; Jean-François Petitpied; Élie Pénot; Bruno Rossetti; Stéphane Tyssier	(Soviet Union) Soviet Union; Tamaz Imnaishvili; Peeter Päkk; Sergei Shakhvorostov; Tariel Zhgenti
1982	(Venezuela) Caracas	(United States) United States; Daniel Carlisle; Dean Clark; Matthew Dryke; Alger Mullins	(France) France; Gerard Crepin; Élie Pénot; Bruno Rossetti; Stéphane Tyssier	(Italy) Italy; Italo Cianfarani; Celso Giardini; Luca Scribani Rossi; Raffaele Ventilati
1983	(Canada) Edmonton	(United States) United States; Dean Clark; Matthew Dryke; Michael Thompson E.	(Soviet Union) Soviet Union; Sergei Shakhvorostov; Tamaz Imnaishvili; Tariel Zhgenti	(Czechoslovakia) Czechoslovakia; Luboš Adamec; Jan Hula; Miloslav Kalis
1985	(Italy) Montecatini Terme	(United States) United States; Dean Clark; Joseph Dickson; Michael Schmidt Jr.	(Italy) Italy; Andrea Benelli; Celso Giardini; Luca Scribani Rossi	(Czechoslovakia) Czechoslovakia; Luboš Adamec; Bronislav Bechyňský; Stanislav Klofanda
1986	(East Germany) Suhl	(Italy) Italy; Andrea Benelli; Celso Giardini; Luca Scribani Rossi	(East Germany) East Germany; Matthias Dunkel; Bernhard Hochwald; Axel Wegner	(Soviet Union) Soviet Union; Tamaz Imnaishvili; Sergey Kolos; Valeri Timokhin
1987	(Venezuela) Valencia	(East Germany) East Germany; Bernhard Hochwald; Torsten Remter; Axel Wegner	(Italy) Italy; Andrea Benelli; Celso Giardini; Luca Scribani Rossi	(Czechoslovakia) Czechoslovakia; Luboš Adamec; Bronislav Bechyňský; Leoš Hlaváček (Cuba) Cuba; Servando Puldón; Juan Miguel Rodríguez Martínez; Guillermo Alfredo Torres
1989	(Italy) Montecatini Terme	(Italy) Italy; Andrea Benelli; Claudio Giovannangelo; Bruno Rossetti	(Soviet Union) Soviet Union; Vassili Gussev; Vladimir Sokolov; Valeri Timokhin	(Cuba) Cuba; Servando Puldón; Juan Miguel Rodríguez Martínez; Guillermo Alfredo Torres
1990	(Soviet Union) Moscow	(Czechoslovakia) Czechoslovakia; Bronislav Bechyňský; Leoš Hlaváček; Petr Málek	(Soviet Union) Soviet Union; Tamaz Imnaishvili; Peeter Päkk; Valeri Timokhin	(Cuba) Cuba; Servando Puldón; Juan Miguel Rodríguez Martínez; Guillermo Alfredo Torres
1991	(Australia) Perth	(United States) United States; Dean Clark; Michael Schmidt Jr. Bill Roy	(Soviet Union) Soviet Union; Alexander Cherkasov; Andrei Inešin; Vladimir Sokolov	(Czechoslovakia) Czechoslovakia; Luboš Adamec; Leoš Hlaváček; Petr Málek
1993	(Spain) Barcelona	(Italy) Italy; Andrea Benelli; Claudio Giovannangelo; Bruno Rossetti	(Denmark) Denmark; Karsten Krogner; Frank Nielsen; Ole Riber Rasmussen	(United States) United States; Dean Clark; James Graves; Bill Roy
1994	(Italy) Fagnano	(Italy) Italy; Andrea Benelli; Ennio Falco; Bruno Rossetti	(Russia) Russia; Sergey Aksyutin; Alexander Cherkasov; Oleg Tishin	(Germany) Germany; Jan-Henrik Heinrich; Bernhard Hochwald; Axel Wegner
1995	(Cyprus) Nicosia	(Romania) Romania; Attila Iosif Ciorba; Marin Matei; Ioan Toman	(Italy) Italy; Andrea Benelli; Ennio Falco; Bruno Rossetti	(Georgia (country)) Georgia; David Kvatadze; Tamaz Imnaishvili; Givi Shengelia
1997	(Peru) Lima	(United States) United States; Joseph Buffa; Shawn Dulohery; James Graves	(Cuba) Cuba; Servando Puldón; Juan Miguel Rodríguez Martínez; Guillermo Alfredo Torres	(Russia) Russia; Nikolay Salmin; Oleg Tishin; Nikolai Tiopli
1998	(Spain) Barcelona	(Finland) Finland; Timo Laitinen; Janne Himanka; Jani Eklund	(Czech Republic) Czech Republic; Bronislav Bechyňský; Jan Sychra; Petr Málek	(Russia) Russia; Alexey Vetosh; Oleg Tishin; Nikolai Tiopli
1999	(Finland) Tampere	(Italy) Italy; Pietro Genga; Andrea Benelli; Ennio Falco	(Cuba) Cuba; Guillermo Alfredo Torres; Juan Miguel Rodríguez Martínez; Servando Puldón	(Kuwait) Kuwait; Abdullah Al-Rashidi; Salah Almutairi; Anwer Alhammad
2001	(Egypt) Cairo	(Czech Republic) Czech Republic; Leoš Hlaváček; Petr Málek; Jan Sychra	(Cyprus) Cyprus; Georgios Achilleos; Antonakis Andreou; Kyriacos Christoforou	(United States) United States; Joseph Buffa; Shawn Dulohery; James Graves
2002	(Finland) Lahti	(Czech Republic) Czech Republic; Bronislav Bechyňský; Leoš Hlaváček; Jan Sychra	(United States) United States; Shawn Dulohery; James Graves; David Treadwell	(Russia) Russia; Valeriy Shomin; Aleksey Skorobogatov; Oleg Tishin
2003	(Cyprus) Nicosia	(Cyprus) Cyprus; Kyriacos Christoforou; Antonis Nikolaidis; Christos Kourtellas	(China) China; Jin Di; Ridong Qu; Xiguang Gao	(Italy) Italy; Andrea Benelli; Pietro Genga; Ennio Falco
2005	(Italy) Lonato	(Norway) Norway; Tore Brovold; Erik Watndal; Harald Jensen	(United States) United States; Vincent Hancock; James Graves; Mark Weeks	(Italy) Italy; Ennio Falco; Valerio Luchini; Andrea Benelli
2006	(Croatia) Zagreb	(Italy) Italy; Valerio Luchini; Ennio Falco; Andrea Benelli	(Czech Republic) Czech Republic; Jan Sychra; Ales Hutar; Leoš Hlaváček	(Norway) Norway; Tore Brovold; Erik Watndal; Harald Jensen
2007	(Cyprus) Nicosia	(Cyprus) Cyprus; Georgios Achilleos; Kyriacos Christoforou; Antonis Nikolaidis	(Czech Republic) Czech Republic; Leoš Hlaváček; Jan Sychra; Bretislav Dolecek	(United States) United States; Vincent Hancock; James Graves; Shawn Dulohery
2009	(Slovenia) Maribor	(United States) United States; Vincent Hancock; Shawn Dulohery; Frank Thompson	(Finland) Finland; Marko Kemppainen; Heikki Meriluoto; Lauri Leskinen	(Denmark) Denmark; Anders Golding; Jesper Hansen; Michael Nielsen
2010	(Germany) Munich	(Cyprus) Cyprus; Antonakis Andreou; Georgios Achilleos; Kyriacos Christoforou	(Italy) Italy; Ennio Falco; Angelo Moscariello; Valerio Luchini	(France) France; Anthony Terras; Éric Delaunay; Edouard Poumaillou
2011	(Serbia) Belgrade	(Russia) Russia; Valeriy Shomin; Anton Astakhov; Evgeniy Serbin	(Denmark) Denmark; Martin Holmgaard; Jesper Hansen; Anders Golding	(United Arab Emirates) United Arab Emirates; Saif Bin Futtais; Saeed Almaktoum; Mohamed Ahmad
2013	(Peru) Lima	(Italy) Italy; Giancarlo Tazza; Ennio Falco; Luigi Lodde	(Czech Republic) Czech Republic; Tomas Nydrle; Jan Sychra; Jakub Tomeček	(Norway) Norway; Ole Eilif Undseth; Tom Beier Jensen; Tore Brovold
2014	(Spain) Granada	(Italy) Italy; Luigi Lodde; Riccardo Filippelli; Tammaro Cassandro	(United States) United States; Vincent Hancock; Frank Thompson; Dustin David Perry	(France) France; Anthony Terras; Éric Delaunay; Emmanuel Petit
2015	(Italy) Lonato	(France) France; Anthony Terras; Éric Delaunay; Emmanuel Petit	(Italy) Italy; Gabriele Rossetti; Luigi Lodde; Valerio Luchini	(United States) United States; Vincent Hancock; Dustin David Perry; Thomas Bayer
2017	(Russia) Moscow	(Italy) Italy; Gabriele Rossetti; Tammaro Cassandro; Riccardo Filippelli	(Russia) Russia; Nikolay Teplyy; Alexander Zemlin; Anton Astakhov	(Czech Republic) Czech Republic; Milos Slavicek; Jan Zamecnik; Tomas Nydrle
2018	(South Korea) Changwon	(France) France; Emmanuel Petit; Éric Delaunay; Anthony Terras	(Italy) Italy; Riccardo Filippelli; Gabriele Rossetti; Tammaro Cassandro	(Russia) Russia; Anton Astakhov; Alexander Zemlin; Yaroslav Startsev
2019	(Italy) Lonato del Garda	(Sweden) Sweden; Marcus Svensson; Stefan Nilsson; Henrik Jansson	(Cyprus) Cyprus; Georgios Achilleos; Dimitris Konstantinou; Nicolas Vasiliou	(Italy) Italy; Tammaro Cassandro; Gabriele Rossetti; Riccardo Filippelli
2022	(Croatia) Osijek	(Italy) Italy; Tammaro Cassandro; Elia Sdruccioli; Gabriele Rossetti	(United States) United States; Dustan Taylor; Christian Elliott; Vincent Hancock	(Czech Republic) Czech Republic; Radek Prokop; Jakub Tomeček; Tomáš Nýdrle
2023	(Azerbaijan) Baku	(United States) United States; Vincent Hancock; Christian Elliott; Dustan Taylor	(Greece) Greece; Efthimios Mitas; Charalambos Chalkiadakis; Nikolaos Mavrommatis	(Italy) Italy; Gabriele Rossetti; Tammaro Cassandro; Erik Pittini

== World Championships, Women ==
Year	Place	Gold	Silver	Bronze
1962	(Egypt) Cairo	Mercedes Mata (VEN)	Marjorie Annan (USA)	Elena Shebashova (URS)
1966	(West Germany) Wiesbaden	Claudia Smirnova (URS)	Mercedes Garcia (VEN)	Michele Valery (FRA)
1967	(Italy) Bologna	Larisa Gurvich (URS)	Claudia Smirnova (URS)	Mirella Lenzini (ITA)
1969	(Spain) San Sebastián	Nuria Ortiz (MEX)	Larisa Gurvich (URS)	Elena Shebashova (URS)
1970	(United States) Phoenix	Larissa Korchinskaya (URS)	Nuria Ortiz (MEX)	Kari Linden (NOR)
1971	(Italy) Bologna	Nuria Ortiz (MEX)	Larissa Korchinskaya (URS)	Kari Linden (NOR)
1974	(Switzerland) Bern	Larissa Korchinskaya (URS)	Saskia Brixner (FRG)	Eivor Melander (SWE)
1975	(West Germany) Munich	Larisa Gurvich (URS)	Pinky Le Grelle (BEL)	Ruth Jordan (FRG)
1977	(France) Antibes	Ruth Jordan (FRG)	Ila Hill (USA)	Bianca Rosa Hansberg (ITA)
1978	(South Korea) Seoul	Bianca Rosa Hansberg (ITA)	Terry Bankey (USA)	Ruth Jordan (FRG)
1979	(Italy) Montecatini Terme	Bianca Rosa Hansberg (ITA)	Larisa Gurvich (URS)	Svetlana Yakimova (URS)
1981	(Argentina) Tucumán	Lanying Wu (CHN)	Ila Hill (USA)	Bianca Rosa Hansberg (ITA)
1982	(Venezuela) Caracas	Svetlana Yakimova (URS)	Meimei Feng (CHN)	Weiping Shao (CHN)
1983	(Canada) Edmonton	Svetlana Yakimova (URS)	Nuria Ortiz (MEX)	Terry Carlisle (USA)
1985	(Italy) Montecatini Terme	Terry Carlisle (USA)	Ling Liu (CHN)	Weiping Shao (CHN)
1986	(East Germany) Suhl	Svetlana Demina (URS)	Michaela Rink (FRG)	Connie Schiller (USA)
1987	(Venezuela) Valencia	Meimei Feng (CHN)	Bonnie Mc Laurin (USA)	Nuria Ortiz (MEX)
1989	(Italy) Montecatini Terme	Shan Zhang (CHN)	Antonella Parrini (ITA)	Erzsebet Vasvari (HUN)
1990	(Soviet Union) Moscow	Svetlana Demina (URS)	Erzsebet Vasvari (HUN)	Shan Zhang (CHN)
1991	(Australia) Perth	Jong Ran Pak (PRK)	Svetlana Demina (URS)	Erzsebet Vasvari (HUN)
1994	(Italy) Fagnano	Erdzhanik Avetisyan (ARM)	Diána Igaly (HUN)	Daniela Bolis (ITA)
1995	(Cyprus) Nicosia	Zemfira Meftahatdinova (AZE)	Connie Schiller (USA)	Diána Igaly (HUN)
1997	(Peru) Lima	Antonella Parrini (ITA)	Diana Valk (NED)	Jaana Pitkanen (FIN)
1998	(Spain) Barcelona	Diána Igaly (HUN)	Shan Zhang (CHN)	Andrea Stranovská (SVK)
1999	(Finland) Tampere	Erdzhanik Avetisyan (RUS)	Cristina Vitali (ITA)	Svetlana Demina (RUS)
2001	(Egypt) Cairo	Zemfira Meftahatdinova (AZE)	Olga Panarina (RUS)	Cristina Vitali (ITA)
2002	(Finland) Lahti	Diána Igaly (HUN)	Andrea Stranovská (SVK)	Elena Little (GBR)
2003	(Cyprus) Nicosia	Ning Wei (CHN)	Katiuscia Spada (ITA)	Diána Igaly (HUN)
2005	(Italy) Lonato	Veronique Girardet-Allard (FRA)	Cristina Vitali (ITA)	Danka Barteková (SVK)
2006	(Croatia) Zagreb	Erdzhanik Avetisyan (RUS)	Chiara Cainero (ITA)	Danka Barteková (SVK)
2007	(Cyprus) Nicosia	Christine Brinker (GER)	Ning Wei (CHN)	Chiara Cainero (ITA)
2009	(Slovenia) Maribor	Christine Brinker (GER)	Sutiya Jiewchaloemmit (THA)	Katiuscia Spada (ITA)
2010	(Germany) Munich	Kim Rhode (USA)	Wei Ning (CHN)	Danka Barteková (SVK)
2011	(Serbia) Belgrade	Christine Wenzel (GER)	Wei Ning (CHN)	Kim Rhode (USA)
2013	(Peru) Lima	Christine Wenzel (GER)	Simona Scocchoetti (ITA)	Elena Allen (GBR)
2014	(Spain) Granada	Brandy Drozd (USA)	Elena Allen (GBR)	Danka Barteková (SVK)
2015	(Italy) Lonato	Morgan Craft (USA)	Caitlin Connor (USA)	Ning Wei (CHN)
2017	(Russia) Moscow	Dania Vizzi (USA)	Albina Shakirova (RUS)	Andri Eleftheriou (CYP)
2018	(South Korea) Changwon	Caitlin Connor (USA)	Kim Rhode (USA)	Amber English (USA)
2019	(Italy) Lonato del Garda	Diana Bacosi (ITA)	Wei Meng (CHN)	Victoria Larsson (SWE)
2022	(Croatia) Osijek	Diana Bacosi (ITA)	Amber Hill (GBR)	Samantha Simonton (USA)
2023	(Azerbaijan) Baku	Danka Barteková (SVK)	Dania Vizzi (USA)	Emmanouela Katzouraki (GRE)

== World Championships, Women Team ==
Year	Place	Gold	Silver	Bronze
1975	(West Germany) Munich	(Soviet Union) Soviet Union; Larisa Gurvich; Pelageja Koneeva; Valentina Zakordonets	(Belgium) Belgium; Anne Marie Fontaine; Pinky Le Grelle; Odette Michel	(West Germany) West Germany; Saskia Brixner; Ruth Jordan; Claudia von Kanitz
1977	(France) Antibes	(West Germany) West Germany; Saskia Brixner; Claudia von Kanitz; Ruth Jordan	(United States) United States; Joan Elkins; Eva Funes; Ila Hill	(France) France; Jeanne Blot; Odile Bretault; Daniele Lesprit
1978	(South Korea) Seoul	(West Germany) West Germany; Saskia Brixner; Claudia von Kanitz; Ruth Jordan	(United States) United States; Terry Bankey; Eva Funes; Ila Hill	(South Korea) South Korea; Keun Sil Cha; Sam Lim Park; Hyun Dug Shin
1979	(Italy) Montecatini Terme	(Soviet Union) Soviet Union; Natalia Kuzmenko; Svetlana Yakimova; Larisa Gurvich	(United States) United States; Terry Bankey; Joan Elkins; Ila Hill	(France) France; Jeanne Blot; Martine Delbes; Daniele Lesprit
1981	(Argentina) Tucumán	(China) China; Lanying Wu; Meimei Feng; Weiping Shao	(United States) United States; Ellen Dryke; Ila Hill; Terry Carlisle	(France) France; Jeanne Blot; Martine Delbes; Daniele Lesprit
1982	(Venezuela) Caracas	(China) China; Meimei Feng; Lanying Wu; Weiping Shao	(United States) United States; Terry Carlisle; Ellen Dryke; Connie Schiller	(Sweden) Sweden; Ylva Jansson; Kate Magnusson; Ulla Samuelsson
1983	(Canada) Edmonton	(China) China; Meimei Feng; Weiping Shao; Lanying Wu	(United States) United States; Terry Carlisle; Ila Hill; Connie Schiller	(Sweden) Sweden; Ylva Jansson; Kate Magnusson; Ulla Samuelsson
1985	(Italy) Montecatini Terme	(China) China; Ling Liu; Weiping Shao; Jie Wu	(United States) United States; Terry Carlisle; Ellen Dryke; Eva Funes	(Italy) Italy; Rossane Bernardini; Sonja Garagnani; Bianca Rosa Hansberg
1986	(East Germany) Suhl	(China) China; Meimei Feng; Ling Liu; Weiping Shao	(Soviet Union) Soviet Union; Svetlana Demina; Zemfira Meftahatdinova; Elena Pushina	(Poland) Poland; Elzbieta Bednarczuk; Dorota Chytrowska Mika; Alicja Wilczynska
1989	(Italy) Montecatini Terme	(China) China; Meimei Feng; Lanying Wu; Shan Zhang	(United States) United States; Connie Fluker; Cindy Rauhauge; Dorie Ann Vandentop	(Hungary) Hungary; Jozsefne Igaly; Diána Igaly; Erzsebet Vasvari
1990	(Soviet Union) Moscow	(Hungary) Hungary; Ibolya Gobolos; Diána Igaly; Erzsebet Vasvari	(China) China; Weiping Shao; Lanying Wu; Shan Zhang	(Soviet Union) Soviet Union; Svetlana Demina; Zemfira Meftahatdinova; Elena Pushina
1991	(Australia) Perth	(North Korea) North Korea; Myong Hwa Kim; Hyon Ok Li; Jong Ran Pak	(China) China; Weiping Shao; Lanying Wu; Shan Zhang	(Hungary) Hungary; Ibolya Gobolos; Diána Igaly; Erzsebet Vasvari
1994	(Italy) Fagnano	(Hungary) Hungary; Ibolya Gobolos; Diána Igaly; Erzsebet Vasvari	(United States) United States; Terry Bankey; Shari Legate; Connie Schiller	(Italy) Italy; Daniela Bolis; Sabrina Nardini; Antonella Parrini
1995	(Cyprus) Nicosia	(United States) United States; Kim Rhode; Connie Schiller; Colleen Rumore	(Hungary) Hungary; Ibolya Gobolos; Diána Igaly; Erzsebet Vasvari	(Italy) Italy; Daniela Bolis; Cristina Vitali; Antonietta Zaino
1998	(Spain) Barcelona	(China) China; Haiyan Liao; Shan Zhang; Zhenru Chen	(Russia) Russia; Marina Tarasevich; Svetlana Demina; Erdzhanik Avetisyan	(Italy) Italy; Daniela Bolis; Antonella Parrini; Sabrina Nardini
1999	(Finland) Tampere	(Russia) Russia; Erdzhanik Avetisyan; Svetlana Demina; Larisa Antochina	(China) China; Shan Zhang; Zhenru Chen; Chang Nie	(United Kingdom) Great Britain; Kelly Elvin; Susan Bramley; Elena Little
2001	(Egypt) Cairo	(Russia) Russia; Erdzhanik Avetisyan; Svetlana Demina; Olga Panarina	(China) China; Zhenru Chen; Ning Wei; Shan Zhang	(Italy) Italy; Chiara Cainero; Sabrina Nardini; Cristina Vitali
2002	(Finland) Lahti	(China) China; Zhenru Chen; Hong Yan Shi; Ning Wei	(Russia) Russia; Erdzhanik Avetisyan; Svetlana Demina; Olga Panarina	(Hungary) Hungary; Ibolya Gobolos; Diána Igaly; Erzsebet Vasvari
2003	(Cyprus) Nicosia	(United States) United States; Connie Smotek; Brandie Neal; Shari Legate	(Russia) Russia; Svetlana Demina; Erdzhanik Avetisyan; Olga Panarina	(Italy) Italy; Katiuscia Spada; Cristina Vitali; Chiara Cainero
2005	(Italy) Lonato	(Italy) Italy; Cristina Vitali; Katiuscia Spada; Chiara Cainero	(Slovakia) Slovakia; Danka Barteková; Andrea Stranovská; Lenka Bartekova	(United States) United States; Haley Dunn; Connie Smotek; Brandie Neal
2006	(Croatia) Zagreb	(United States) United States; Connie Smotek; Brandie Neal; Haley Dunn	(Russia) Russia; Erdzhanik Avetisyan; Svetlana Demina; Olga Panarina	(Italy) Italy; Chiara Cainero; Katiuscia Spada; Cristina Vitali
2007	(Cyprus) Nicosia	(China) China; Ning Wei; Xiumin Yu; Shan Zhang	(United States) United States; Haley Dunn; Kim Rhode; Connie Smotek	(Italy) Italy; Chiara Cainero; Katiuscia Spada; Cristina Vitali
2009	(Slovenia) Maribor	(Russia) Russia; Olga Panarina; Svetlana Demina; Nadezda Konovalova	(Italy) Italy; Katiuscia Spada; Chiara Cainero; Cristina Vitali	(Slovakia) Slovakia; Danka Barteková; Monika Zemkova; Lenka Bartekova
2010	(Germany) Munich	(United States) United States; Kim Rhode; Haley Dunn; Amber English	(China) China; Ning Wei; Heng Zhang; Shan Zhang	(Slovakia) Slovakia; Danka Barteková; Lenka Bartekova; Monika Zemkova
2011	(Serbia) Belgrade	(China) China; Ning Wei; Shan Zhang; Donglian Zhang	(Italy) Italy; Katiuscia Spada; Chiara Cainero; Simona Scocchetti	(Slovakia) Slovakia; Danka Barteková; Andrea Stranovská; Monika Zemkova
2013	(Peru) Lima	(Italy) Italy; Diana Bacosi; Simona Scocchetti; Katiuscia Spada	(United Kingdom) Great Britain; Amber Hill; Elena Allen; Pinky Le Grelle	(Russia) Russia; Olga Panarina; Landish Kvartalova; Nadezda Konovalova
2014	(Spain) Granada	(United Kingdom) Great Britain; Elena Allen; Amber Hill; Sarah Gray	(Slovakia) Slovakia; Danka Barteková; Andrea Stranovská; Monika Stibrava	(United States) United States; Brandy Drozd; Kim Rhode; Haley Dunn
2015	(Italy) Lonato	(United States) United States; Morgan Craft; Caitlin Connor; Kim Rhode	(Italy) Italy; Katiuscia Spada; Diana Bacosi; Chiara Cainero	(China) China; Ning Wei; Meng Wei; Piao Piao Lin
2017	(Russia) Moscow	(United States) United States; Kim Rhode; Dania Vizzi; Caitlin Connor	(Italy) Italy; Diana Bacosi; Katiuscia Spada; Simona Scocchetti	(Russia) Russia; Albina Shakirova; Nadezda Konovalova; Anastasia Krakhmaleva
2018	(South Korea) Changwon	(United States) United States; Caitlin Connor; Kim Rhode; Amber English	(Italy) Italy; Katiuscia Spada; Diana Bacosi; Chiara Cainero	(Cyprus) Cyprus; Andri Eleftheriou; Konstantia Nikolaou; Panagiota Andreou
2019	(Italy) Lonato del Garda	(United States) United States; Dania Vizzi; Kim Rhode; Samantha Simonton	(Italy) Italy; Diana Bacosi; Chiara Cainero; Simona Scocchetti	(China) China; Wei Meng; Zhang Heng; Zhang Donglian
2022	(Croatia) Osijek	(United States) United States; Dania Vizzi; Austen Smith; Samantha Simonton	(Italy) Italy; Chiara Cainero; Chiara Di Marziantonio; Diana Bacosi	(China) China; Jiang Yiting; Che Yufei; Huang Sixue
2023	(Azerbaijan) Baku	(United States) United States; Austen Smith; Dania Vizzi; Samantha Simonton	(Italy) Italy; Martina Bartolomei; Diana Bacosi; Simona Scocchetti	(Slovakia) Slovakia; Danka Barteková; Vanesa Hocková; Monika Štibravá

== World Championships, total medals ==
Rank	Nation	Gold	Silver	Bronze	Total
1	United States	27	27	16	70
2	Soviet Union	27	21	12	60
3	Italy	21	18	28	67
4	China	13	9	5	27
5	West Germany	5	3	5	13
6	Russia	4	10	4	18
7	Hungary	4	3	7	14
8	East Germany	3	3	0	6
9	Denmark	3	2	4	9
10	Cyprus	3	2	0	5
11	Kuwait	3	0	1	4
12	Poland	2	4	2	8
13	Czech Republic	2	3	1	6
14	Venezuela	2	2	2	6
15	Mexico	2	2	1	5
16	Azerbaijan	2	1	0	3
16	North Korea	2	1	0	3
18	Norway	2	0	4	6
19	Germany	2	0	1	3
20	France	1	5	8	14
20	Sweden	1	5	8	14
22	Slovakia	1	2	5	8
23	Finland	1	2	3	6
24	Romania	1	1	2	4
25	Greece	1	1	1	3
26	Chile	1	1	0	2
27	Czechoslovakia	1	0	4	5
28	Egypt	1	0	1	2
29	Armenia	1	0	0	1
29	Estonia	1	0	0	1
29	Spain	1	0	0	1
32	Cuba	0	3	4	7
32	Great Britain	0	3	4	7
34	Netherlands	0	3	2	5
35	Argentina	0	2	0	2
35	Belgium	0	2	0	2
37	Georgia	0	1	1	2
38	Canada	0	1	0	1
38	Thailand	0	1	0	1
40	Peru	0	0	1	1
40	Qatar	0	0	1	1
40	South Korea	0	0	1	1
Totals (42 entries)		141	144	139	424

== Current world records ==
Current world records in skeet as of July 12, 2026
Men	Qualification	125	Valerio Luchini (ITA); Vincent Hancock (USA); Georgios Achilleos (CYP); Anthony Terras (FRA); Tammaro Cassandro (ITA); Riccardo Filippelli (ITA); Ralf Buchheim (GER); Vincent Hancock (USA); Vincent Hancock (USA); Luke Argiro (AUS); Luigi Lodde (ITA); Emmanuel Petit (FRA); Tammaro Cassandro (ITA); Vincent Hancock (USA); Luigi Lodde (ITA); Stefan Nilsson (SWE); Vincent Hancock (USA); Jesper Hansen (DEN); Vincent Hancock (USA); Azmy Mehelba (EGY); Vincent Hancock (USA); Ben Llewellin (GBR); Tammaro Cassandro (ITA); Vincent Hancock (USA)	July 9, 2014; March 9, 2015; April 27, 2015; September 17, 2015; June 10, 2016; July 10, 2016; July 10, 2016; September 14, 2018; March 25, 2019; April 14, 2019; August 22, 2019; September 14, 2019; May 10, 2021; April 27, 2022; April 27, 2022; October 9, 2022; March 7, 2023; July 12, 2023; August 19, 2023; August 19, 2023; October 22, 2023; July 27, 2025; July 27, 2025; December 7, 2025	Beijing (CHN); Acapulco (MEX); Larnaka (CYP); Lonato (ITA); San Marino (SMR); Lonato (ITA); Lonato (ITA); Changwon (KOR); Guadalajara (MEX); Al Ain (UAE); Lahti (FIN); Lonato (ITA); Lonato (ITA); Lonato (ITA); Lonato (ITA); Osijek (CRO); Doha (QAT); Lonato (ITA); Baku (AZE); Baku (AZE); Santiago (CHI); Chateauroux (FRA); Chateauroux (FRA); Doha (QAT)
Men	Final	36	Vincent Hancock (USA)	July 7, 2026	Lonato (ITA)
Men	Teams	371	Italy (Filippelli, Lodde, Rossetti)	July 10, 2016	Lonato (ITA)
Junior Men	Qualification	125	Jordan Douglas Sapp (USA)	July 15, 2024	Porpetto (ITA)
Junior Men	Qualification	125	Marco Coco (ITA)	May 22, 2025	Suhl (GER)
Junior Men	Final	58	Marco Coco (ITA)	June 20, 2026	Suhl (GER)
Junior Men	Teams	363	Italy (Cassandro, Rossetti, Simeone)	August 7, 2013	Suhl (GER)
Women	Qualification	125	Francisca Crovetto Chadid (CHL)	April 27, 2022	Lonato (ITA)
Women	Qualification	125	Danka Barteková (SVK)	March 4, 2023	Doha (QAT)
Women	Final	35	Sara Bongini (ITA)	July 7, 2026	Lonato (ITA)
Women	Final	35	Victoria Larsson (SWE)	July 7, 2026	Lonato (ITA)
Women	Teams	365	United States (Smith, Vizzi, Simonton)	August 18, 2023	Baku (AZE)
Junior Women	Qualification	123	Samantha Simonton (USA)	March 24, 2019	Guadalajara (MEX)
Junior Women	Qualification	123	Austen Jewell Smith (USA)	July 18, 2019	Suhl (GER)
Junior Women	Qualification	123	Jiang Yiting (CHN)	September 27, 2023	Hangzhou (CHN)
Junior Women	Qualification	123	Jiang Yiting (CHN)	December 7, 2025	Doha (QAT)
Junior Women	Final	34	Bethany Lilian Norton (GBR)	June 20, 2026	Suhl (GER)
Junior Women	Teams	356	United States (Smith, Jacob, Simonton)	July 18, 2019	Suhl (GER)
Mixed Team	Qualification	149	Austen Jewell Smith (USA); Vincent Hancock (USA)	August 20, 2023	Baku (AZE)
Mixed Team	Qualification	149	Eman Al-Shamaa (KUW); Abdullah Al-Rashidi (KUW)	September 28, 2023	Hangzhou (CHN)
Mixed Team	Qualification	149	Kimberly Rhode (USA); Vincent Hancock (USA)	February 12, 2024	Rabat (MAR)
Mixed Team	Qualification	149	Diana Bacosi (ITA); Gabriele Rossetti (ITA)	August 5, 2024	Paris (FRA)
Mixed Team	Final	47	Reem Ghanem Al-Sharshani (QAT); Rashid Saleh Al-Athba (QAT)	January 16, 2026	Doha (QAT)
Junior Mixed Team	Qualification	145	Sara Bongini (ITA); Andrea Galadrini (ITA)	September 17, 2023	Osijek (CRO)

== See also ==
- International Shooting Sport Federation
- ISSF shooting events
- ISSF Olympic trap
- Double trap
