= Andrzej Głyda =

Polish sports shooter (born 1979)

Personal information
- Full name: Andrzej Głyda
- Nationality: Poland
- Born: 12 September 1979 (age 47) Poznań, Poland
- Height: 1.80 m (5 ft 11 in)
- Weight: 82 kg (181 lb)

Sport
- Sport: Shooting
- Event: Skeet (SK125)
- Club: WSK Śląsk Wrocław
- Coached by: Wiesław Gawlikowski
Medal record
Men's shooting
Representing Poland
World Championships
Gold medal – first place	2003 Nicosia	SK125
European Championships
Silver medal – second place	2001 Zagreb	SK125

Andrzej Głyda (born 12 September 1979 in Poznań) is a Polish sport shooter. He was selected to compete for Poland in two editions of the Olympic Games (2000 and 2004), and eventually won two career medals, a gold and a silver, in a major international competition, spanning the World and European Championships. Głyda is a member of the shooting team for WSK Śląsk Wrocław, and a resident athlete of the Polish Sport Shooting Federation, where he trains throughout his sporting career under head coach and 1976 Olympic bronze medalist Wiesław Gawlikowski.

Głyda's Olympic debut came as a 21-year-old newcomer at the 2000 Summer Olympics in Sydney, where he tallied 121 birds out of a possible 125 to establish a joint fourteen-place tie with five other shooters, including Australia's home favorite Clive Barton and defending Olympic champion Ennio Falco of Italy, in the men's skeet.

In 2003, Głyda claimed his first ever gold medal in a spectacular fashion at the ISSF World Shotgun Championships in Nicosia, Cyprus with a score of 146, boosting a single-target lead over top three finalists Jin Di of China and Shawn Dulohery of the United States. Coming atop the podium, Głyda also gained an Olympic quota place for Poland, and was eventually selected to compete in his second Games.

At the 2004 Summer Olympics in Athens, Głyda qualified for his second Polish team as a lone shooter in the men's skeet, by having registered a minimum qualifying score of 122 from his fantastic top finish at the World Shotgun Championships less than a year earlier. Clearly one of the frontrunners vying for an Olympic medal as a defending World champion, Głyda slipped out of his contention to an unprecedented tie with seven other shooters for twenty-first place in the qualifying round, shooting an identical score of 119 birds.
