= Hennie Dompeling =

Dutch sport shooter (1966–2023)

Personal information
- Full name: Hendrikus Dompeling
- Nationality: Netherlands
- Born: 9 April 1966 Haarlemmermeer, The; Netherlands
- Died: 25 March 2023 (aged 56) Haarlemmermeer, The; Netherlands
- Height: 1.84 m (6 ft 1/2 in)
- Weight: 126 kg (278 lb)

Sport
- Sport: Shooting
- Event: Skeet (SK125)
- Club: KSV Claybusters
- Coached by: Nella Heemskerk
Medal record
Men's shooting
Representing the Netherlands
World Championships
Bronze medal – third place	1991 Perth	SK
Bronze medal – third place	1995 Nicosia	SK125
European Championships
Gold medal – first place	1995 Lahti	SK125
Bronze medal – third place	1990 Uddevalla	SK
Bronze medal – third place	1991 Bologna	SK
Bronze medal – third place	1995 Lisbon	SK125

Hendrikus "Hennie" Dompeling (9 April 1966 – 25 March 2023) was a Dutch sport shooter. He was born in Haarlemmermeer. He has competed for the Netherlands in skeet shooting at five Olympics (1988 to 2004), and has been close to an Olympic medal in 2000 (finishing in fourth place). Outside the Olympic career, Dompeling has produced a phenomenal record of twenty-one medals in a major international competition: two bronze at the World Championships, a total of four (two golds and two silver) at the ISSF World Cup final, a total of nine (five golds, three silver, one bronze) at numerous ISSF World Cup meets, and a total of six (two golds, one silver, and three bronze) under both junior and senior category at the European Championships.

== Career ==
Having started the sport since the age of fourteen, Dompeling has been a member of Claybusters Skeet Shooting Association (Dutch: Kleiduiven Schiet Vereniging Clay Busters, KSV Claybusters), and a resident athlete of the Royal Netherlands Shooting Federation (Dutch: Koninklijke Nederlandse Schietsport Associatie, KNSA), where he trained throughout his career under head coach Nelia Heemskerk.

Dompeling competed internationally for the Netherlands at the age of eighteen, and then became a junior European champion in skeet shooting at Montecatini, Italy when he was twenty. Two years later, Dompeling made his first Dutch team at the 1988 Summer Olympics, finishing thirteenth in the mixed skeet with 195 points.

In 1991, Dompeling set a new final world record of 225 clay pigeons to take the silver medal at the ISSF World Cup final in Munich, Germany. Dompeling's magnificent world-record feat culminated in a selection of being one of clear favorites for an Olympic medal at his succeeding Games in Barcelona 1992, but slipped out of his contention desperately to forty-second place in the final debut of the mixed skeet, posting a dismal score of 143.

Dompeling reached the peak of his shooting career in the 1995 season by winning a gold medal each at the World Cup and European Championships, and a bronze at the Worlds. On his third Olympic appearance at Atlanta 1996, Dompeling held off a charge from his ill-fated Olympic feat in Barcelona to score 120 targets out of a possible 125 in the qualifying round of the inaugural men's skeet, but his results were not enough to put him through to the final, forcing a tie with four other shooters for fifteenth place.

Dompeling's significant highlight of his Olympic career came in Sydney 2000, when he reached the final for the first time in the men's skeet on his fourth Games. He prevailed in a grueling shoot-off against Italy's Andrea Benelli 4 to 3 for fourth place with a matching score of 146, but fell short of his first ever Olympic medal by just a single target behind the U.S. shooter James Graves.

Two years later, Dompeling emerged victorious from his Olympic medal failure to shoot a single-target lead over U.S. shooter Shawn Dulohery 23 to 22 for the gold at the second meet of the 2002 ISSF World Cup series in Shanghai, China. Coming on top of the World Cup podium for the fifth time in his career (the first being done in 1990), Dompeling also secured an Olympic quota place, and was eventually selected to compete for the Netherlands in his fifth Games.

At the 2004 Summer Olympics in Athens, Dompeling qualified for his fifth Dutch team, as a 38-year-old veteran, in the men's skeet, by having registered a minimum qualifying score of 123 from his fantastic top finish at the World Cup two years earlier. Dompeling could not produce a much electrifying effort from Sydney 2000, as he finished in an unprecedented eight-way tie for twenty-first place with a matching score of 119.

== Olympic results ==
Event	1988	1992	1996	2000	2004
Skeet (mixed)	13th 146+49	42nd 143	Not held		
Skeet (men)	Not held		15th 120	4th 122+24	21st 119
