= Yury Tsuranov =

Soviet sports shooter

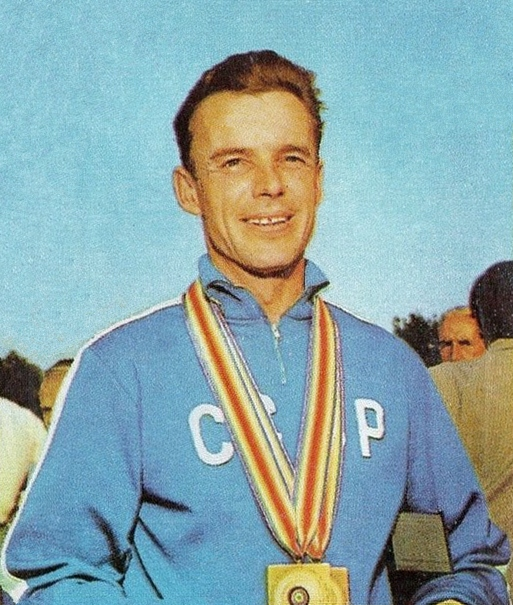
- Tsuranov c. 1972

Personal information
- Born: 2 January 1936 Nerchinsk, Soviet Union
- Died: 15 March 2008 (aged 72) Yekaterinburg, Russia
- Height: 173 cm (5 ft 8 in)
- Weight: 68 kg (150 lb)

Sport
- Sport: Sports shooting
- Event: Olympic skeet
Medal record
Representing the Soviet Union
World Championships
Gold medal – first place	1958 Moscow	Team
Silver medal – second place	1959 Cairo	Individual
Silver medal – second place	1962 Cairo	Individual
Silver medal – second place	1962 Cairo	Team
Silver medal – second place	1962 Wiesbaden	Team
Gold medal – first place	1967 Bologna	Team
Bronze medal – third place	1967 Bologna	Individual
Gold medal – first place	1969 San Sebastian	Individual
Gold medal – first place	1969 San Sebastian	Team
Gold medal – first place	1970 Phoenix	Team
Silver medal – second place	1970 Phoenix	Individual
Gold medal – first place	1971 Bologna	Individual
Gold medal – first place	1971 Bologna	Team
Gold medal – first place	1973 Melbourne	Team
Silver medal – second place	1973 Melbourne	Individual
Gold medal – first place	1974 Bern	Team
Silver medal – second place	1974 Bern	Individual
Gold medal – first place	1975 Munich	Individual

Yury Filaretovich Tsuranov (Russian: Юрий Филаретович Цуранов, 2 January 1936 – 15 March 2008) was a Soviet Olympic skeet shooter. He competed at the 1968, 1972 and the 1976 Summer Olympics and finished in 4th, 13th and 10th place, respectively. Between 1958 and 1975 Tsuranov won three individual and seven team gold medals at the world championships; he became European champion 10 times and Soviet champion 11 times. He had the world's best result (200 out of 200) in 1971. Earlier at the 1963 Soviet Championships Tsuranov and his rival Yevgeni Petrov hit 200 targets out of 200, followed by three series of 25 out of 25. Then the jury stopped the contest and awarded gold medals to both shooters.

Tsuranov graduated from the Moscow institute of noble metals and since 1960 lived in Sverdlovsk. He was the head coach of the Soviet (1978–79) and Russian (1978–89) shooting teams.

Tsuranov died in 2008. He was survived by sons Aleksandr and Konstantin. Konstantin competed in skeet shooting at the 2008 Summer Olympics.
