= Imnaishvili =

Imnaishvili is a surname. Notable people with the surname include:

- Revaz Imnaishvili
- Tamaz Imnaishvili
