= Jorge Jottar =

Chilean sports shooter

Personal information
- Born: 26 June 1929 Requínoa, Chile
- Died: 1 January 2014 (aged 84) Santiago, Chile

Sport
- Sport: Sports shooting

Jorge Jottar (26 June 1929 – 1 January 2014) was a Chilean sports shooter whose specialty was the skeet shot. He was world champion of this discipline in 1966, winning the World Shooting Championships held in Wiesbaden, Germany, where he hit 197 cymbals of 200.

== Biography ==
He was born on 26 June 1929, in the commune of Requínoa, Caupolicán department, province of Colchagua, to Lebanese immigrants. He studied at the O'Higgins Institute in Rancagua, and subsequently devoted himself to the fruit trade. He married Teresa Nasrallah, with whom he had 7 children, one of them being Patricio Jottar current CEO of Compañía de Cervecerías Unidas (CCU), Chile's biggest brewery. He began practicing skeet shooting in 1961.

He won second place in Olympic skeet shooting at the 1965 World Shotgun Championships held in November 1965 at the Club de Lo Curro, Santiago, Chile. On the occasion he obtained a mark of 196 cymbals of 200, being only surpassed by the German Konrad Wirnhier, who achieved the 199 / 200.5 mark. He also integrated the Chilean skeet shooting team, along with Ángel Marentis, Enrique Núñez and Gilberto Navarro, who achieved second place in that category.

The following year, he participated in the 1966 World Shooting Championships held in Wiesbaden, then belonging to the Federal Republic of Germany. The tournament brought together 1050 specialists from 52 countries, including six Chileans; In addition to Jottar, Juan Enrique Lira, Gilberto Navarro, Carlos Pabst, Pedro Estay, and Fritz Dreyer, commander of the Chilean Air Force, attended. In the German World Cup, Jottar surpassed his 1965 mark, achieving 197/200 cymbals, with what achieved the first place of the appointment, surpassing Hans Joachin Suppli of East Germany, who made 196/200, and the Polish Artur Rogovski, whose mark was 195/200 cymbals. His feat made him deserving of the prize to the Best Athlete of Chile 1966, awarded by the Circle of Sports Journalists of Chile.

He subsequently participated in the skeet event at the 1968 Summer Olympics where he won 7th place among 52 participants, 7 obtaining an Olympic diploma.

He died on 1 January 2014 from natural causes at the age of 84.
