= Reschke =

Reschke is a German surname. Notable people with the surname include:

- Anja Reschke (born 1972), German journalist
- Klaus Reschke (born 1953), German sports shooter
- Tom Reschke, American musician from Youngblood Brass Band
- Willi Reschke (1922–2017), German Luftwaffe ace
