= Harald Jensen (sport shooter) =

Norwegian sports shooter (born 1966)

Medal record

Skeet

Representing Norway

ISSF World Shooting Championships
Gold medal – first place	2002 Lahti	Skeet
Gold medal – first place	2005 Lonato	Skeet - team
Bronze medal – third place	2006 Zagreb	Skeet - team

ISSF European Shooting Championships
Gold medal – first place	1993 Brno	Skeet
Gold medal – first place	1993 Brno	Skeet - team
Gold medal – first place	2002 Lonato	Skeet - team
Gold medal – first place	2004 Latsia	Skeet - team
Silver medal – second place	2001 Zagreb	Skeet - team
Silver medal – second place	2005 Beograd	Skeet - team
Silver medal – second place	2008 Nicosia	Skeet
Bronze medal – third place	2001 Zagreb	Skeet

Harald Jensen (born 18 December 1966) is a Norwegian sport shooter competing in Skeet. Jensen won the gold medal at both the ISSF World Shooting Championships and the ISSF European Shooting Championships in 2002. He finished as number six at the 2004 Summer Olympics.

Olympic results
Event	1992	1996	2000	2004	2008
Skeet (mixed)	33rd 144	Not held			
Skeet (men)	Not held	26th 118	23rd 119	6th 122+23	12th 118
