= Leoš Hlaváček =

Czech sport shooter (born 1963)

Leoš Hlaváček (born 30 October 1963 in Pardubice) is a Czech sport shooter. He competed in skeet shooting events at the Summer Olympics in 1988, 1992, and 1996.

== Olympic results ==
Event	1988	1992	1996
Skeet (mixed)	T-13th	T-16th	Not held
Skeet (men)	Not held		T-32nd
