= Katiuscia Spada =

Italian sport shooter (born 1981)

Personal information
- Nationality: Italian
- Born: 16 November 1981 (age 44) Città della Pieve, Italy
- Height: 1.63 m (5 ft 4 in)
- Weight: 53 kg (117 lb)

Sport
- Country: Italy
- Sport: Shooting
- Event: Skeet
- Club: Fiamme Oro
Medal record
World Championships
| Silver medal – second place | 2018 Changwon | Skeet team |

Katiuscia Spada (born 16 November 1981) is an Italian sport shooter.

She participated at the 2018 ISSF World Shooting Championships, winning a medal.
