= Connie Smotek =

American sport shooter

Personal information
- Full name: Connie Jean Fluker-Smotek
- Nationality: United States
- Born: August 22, 1964 (age 62) Temple, Texas, U.S.
- Height: 5 ft 5 in (1.65 m)
- Weight: 139 lb (63 kg)

Sport
- Sport: Shooting
- Event: Skeet (SK75)
- Club: Brazos Valley Skeet and Trap; Club
- Coached by: Lloyd Woodhouse
Medal record
Women's shooting
Representing the United States
World Championships
Silver medal – second place	1995 Nicosia	SK125W
Bronze medal – third place	1986 Suhl	SKW

Connie Jean Smotek (née Fluker; born August 22, 1964, in Temple, Texas) is an American sport shooter. She produced a career tally of eleven medals, including two (one silver and one bronze) in skeet shooting at the World Championships (1986 and 1995), and was selected to compete for the U.S. team in two editions of the Olympic Games (1992 and 2004). Having pursued the sport since the age of fourteen, Smotek trained full-time as a member of the skeet team for Brazos Valley Skeet and Trap Club in College Station, Texas, under her personal coach Lloyd Woodhouse. Smotek is also a graduate of Texas A&M University, and has been employed as an administrative assistant by the University's agriculture program since 1995.

Smotek was one of the six female shooters who competed in the mixed skeet tournament at the 1992 Summer Olympics in Barcelona, where she scored 145 out of 150 targets to share a twenty-fifth place tie with eight other shooters in the qualifying stage, narrowly missing out on the final by a single bird.

Twelve years after competing in her first Olympics, Smotek qualified for her second U.S. shooting team, as a 40-year-old, in the women's skeet at the 2004 Summer Olympics in Athens. Five months before the Games, she took a three-shot lead over her rival Haley Dunn to receive a cumulative score of 488 out of a possible 500 targets and grab one of the available Olympic slots for the U.S. team at the Olympic trials in Fort Benning, Georgia. Smotek fired her first 11 shots in the final round, but could not move into the medal position with only 22 out of 25 birds, finishing only in sixth place for a total record of 90. Earlier in the prelims, Smotek shot a score of 68 to attain one of the six places for the final.
