= Romano Garagnani =

Italian sports shooter

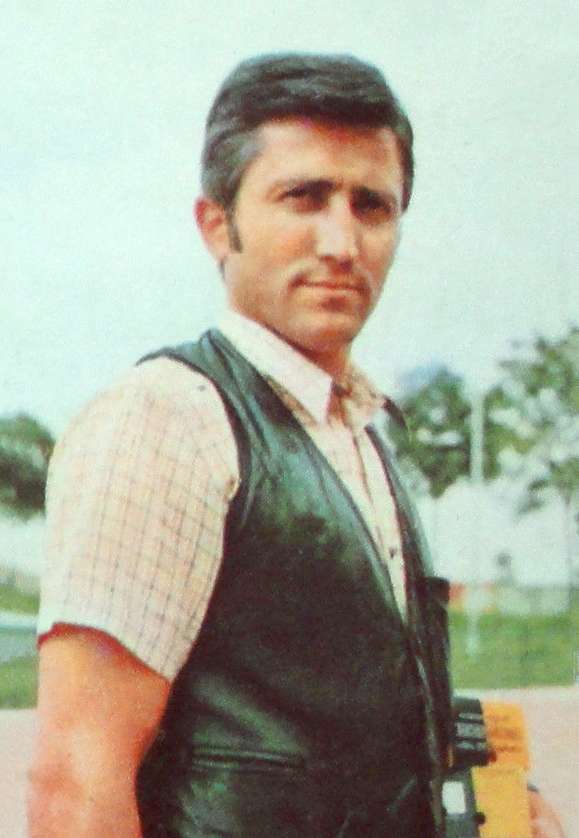

Personal information
- Born: 6 June 1937 Modena, Italy
- Died: 30 January 1999 (aged 61) Modena, Italy
- Height: 1.74 m (5 ft 9 in)
- Weight: 69 kg (152 lb)
Medal record
Representing Italy
Shooting
Olympic Games
Silver medal – second place	1968 Mexico City	Skeet
World Championships
Bronze medal – third place	1969 San Sebastian	Skeet
Bronze medal – third place	1969 Seoul	Skeet
Mediterranean Games
Gold medal – first place	1971 Izmir	Skeet
Bronze medal – third place	1975 Algiers	Skeet

Romano Garagnani (6 June 1937 – 30 January 1999) was an Italian skeet shooter. He competed at the 1968, 1976, 1980 and 1984 Olympics and won a silver medal in 1968. Garagnani also won bronze medals at the 1969 and 1978 world championships and a European title in 1977, as well as two medals at the Mediterranean Games (1971 and 1975) and five Italian titles. In 1980, before the Moscow Olympics he shot 200 out of 200 in a local competition, but finished only 28th at the Olympics.
