= Bruno Rossetti =

Italian sport shooter (1960–2018)

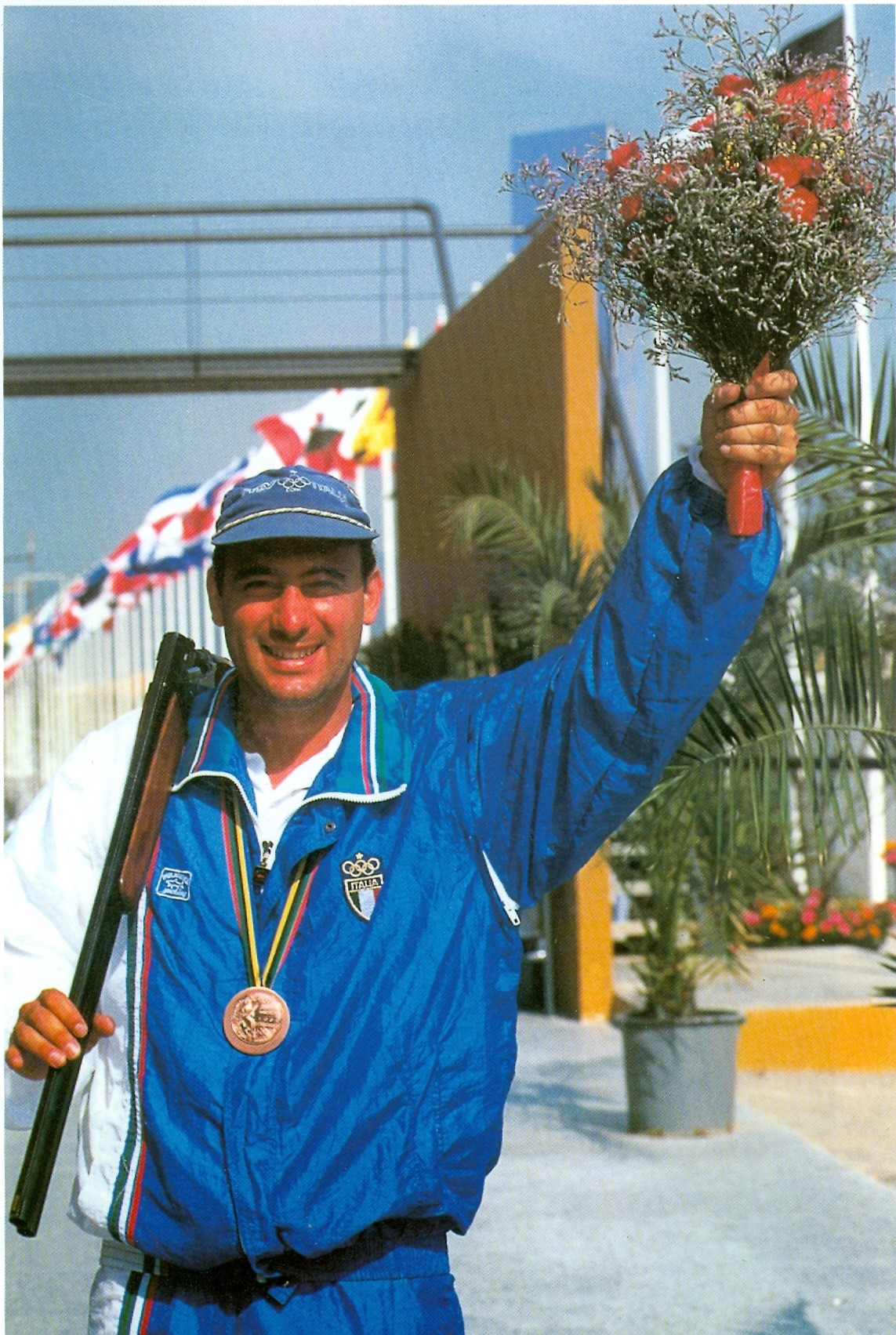

Personal information
- Full name: Bruno Mario Rossetti
- Born: 9 October 1960 Troyes, Aube, France
- Died: 8 February 2018 (aged 57) Ponte Buggianese, Italy
Medal record
Men's shooting
Representing Italy
Olympic Games
| Bronze medal – third place | 1992 Barcelona | Skeet |

Bruno Mario Rossetti (9 October 1960 – 8 February 2018) was an Italian sport shooter and Olympic medalist. He received a bronze medal in skeet shooting at the 1992 Summer Olympics in Barcelona. Rossetti was born in Troyes, Aube, France.

His son is Gabriele Rossetti, a gold medalist in shooting at the 2016 Summer Olympics.

Olympic results
| Event | 1992 | 1996 |
|---|---|---|
| Skeet (mixed) | (bronze) Bronze; 148+50+24 | Not held |
| Skeet (men) | Not held | 20th 119 |
