= Valeri Timokhin =

Soviet sports shooter

Valeriy Timokhin (was born on April 15, 1959, in the small city of Shukhti, Tula district, Russian Federation.)USSR Honored Master of Sport, is an Azerbaijani sport shooter. Valeriy graduated in 1984 from Azerbaijan State University, with a degree in physical culture and sport. Valeriy Timokhin represented the USSR National team in many European and World competitions. in 1979 Valeriy won Junior World Championship, and went to earn a few medals at European, World Championships, World Cups and World Cup Finals. Valeriy Timokhin has been a World Record Holder twice- in 1989 (223 out 225) and in 1995 (124 out 125). in 2000, he was one of 5 athletes in Azerbaijan Republic to have received the coveted " Best Athlete of the Century" title. Valeriy Timokhin was working in Kuwait Shooting Federation as a National Skeet Coach at the period of 1997–2000. During this period Kuwait National Skeet team successfully participated at the ISSF World Cups and World Championships, where Abdulla Al Rashidi won two times World titles. 2000-2004 Valeriy worked at Qatar Shooting Association as a National Shotgun Coach. Several times Qatari Skeet shooters achieved high results at the Arabic, Asian competitions. Nasser Al Attiya under Valeriy's coaching was in the final at the Olympic Games in Athens and overall became 4th in Skeet event. Valeriy Timokhin immigrated to Australia in 2005, along with his wife Tatyana and daughter Kristina. From 2006 until 2008, Valeriy Timokhin was Australian National Skeet Coach and from 2008 until 2016 he was Australian National Shotgun Head Coach. At the 2016 Rio Olympic Games two of Valeriy's Greatest success stories, Catherine Skinner and Laetisha Scanlan, made the Olympic final with Catherine going on to win Gold for Australia. The success of these athletes is directly attributable to Valeriy's skill and expertise.

"Valeriy Timokhin has been responsible for creating some magical moments in Australian sport and for the sport of shooting," said Shooting Australia CEO Damien Marangon. "Catherine and Laetisha’s performances in Rio are a wonderful reflection of the diligence and dedication Valeriy has brought to his role. We wish him all the best in the next chapter of his life and we thank him for his contribution to our sport."

From 2017 Valeriy Timokhin is the National Shotgun coach in Bahrain Shooting Association, where under his coaching Bahraini Skeet shooters Hasan Mohamed and Maryam Hassani won Islamic Games in Baku ( Mix team event).Bahraini skeet shooters won many medals at the Gulf, Asian, Arabic and International competitions. Tammar Al Watt and Maryam Hassani during Valeriy's coaching won many medals at the GCC, Arabic and International tournaments. Maryam Hassani participated at the Olympic Games in Tokyo and showed 23rd result in women Skeet event. Also Maryam Hassani won Bronze medal at Islamic Games in Koniya, Turkey. Bahrain women skeet team won Bronze medal at the 2023 ISSF World Cup in Morocco, and Bronze medal at the 2023 Asian shotgun championship in Kuwait. Valeriy Timokhin have been at 9 OLYMPICS, competed as a shooter in skeet shooting events at the Summer Olympics in 1988, 1992, and 1996 and as a coach at the Summer Olympics in 2000, 2004, 2008, 2012, 2016, 2020.

== Olympic results ==
Event	1988	1992	1996
Skeet (mixed)	T-11th	T-25th	Not held
Skeet (men)	Not held		T-38th
