= Petr Málek =

Czech sport shooter (1961–2019)

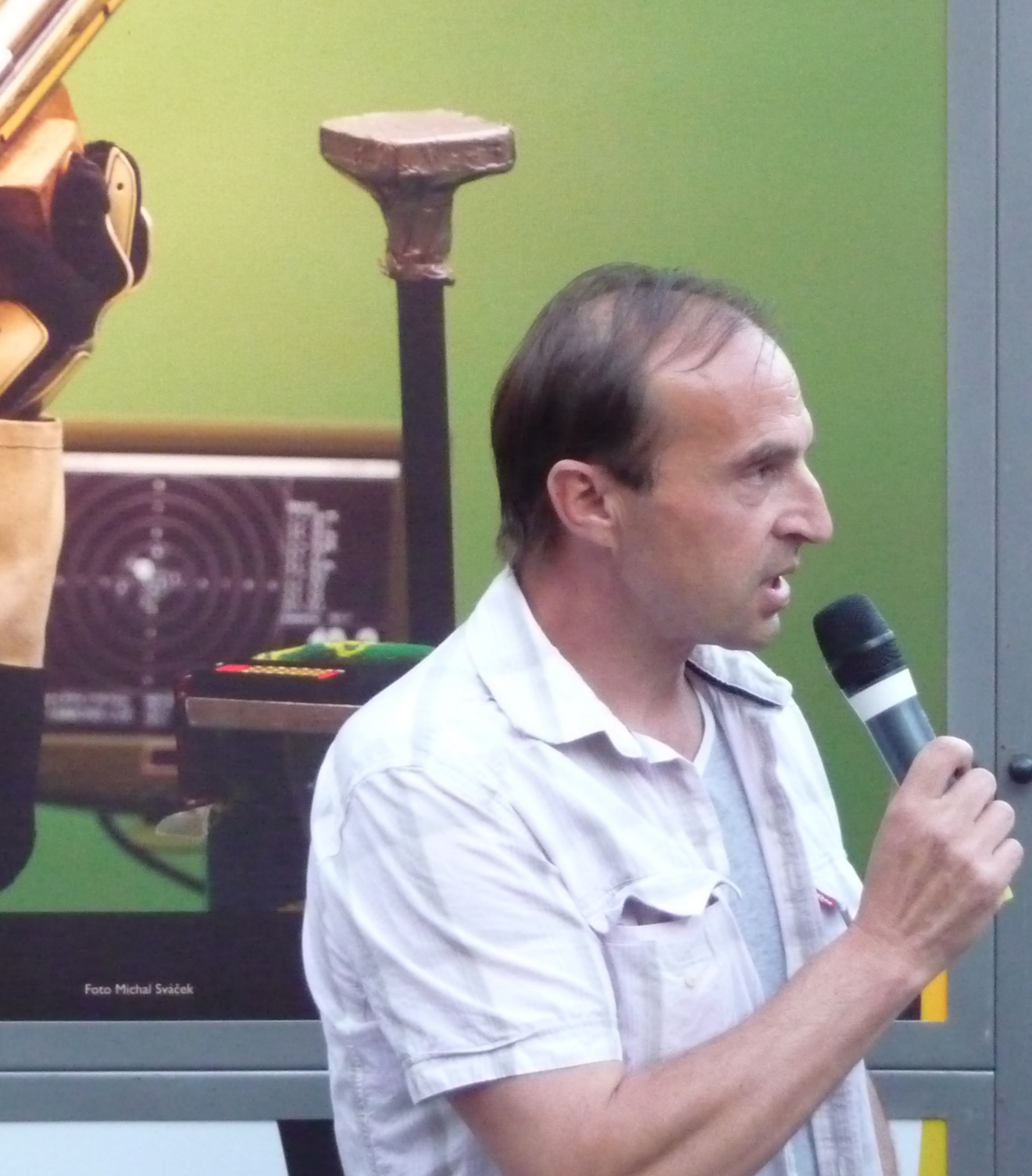
- Málek in 2011

Medal record

Men's shooting

Representing Czech Republic

Olympic Games
Silver medal – second place	2000 Sydney	Skeet

Petr Málek (Czech pronunciation: [ˈpɛtr̩ ˈmaːlɛk]; 26 November 1961 – 30 November 2019) was a Czech sport shooter. He won the silver medal in skeet at the Sydney 2000 Olympic Games. He was Cyprus coach 2002–2008 and later a private coach. He died in Kuwait, aged 58.

== Olympic results ==
Event	1988	1992	1996	2000
Skeet (mixed)	20th 145+49	—	Not held	
Skeet (men)	Not held		—	(silver) Silver; 124+24
