= Bronislav Bechyňský =

Czech sport shooter (1962–2011)

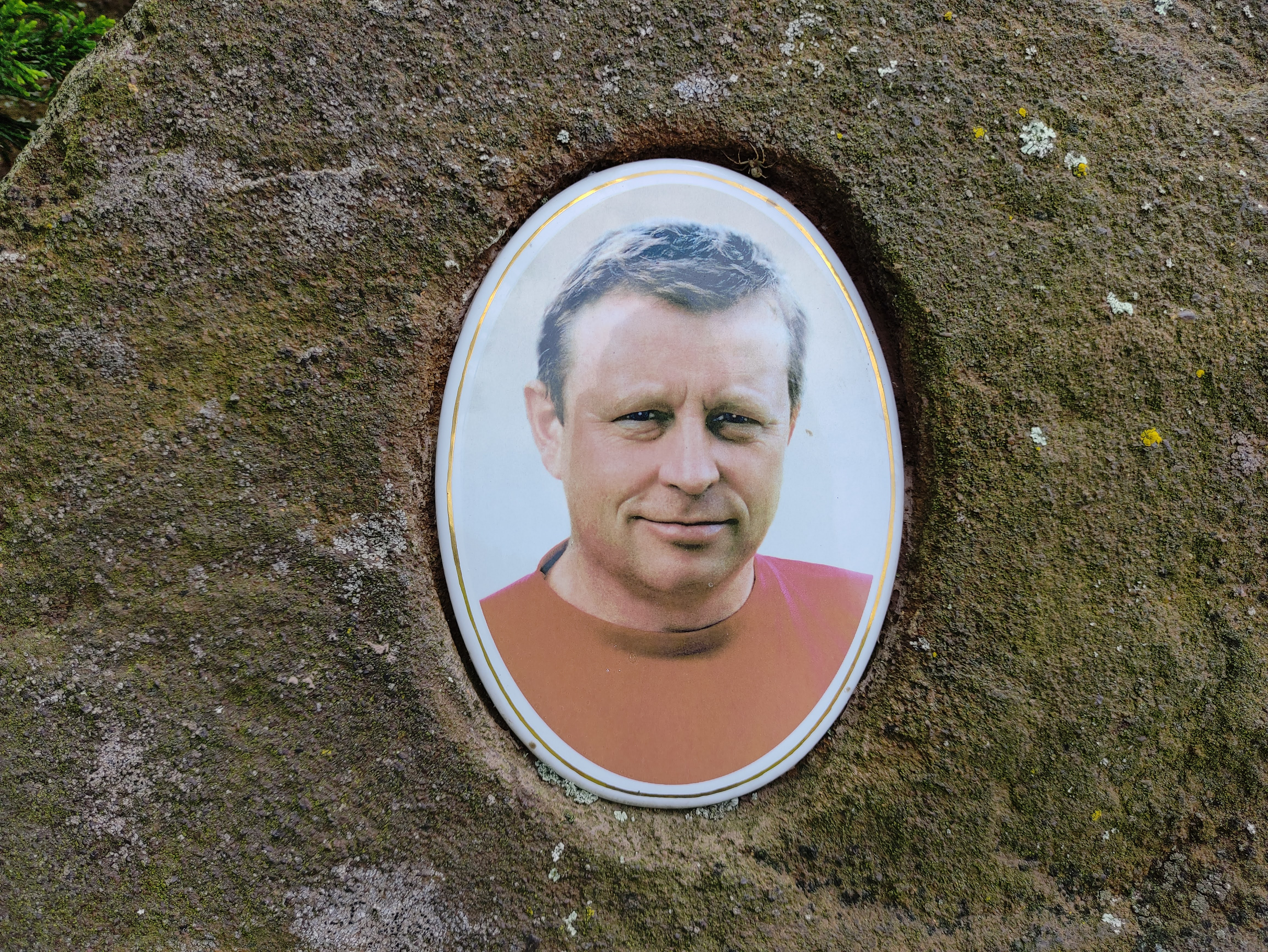
Monument to Bronislav Bechyňský in Budín Forest in Žerotín

Bronislav Bechyňský (1 January 1962 in Panenský Týnec – 22 April 2011 in Prague) was a Czech sport shooter. He competed at the 1996 and 2000 Summer Olympics in the men's skeet event, tying for 32nd place both times.

== Olympic results ==
Event	1996	2000
Skeet (men)	T-32nd	T-32nd
