= Bernhard Hochwald =

German sports shooter (born 1957)

Bernhard Hochwald (born 27 June 1957 in Schöneiche) is a German sport shooter. He competed in skeet shooting events at the Summer Olympics in 1980, 1988, 1992, and 1996. He is married to the shooter Katja Klepp and the bobsledder Raimund Bethge is his half-brother.

== Olympic results ==
Event	1980	1988	1992	1996
Skeet (mixed)	T-19th	T-11th	T-16th	Not held
Skeet (men)	Not held			T-20th
