= Svetlana Demina =

Russian sport shooter

Medal record

Women's shooting

Representing Russia

Olympic Games
Silver medal – second place	2000 Sydney	Skeet

World Championships
Gold medal – first place	1982 Caracas	Skeet
Gold medal – first place	1983 Edmonton	Skeet
Gold medal – first place	1986 Suhl	Skeet
Gold medal – first place	1990 Moscow	Skeet
Silver medal – second place	1991 Perth	Skeet
Bronze medal – third place	1979 Montecatini	Skeet
Bronze medal – third place	1994 Fagnano	Double trap
Bronze medal – third place	1999 Tampere	Skeet

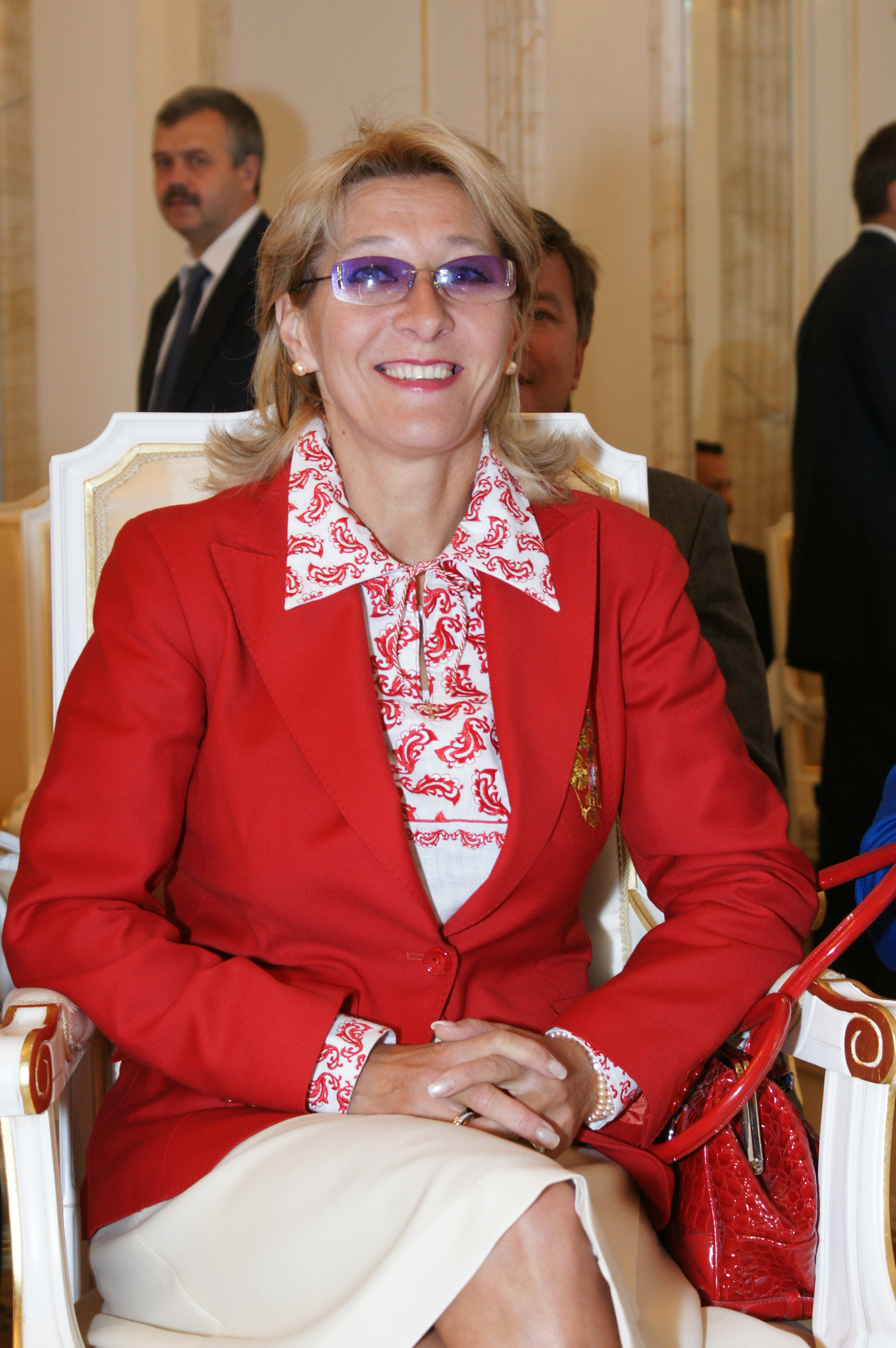
In 2008

Svetlana Aleksandrovna Demina (Russian: Светлана Александровна Демина; born April 18, 1961, in Vologda Oblast) is a Russian sport shooter, specializing in the skeet shootings event. She won the silver medal at the 2000 Olympic Games in the skeet event. She has competed at five Olympic Games: 1988, 1996, 2000, 2004 and 2008.

== Olympic results ==
Event	1988	1992	1996	2000	2004	2008
Skeet (mixed)	13th 148+47	—	Not held			
Skeet (women)	Not held			(silver) Silver; 70+25	9th 67	12th 66
Double trap (women)	Not held		17th 95	—	—	Not held
