= Shooting at the 2004 Summer Olympics – Women's skeet =

Women's skeet at the Games of the XXVIII Olympiad
- Venue: Markópoulo Olympic Shooting; Centre
- Date: August 19, 2004
- Competitors: 12 from 11 nations
- Winning score: 97

Medalists
1st place, gold medalist(s)		Diána Igaly	Hungary
2nd place, silver medalist(s)		Wei Ning	China
3rd place, bronze medalist(s)		Zemfira Meftahatdinova	Azerbaijan

The women's skeet shooting competition at the 2004 Summer Olympics was held on August 19 at the Markópoulo Olympic Shooting Centre near Athens, Greece.

The event consisted of two rounds: a qualifier and a final. In the qualifier, each shooter fired 3 sets of 25 shots in the set order of skeet shooting.

The top 6 shooters in the qualifying round moved on to the final round. There, they fired one additional round of 25. The total score from all 100 shots was used to determine the final ranking. Ties are broken using a shoot-off; additional shots are fired one at a time until there is no longer a tie.

Hungarian shooter and 2000 Olympic bronze medalist Diána Igaly set a perfect 25 to claim the gold medal in the final, finishing with a total score of 97. China's Wei Ning had shared a total score of 93 birds with defending Olympic champion Zemfira Meftahatdinova of Azerbaijan, until she chased her rival in a 2 to 1 shoot-off to grab the silver, leaving Meftahatdinova with a bronze.

== Records ==
Prior to this competition, the existing world and Olympic records were as follows.

Qualification records
World record	Svetlana Demina (RUS)	75	Kumamoto, Japan	1 June 1999
Olympic record	Zemfira Meftahatdinova (AZE)	73	Sydney, Australia	21 September 2000

Final records
World record	Svetlana Demina (RUS)	99 (75+24)	Kumamoto, Japan	1 June 1999
Olympic record	Zemfira Meftahatdinova (AZE)	98 (73+25)	Sydney, Australia	21 September 2000

== Qualification round ==
Rank	Athlete	Country	1	2	3	Total	SO 1	SO 2	Notes
1	Diána Igaly	Hungary	23	24	25	72			Q
2	Zemfira Meftahatdinova	Azerbaijan	25	24	22	71			Q
3	Wei Ning	China	22	24	24	70			Q
4	Lauryn Mark	Australia	24	22	23	69			Q
5	Connie Smotek	United States	24	22	22	68	2		Q
6	Kim Rhode	United States	24	20	24	68	1	2	Q
7	Ri Hyon-ok	North Korea	24	22	22	68	1	1	
8	Chiara Cainero	Italy	24	19	24	67			
9	Svetlana Demina	Russia	23	21	23	67			
9	Kim Yeun-hee	South Korea	24	21	22	67			
9	Maarit Lepomäki	Finland	23	22	22	67			
12	Andrea Stranovská	Slovakia	23	22	21	66			

Q Qualified for final — SO 1 Shoot-off for fifth place — SO 2 Shoot-off for sixth place

== Final ==
Rank	Athlete	Qual	Final	Total	Shoot-off
1st place, gold medalist(s)	Diána Igaly (HUN)	72	25	97	
2nd place, silver medalist(s)	Wei Ning (CHN)	70	23	93	2
3rd place, bronze medalist(s)	Zemfira Meftahatdinova (AZE)	71	22	93	1
4	Lauryn Mark (AUS)	69	23	92	
5	Kim Rhode (USA)	68	23	91	
6	Connie Smotek (USA)	68	22	90	
