= Andrea Stranovská =

Slovak sports shooter

Personal information
- Full name: Andrea Stranovská
- Nationality: Slovakia
- Born: 9 May 1970 (age 56) Trnava, Czechoslovakia
- Home town: Lošonec, Slovakia
- Height: 1.86 m (6 ft 1 in)
- Weight: 80 kg (176 lb)

Sport
- Sport: Shooting
- Event: Skeet (SK75)
- Club: SSSR MV SR Bratislava
- Coached by: Juraj Sedlak
Medal record
Women's shooting
Representing Slovakia
World Championships
Silver medal – second place	2002 Lahti	SK75
Silver medal – second place	2005 Lonato	team SK75
Silver medal – second place	2014 Granada	team SK75
Bronze medal – third place	1998 Barcelona	SK75
Bronze medal – third place	2011 Belgrade	team SK75
European Championships
Gold medal – first place	1990 Uddevalla	junior SKW
Gold medal – first place	2006 Maribor	team SK75
Gold medal – first place	2014 Sarlóspuszta	team SK75
Gold medal – first place	2015 Maribor	team SK75
Silver medal – second place	1998 Nicosia	SK75
Silver medal – second place	2011 Belgrade	team SK75
Bronze medal – third place	2007 Granada	team SK75
Bronze medal – third place	2013 Suhl	team SK75
Bronze medal – third place	2016 Lonato	team SK75

Andrea Stranovská (born 9 May 1970 in Trnava) is a Slovak sport shooter. She produced a career tally of two medals (one silver and one bronze) at the World Championships (1998 and 2002), and was selected to compete for Slovakia in two editions of the Olympic Games (2000 and 2004). Having started the sport since the age of 14, Stranovska trained as a member of the shooting team for the Slovak Republic State Sport Representation Centre of Interior Ministry (Slovak: Stredisko štátnej športovej reprezentácie MV SR) in Bratislava under personal coach Juraj Sedlak.

Stranovska's major Olympic debut came at the 2000 Summer Olympics in Sydney, where she wound up to last from a field of 13 shooters in the inaugural women's skeet with a score of 66 out of 75 hits.

In 2002, Stranovska reached the peak of her shooting career, as she picked up a skeet silver medal at the World Championships in Lahti, Finland, and then continued to flourish her success by striking the gold at the World Cup meet in Shanghai, China. Finishing atop of the podium, Stranovska also secured a quota place on her Slovak team for the Olympics.

At the 2004 Summer Olympics in Athens, Stranovska qualified for her second Slovak squad, as a 34-year-old, in the women's skeet by having registered a minimum qualifying score of 72 and finishing first from the 2002 ISSF World Cup meet in Shanghai. Stranovska aggregated a total record of 66 out of 75 clay targets in the prelims, but maintained her position from the previous Games, rounding her off again to last in a field of twelve shooters.
