= Wei Ning =

Chinese sport shooter

Medal record

Women's shooting

Representing China

Olympic Games
Silver medal – second place	2004 Athens	Skeet
Silver medal – second place	2012 London	Skeet

Asian Championships
Gold medal – first place	2012 Doha	Skeet team
Silver medal – second place	2007 Kuwait City	Skeet team
Silver medal – second place	2012 Doha	Skeet
Silver medal – second place	2015 Kuwait City	Skeet team
Bronze medal – third place	2015 Kuwait City	Skeet

Asian Shotgun Championships
Silver medal – second place	2022 Almaty	Skeet
Silver medal – second place	2022 Almaty	Mixed skeet team
Bronze medal – third place	2022 Almaty	Skeet team

Wei Ning (Chinese: 魏宁; pinyin: Wèi Níng; born August 5, 1982, in Laizhou, Yantai, Shandong) is a female Chinese sports shooter. She competed in the 2004 Summer Olympics where she won the silver medal in the women's skeet competition. In the 2008 Olympics in Beijing she reached the final of the six best but could not win a medal. At the 2012 Summer Olympics, she again won the silver medal in the women's skeet.

Wei Ning is one of the outstanding Skeet shots in the World. She won the World Championships in 2003 and won the silver medal in 2007 and 2010. She won the World Cup Final three times in 2001, 2002 and 2004. Wei won six World Cups and finished on the podium eight more times, most recently at the World Cup in Concepcion Chile in March 2011.

Wei Ning won a gold medal at the 2010 Asian Games in Guangzhou and a silver medal at the 2006 Asian Games.

It is her trademark that she usually wears white golf gloves in competitions.

Current world records held in skeet
Women	Teams	214	China (Wei, Yu, Zhang)	September 5, 2007	Nicosia (CYP)

== See also ==
- China at the 2012 Summer Olympics
