= Diána Igaly =

Hungarian sport shooter (1965–2021)

Olympic medal record

Representing Hungary

Women's shooting
| Gold medal – first place | 2004 Athens | Skeet |
| Bronze medal – third place | 2000 Sydney | Skeet |

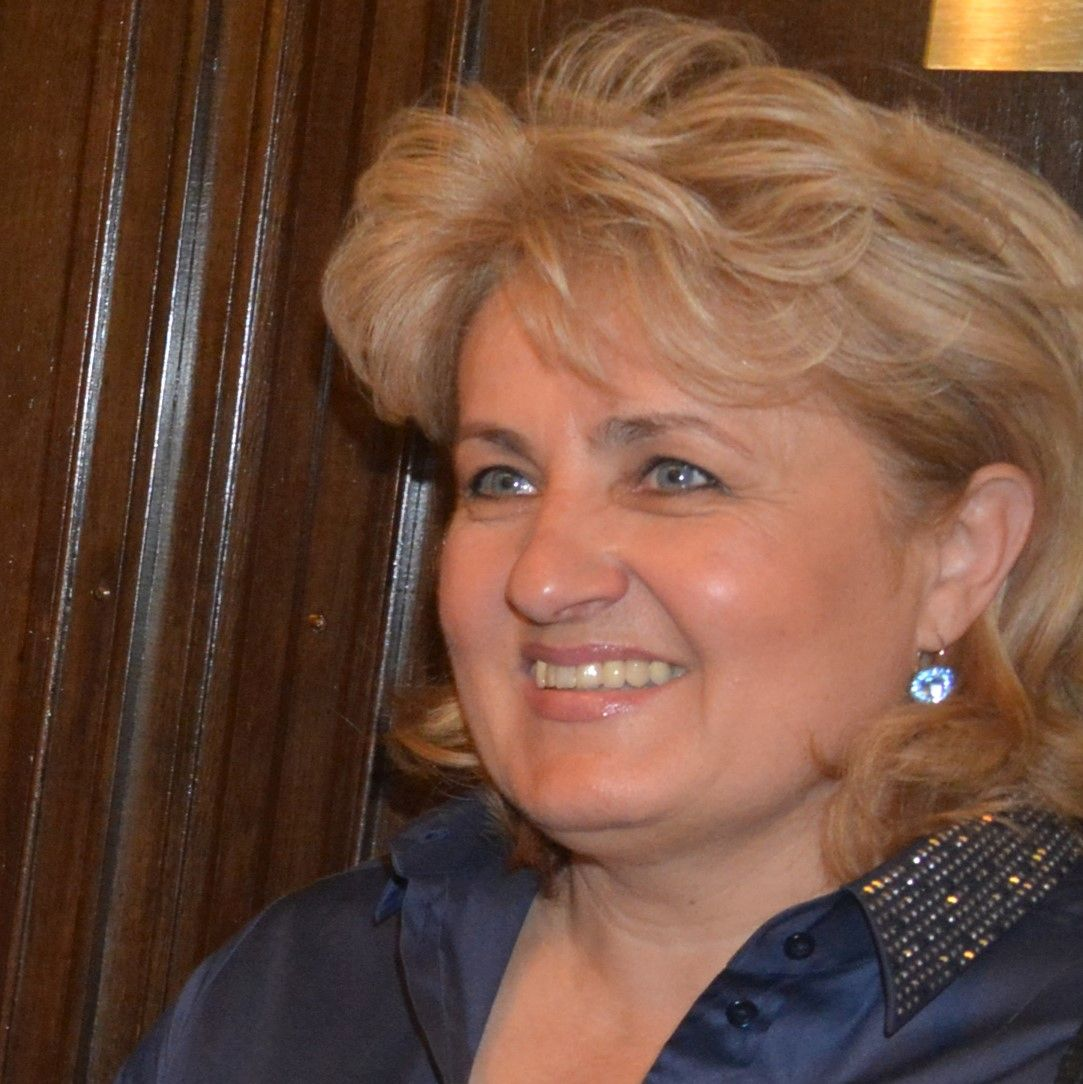
Igaly Diána (2017)

Diána Igaly (31 January 1965 – 8 April 2021) was a Hungarian sport shooter who won two Olympic medals in skeet. She was born in Budapest, where she later died from COVID-19, during the COVID-19 pandemic in Hungary.

Olympic results
| Event | 1992 | 1996 | 2000 | 2004 | 2008 |
|---|---|---|---|---|---|
| Skeet (mixed) | 42nd 143 | Not held | | | |
| Skeet (women) | Not held | | (bronze) Bronze; 71+22 | (gold) Gold; 72+25 | 13th 66 |
