= Luboš Adamec =

Czech sport shooter (1959–2025)

Luboš Adamec (18 April 1959 – 15 September 2025) was a Czech sport shooter. He competed at the Summer Olympics in 1988 and 1992. In 1988, he tied for 27th place in the mixed skeet event, and in 1992, he tied for 11th place in the mixed skeet event. Adamec was born in Ústí nad Orlicí on 18 April 1959, and died on 15 September 2025, at the age of 66.
