= Pietro Genga =

Italian sports shooter

Pietro Genga (born January 9, 1971, in Taranto) is an Italian sport shooter. He competed at the 2000 Summer Olympics in the men's skeet event, in which he tied for 39th place.
