= Jean-François Petitpied =

French sports shooter

Personal information
- Born: 18 December 1941 (age 84)

Sport
- Sport: Sports shooting

Jean-François Petitpied (born 18 December 1941) is a French former sports shooter. He competed at the 1976 Summer Olympics.
