= Ennio Falco =

Italian sport shooter

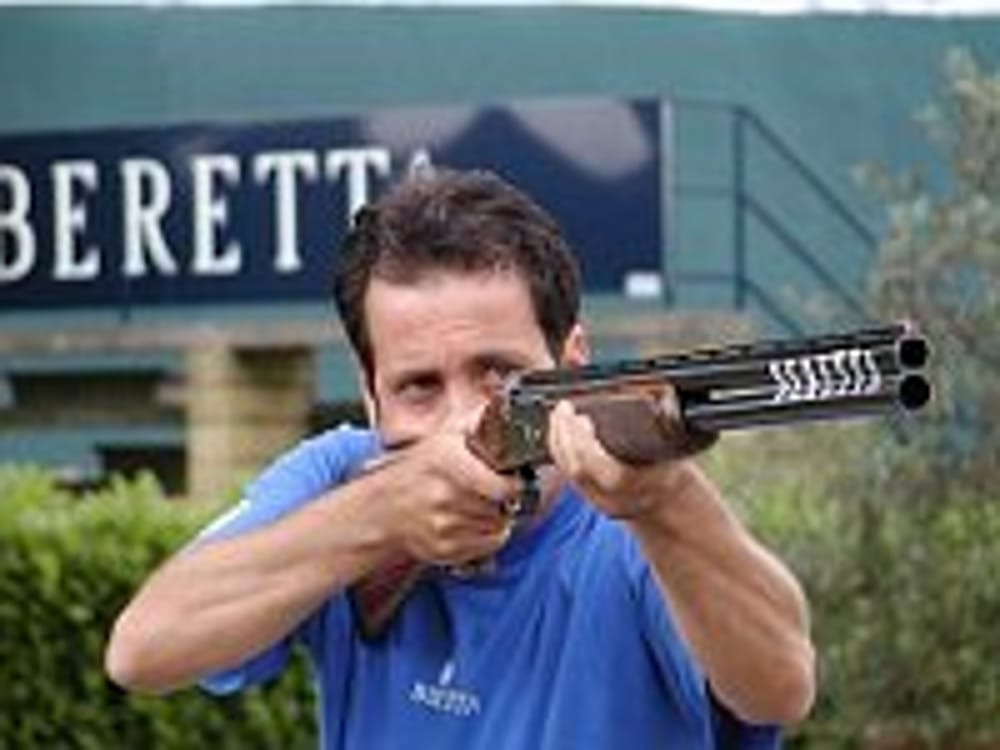

Personal information
- National team: Italy
- Born: 3 January 1968 (age 58) Capua, Italy
- Height: 1.66 m (5 ft 5 in)
- Weight: 63 kg (139 lb)

Sport
- Sport: Shooting
- Event: Skeet
- Club: G.S. Forestale
- Start activity: 1983
- Retired: 2001
Medal record
Individual
Event	1st	2nd	3rd
Olympic Games	1	0	0
World Championships	0	5	3
World Cup Final	5	3	2
World Cup	10	7	6
European Championships	5	3	1
Total	21	18	12
Olympic Games
Gold medal – first place	1996 Atlanta	Skeet
ISSF World Championships
Silver medal – second place	2013 Lima	Skeet
Mediterranean Games
Gold medal – first place	2005 Almería	Skeet

Ennio Falco (born 3 January 1968) is a former Italian sport shooter and Olympic champion. He won a gold medal in skeet shooting in the 1996 Summer Olympics in Atlanta.

== Biography ==
Falco has three silver medals from the World Championships in Skeet Shooting, from 1997, 2001 and 2005, as well as bronze medals from 1994 and 2002.

== Olympic results ==
Event	1996	2000	2004	2008	2012
Skeet	(gold) Gold; 125+24	14th 121	21st 119	14th 117	14th 118

== See also ==
- World Cup Multi-Medalists
