= John Satterwhite =

American sport shooter

John Satterwhite (December 2, 1943 – August 21, 2014) was an American Olympic shooter and World Championship skeet shooter. Satterwhite was captain of the 1976 United States Olympic and 1979 World Championship teams. Prior to his skeet shooting career, he served in the United States Air Force, where he taught survival shooting to aircrew and instructed in rifle and pistols. Until his death, Satterwhite was a consultant to law enforcement agencies, the Federal Bureau of Investigation and the United States Navy Crises Response teams.

Born John Charles Satterwhite in Hattiesburg, Mississippi, he was the only child of John Floyd Satterwhite and Beulah Mae (Boots) Satterwhite. John spent his formative years in Tupelo, Mississippi, and graduated from Tupelo High School in 1961.

John had many interests and accomplishments related to shooting and the outdoors. His shooting accomplishments are legendary. He was an Air Force Marksmanship Instructor and trained thousands of servicemen in rifle and pistol marksmanship including many B-52 and KC-135 crews during the Vietnam War. He served as a consultant to Law-Enforcement agencies, Special Weapons and Tactics Teams, and U.S. Navy Crisis Response Teams. He was the All Armed Forces National Skeet Champion in 1968 and the All Armed Forces International Style Champion in 1975. John was also a four time United States International Skeet Champion in 1968, 1974, 1975, and 1976. In 1979, he was a member of the World Championship and World Record holding U.S. Skeet team in Montacatini, Italy. He was also the Captain of two U.S. Pan American Shooting teams (1975 and 1979), the 1976 Olympic Shooting Team, and the 1979 U.S. World Shooting Championships team. Among many individual shooting honors, he was for many years the U.S. High Average leader in International Skeet, the 20 Gauge National High Average leader in the NSSA (American Style Skeet), a member of several military All-American shooting teams, and won 12 medals in International and World Competitions 6 of which were Gold.

He is one of the Legends of Sport featured in The Olympic Room in the Mississippi Sports Hall of Fame and was inducted into the Legends of the Outdoors Hall of Fame in Nashville, Tennessee in 1975.

A few months before his death, John retired from the State of Mississippi's Department of Wildlife, Fisheries and Parks, where he had served for several years as the Shooting Sports Coordinator for the State of Mississippi. In this role, John was Mississippi's ambassador at large for shooting and the sporting life.
