= Terry Carlisle =

American sports shooter

Personal information
- Nationality: American
- Born: August 24, 1954 (age 70); Downey, California, United States

Sport
- Sport: Sports shooting

Terry Carlisle (born August 24, 1954) is an American sports shooter. She competed in the mixed skeet event at the 1988 Summer Olympics.
