= Stéphane Tyssier =

French sports shooter

Personal information
- Nationality: French
- Born: 1 September 1959 (age 65); Paris, France

Sport
- Sport: Sports shooting

Stéphane Tyssier (born 1 September 1959) is a French sports shooter. He competed at the 1984 Summer Olympics, the 1988 Summer Olympics and the 1992 Summer Olympics.
