= Erik Watndal =

Norwegian sport shooter (born 1979)

Personal information
- Born: 27 August 1979 (age 46) Oslo, Norway
- Height: 1.82 m (6 ft 0 in)
- Weight: 75 kg (165 lb)

Sport
- Country: Norway
- Sport: Shooting
- Event: Skeet
Medal record
World Championships
Silver medal – second place	2018 Changwon	Skeet

Erik Watndal (born 27 August 1979) is a sport shooter who represented Norway at the 2004 Summer Olympics, where he participated in the men's skeet event and finished tied for eighth position.
