= Tamaz Imnaishvili =

Georgian sports shooter

Tamaz Imnaishvili (born July 28, 1954 in Tbilisi) is a Georgian sport shooter. He competed in skeet shooting events at the Summer Olympics in 1980 and 1988 for the Soviet Union and in 1996 for Georgia.

== Olympic results ==
Event	1980	1988	1996
Skeet (mixed)	9th	25th (DNF)	Not held
Skeet (men)	Not held		T-7th
