= Wiesław Gawlikowski =

Polish sport shooter (born 1951)

Personal information
- Born: 2 July 1951 (age 75) Kraków, Poland

Sport
- Sport: Sports shooting
Medal record
Men's shooting
Representing Poland
Olympic Games
Bronze medal – third place	1976 Montreal	Skeet

Wiesław Witold Gawlikowski (born 2 July 1951) is a Polish sport shooter. He was born in Kraków. He won a bronze medal in skeet at the 1976 Summer Olympics in Montreal.
