= Peeter Päkk =

Estonian sports shooter

Personal information
- Nationality: Estonian
- Born: 26 November 1957 (age 68) Tartu, then part of Estonian SSR, Soviet Union

Sport
- Sport: Sports shooting

Peeter Päkk (born 26 November 1957) is an Estonian sports shooter. He competed in the mixed skeet event at the 1992 Summer Olympics.
