= Juan García (sport shooter) =

Spanish sport shooter

Personal information
- Born: 12 April 1934 (age 92) Madrid, Spain

Sport
- Sport: Sports shooting

Juan García (born 12 April 1934) is a Spanish former sports shooter. He competed at the 1964 Summer Olympics and the 1968 Summer Olympics.
