= Nikolai Tiopliy =

Russian sport shooter

Nikolai Tiopliy (born May 21, 1957 in Kemerovo Oblast) is a Russian sport shooter. He competed at the 1996 and 2000 Summer Olympics. In 1996, he placed fifth in the men's skeet event, while in 2000, he tied for 23rd place in the men's skeet event.
