= Matthew Dryke =

American sport shooter (born 1958)

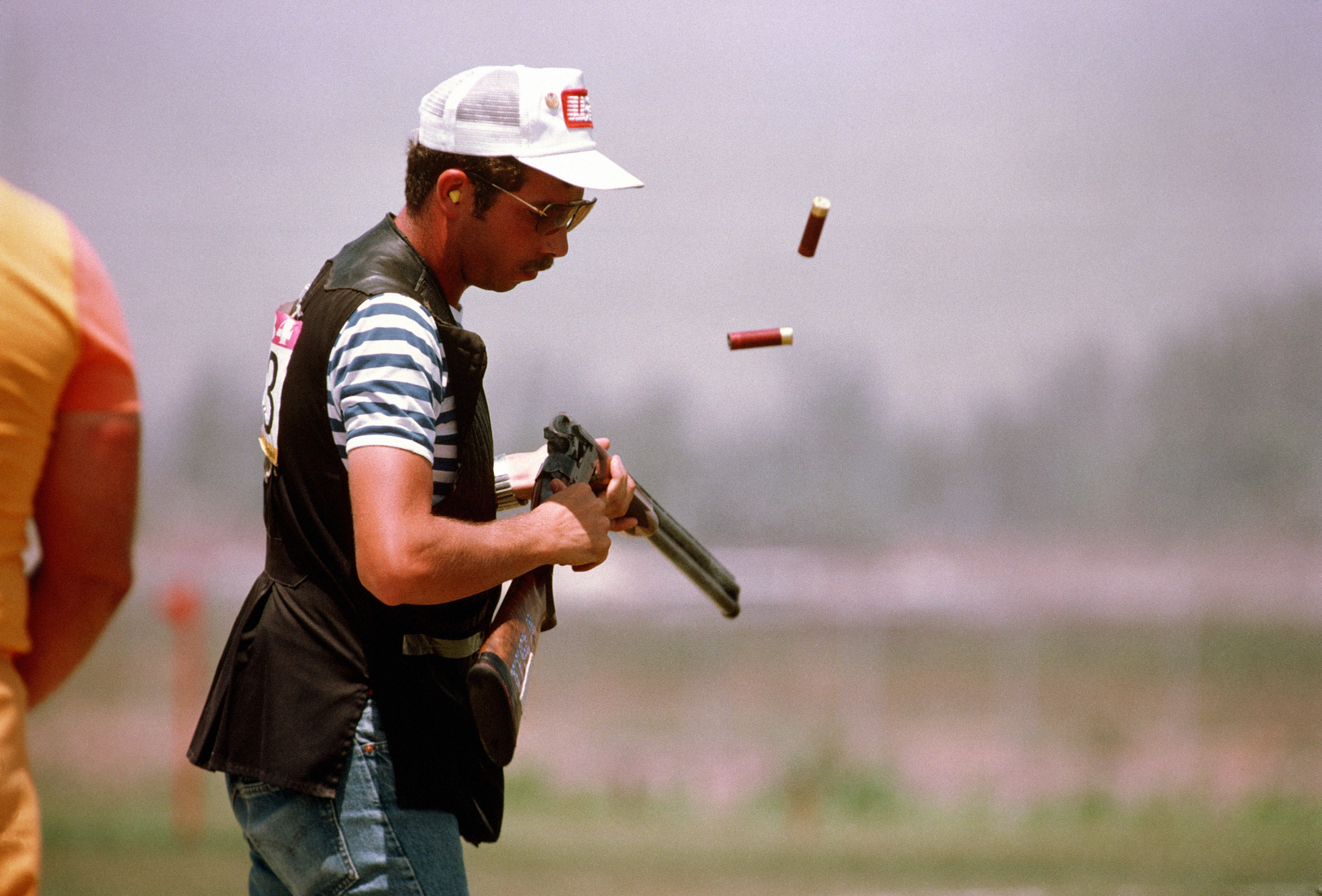
- Dryke in 1984

Personal information
- Full name: Matthew Alexander Dryke
- Born: August 21, 1958 (age 67) Port Angeles, Washington, U.S.
Medal record
Men's shooting
Representing the United States
Olympic Games
Gold medal – first place	1984 Los Angeles	Skeet

Matthew Alexander Dryke (born August 21, 1958, in Port Angeles, Washington) is an American former sport shooter. He competed and won a gold medal in the 1984 Summer Olympics. He is a two-time world champion in skeet shooting, from 1983 and 1986, and earned a silver medal in 1987.

Dryke has been inducted into the USA Shooting Hall of fame.

== Accomplishments ==
- 1979 Pan American Games – silver – skeet
- 1979 Pan American Games – gold team – skeet
- 1979 World Moving Target Championships – gold team – skeet (world record – team)
- 1981 Championships of the Americas – gold – skeet (world record)
- 1981 Championships of the Americas – gold team – skeet (world record – team)
- 1982 World Shooting Championships – gold team – skeet
- 1983 Pan American Games – gold – skeet (world record)
- 1983 World Moving Target Championships – gold – skeet
- 1983 World Moving Target Championships – gold team – skeet
- 1984 Olympic Games – gold – skeet
- 1985 Championships of the Americas – gold – skeet
- 1986 World Shooting Championships – gold – skeet (world record)
- 1987 Pan American Games – gold – skeet
- 1987 World Clay Target Championships – silver – skeet
- 1988 Olympic Games – 24th – skeet
- 1989 World Cup – Mexico City – gold – skeet
- 1989 World Cup – Osijek – gold – skeet
- (bronze) 1989 World Cup – Suhl – bronze – skeet
- 1992 World Cup – Los Angeles – gold – skeet
- 1992 Olympic Games – 6th – skeet
