= Jie Wu =

Chinese computer scientist

Jie Wu (Chinese: 吴杰; pinyin: Wú Jié) is a computer scientist. He is Chief Scientist of China Telecom and Director of China Telecom Cloud Computing Research Institute. Before he joined China Telecom, he was Laura H. Carnell Professor at Temple University and the Director of the Center for Networked Computing (CNC).

Jie Wu's research focuses on routing in wired and wireless networks. His contributions include fault-tolerant routing in hypercube-based multiprocessors, local construction of connected dominating set and its applications in mobile ad hoc networks, and efficient routing in delay tonerant networks, including social contact networks. His current research interests include mobile computing and wireless networks, routing protocols, network trust and security, distributed algorithms, applied machine learning, and cloud computing.

Jie Wu is a fellow of the AAAS, a fellow of the IEEE, a fellow of the CCF, and a Member of the Academia Europaea. He serves on several editorial boards, including IEEE/ACM Transactions on Networking. He was the general chair/cochair for IEEE IPDPS'23, ACM MobiHoc'23, and IEEE CCGrid'24 as well as program chair/cochair for IEEE INFOCOM'11 and CCF CNCC'13. He has served as the chair for the IEEE Technical Committee on Distributed Processing (TCDP).

He received 2011 China Computer Federation (CCF) Overseas Outstanding Achievements Award. He is a Fulbright Senior Specialist, an ACM Distinguished Member.

He resides in Fort Washington, Pennsylvania.
