= Nuria Ortiz =

Mexican sports shooter

Personal information
- Born: 19 April 1945 (age 81)

Sport
- Sport: Sports shooting

Nuria Ortiz (born 19 April 1945) is a Mexican former sports shooter. She competed at the 1968, 1972, 1984 and the 1988 Summer Olympics. Along with Eulalia Rolińska (Poland) and Gladys Baldwin (Peru) she was one of three women to compete in the shooting events at the 1968 Olympics.
