= Alexander Zemlin =

Russian sport shooter (born 1991)

Personal information
- Nationality: Russian
- Born: 2 January 1991 (age 35) Krasnodar, Russia
- Height: 1.81 m (5 ft 11 in)
- Weight: 58 kg (128 lb)

Sport
- Country: Russia
- Sport: Shooting
- Event: Skeet
- Club: Dubrava
Medal record
World Championships
Bronze medal – third place	2018 Changwon	Skeet team
European Championships
Silver medal – second place	2021 Osijek	Skeet team
Military World Games
Gold medal – first place	2019 Wuhan	Skeet team

Alexander Ivanovich Zemlin (Russian: Александр Иванович Землин; born 2 January 1991) is a Russian sport shooter.

He participated at the 2018 ISSF World Shooting Championships, winning a medal.
