= Michael Schmidt Jr. =

American sports shooter

Michael Schmidt Jr. (born April 15, 1958, in Decatur, Illinois) is an American sport shooter. He competed at the 2000 Summer Olympics in the men's skeet event, in which he tied for 35th place.
