= Anton Astakhov =

Russian sports shooter

Personal information
- Nationality: Russian
- Born: 30 April 1987 (age 39) Rostov-on-Don, Russia
- Height: 1.78 m (5 ft 10 in)
- Weight: 89 kg (196 lb)

Sport
- Country: Russia
- Sport: Sports shooting
- Event: Skeet
Medal record
World Championships
Bronze medal – third place	2018 Changwon	Skeet team
Military World Games
Gold medal – first place	2019 Wuhan	Skeet team
Bronze medal – third place	2019 Wuhan	Skeet

Anton Viktorovich Astakhov (Russian: Антон Викторович Астахов; born 30 April 1987) is a Russian sports shooter. He competed in the men's skeet event at the 2016 Summer Olympics.
