= Luca Scribani Rossi =

Italian sport shooter

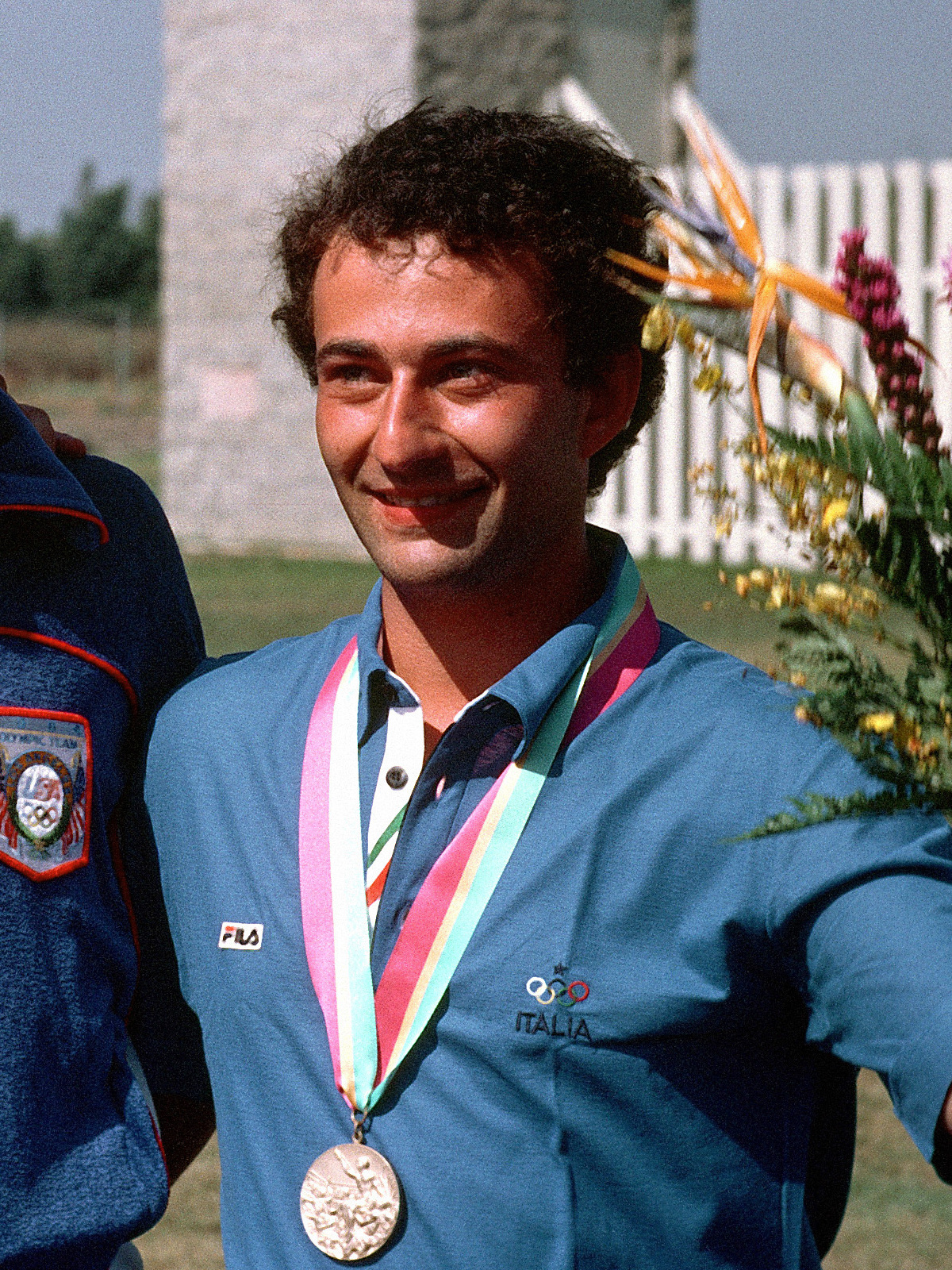
- Scribani Rossi at the 1984 Summer Olympics

Personal information
- Nationality: Italian
- Born: 29 December 1960 (age 65) Rome
- Height: 1.70 m (5 ft 7 in)
- Weight: 75 kg (165 lb)

Sport
- Sport: Shooting
- Event: Skeet
Medal record
Event	1st	2nd	3rd
Olympic Games	0	0	1
European Championships	1	1	0
Total	1	1	1
Summer Olympics
Bronze medal – third place	1984 Los Angeles	Skeet

Luca Scribani Rossi (born 29 December 1960 in Rome) is an Italian sport shooter that won a bronze medal at 1984 Summer Olympics.

== See also ==
- Italy national shooting team
