= Karsten Krogner =

Danish sports shooter (born 1961)

Personal information
- Nationality: Danish
- Born: 16 June 1961 (age 64); Holbæk, Denmark

Sport
- Sport: Sports shooting

Karsten Krogner (born 16 June 1961) is a Danish sports shooter. He competed in the mixed skeet event at the 1988 Summer Olympics.
