= Celso Giardini =

Italian sports shooter

Personal information
- Nationality: Italian
- Born: 10 June 1958 (age 66); Rome, Italy

Sport
- Sport: Sports shooting

Celso Giardini (born 10 June 1958) is an Italian sports shooter. He competed at the 1980 Summer Olympics, the 1984 Summer Olympics and the 1988 Summer Olympics.
