= Cristina Vitali =

Italian sports shooter

Cristina Vitali (born February 15, 1975, in Bergamo) is an Italian sport shooter. She competed at the 2000 Summer Olympics in the women's skeet event, in which she tied for 11th place.
