= Klaus Reschke =

German sports shooter

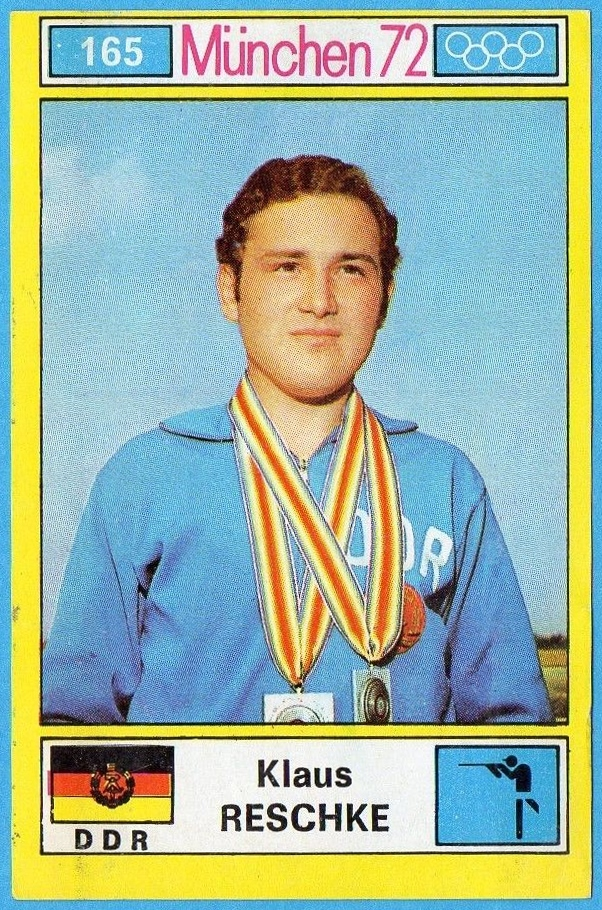

Personal information
- Born: 7 December 1953 Oberau, West Germany
- Died: 13 January 2008 (aged 54)
- Height: 184 cm (6 ft 0 in)
- Weight: 83 kg (183 lb)

Sport
- Sport: Sports shooting
- Event: Olympic skeet
- Club: GST-Klub Leipzig
Medal record
Representing East Germany
World Championships
Silver medal – second place	1971 Bologna	Individual
Silver medal – second place	1971 Bologna	Team
Gold medal – first place	1975 Munich	Team

Klaus Reschke (7 December 1953 – 13 January 2008) was an East German Olympic skeet shooter who won one gold and two silver medals at the world championships in 1971–75. He placed sixth and fourth at the 1972 and 1976 Summer Olympics, respectively.
