= Ole Justesen =

Danish sports shooter (born 1946)

Personal information
- Born: 12 June 1946 (age 80) Odsherred, Denmark

Sport
- Sport: Sports shooting

Ole Justesen (born 12 June 1946) is a Danish former sports shooter. He competed at the 1972, 1980, and 1992 Summer Olympics.

He won the world Championship in Olympic skeet 1979 with 198/200 and became vice European champion with 196/200 the same year in Montecatini Terme, Italy. In 1979 he won 2 cars: 100/100 Olympic skeet in Bremen, Germany won him a Land Rover V8, and 138/150 in 6 disciplines won him a 6-wheeler Range Rover worth 25.000£.

He won a World Cup in Suhl, East Germany 990 with 223/225, a new world record. He competed in numerous WCH, ECH, and Nordic Championship between 1971 and 1992. He also won the unofficial world championships in Marathon skeet: 1000 targets in 1 day, i.e., 40 rounds of 25.5 years, best result 982/1000.

Justesen's business career was managing wholesale companies importing cartridges and hunting guns for the Danish market.
