= Élie Pénot =

French sports shooter

Personal information
- Born: 24 January 1950 (age 76)

Sport
- Sport: Sports shooting

Élie Pénot (born 24 January 1950) is a French former sports shooter. He competed at the 1972, 1976 and the 1984 Summer Olympics.
