= Andrea Benelli =

Italian sport shooter (born 1960)

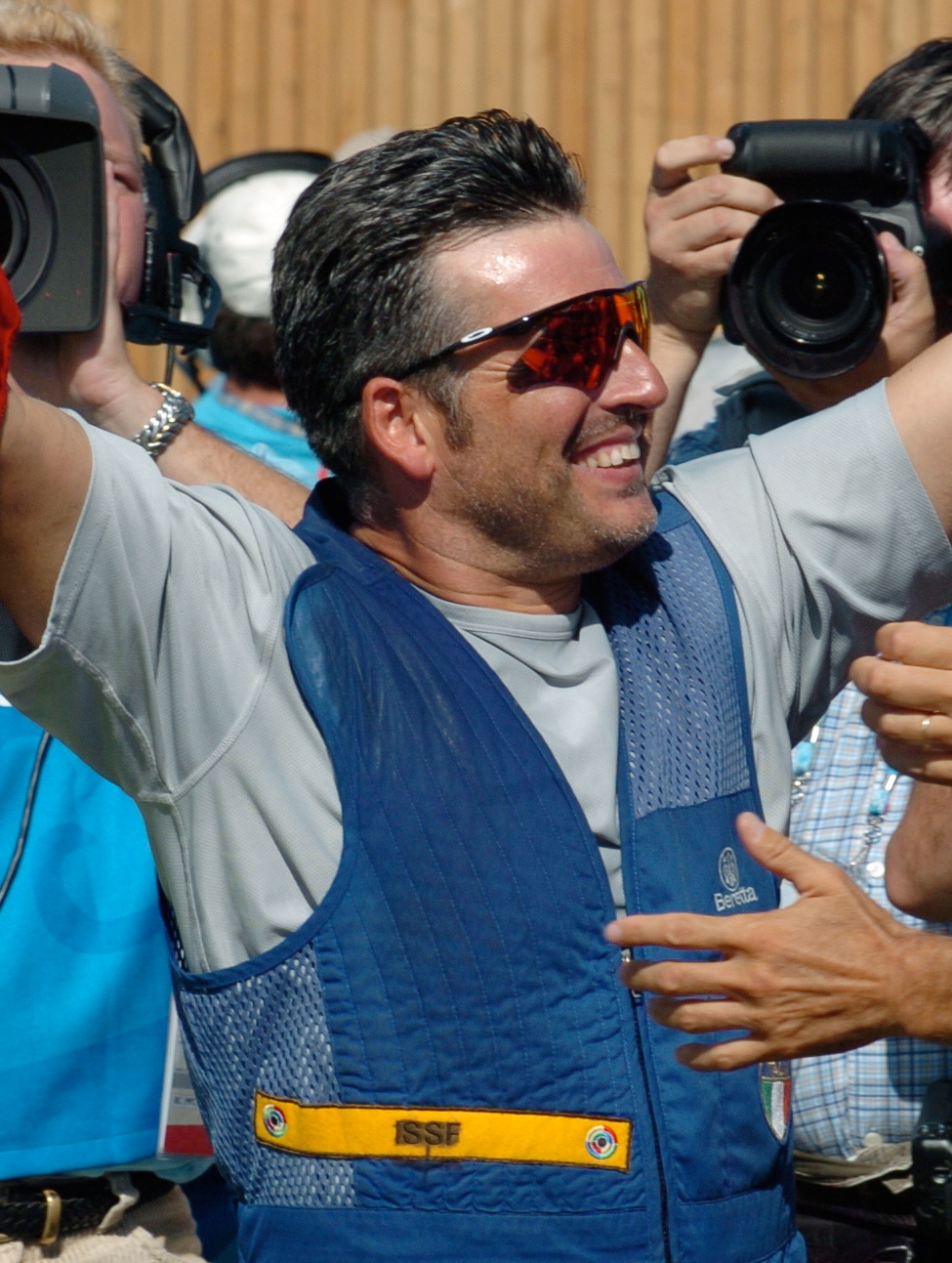
- Benelli at the 2004 Olympics

Personal information
- Nationality: Italian
- Born: 28 June 1960 (age 65) Florence, Italy
- Height: 173 cm (5 ft 8 in)
- Weight: 80 kg (176 lb)

Sport
- Sport: Shooting
- Event: Skeet
- Club: Laterina Sporting Club
Medal record
Representing Italy
Olympic Games
Gold medal – first place	2004 Athens	Skeet individual
Bronze medal – third place	1996 Atlanta	Skeet individual
World Championships
Gold medal – first place	1981 Tucuman	Skeet team
Gold medal – first place	1986 Suhl	Skeet team
Gold medal – first place	1987 Valencia	Skeet individual
Gold medal – first place	1989 Montecatini	Skeet team
Gold medal – first place	1990 Moscow	Skeet individual
Gold medal – first place	1993 Barcelona	Skeet team
Gold medal – first place	1994 Fagnano	Skeet team
Gold medal – first place	1999 Tampere	Skeet team
Gold medal – first place	2006 Zagreb	Skeet team
Silver medal – second place	1985 Montecatini	Skeet team
Silver medal – second place	1986 Suhl	Skeet individual
Silver medal – second place	1987 Valencia	Skeet team
Silver medal – second place	1995 Nicosia	Skeet team
Bronze medal – third place	1999 Tamper	Skeet individual
Bronze medal – third place	2003 Nicosia	Skeet team
Bronze medal – third place	2005 Lonato	Skeet team
Mediterranean Games
Silver medal – second place	2005 Almería	Skeet individual

Andrea Benelli (born 28 June 1960) is a retired Italian skeet shooter. He competed at the 1988, 1992, 1996, 2000, 2004 and 2008 Olympics, and won a gold medal in 2004 and a bronze in 1996. In 2004, he and Marko Kemppainen finished with 149 hits out of 150, but Kemppainen missed first in the shoot-off. Benelli also won the individual world title in 1987 and 1990, placing second in 1986, and third in 1999. In 1996 he set two world records at 125/125 and 150/150.

Benelli owns and runs a Tourist Villa named Agriturismo Petrognano, located in Saint Ellero, Florence. It is a restored 18th-century farmhouse with a practice range behind it. His father Luciano was also a competitive shooter, who won the national title in 1977.

== Olympic results ==
Event	1988	1992	1996	2000	2004	2008
Skeet (mixed)	20th 145+49	25th 145	Not held			
Skeet (men)	Not held		(bronze) Bronze; 123+24	5th 122+24	(gold) Gold; 124+25	24th 113
