= Artur Rogowski =

Polish sports shooter

Personal information
- Born: 20 January 1936 (age 90) Lwów, Poland

Sport
- Sport: Sports shooting

Artur Rogowski (born 20 January 1936) is a Polish former sports shooter. He competed in the skeet event at the 1972 Summer Olympics.
