= Konrad Wirnhier =

German sport shooter

Personal information
- Born: 7 July 1937 Pfarrkirchen, Nazi Germany
- Died: 2 June 2002 (aged 64) Tegernsee, Germany

Sport
- Sport: Sport shooting
Medal record
Men's shooting
Representing West Germany
Olympic Games
Gold medal – first place	1972 Munich	Skeet
Bronze medal – third place	1968 Mexico City	Skeet

Konrad Wirnhier (7 July 1937 – 2 June 2002) was a German sport shooter and Olympic champion. He won a gold medal in skeet shooting at the 1972 Summer Olympics in Munich.
