= James Graves (sport shooter) =

American sport shooter

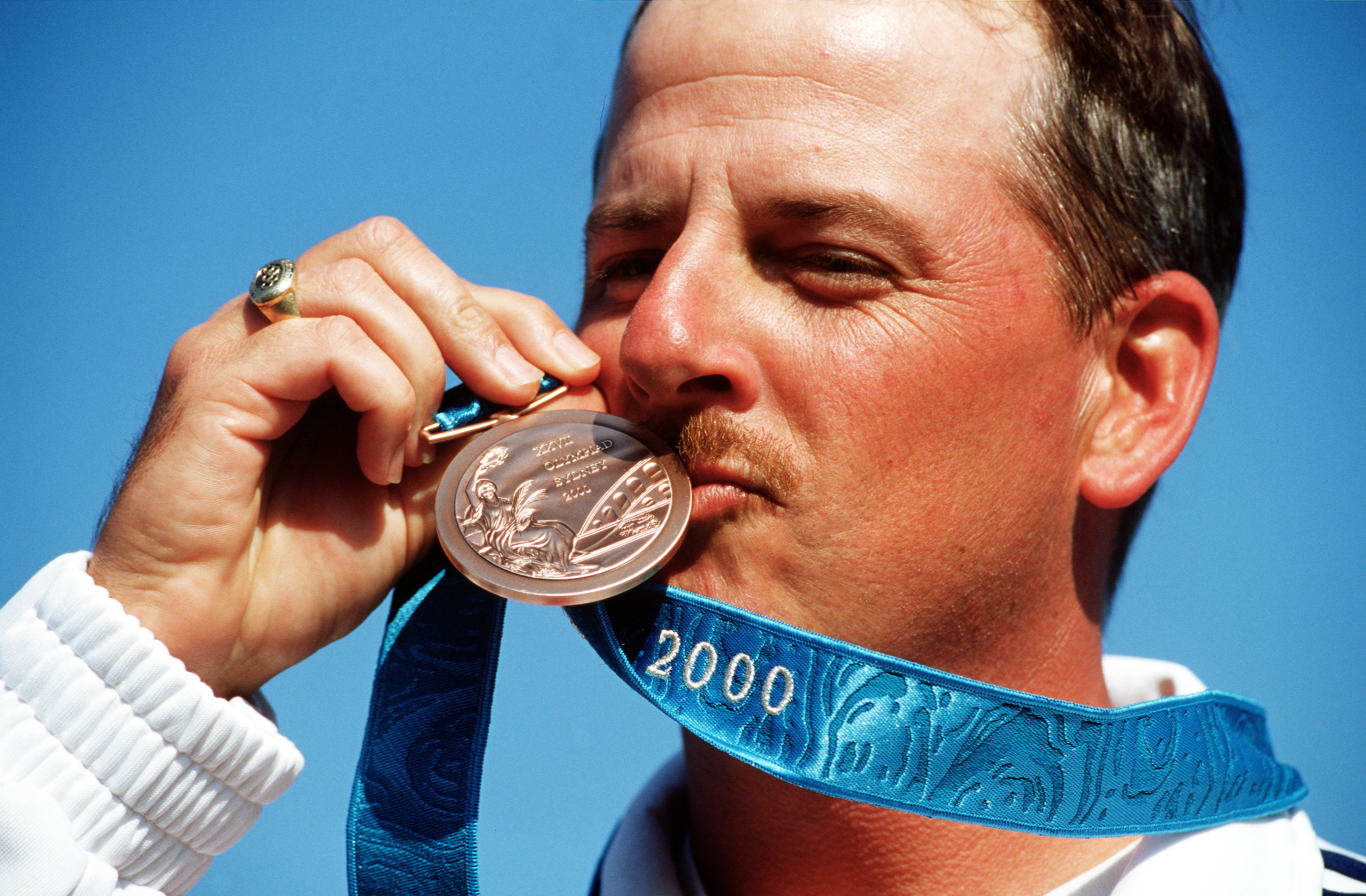
- Graves at the 2000 Olympics

Personal information
- Full name: James Todd Graves
- Born: March 27, 1963 (age 63) Ruston, Louisiana, U.S.
Medal record
Men's shooting
Representing United States
Olympic Games
Bronze medal – third place	2000 Sydney	Skeet
Pan American Games
Silver medal – second place	2007 Rio de Janeiro	Skeet

Sergeant 1st Class James "Todd" Graves' (born March 27, 1963) is an American sport shooter. He was born in Ruston, Louisiana. He won a bronze medal in skeet at the 2000 Summer Olympics in Sydney.
