= Yevgeni Petrov (sport shooter) =

Soviet sports shooter (1938–2025)

Personal information
- Born: 16 October 1938 Moscow, Russian SFSR, USSR
- Died: 18 November 2025 (aged 87) Moscow, Russia

Sport
- Sport: Sports shooting
Medal record
Men's shooting
Representing Soviet Union
Olympic Games
Gold medal – first place	1968 Mexico City	Skeet
Silver medal – second place	1972 Munich	Skeet

Yevgeny Alexandrovich Petrov (Russian: Евгений Александрович Петров; 16 October 1938 – 18 November 2025) was a Soviet sports shooter and Olympic medalist. He won a Gold medal in skeet shooting at the 1968 Summer Olympics in Mexico City, and a silver medal in 1972.

Petrov died on 18 November 2025, at the age of 87.
