= Shawn Dulohery =

American sport shooter (born 1965)

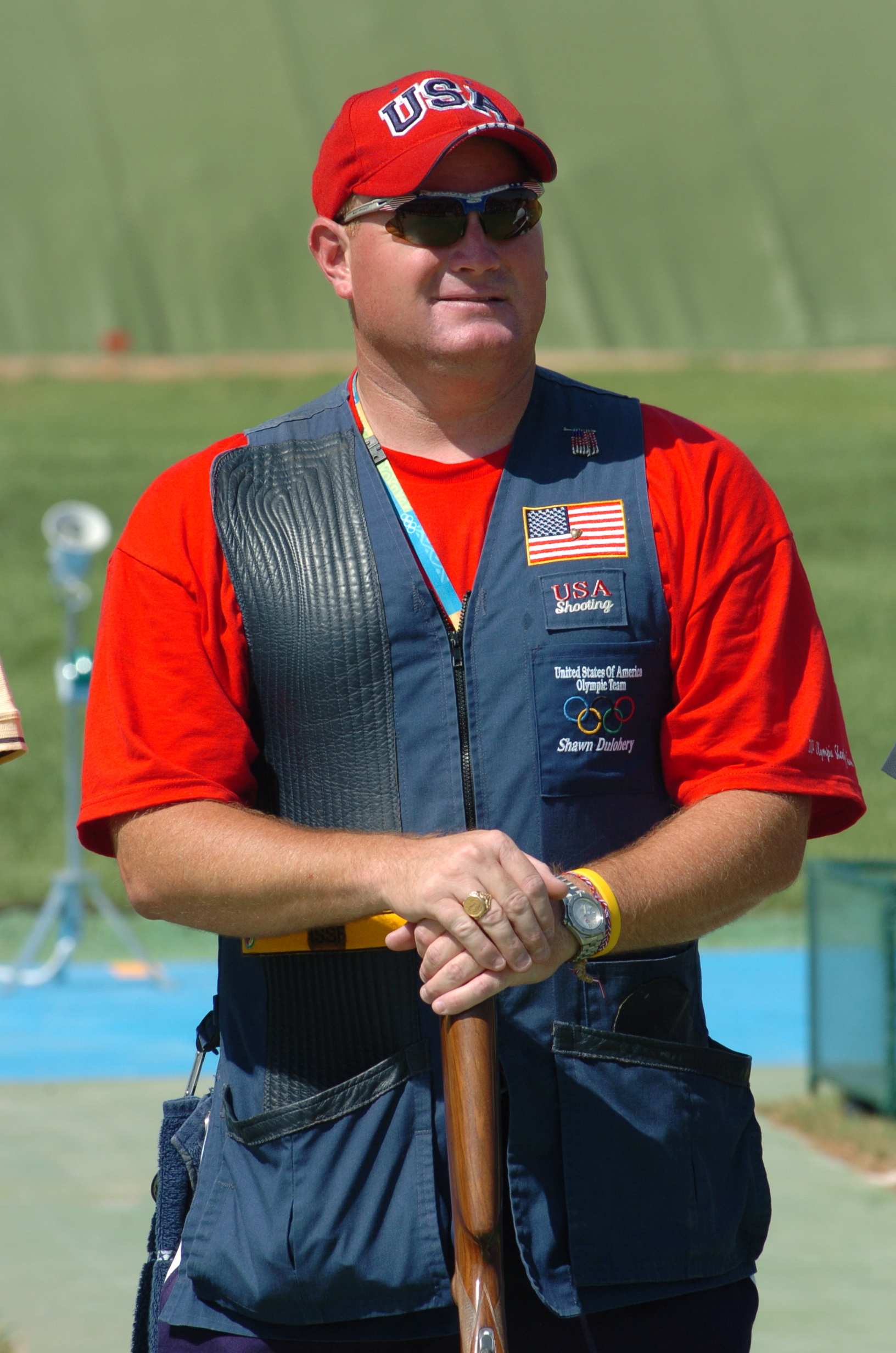
- Dulohery at the 2004 Olympics prior to losing in shootoffs

Personal information
- Born: May 4, 1965 (age 60) Kansas City, Missouri, U.S.
- Height: 182 cm (6 ft 0 in)
- Weight: 107 kg (236 lb)

Sport
- Sport: Shooting
- Event: Skeet
- Club: U.S. Army Marksmanship Unit, Fort Benning, Georgia

Shawn Dulohery (born May 4, 1965) is a retired American skeet shooter. He competed at the 2004 Olympics and placed fifth.
