= Super sporting =

Super sporting or super sporting clays is a shotgun shooting sport that is a form of clay pigeon shooting. It is similar to sporting clays, FITASC, trap, and skeet. There are typically 3 traps (target throwers) at each station. The targets are usually attempted as 3 singles, and then a report of the a/b, b/c, a/c targets or true pairs or combinations of those. There is a menu card at each shooting station which lists the targets to be shot in the order they should be shot in.

Some courses are set up to have 2 shooting stations for each set of 3 traps which can be near each other but far enough apart such that the shooting experience is different for the same set of targets, while other courses are set up with one hoop for each set of 3 traps. Typically this is only done for large events where a greater number of shooters need to get through the course. If the two hoop-method is used, a course does not need as many traps as it would if it were set up as a typical report/true pair sporting clays course of the same number of targets.

Typical targets are rabbits, chandelles, overheads, crossings, traps (outgoing), teals (launched straight up into the air), and incoming birds.

Targets can be of the following sizes/styles: standard 108 mm domed (orange, black or orange/black), midi 90 mm (orange or black), mini 60 mm (orange or black), rabbit 108 mm (orange or black), or battue 108 mm (orange or black).
