= USA High School Clay Target League =

Logo of the USA Clay Target League

The USA Clay Target League of Eagan, Minnesota, organizes and runs high school and college clay target shooting programs along with state tournaments and a yearly National Championship

It is a 501(c)(3) non-profit corporation and the independent provider of shooting sports as an extracurricular co-ed activity to high schools and colleges for students who have their firearms safety certification.

The organization oversees school-based youth trapshooting, skeet shooting, sporting clays and 5-stand leagues in 42 states.

The USA Clay Target League is the largest youth clay target shooting program in the world, with over 50,000 participants yearly. The organization's high school program - USA High School Clay Target League - runs high-school trapshooting leagues in states nationwide, the largest of which is Minnesota, where 12,000 students from nearly 450 schools compete. All teams in USACTL leagues are school-sanctioned as a prerequisite for team/league formation. The Minnesota State High School Clay Target League Championship is the largest trapshooting event in the world with over 8,000 student athletes participating in 2018.

In 2019, the USA Clay Target League launched the USA College Clay Target League, a program for 2-year and 4-year postsecondary institutions.

In 2021, the USA Clay Target League formed the USA Homeschool Clay Target League, a program specifically for homeschool students that were unable to participate in the League's high-school programs due to school or state restrictions.

The League's motto is "Safety, Fun, Marksmanship - In that order."

== League format ==
Five students is the minimum number for a team. There is no maximum number of students that can be on a team. There may be some limitations to team size because of coaching resources and/or gun club capacity. Teams are made up of students from 6th grade through 12th grade. Middle school students are eligible to participate with high school kids if the team size allows for it

Each team competes in their own conference with teams of similar team member size. A true team scoring system (similar to track and swimming) is used and a team competes against all teams within their conference each week. The highest total of points achieved by the team at the end of the competition is the winner.

== Growth ==
While the first years of the league were limited to just a handful of teams in Minnesota. It is now one of the largest sports in Minnesota High Schools.

Growth of the USA High School Clay Target League
Year	# of Teams	# of Yearly Participants
2001–2008	3	30
2009	6	60
2010	13	340
2011	29	707
2012	57	1,715
2013	115	4,200
2014	185	6,100
2015	268	10,600
2016	446	16,000
2017	615	22,000
2018	804	26,426
2019	1,042	32,810
2020	414	13,421
2021	1,311	38,255
2022	1,503	44,900
2023	1,647	49,337

== Official recognition ==
On December 7, 2012, the Minnesota State High School League approved a sanctioned, presenting partner, trapshooting State Tournament. The first tournament was held at the Minneapolis Gun Club in Prior Lake on June 14, 2014. This meant that trap shooting had been recognized the same as all other high school sports, and Minnesota became the first and only state high school athletic association to host a trapshooting tournament. The League operates and abides by similar rules as the Minnesota State High School League.

== Media attention ==
Little media attention was given to the league's efforts until the Minneapolis StarTribune wrote a piece about the efforts to get shooting sports into Minnesota schools.

In 2015 Bloomberg wrote about the league's expansion, noting that nearly 10,000 high school students were now taking part.

In 2019, the USA Clay Target League was featured in Time Magazine

The League's Illinois program was covered in the Chicago Tribune in 2021

== See also ==
- High school gun clubs and teams in the United States
