= Bryan Lions =

College athletics team

- University: Bryan College
- Association: NAIA
- Conference: AAC (primary)
- Athletic director: Dr. Jeremy Deal
- Location: Dayton, Tennessee
- Varsity teams: 15 (5 men's, 6 women's, 4 co-ed)
- Basketball arena: Summers Gymnasium
- Baseball stadium: Senter Field
- Mascot: Leo
- Nickname: Lions
- Colors: Red, Black, Grey, and White
- Website: bryanlions.com/index.aspx
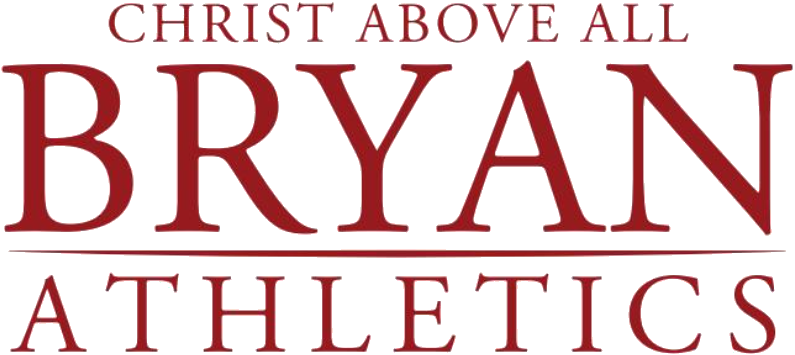

The Bryan Lions are the 16 intercollegiate athletic teams that represent Bryan College, located in Dayton, Tennessee. They are members of the National Association of Intercollegiate Athletics (NAIA) and primarily compete in the Appalachian Athletic Conference (AAC).

== Varsity teams ==
Bryan competes in 12 intercollegiate varsity sports fielding a total of 16 teams:

Men's sports	Women's sports
Baseball	Basketball
Basketball	Golf
Golf	Soccer
Soccer	Softball
Track and field	Track and field
	Volleyball
Co-ed sports
Cheerleading
Shooting
Fishing
Martial arts
Pickleball

=== Baseball ===
Baseball was added to the athletic program in 2002. In 2012, the team represented the college at the AAC tournament in the championship game. In the 2012 season, they set the record for the most wins in school history. After winning the AAC regular season, the Lions represented Bryan College at the 2019 NAIA national tournament.

=== Men's basketball ===
In 2013, Bryan College played in the AAC basketball tournament championship game, losing to the Tennessee Wesleyan Bulldogs. In 2016, a Bryan College player set the all-time points and rebounding records for his team, while also leading the NAIA (D-II) scoring above the total average points.

=== Women's basketball ===
The women's basketball program competed in the NAIA (D-II) national tournament after winning the AAC tournament in 2017, 2018, and 2019. In 2019, the team finished with a 31–2 record, including winning in the AAC regular season and tournament championship.

=== Fishing ===
Bryan College established its inaugural bass fishing team in fall of 2014. In 2017, the team participated in the Carhartt Bassmaster College Series. The Lions won the National Championship and the 2017 Cabela's School of the Year Award. In 2019, two students won the Bassmaster College Classic.

=== Men's and women's golf ===
Golf, both men's and women's, was added to the athletic program in 2010.

=== Martial Arts ===
In 2017, Bryan College announced the introduction of a Martial Arts Academy that competes across the southeastern region. Students train in Isshinryu karate. The Martial Arts Academy is a co-educational program open to male and female undergraduate students alike.

=== Shooting ===
Bryan College announced an inaugural shooting team beginning in the Fall of 2020. The shooting team compete in the Scholastic Clay Target Program and the National Intercollegiate Clay Target Championships respectively. Six events are included in the competitions including American Trap, International Trap, American Skeet, International Skeet, Sporting Clays, and Five Stand. The shooting team is a co-educational team and competes in Division III of the Scholastic Clay Target Program.

=== Men's soccer ===
In the late 1970s, the men's soccer team participated in the NCCAA (National Christian College Athletic Association). While in the association, the soccer team won three NCCAA Championships in 1977, 1978, and 1979. In recent years, the men's soccer team has competed in the AAC district tournaments and NAIA national tournaments, and subsequently in 2018 and 2019, the team made it to the championship round of the conference tournament, however, they lost both years to Reinhardt University and Union College respectively.

=== Women's soccer ===
In 2017, the Lady Lions won the regular season championship and represented the college in the NAIA national tournament. In the 2017 season, they recorded the most wins in the history of the program.

=== Softball ===
In 2010, Bryan College restarted the softball program, with games beginning in the spring of 2011. The Lions finished the 2019 season with a leading record of 20–28.

=== Volleyball ===
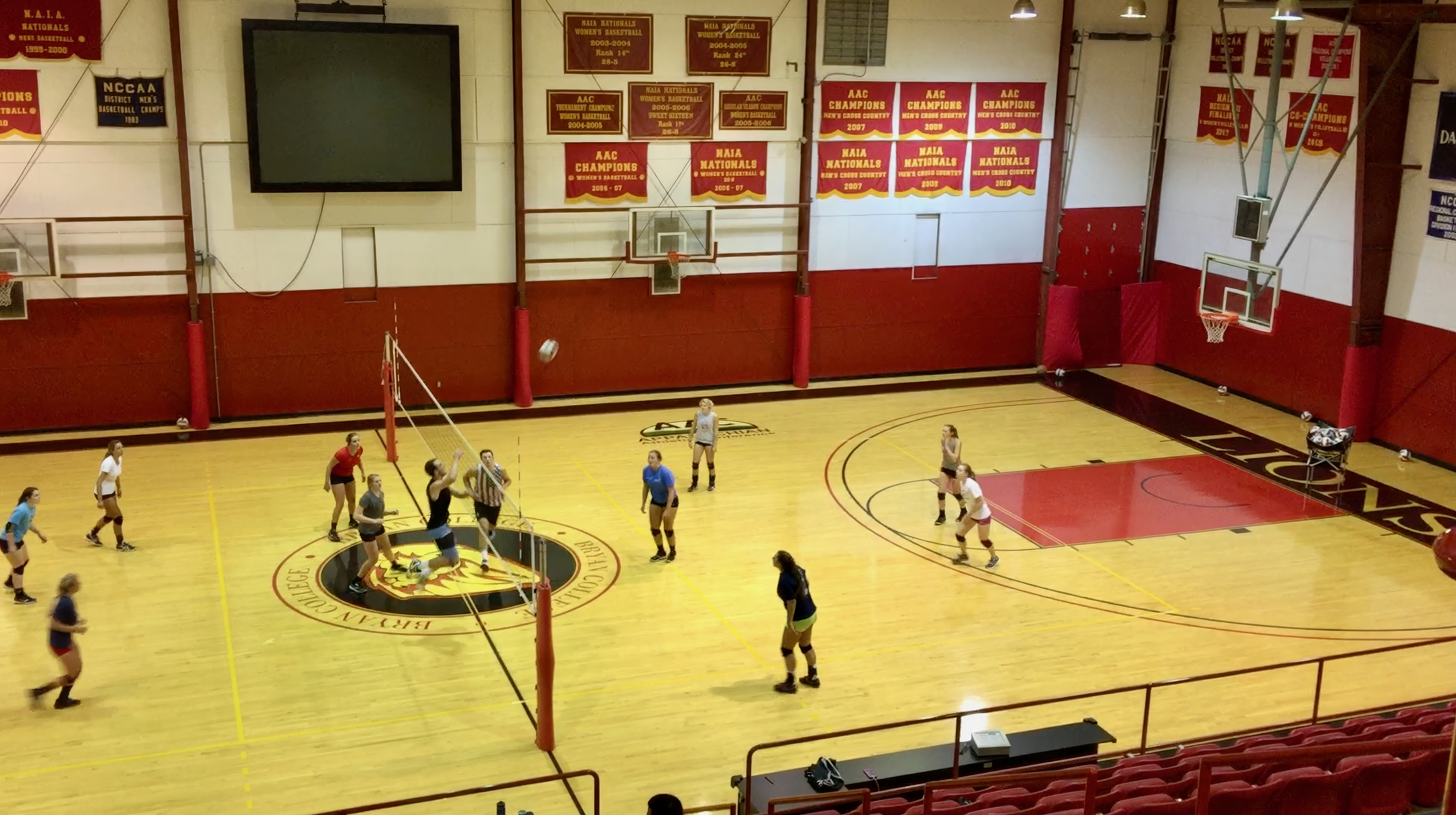
A volleyball game in Summers Gymnasium at Bryan College

In 2013, the program hosted its first NAIA national tournament match after winning the AAC. The Lady Lions recorded four straight AAC regular season championships including a 2014 season that was undefeated in conference play. In 2019, the Lions represented the college in the AAC conference tournament before falling to Union College.

== Rivalries ==
All rival athletic programs that compete against the Lions are in the Appalachian Athletic Conference.

- Tennessee Wesleyan
- Reinhardt
- Union
