= Five stand =

Five Stand is a type of shotgun sport shooting similar to sporting clays, trap and skeet. There are five stations, or stands and six to eighteen strategically placed clay target throwers (called traps). Shooters shoot in turn at various combinations of clay birds. Each station will have a menu card that lets the shooter know the sequence of clay birds (i.e. which trap the clay bird will be coming from). The shooter is presented with 5 targets at each station, first a single bird followed by two pairs. Pairs can be either "report pairs," in which the second bird will be launched after the shooter fires at the first; or "true pairs" when both birds launch at the same time. After shooting at the 5 birds on the menu at that station, the shooter proceeds to the next stand, where they find a new menu of 5 targets.

Typical five stand targets are a rabbit, chandelle, overhead, standard skeet high house and low house shots, teal (launched straight up into the air), trap (straight ahead from ground level), and an incoming bird.
