= High school gun clubs and teams in the United States =

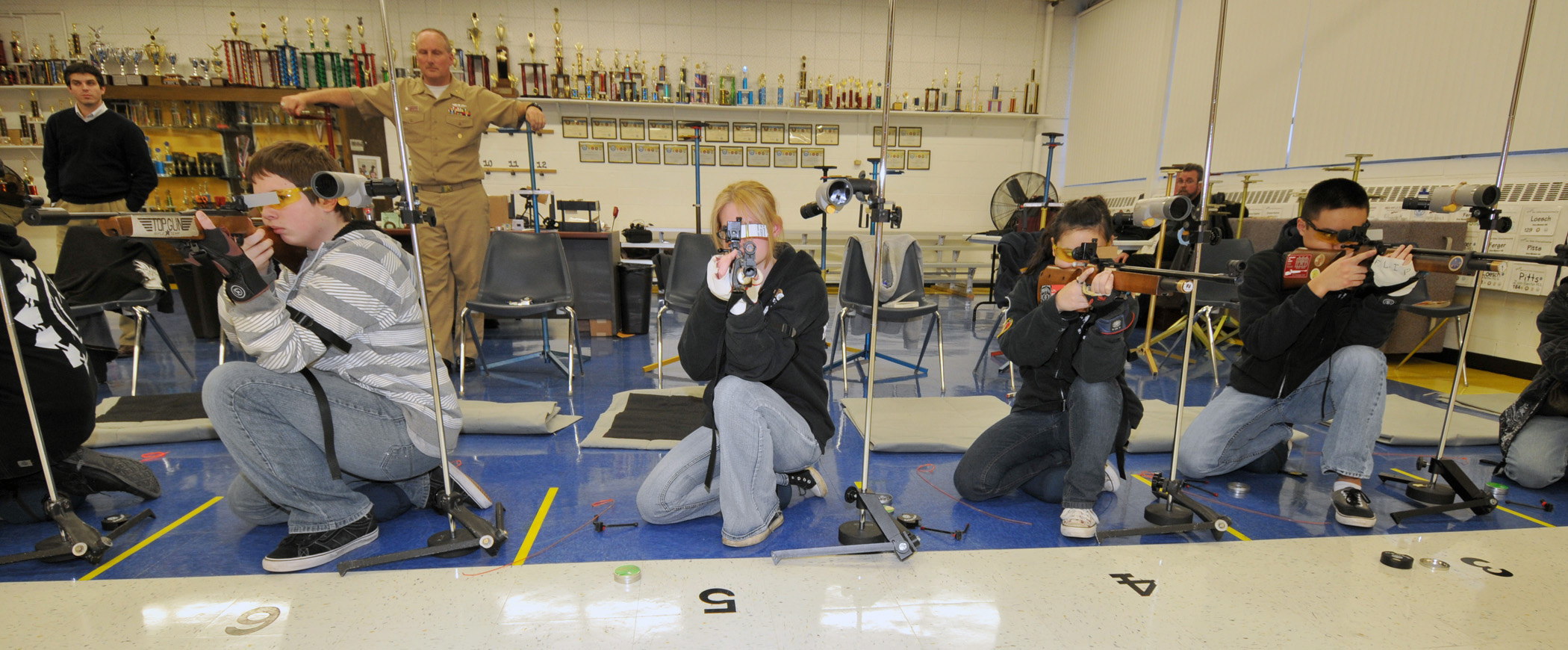
Navy Junior ROTC cadets from Zion-Benton Township High School in Illinois practice shooting at the school's air rifle range.

As of 2018, there are reportedly more than 2,000 high-school rifle programs across the United States. In 2015, 9,245 students in 317 schools across three states participated in the USA High School Clay Target League. In 2018, participation had increased 138% with 21,917 students from 804 teams in 20 states.

== History ==
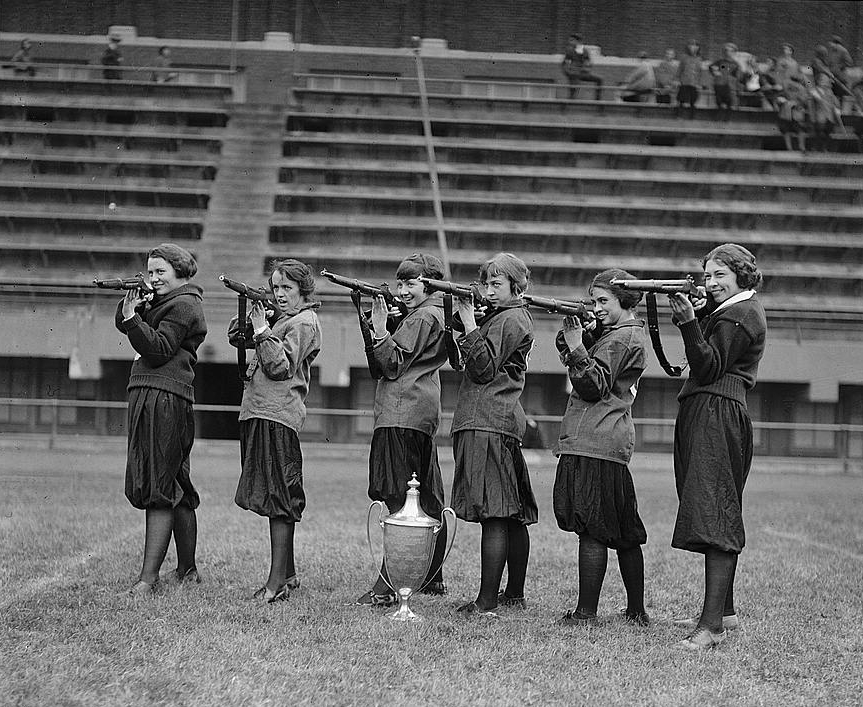
The girls rifle team at Central High (now Cardozo Education Campus) in Washington, D.C. (1922)

Supported by organizations like the Civilian Marksmanship Program, school-based gun education was routine for much of the 20th century. It was common for high school teams to compete with .22 caliber rifles. In recent years, air rifles have gained in popularity as a more affordable and safer alternative to .22 rifles.

According to John Lott:

Until 1969 virtually every public high school—even in New York City—had a shooting club. High school students in New York City carried their guns to school on the subways in the morning, turned them over to their homeroom teacher or the gym coach during the day, and retrieved them after school for target practice. Club members were given their rifles and ammunition by the federal government. Students regularly competed in citywide shooting contests for university scholarships.

In 2008, the Minnesota State High School Clay Target League was formed out of an after-school mentorship program run by Jim Sable, a retired advertising executive and avid trap shooter. By 2010 the program had renamed itself the USA Clay Target League. Today, the USA Clay Target League is the largest youth clay target shooting program with over 38,000 students participating in 2021.

== See also ==
- Junior Reserve Officers' Training Corps (JROTC)
- Victory Corps
