= Clay pigeon shooting =

Shooting sport

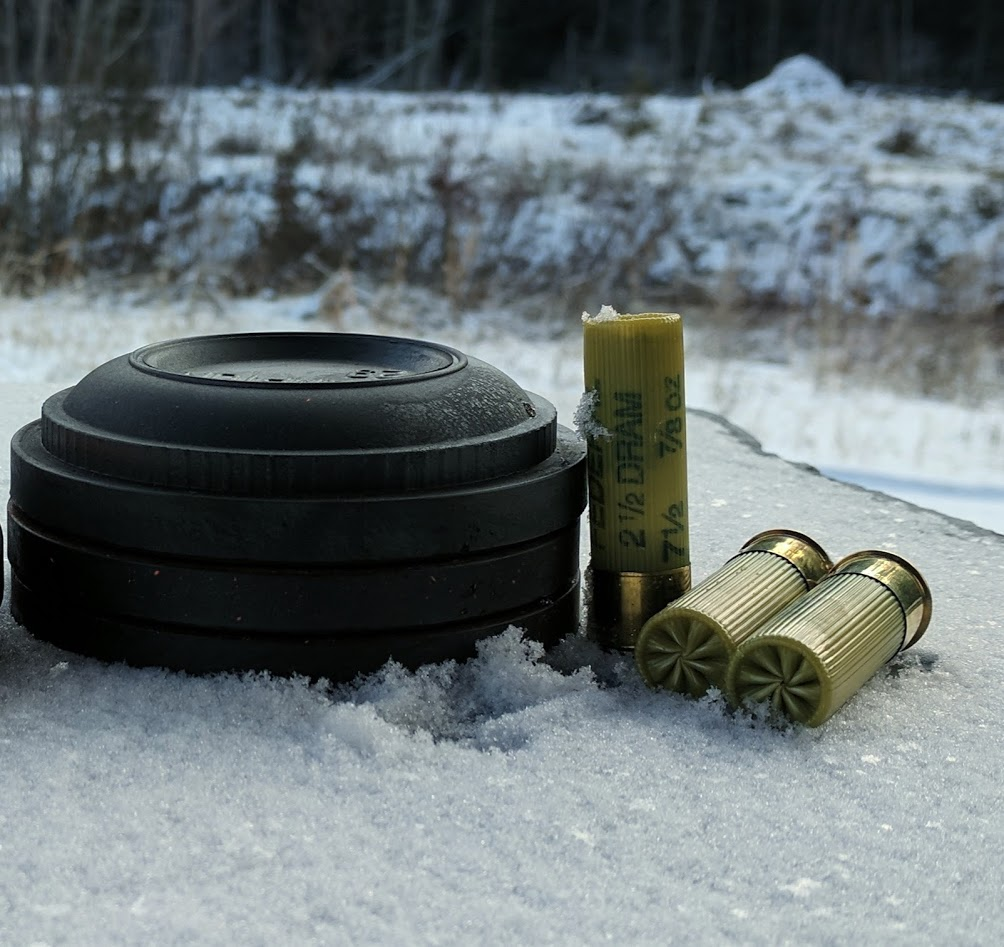
Small pile of clays next to some 20 gauge cartridges

Clay pigeon shooting, also known as clay target shooting, is a shooting sport involving shooting at special flying targets known as "clay pigeons" or "clay targets" with a shotgun. Despite their name, the targets are usually inverted saucers made of pulverized limestone mixed with pitch and a brightly colored pigment.

== History ==
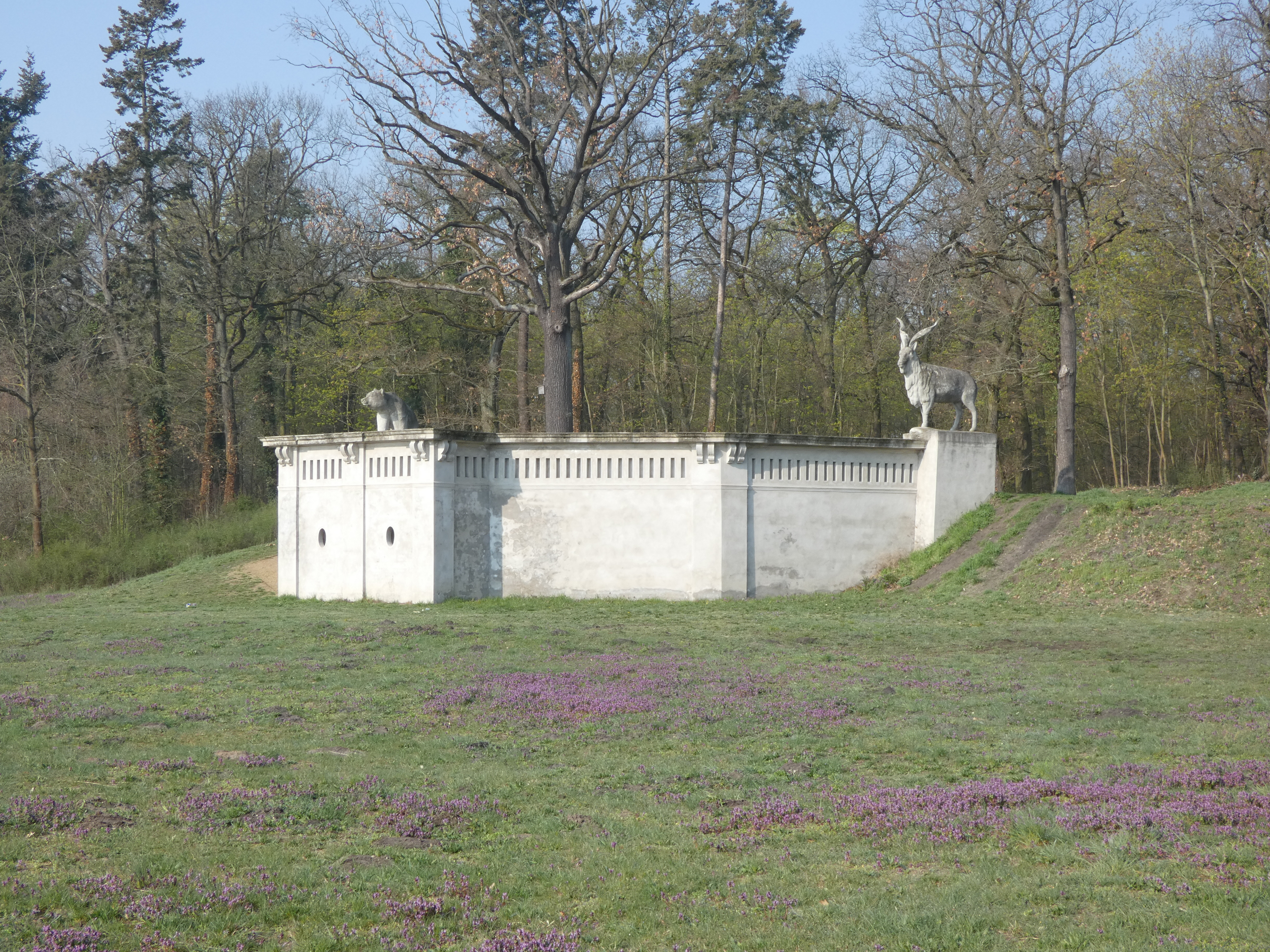
A decorative clay pigeon shooting stand at Plaue Castle (Germany) around 1900

Clay targets began to be used in place of live pigeons around 1875. Asphalt targets were later developed, but the name "clay targets" stuck. In 1893, the Inanimate Bird Shooting Association was formed in England. It was renamed to the Clay Bird Shooting Association in 1903. It held annual clay-pigeon-shooting contests and lasted until the outbreak of World War I. In 1921, the British parliament passed a bill without opposition making it illegal to shoot birds from traps. A decorative clay pigeon shooting stand at Plaue Castle in Germany, built around 1900 and decorated with animal figures, is one of the oldest of its kind.

Clay shooters may still use terminology that originated from the use of live pigeons. A target may be called a "bird", a hit may be referred to as a "kill", and a missed target as a "bird away"; the machine which projects the targets is still known as a "trap".

== Disciplines ==
Clay pigeon shooting has at least 20 different forms of regulated competition called disciplines, although most can be grouped under the main headings of trap, skeet, and sporting.

- In the trap shooting, the targets are launched from a single "house" or machine, generally away from the shooter.
- In skeet shooting, targets are launched from two houses in somewhat sideways paths that intersect in front of the shooter.
- Sporting clays includes a more complex course, with many launch points.

=== Sporting clays ===
The English Sporting discipline has the sport's biggest following. While the other disciplines only use standard targets, in Sporting almost anything goes. Targets are thrown in a great variety of trajectories, angles, speeds, elevations and distances and the discipline was originally devised to simulate live quarry shooting, hence some of the names commonly used on sporting stands: springing teal, driven pheasant, bolting rabbit, crossing pigeon, dropping duck, etc. Disciplines in this group include English sporting, international (FITASC) sporting, super sporting sportrap, and Compak sporting.

This discipline can have an infinite variety of "stands". English sporting is the most popular form of clay shooting in the UK, and a course or competition will feature a given number of stands each of which has a predetermined number of targets, all traveling along the same path and speed, either as singles or doubles.

Each stand will feature a different type of target; e.g., crosser, driven, quartering, etc. International (FITASC) sporting gives a much greater variety of targets in terms of trajectory and speed, and is shot by squads of six competitors in rounds of 25 targets at a time. Super Sporting is a hybrid of the two preceding varieties. There are also other formats such as Compak sporting and sportrap in which five cages are surrounded by a number of traps, and shooters fire a specific combinations or singles from each stand according to a program displayed in front of the cage.

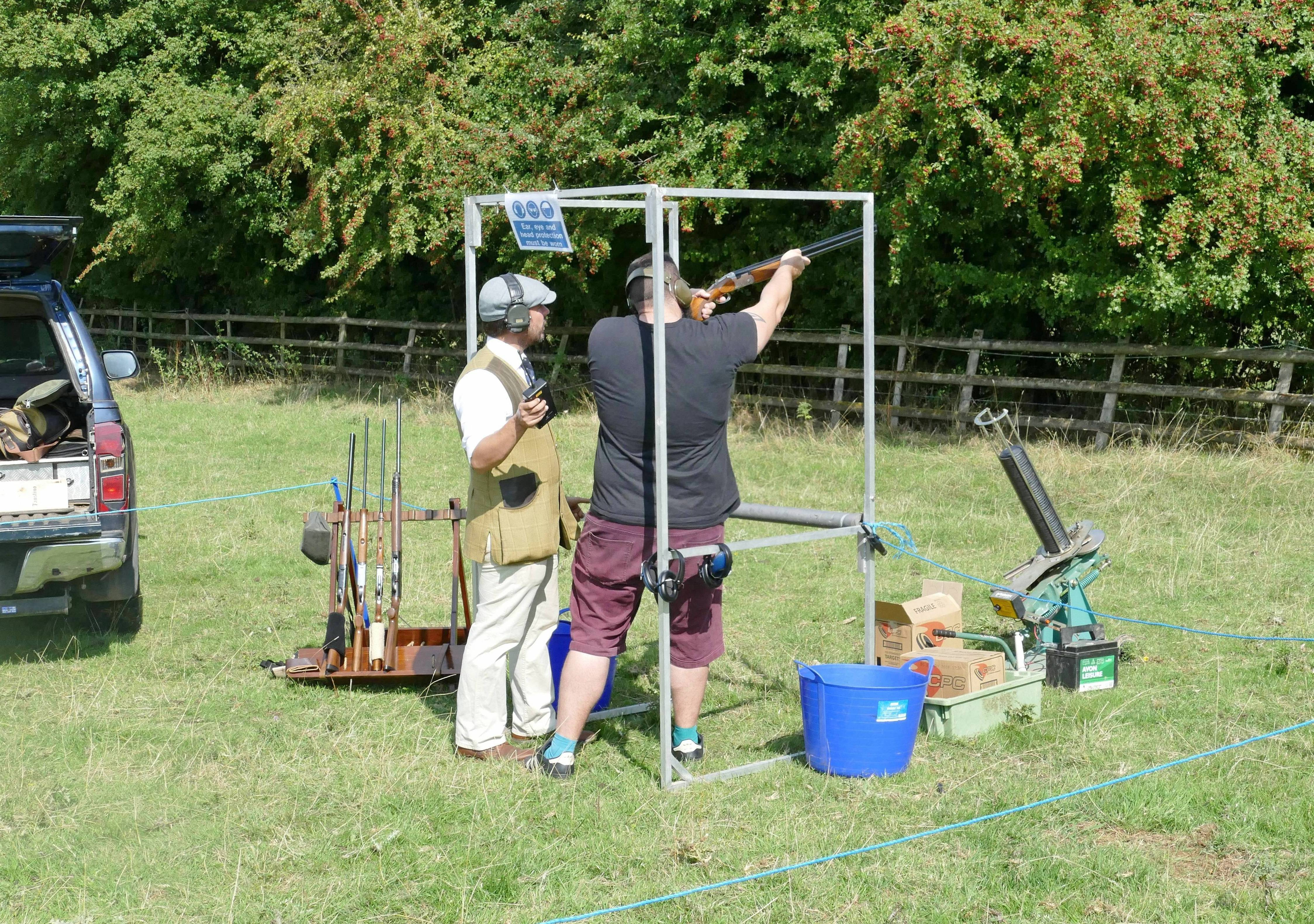
Clay pigeon shooting at a country fair, England

==== Maze clays shooting ====
This is a new shotgun game that offers sporting clays and FITASC target presentations on a skeet/trap or open field. This is possible by using a movable support system that carries the release buttons (wired or wireless setup) from 6 to 9 traps and the dual safety screen in any place on the field. As a result, the shooter can shoot in safe conditions upon target presentations in varying range (10 to 60 yards) and varying angles (sharp to wide).

=== Trap shooting ===
Targets are thrown either as singles or doubles from one or more traps situated some 15 m in front of the shooter, and are generally going away from the firing point at varying speeds, angles and elevations. The most common disciplines in this group are:

- Down-The-Line (DTL) Single Barrel
- Double Rise
- Automatic Ball Trap (ABT)
- Olympic Trap
- Double Trap
- Helice (or ZZ)

==== Down-the-Line ====
Also known as DTL, this is a popular trap shooting discipline. Targets are thrown to a distance of 45 to 50 metres at a fixed height of approximately 2.75 m and with a horizontal spread of up to 22 degrees either side of the centre line. Each competitor shoots at a single target in turn, but without moving from the stand until all have shot at five targets. Then they all move one place to the right, and continue to do so until they have all completed a standard round of 25 birds. Scoring of each target is 3 points for a first barrel kill, 2 points for a second barrel kill and 0 for a miss, for a possible maximum 75 points per round. Variations of this discipline are single-barrel, double-rise, and handicap-by-distance.

==== Olympic trap ====
As its name indicates, this is one of the disciplines which form part of the shooting programme at the Olympic Games. A trench in front of the shooting stands conceals 15 traps arranged in five groups of three. Shooters take turns to shoot at a target each, before moving in a clockwise direction to the next stand in the line. Targets for each shooter are thrown immediately upon the shooter's call and are selected by a shooting scheme (program) that ensures all competitors receive exactly the same target selection, but in an unpredictable randomised order to the extent that there will be one straight, two left and two right targets for each stand from any one of the three traps directly in front of the shooter; guessing which one is next is impossible unless the shooter is on his/her last five targets.

Olympic trap targets are set to travel 76 metres (249 ft) (+/-1m) at the top of trench level marker peg, unless the terrain is dead flat, at varying elevations and with a maximum horizontal angle of 45 degrees either side of the centre line (being where the target exits the trench). Scoring is on the basis of one point per target killed, regardless of whether this is achieved with the first or with the second barrel unless it is a final where the top six scorers shoot off as a single barrel event, regardless of local club grades if any.

A simpler and cheaper to install variation of this discipline is known as automatic ball trap (ABT) where only one trap is used and target variation is obtained by the continuous oscillation of the trap in both horizontal and vertical directions in order to give the same spread of targets as in Olympic trap. Similarly, the targets are also thrown to a maximum of 76 metres.

==== Universal trench ====
A variation on the theme of trap shooting, sometimes known as five trap. Five traps are installed in a trench in front of the shooting stands, all set at different angles, elevations and speeds, and upon the call of "Pull!" by the shooter any one of the five machines, selected at random, will be released.

Horizontal angles can vary from 0 degrees to 45 degrees either side of the centre line and target distance is between 60 and 70 metres (200 and 230 ft). Elevations can vary, as in other trap disciplines (except DTL), between 1.5 and 3.5 metres (4.9 and 11.5 ft) above ground level.

There are 10 different schemes available.

=== Skeet shooting ===
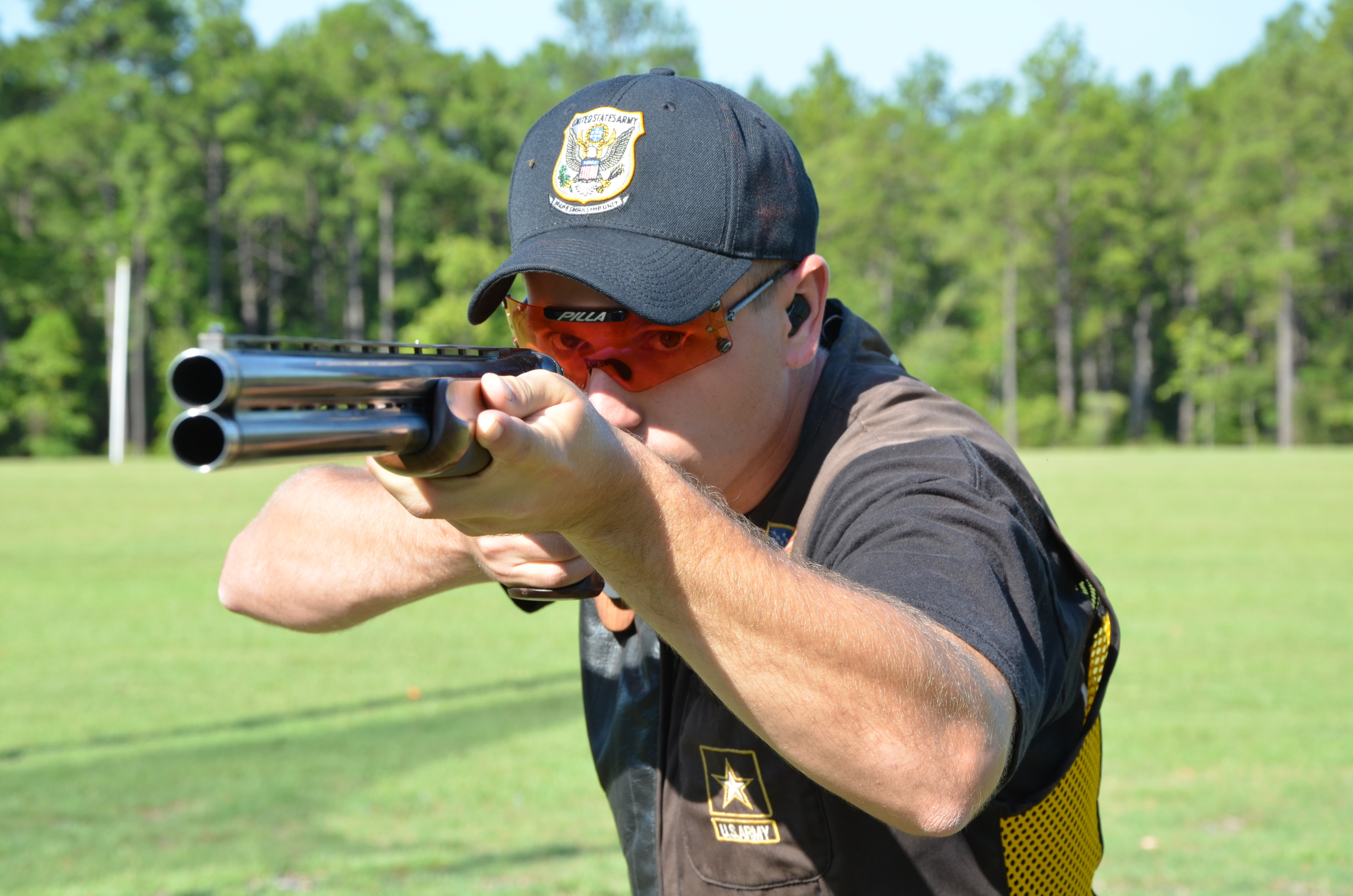
4-time Olympic gold medalist Vincent Hancock of the United States Army Marksmanship Unit taking part in a skeet shooting event

Skeet is a word of Scandinavian origin, though the discipline originated in America. Targets are thrown in singles and doubles from two trap houses situated some 40 metres (130 ft) apart, at opposite ends of a semicircular arc on which there are seven shooting positions. The targets are thrown at set trajectories and speeds. The main disciplines in this group are English skeet, Olympic skeet and American skeet, the latter of which is governed by the National Skeet Shooting Association (NSSA).

In NSSA discipline, targets are released in a combination of singles and doubles, adding up to a total of 25 targets per round, from the High and Low trap houses on a fixed trajectory and speed. Variety is achieved by shooting round the seven stations on the semicircle, followed by an eighth station, located between stations one and seven. Scoring is on the basis of one point per target killed, up to a maximum of 25.

In English skeet (by far the most popular of the skeet disciplines), the gun position is optional (i.e., pre-mounted or out-of-shoulder when the target is called) and the targets are released immediately upon the shooter's call.

In Olympic skeet, the targets travel at a considerably faster speed, the release of the target can be delayed up to three seconds after calling and the gun-down position is compulsory. There is also an eighth shooting station, midway between the two houses.

NSSA and English version of Skeet have the concept of option targets, where the shooter has to repeat the first missed target. In the situation where the first 24 targets are all hit, the last target is considered the option. Here is a representation of Skeet sequences for all variations.

==== Electrocibles or helice shooting ====
Originating in Belgium during the 1960s, Electrocibles is similar to trap shooting, but the clays are equipped with a helice that will give the clay an erratic and unpredictable flight. The helice is composed of two winged plastic propellers with a white clay in the centre. Now the sport is named helice shooting.

Plastic propellers holding a detachable centre piece are rotated at high speed and released randomly from one of five traps. They fly out in an unpredictable way; so-said buzzing through the air. It is designed specifically to simulate as closely as possible the old sport of live pigeon shooting. Its original name of ZZ comes from the inventor who made them out of zinc, and had previously shot a specific breed of pigeon called a zurito; hence the term the zinc zurito. World and European Championships are held every year organized by FITASC.

== Targets ==
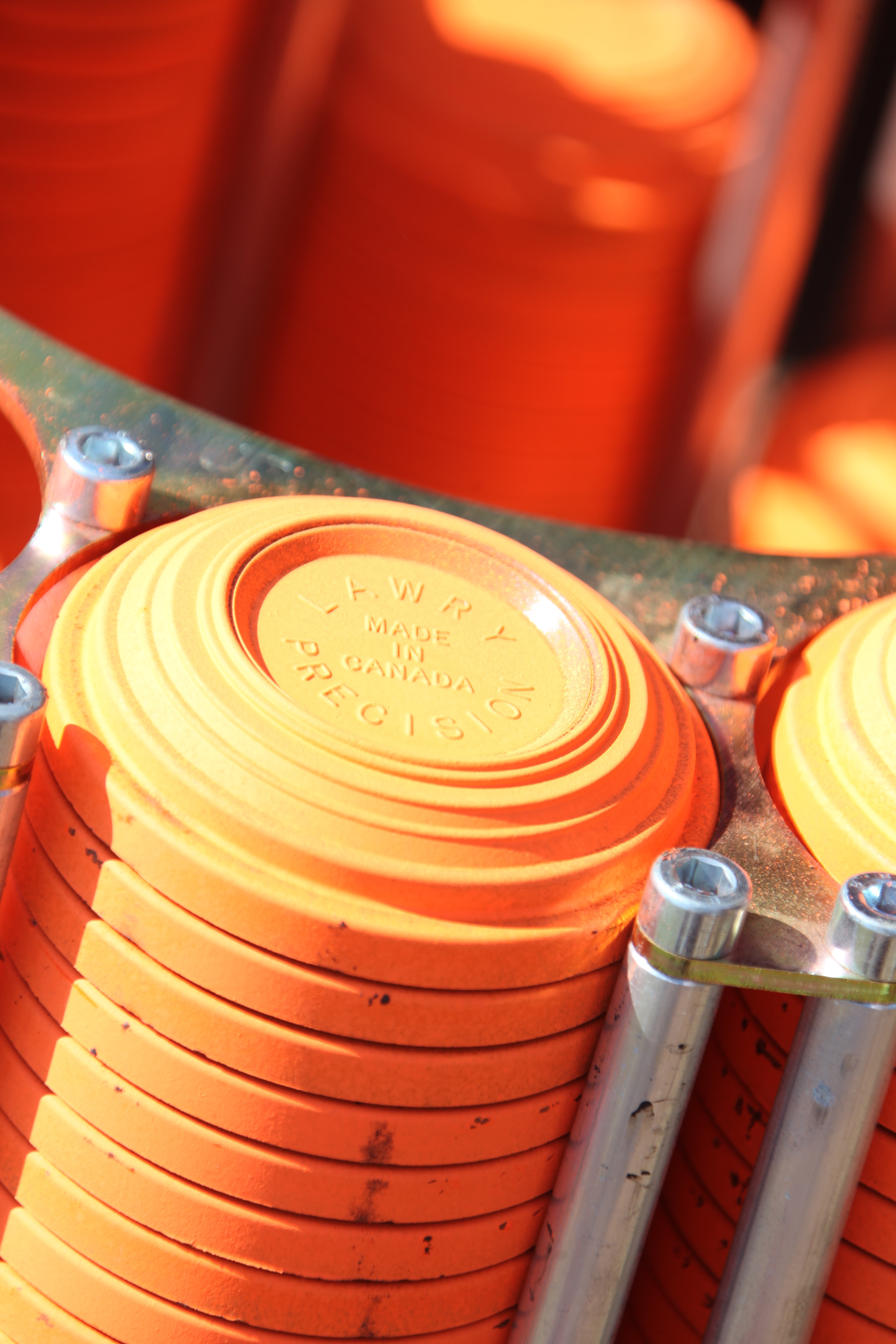
Stack of clays in a launcher

The targets used for the sport are usually in the shape of an inverted saucer, made from a mixture of pitch and pulverized limestone rock designed to withstand being thrown from traps at very high speeds, but at the same time being easily broken when hit by just a very few lead or steel pellets from a shotgun.

The targets are usually fluorescent orange or black, but other colours such as white, or yellow are frequently used in order that they can be clearly seen against varying backgrounds and/or light conditions.

Targets are made to very exacting specifications with regard to their weight and dimensions and must conform to set international standards.

There are several types of targets that are used for the various disciplines, with a standard 108 mm size being the most common used in American Trap, Skeet, and Sporting Clays while International disciplines of these same games use a slightly larger 110 mm diameter size. Only the standard 108/110 mm target is used in all of the trap and skeet disciplines. Sporting shoots feature the full range of targets (except ZZ) to provide the variety that is a hallmark of the discipline.

All three sports use a shotgun, and in the sporting disciplines are sub-classified by the type of game the clay target represents (pigeon, rabbit, etc.). The two primary methods of projecting clay targets are airborne and ground (rolling).

Naturally, the simplest method of throwing a clay target is by hand, either into the air or along the ground. This method is the simplest, and many "trick shot" shooters throw their own targets (some able to throw as many as ten birds up and hit each individually before any land). However, a multitude of devices have been developed to throw the birds more easily and with more consistency. A plastic sling-like device is the simplest, though modern shooting ranges will usually have machines that throw the clay targets in consistent arcs at the push of a button.

Standard
The most commonly used target of all, must weigh 105 g and be of 110 mm overall diameter and 25–26 mm in height for International competitions and for American competitions they must weigh approximately 100 g (3.5 oz) and be of 108 mm (4.3 in) overall diameter and 28.0–29.0 mm (1.10–1.14 in) in height.
Midi
Same saucer shape as the standard but with a diameter of only 90 mm; these targets are faster than the standard types.
Mini
This target is sometimes likened to a flying bumblebee at only 60 mm in diameter and 20 mm in height.
Battue
A very thin target measuring about 108–110 mm in diameter, it flies very fast and falls off very suddenly simulating a duck landing. They are generally more expensive than other targets.
Rabbit
A thicker, but standard 108–110 mm diameter flat target in the shape of a wheel designed to run along the ground.
ZZ
This is a plastic, standard sized target attached to the center of a two-blade propeller of different color designed to zigzag in flight in a totally unpredictable manner.

== Traps ==
Traps are purpose-made, spring-loaded, flywheel or rotational devices especially designed to launch the different types of targets in singles or pairs at distances of up to 100 metres.

These machines vary from the very simple hand-cocked, hand-loaded and hand-released types to the highly sophisticated fully automatic variety, which can hold up to 600 targets in their own magazine and are electrically or pneumatically operated. Target release is by remote control, either by pressing a button or by an acoustic system activated by the shooter's voice.

Target speeds and trajectories can be easily modified and varied to suit the discipline or type of shooting required.

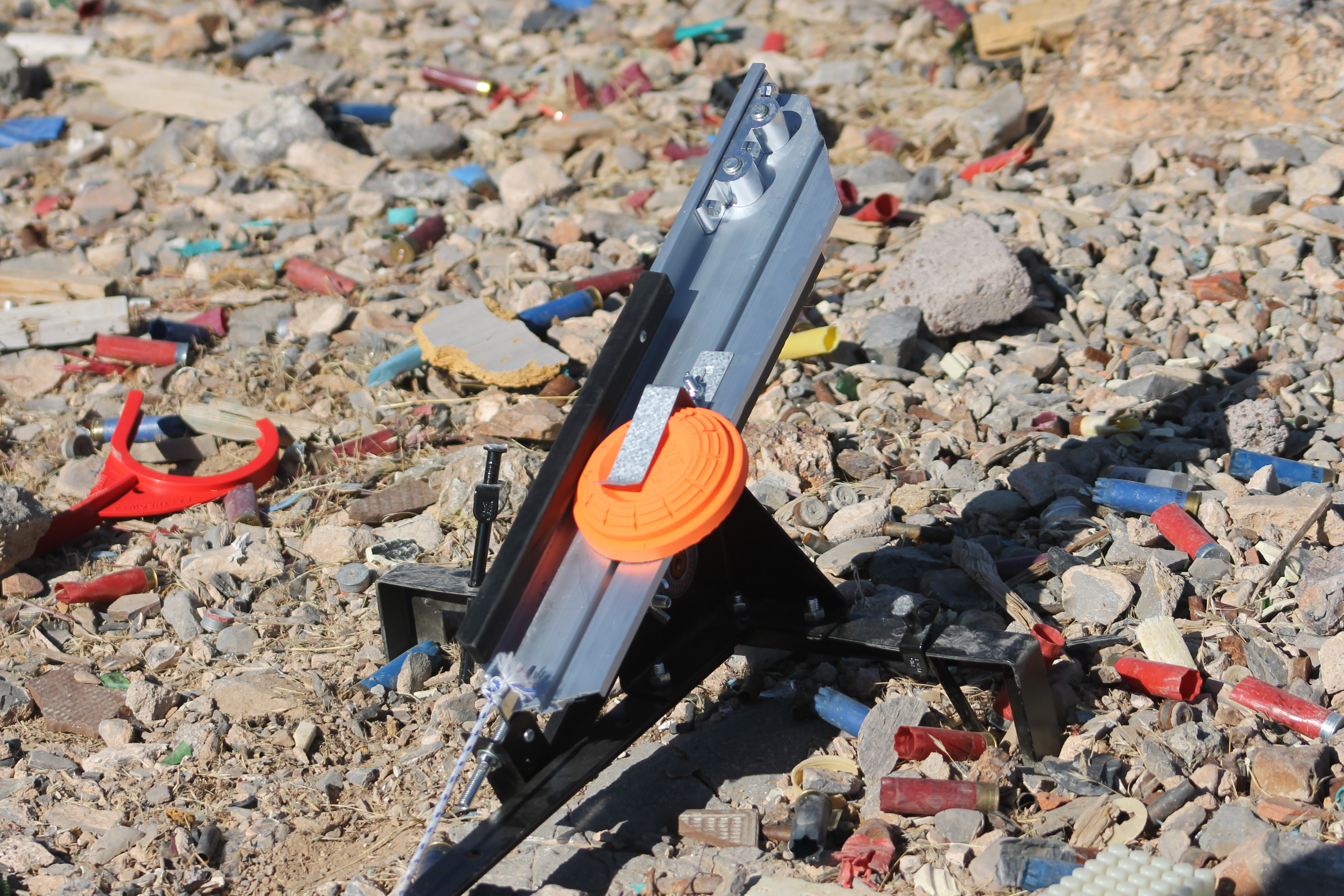
Simple swing arm clay launcher, or trap

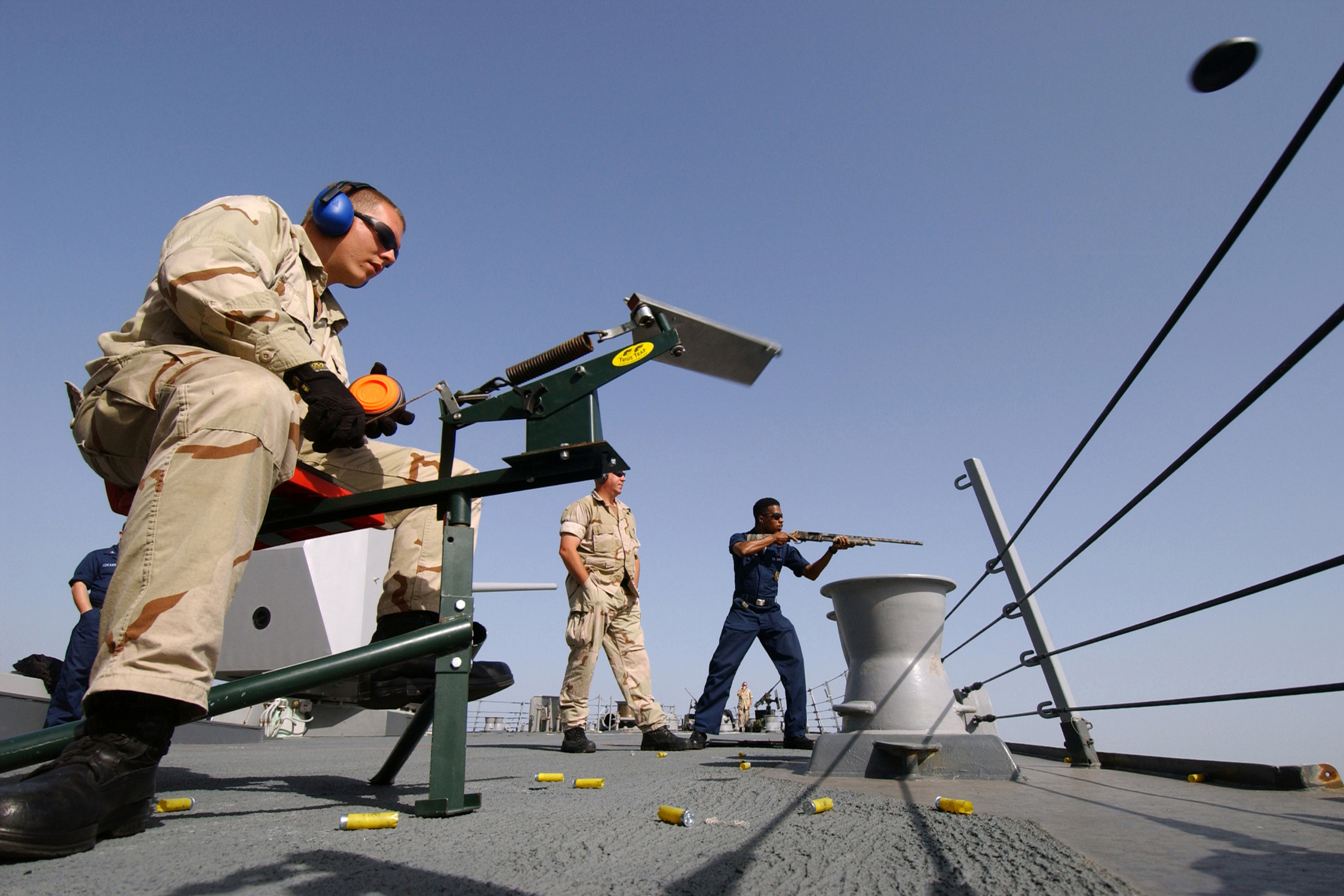
Swing arm trap launching a clay

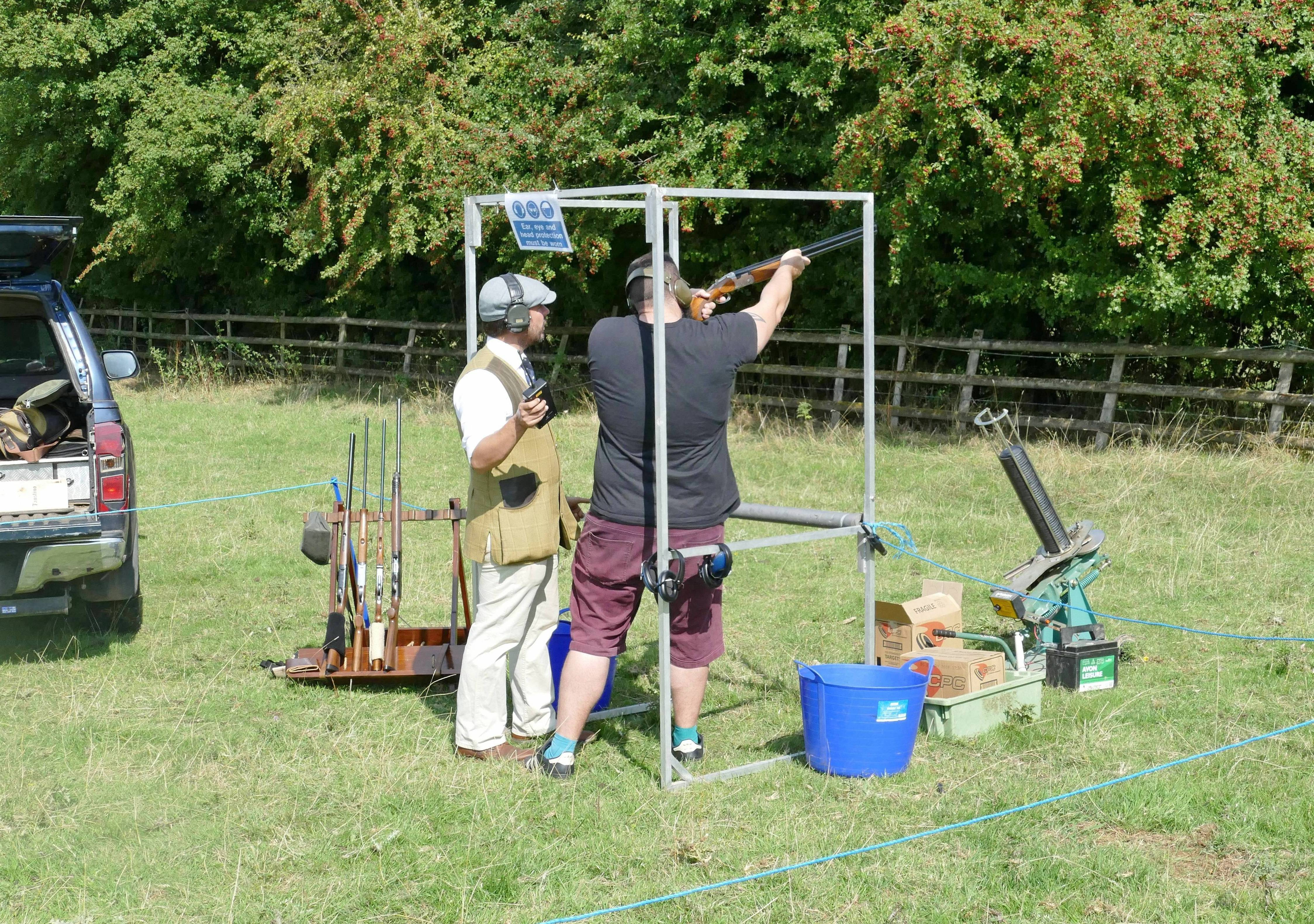
Small electrically powered trap operated by remote control

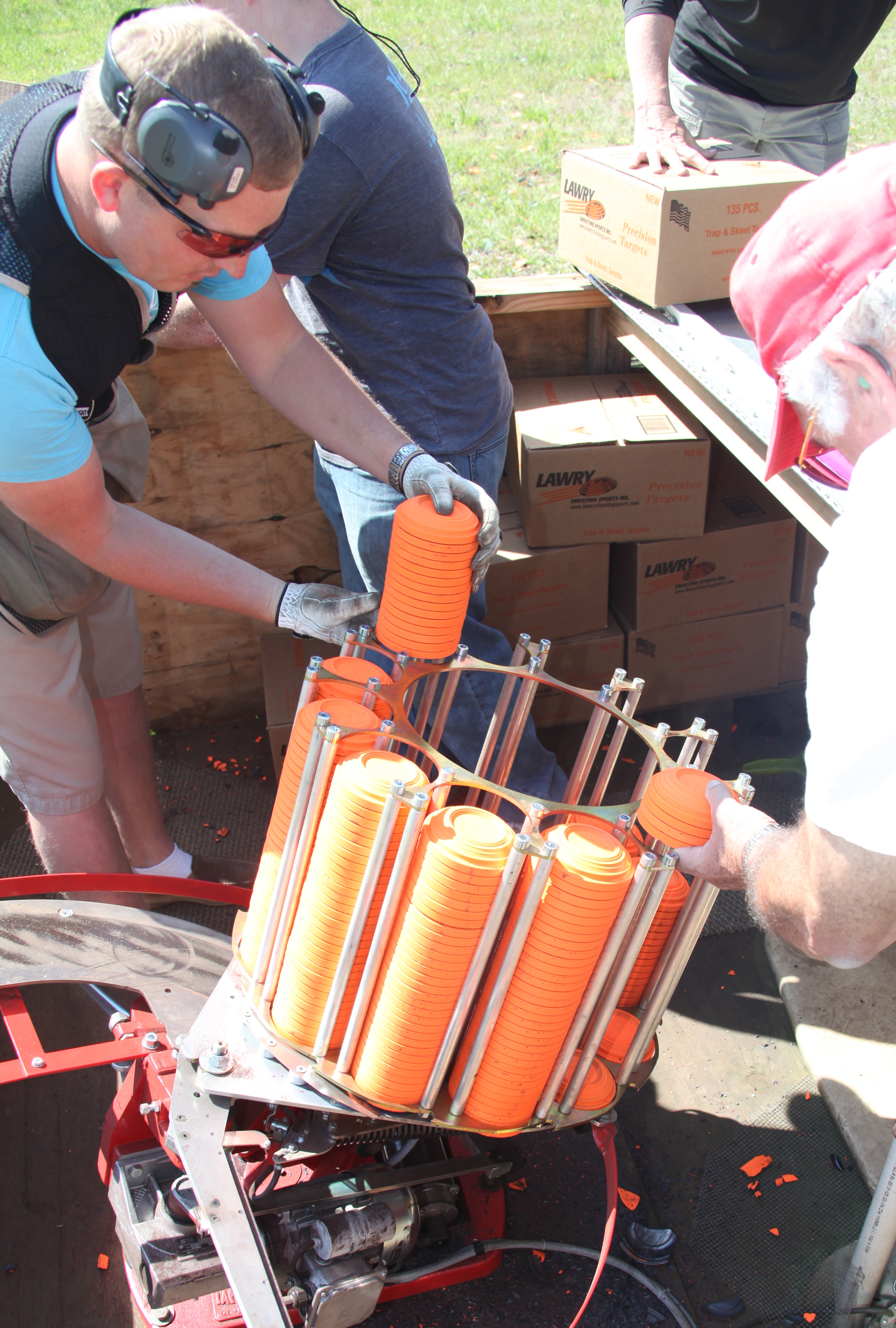
Clay pigeons being loaded into an automatic thrower

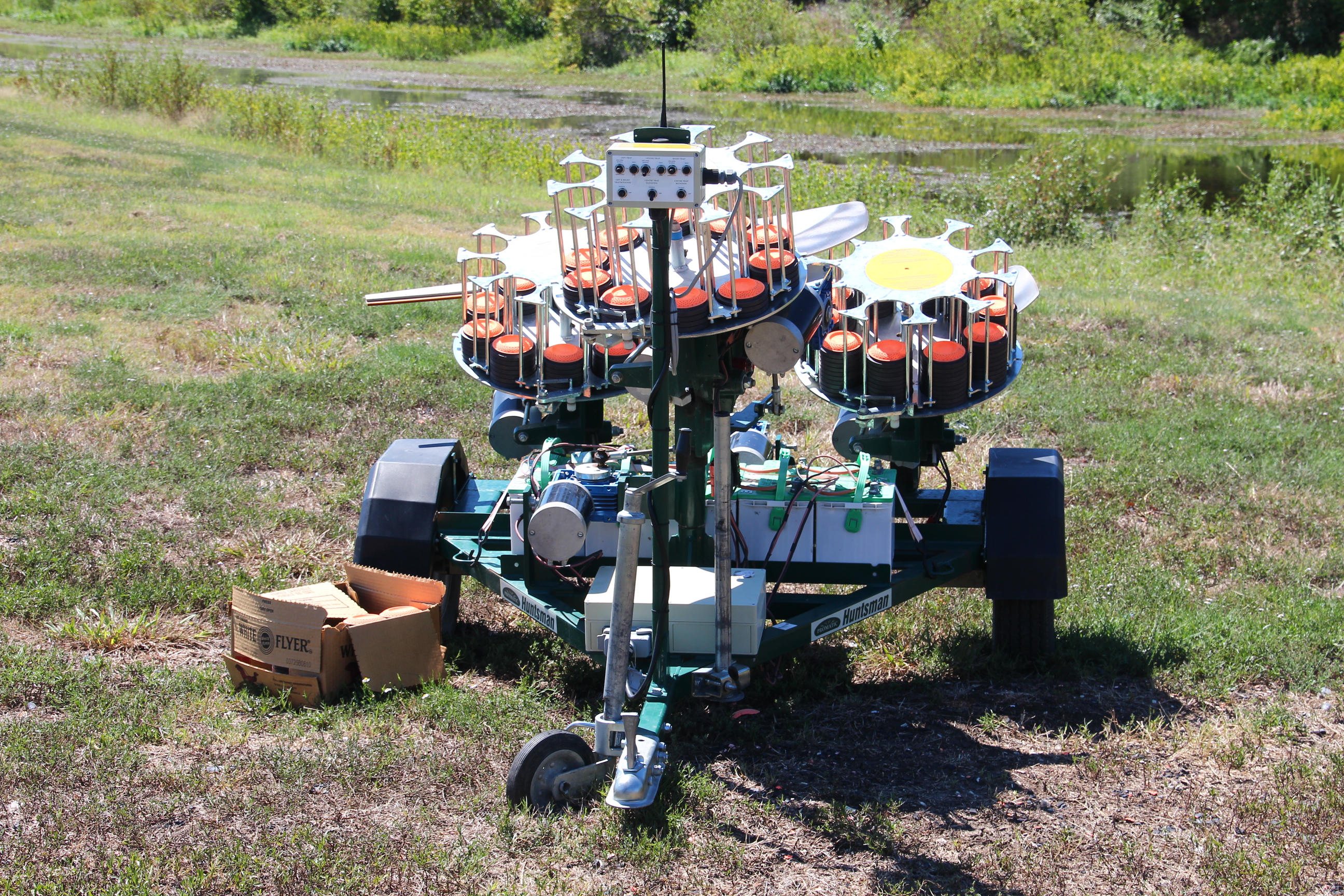
Automatic thrower

== Guns ==
Clay pigeon shooting is performed with a shotgun. The type of shotgun used is often a matter of taste and affected by local laws as well as the governing body of the sport in competitive cases.

All types of shotguns are suitable for clay pigeon shooting, however the ability to fire multiple shots in quick succession is generally considered important. Some skilled shooters use a single shot firearm in order to add to the challenge. Traditionally over-and-under and side-by-side shotguns have been popular, however semi-automatic, and to a lesser extent pump-action, have been making gains, particularly as reliable, accurate semi-automatics have come down in price.

Single-shot
Most single-shot shotguns are break action; they have one barrel and can hold only one shot until reloaded manually. Some are very inexpensive, and they are the most popular type of gun in American Trap. Most other clay pigeon shooting disciplines require guns capable of holding at least two shells. Due to the lighter weight of some single-shot guns the recoil "kick" is strong, further reducing their appeal for high volume clay shooting.

Over-and-under
(sometimes shortened to O/U) This gun has two barrels, one above the other. There is usually one trigger, but some models have two, one for each barrel. Within this type there are three sub-groups of specification: trap, skeet, and sporting. Trap guns are generally heavier and longer barreled (normally 30 or 32 in or 0.76 or 0.81 m) with tight choking and designed to shoot slightly above the point of aim. Skeet guns are usually lighter and faster handling with barrel length from 26 to 28 in (0.66 to 0.71 m) and with fairly open chokes. Sporting models most often come with an interchangeable choke facility and barrel lengths of 28 in (0.71 m), 30 in (0.76 m), and 32 in (0.81 m) according to preference.

Side-by-side
(sometimes shortened to SXS) This gun has two barrels side-by-side. They are harder to aim for new shooters, as the two barrels do not provide the same instinctive feedback as the single visible barrel of a semi-automatic or O/U. Modern production of SXS weapons is limited in favor of O/U, and older weapons are usually not rated for steel shot, preventing their use on many shooting ranges.

Pump-action
This is a single barreled gun that reloads from a tubular or box magazine when the user slides a grip toward and then away from themselves. The pump-action format is popular with casual shooters in the US, but far less common in Europe. The pump-action is inherently slower than other multi-shot guns, making follow-up shots more difficult. Although as mechanically complex as a semi-automatic, they lack recoil reduction.

Semi-automatic
The semi-automatic shotgun has a single barrel; it fires one shell when the trigger is pressed, then chambers a new shell from a magazine automatically until the magazine is empty. This design combines reduced recoil and relatively low weight with quick follow up shots.

== Cartridges ==
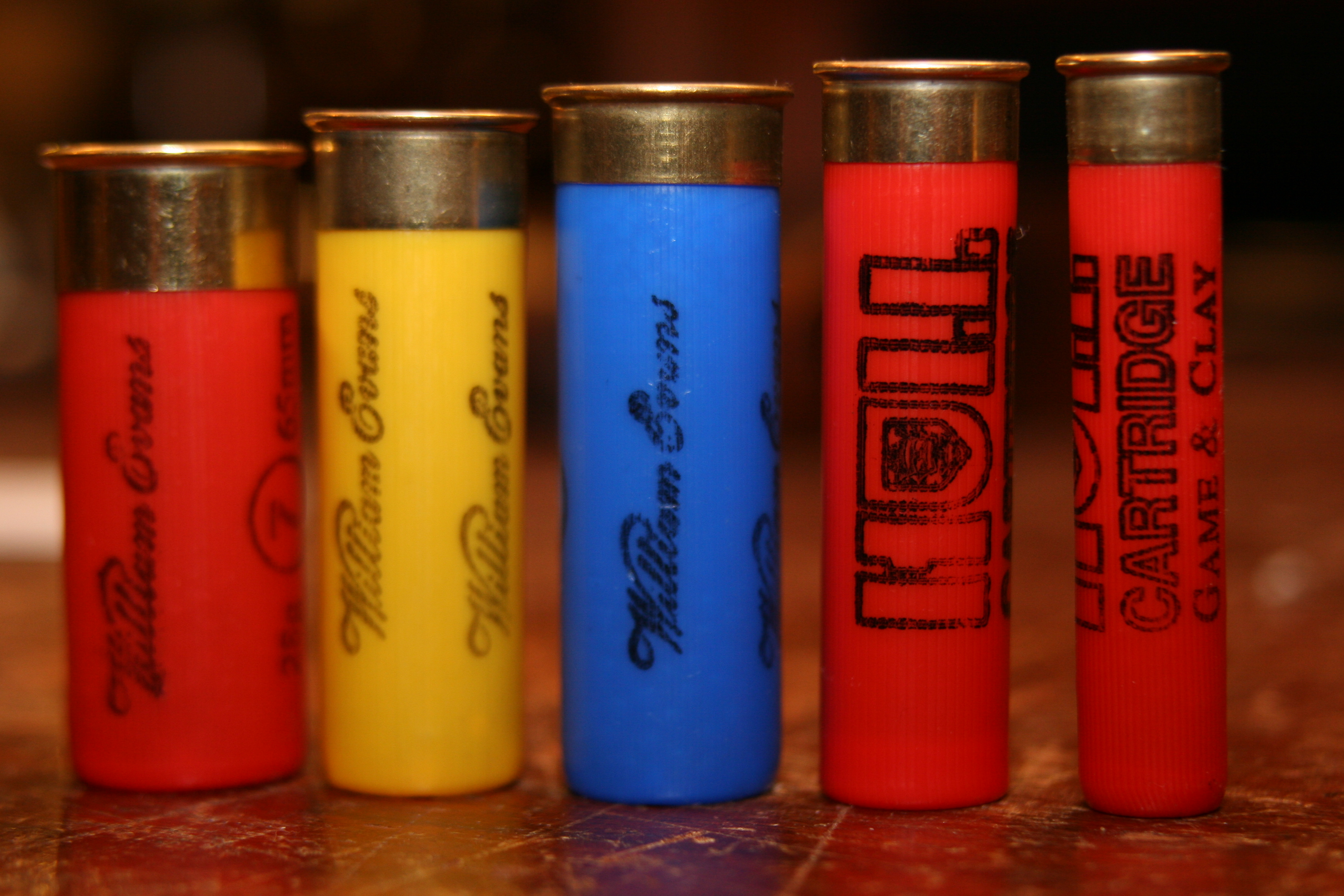
Shotgun shell comparison (left to right): 12-gauge, 20-gauge, 16-gauge, 28-gauge, and .410 bore

All shotgun cartridges may be used, including 10, 12, 16, 20, 28 gauge, and .410 bore. They are readily available in gun shops and at shooting grounds, and within limitations as to the shot size and the weight of the shot load are suitable for clay shooting at Clay Pigeon Shooting Association (CPSA) affiliated grounds in England, and for use in events coming under CPSA rules. Though home-loaded cartridges allow the user to customize the ballistic characteristics of their shells, they are not usually allowed at clay pigeon shooting events.

The instructions and specifications are printed on the boxes. For clay competition, shot size must not exceed 2.6 mm/English No. 6. The shot load must be a maximum 28 g (0.99 oz) for all domestic disciplines; or 24 g (0.85 oz) for Olympic trap, Olympic skeet, and double trap; up to 28 g for FITASC sporting (from 2005); and 36 g (1.3 oz) for helice.

== Laser clay shooting ==
Laser clay pigeon shooting, also known as laser clay shooting or just laser shooting, is a variation on the traditional clay pigeon shooting where the shotguns are fitted with laser equipment that can detect hits on specially modified reflective clays, instead of firing cartridges. Laser clay pigeon shooting offers a safe alternative for beginners, and the location is less constrained.

The rules and disciplines are normally the same as the traditional sport using live weapons.

The earliest type of laser clay shooting equipment were analogue and consisted of four principal pieces of equipment: guns, launcher, scoreboard and clays.

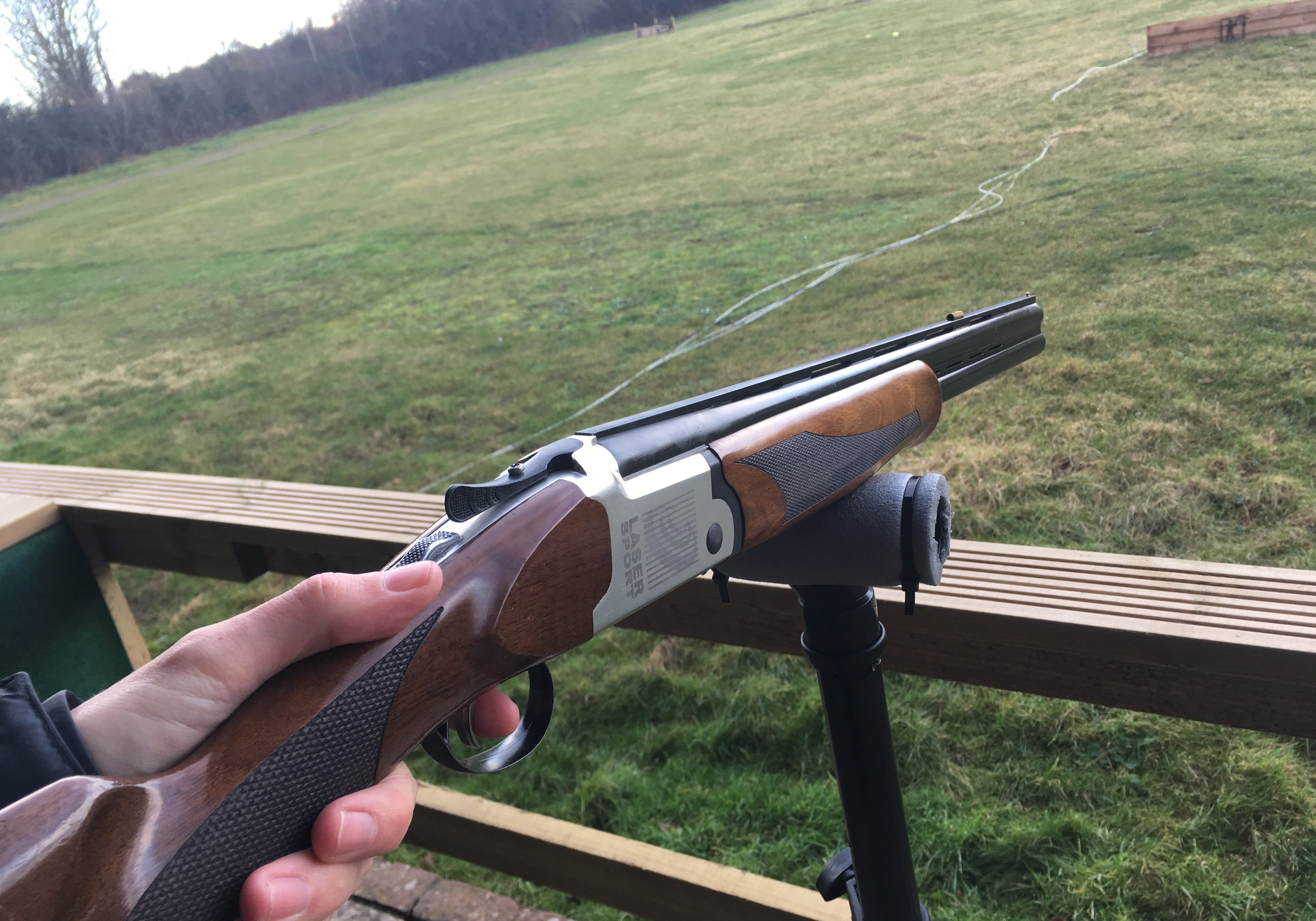
A laser clay shooting gun at a laser clay shooting range.

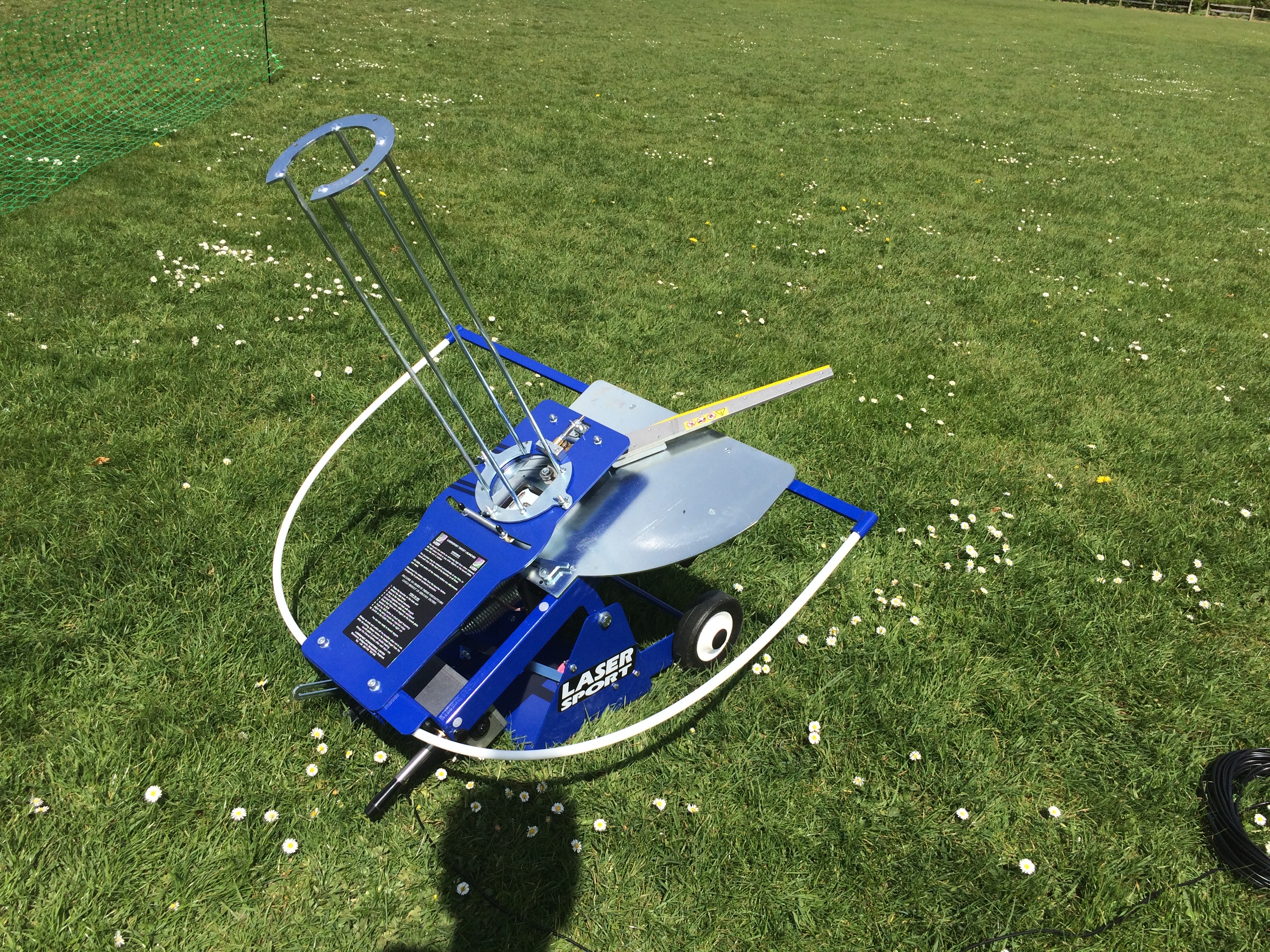
Laser Clay Launcher/Trap

In the 2020s, laser clays systems using digital technology were developed. This version of the game is microprocessor-driven and is managed from an app that remotely controls the clay launcher. Components for the digital laser clay game include: guns, target launcher, monitor, clays, an Android device that runs the game app, and several radio transmitters and receivers.

Laser shooting can also be practised indoors. As with traditional clay shooting, clays are released from a trap and the participants shoot at the flying disc. Unlike traditional clay shooting, multiple participants all shoot at the same disc. In most equipment the register of hits and misses is recorded electronically, and sounds of shotgun firing and the clay being hit are played electronically.

Although the activity is similar to traditional clay shooting it uses slightly different shooting principles, some of which are closer to target shooting.
