= Trap shooting =

One of the three major disciplines of competitive clay pigeon shooting

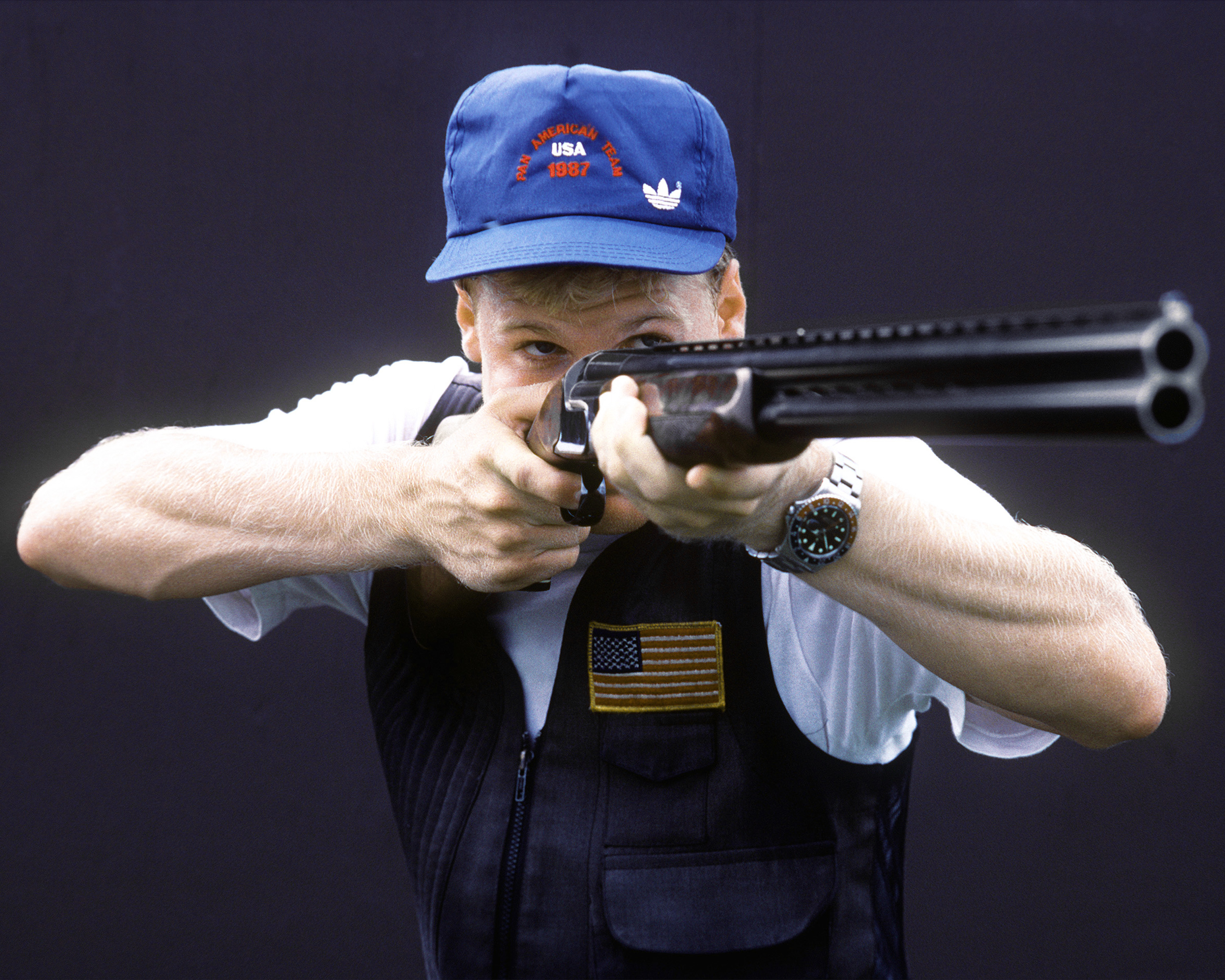

Men
- Number of targets: 125 + 50
- Olympic Games: Since 1900
- World Championships: Since 1929
- Abbreviation: TR125

Women
- Number of targets: 125 + 50
- Olympic Games: Since 2000
- World Championships: Since 1962
- Abbreviation: TR125W

Mixed Team
- Number of targets: 150 (75 each) + 50
- Olympic Games: Since 2020
- World Championships: Since 2017
- Abbreviation: TRMIX

Trap shooting is one of the three major disciplines of competitive clay pigeon shooting. The other disciplines are skeet shooting and sporting clays.

Trap shooting is distinguished by the targets being launched from a single "house" or machine, generally away from the shooter, compared with skeet shooting where targets are launched from two "houses" crossing in front of the shooter. Sporting clays involve a more complex course, with many launch points.

== Participation ==
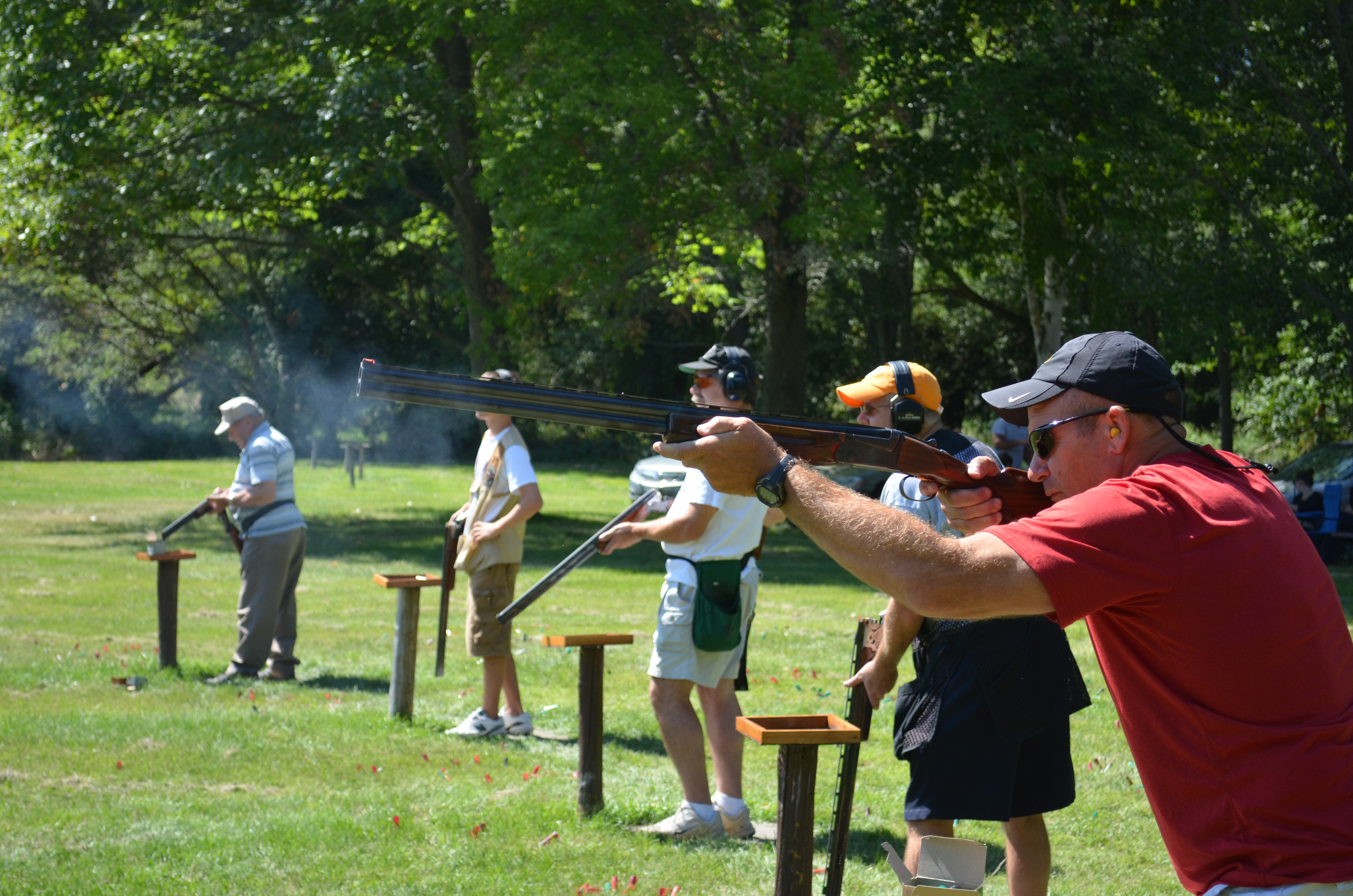
Typical trap shoot line at an amateur event

Trap shooting is practiced all over the world but is most popular in the United States (particularly the Midwest), Canada and Europe. Trap shooting variants include, but are not limited to, international varieties Olympic trap, also known as "International Trap", "Bunker", "ISSF Trap", "Trench". Non-Olympic shooting variants include Down-The-Line, also known as "DTL", Nordic Trap, and double trap. American Trap is the predominant version in the United States and Canada.

American Trap has two independent governing bodies. The Amateur Trapshooting Association (ATA) sanctions events throughout the United States and Canada, as well as the Pacific International Trapshooting Association (PITA) which sanctions events on the West Coast of North America.

== History ==
Trap shooting was originally developed, in part, to augment bird hunting and to provide a method of practice for bird hunters. Use of targets was introduced as a replacement for live pigeon-shooting. Indeed, one of the names for the targets used in shooting games is clay pigeons. The layout of a modern trap shooting field differs from that of a skeet field and/or a sporting clays course.

Trap shooting has been a sport since the late 18th century when real birds were used; usually the now-extinct passenger pigeon, which was extremely abundant at the time. Birds were placed under hats or in traps which were then released. Artificial birds were introduced around the time of the American Civil War. Glass balls (Bogardus) and subsequently "clay" targets were introduced in the later 1800s, gaining wide acceptance.

== Equipment ==
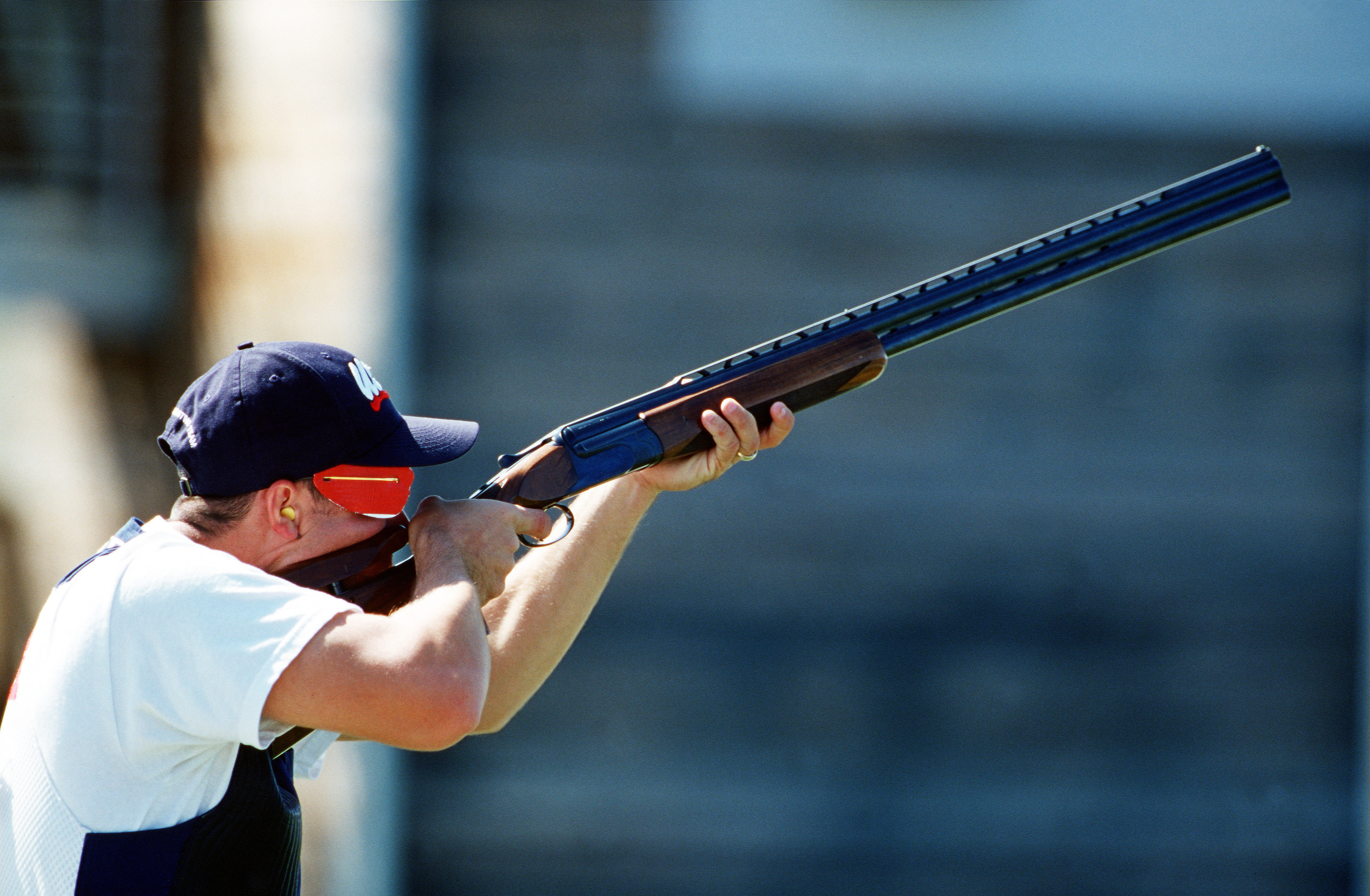
A competitor at the 2000 Summer Olympics trap shooting with an over/under double-barreled shotgun

Trap shooting is typically shot with a 12 gauge shotgun. Smaller gauge firearms (e.g., 16, 20, 24, 28, 32 gauge and .410 bore) can be used, but special consideration is given for use of a smaller gauge. Trap shooting is shot at either single or double target presentations. This refers to the number of clay targets which are launched simultaneously.

Both general purpose shotguns and more specialized target-type shotguns are used in trap shooting, and may be double-barreled or single-barreled. Shooters who shoot all sub-events will often buy a combination-set of a single and double barrel for shooting both singles and double targets respectively. Semi-automatic shotguns are also popular for recreational shooting due to the lower perceived recoil and versatility because they can be used for singles, handicap, and doubles. Shotguns used in trap shooting can differ from field and skeet guns in several ways and normally are designed with a higher "point of impact" as the targets are intended to be shot as they rise.

Trap shooting shotguns can be adjustable. Stocks may have a "Monte Carlo" (fixed, raised "comb") configuration and/or include a comb height adjustment, a butt plate adjustment for length, angle, or both. Trap guns typically have longer barrels of 762–863.6 mm (30.00–34.00 in), possibly with porting and featuring tighter chokes to compensate for the longer distances at which trap shooting targets are broken. The majority of trap shotguns built today feature interchangeable choke tubes as opposed to older guns, which used chokes of a "fixed" constriction. Interchangeable choke tubes can come in a variety of constrictions and may use names such as "modified", "improved cylinder", and "full". Trap guns are built to withstand the demands and stress of constant and lengthy repeated use—hundreds of shots in a single day of events, whereas typical field guns are built to be lighter, carried afield, and not shot in such quantity.

Common accessories include wearing a vest or pouch that will hold at least 25–50 cartridges. Most ranges and clubs require eye and ear protection due to the extremely loud environment and possible danger of using firearms.

Shooting glasses may be something as simple as the eyeglasses or sunglasses one presently wears. However, this is generally considered unsafe as standard eyeglasses and sunglasses are often not shatter proof. Specialized shooting glasses typically have interchangeable colored lenses, are adjustable, and are designed for high-impact resistance. A spectrum of different colored lenses are offered to compensate for light conditions as well as enhance the color of the target thrown while muting the color of the background. Adjustable glasses allow on-range changes for conditions of light, color, etc.

Hearing protection also comes in a variety of styles. Dense foam and electronics are used to reduce sound levels. Typical hearing protection is either an "earmuff" (worn over the ear) or an "ear plug" (worn in the ear canal). Some shooters use both simultaneously to gain greater noise reduction (NRR). There are also "ear plugs" molded to the shape of the ear, which can be used for listening to music while shooting.

=== Trap machines and target launching methods ===
Trap shooting requires the use of a target throwing device(s). American trap and DTL utilize a single trap machine, which is typically enclosed within a traphouse, downrange from the shooters' shooting positions. The house provides protection for the machine (e.g. from weather and errant shots) and also acts to obscure the machine's oscillating throwing position. International or Olympic trap employs 15 trap machines housed within a large elongated traphouse recessed into the ground to form a "bunker" which resembles a trench. International or Olympic trap may at times be referred to as bunker trap.

Modern automatic throwing machines can store hundreds of clay targets in a carousel and systematically self-load targets onto the throwing mechanism. Manual electric target throwers require a person in the trap house with the trap machine to set the target(s) by hand onto the machine arm. For both types, an electrical signal, from the push of a button or a sound-activated device, causes the trap machine to throw its targets after the shooter calls for their bird(s).

Temporary or informal trap shooting can utilize other methods to launch targets. The simplest is a "hand thrower" which is a hand-held arm which holds and releases that target when a person swings it. Another type of manual, non-electrical thrower utilizes a spring-loaded mechanism that is cocked and subsequently released by hand or foot.

== Ammunition ==
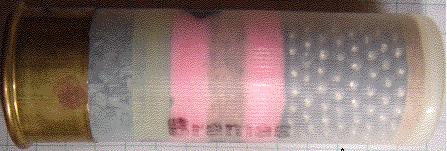
A 12-gauge shotgun cartridge in a transparent plastic casing, allowing the contents to be seen

Trap typically uses lead shot ammunition, with shot sizes (for lead shot) ranging between #7 ½ and #9 (2.4-2.0 mm). The major components of a shotgun cartridge are the "hull" (casing), "primer" (ignition device), "powder" (smokeless gunpowder), "wad" (shot cup and cushion), and "shot" (round pellets).

The "shot" consists of approximately 300–450 small spheres. Cartridges are allowed a maximum payload weight of 1 1/8 oz (32 g) of shot. Velocity may vary but is limited based upon shot mass: 1,290 feet per second (390 m/s) for 1 1/8 oz (32 g), 1,325 ft/s (404 m/s) for 1 oz (28 g), and 1,350 ft/s (410 m/s) for 7/8 oz (24 g). Maximum loads are generally only needed for longer "handicap" yardages or the second shot in double trap. Steel shot, which may be required at certain trap clubs or ranges, is used with slightly larger shot size (e.g. #6 or #7).

Reloading or self-loading of ammunition is popular among a segment of trap shooters, due in part to the sheer quantity of ammunition used in trap shooting as well as the fact that many ranges will have casings that are used only once and are able to be obtained by people who reload their own cartridges at little to no cost.

== History ==
Trap shooting has been around since the 18th century. A publication known as Sporting Magazine states that by the year 1793, trap shooting was "well established" in England. The first recorded organized trap shooting in the United States is likely to have taken place at the Sportsman's Club of Cincinnati, Ohio in 1831. Originally, live birds were used as targets, released from under hats. Glass balls came into use as targets in the 1860s and began to partially replace live birds, but live targets are still used in some parts of the United States. The glass ball targets were invented by Charles Portlock, of Boston, and were used by notable shooters such as Annie Oakley, Doc Carver, and Capt. A. H. Bogardus. Most of the glass ball targets were made of colorless glass and had a diameter of 2 1/2 inches (6.4 cm). Some targets were filled with colored powder to indicate a hit and add a visual effect. For the shooters who liked live game sport, targets were filled with feathers.

Bogardus took up glass ball and clay pigeon shooting in 1868, and went on to win many championships. He was known as one of the most successful trap shooters in the early years of the sport. In the spring of 1883, he was defeated by a competitive shooter named Doc Carver. Carver idolized Bogardus and other renowned shooters. He attempted to attract the great Bogardus, but it wasn't until six years later that the two legends finally came together for a match, and the winner was the less-experienced Doc Carver. Carver won 19 out of 25 matches. In most of those matches they used Ligowsky targets.

In 1880, "clay" birds (disks) were invented by a man named Fred Kimble, although George Ligowsky took credit for the invention. The Ligowsky target was used widely in the early trap shooting community as a replacement for the glass ball targets. The downside of the Ligowsky targets was that they were too hard to break when hit. Fred Kimble made a more breakable target. Unlike the Ligowsky target, which was made of hard baked clay, the Kimble target was made of coal-tar, pitch, and other ingredients.

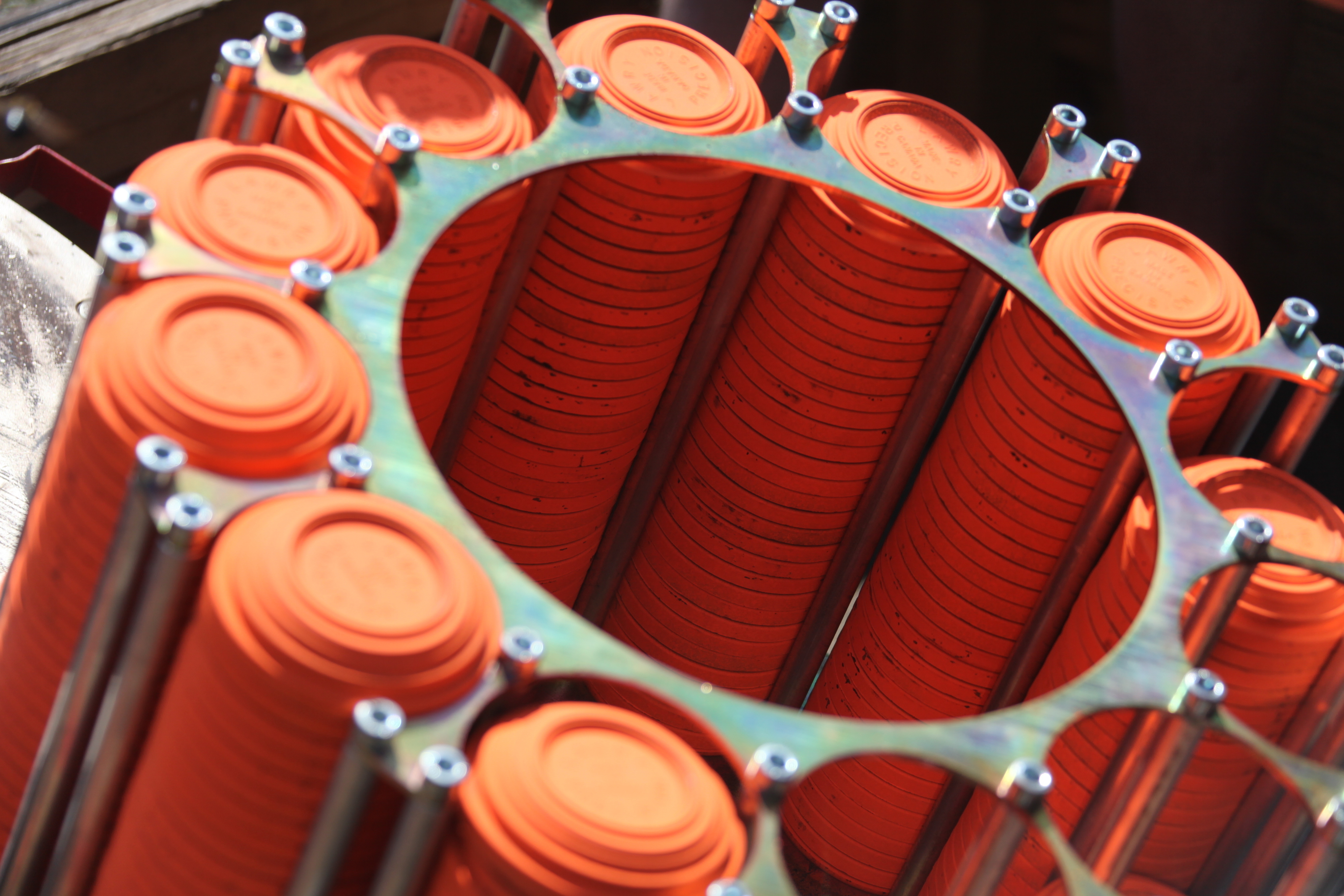
A modern, automatic trap machine.

There were many different types of target throwers, also known as “traps,” like one made by Bogardus, which was made to throw glass targets. This trap was able to throw the targets for a distance of 28 to 35 yards (26 to 32 m). It was operated by a person behind the shooter, who pulled a string and released an elastic spring, launching the target. The first automatic trap machine to launch clay targets was used in 1909. Following the invention of the automatic trap machines, doubles trap was introduced. It was a big success in the competition community. In the 1912 Olympics, Jay Graham became the first American to win the gold medal in doubles trap.

Three years later, in 1915 the American Amateur Trapshooting Association (AATA) was formed with John Philip Sousa as president. This organization was the first organized and run by amateurs. When the AATA was disbanded in 1919, it was absorbed by an organization called the American Trapshooting Association. In 1923, the American Trapshooting Association was renamed Amateur Trapshooting Association, and the same organization is still active today.

== International versions ==
=== Olympic trap (bunker trap) ===
Olympic trap, also known as international and/or bunker trap, is one of the ISSF shooting events, introduced to the Olympic program in 1900; the current version was introduced in 1950. In international competitions the course of fire is 125 shots for men and 75 shots for women. There is a 25-shot final for the top six competitors.

Olympic trap uses 15 fixed-angle machines as opposed to the single oscillating machine used in American trap or DTL. The 15-machine, computer-controlled program is designed to deliver 10 left, 10 right and 5 straight-away targets to each competitor in a randomized sequence. A microphone release system is employed to provide uniformity in target release times.

The process of a round is as follows: There are six shooters, one to each station, with the sixth shooter initially starting at a holding station immediately behind shooter number one. At the beginning of first round of the day, test firing is allowed at the referee's permission. Upon receiving the start signal, the first shooter has 10 seconds to call for his target. After firing at his target, the first shooter waits for the second shooter to complete firing, then moves to station two, with the shooter on station six smoothly moving to station one. This procedure continues through the squad until the completion of the round.

Generally, the round is refereed by a person on the line, behind the shooters. They use a bicycle-type horn, or similar, to signal lost targets. The referee is assisted by one or two flankers to either side of the bunker who keep score. With modern technology, computer screens may be used both at the bunker and in the club house to show the rounds' progress. In major matches, there is a board, perhaps 1 m × 2.5 m (3.3 ft × 8.2 ft), to one side that shows the scoring status clearly to all with large tiles: white to show hits, red to show misses.

The guns may be loaded—but open-actioned—between stations 1 through 5. Guns must be unloaded and open in the walk from station five back to one. The unloading must be done before the shooter makes the turn to step off station five. This open action requirement alone tends to discourage the use of auto-loading shotguns, as it is time-consuming to unload if the second shell is not used. Additionally, there are issues of reliability and the loss of the advantage which a more open choke of the over-under shotgun type can provide for the first shot.

Since the UIT, now ISSF, mandated the 24 gram (7/8 ounce) shot load in 1991, chokes have tended to become tighter. Often competitors will use 0.64–0.72 mm (0.025–0.028 in) for the first barrel and 0.80–1.00 mm (0.031–0.039 in) for the second. Guns are regulated to shoot dead on or, at most 5–8 cm (2.0–3.1 in) high. Considerable effort is expended to ensure a perfect fit as the relatively high 100 km/h (62 mph) exit speed of the target allows no time for conscious compensation of a poor fit as it so often can occur in the slower 64 km/h (40 mph) exit speed target games of American trap and skeet.

=== Double trap ===
Double trap is a relatively new trap form. An Olympic event since 1996 (from 2008 it has Olympic status only for men), two targets are thrown simultaneously but at slightly different angles from the station three bank of machines. The target speed is about 80 km/h (50 mph), very close to that of ATA doubles.

The only unique item is that the targets are released with a variable delay up to 1 second. This was instituted to minimize the practice of spot-shooting the first target.

The ISSF has continuously adjusted the difficulties of its disciplines (trap, skeet, and double trap) to minimize the number of perfect scores, unlike ATA/NSSA where perfect scores are the norm. Missing a single target in a large ATA or NSSA match means the competitor has a limited chance of winning, whereas missing a target in Bunker or International Trap still allows a competitor a good shot at victory.

With her victory in women's skeet shooting at the 2012 London Olympic games, Kim Rhode became the first American to win medals in five successive Olympic games. Her prior Olympic medals were for doubles trap shooting in 1996, 2000, and 2004 and for skeet shooting in 2008.

== Nationally and regionally recognized versions ==
=== American trap ===
American trap is popular throughout the United States and may be the most popular form of clay target shooting in North America. It is widely practiced at clubs and facilities that offer trap shooting.

Trap shooting outside of any official event is common and arguably the majority of American trap shooting. Most official events are governed by the Amateur Trapshooting Association or ATA and its rules. The ATA is the primary governing body of American trap shooting and is one of the largest shooting sports organizations in the world. The Pacific International Trap Association (PITA) is an independent governing body, and is active in the western US and British Columbia. PITA rules are nearly identical to ATA rules. Trapshooting outside of official events follows ATA rules and norms to widely varying degrees.

The ATA hosts the Grand American World Trap Shooting Championships, which is held every August. After decades in Vandalia, Ohio, the "Grand" moved to the new World Shooting and Recreational Complex in Sparta, Illinois. The Grand attracts 4,500 (2015 numbers) shooters for the thirteen-day event. It was billed as the world's largest shooting event until the USA High School Clay Target League's Minnesota Trap Shooting Championship held in Alexandria, MN reached over 5,000 participants in June, 2015. The Grand American is still the largest ATA event.

The ATA sanctions registered trap shooting competitions at local clubs and facilities throughout North America, and it coordinates Zone competitions leading up to the Grand American each summer along with "Satellite Grands" throughout the U.S. State organizations hold state championship shoots each year, which are coordinated with and sanctioned by the ATA.

American Trap is broken down into three categories: singles, doubles, and handicap. The targets are thrown by a machine located at approximately ground level and covered by a "trap house." For singles and doubles, there are five "stations", each 16 yards (14.6 m) behind the trap house. In singles, each competitor shoots at five targets from each station. The trap machine oscillates left to right within a 54 degree arc (up to 27 degrees right and left of center), and at least a 34 degree arc (up to 17 degrees right and left of center)., and the competitor does not know where in that arc the target will emerge. In doubles, the machine does not oscillate, but throws two targets simultaneously with each competitor shooting at five pairs (10 targets) from each station. In the handicap events, the machine operates the same as in singles, but the shooters stand farther away from the trap house.

Recent changes specify a minimum handicap yardage of 19 yards (17.4 m). Each time a competitor wins an event or shoots a score of 96 or higher, s/he may earn additional yardage (also known as "getting a punch"), and must thereafter shoot from farther away from the traphouse. The increase in effective distance is designed to increase difficulty. The maximum distance at which a handicap sub-event is shot is 27 yards (24.7 m). Safety regulations prohibit members of a handicap squad from shooting at varying yardages of more than 2–3 yards (1.8–2.7 m) apart, depending upon the handicap classification. In American Trap, there will no more than two yards difference between adjacent shooters and a total difference of three yards in a squad. A shooter is allowed only one shot per target. Unless the target was an illegal target, in which case the target is either broken or has broken regulations the shooter may reshoot that bird.

When shooting American Trap for practice or competition, a squad of up to five individuals will shoot a "round" of trap which equals 25 targets per participant. Registered ATA events may require each shooter to shoot 50, 100 or 200 targets, depending upon the scheduled sub-event. Many of these shoots are for personal average or handicap yardage.

ATA rules specify that shotgun gauges larger than 12 gauge (such as 10 gauge) are not permissible. Maximum shot velocity is 1290 FPS (Feet Per Second) for shot charges up to 1 1/8 oz. and 1325 FPS for shot charges up to 1 oz.

A variant of standard trap is Wobble or Wobble trap. The main difference is a more variable target flight path than in standard trap shooting because the trap machine oscillates up and down as well as side to side. Shooters are allowed two shots per pull, and shooters at stations 1 and 5 stand at the 18 yards (16.5 m) mark while positions 2–4 stand at the 17 yards (15.5 m) mark. Although this version of trap is not sanctioned by the ATA, many shooters consider it to be both more challenging and engaging as well as a more realistic preparation for bird hunting.

=== Other nationally and regionally recognized forms ===
Down-The-Line (DTL) is a form of trap popular in Great Britain, Australia, and South Africa. The trap machine oscillates left to right within a 45 degree arc and each competitor shoots in turn, then moves station after having attempted 5 targets from each station in each round of 25 targets. Two shots are permitted at each target, but second shots incur a points penalty. 3 points are awarded for each first-barrel hit, 2 points for a second-barrel hit, and 0 for a miss. A perfect score in a 100-target competition is written as 100/300. The points score, rather than the number of targets hit, determines the winner and is used to determine classifications (AA, A, B and C class).

In the Nordic countries and Great Britain (which is part of the Nordic Shooting Region), a form of trap formerly known as Hunter's trap and now as Nordic trap is popular. It is easier than the Olympic version.

== Technique ==
The technique for trap shooting is fundamentally different from rifle or pistol shooting. The latter shoots one projectile and aims to place accurately at a usually stationary target, and usually with at least a few seconds to aim. Trap shooting involves shooting hundreds of pellets at a time, at a target that is moving quickly downrange, and often quickly laterally, typically with less than a second to move the gun and fire. Most shotguns have a bead at the end of the rib, located on top of the barrel(s), and a smaller bead halfway down the rib, used for aiming the firearm. Instructors generally refer to the process as "pointing" the shotgun rather than aiming it.

== Champion shooters ==
Notable champion shooters include:

- Capt. Adam Henry Bogardus, born on a farm on Ravine Road in 1834, became the World Champion and United States Champion trap shooter. He is credited with romanticizing trap shooting and he invented the first practical glass ball trap in 1877. He and his sons were renowned crack shots that toured with the Buffalo Bill's Wild West Show. He is in the Trapshooting Hall of Fame.
- William Frank Carver, "Doc" William Frank Carver (1840–1927), defeated Captain Adam Henry Bogardus, World Champion and United States Champion trap shooter, 19 times in a series of 25 matches.

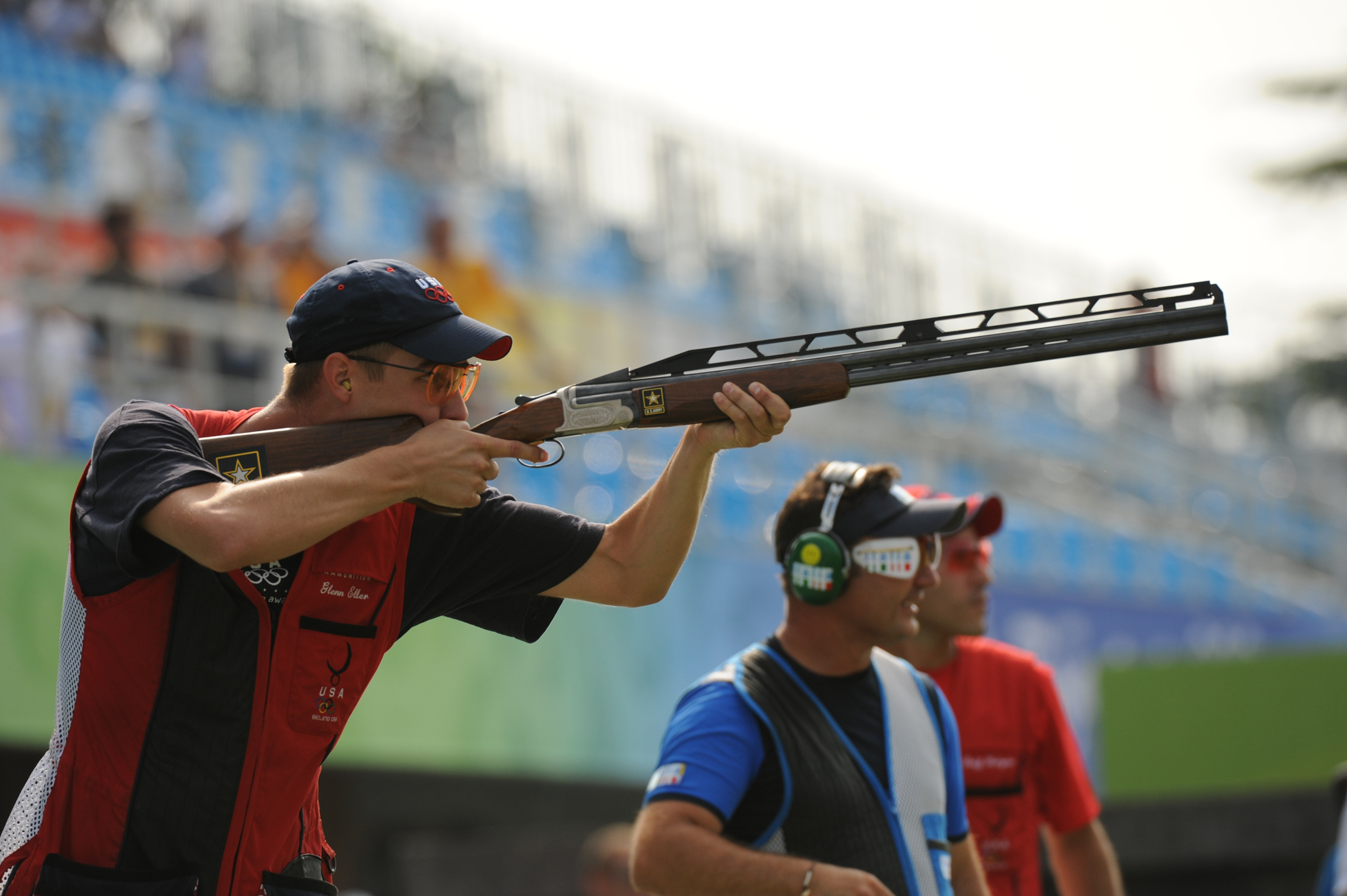
Glenn Eller at the 2008 Summer Olympics double trap finals

- Vic Reinders (1906–1995), won eleven Grand American championships, including the Clay Target Championship in 1958, and has the distinction of being on more All-American teams than any other shooter in history. He is a member of the Trapshooting Hall of Fame, the Wisconsin Trapshooting Association Hall of Fame, and the Wisconsin Athletic Hall of Fame.
- SFC Glenn Eller, won the gold medal in double trap at the 2008 Summer Olympics in Beijing and has won double trap gold 12 additional times in International Shooting Sport Federation sanctioned events.
- Col. Rajyavardhan Singh Rathore, won the silver medal while representing India in double trap at the 2004 Summer Olympics in Athens and won gold medals in double trap in 2004 and 2006 ISSF World Cup events. He is a two-time winner of the Commonwealth Games gold medal in individual double trap.
- Harlan Campbell Jr., won over 125 Grand American awards, including three All-Around and two High Overall championships, and over 60 Satellite Grand titles. He is a member of the Trapshooting Hall of Fame and the Kansas Trapshooting Association Hall of Fame.
- Kim Rhode, a six-time U.S. Olympic medal winner (1996–2016 games) including three gold medals and six-time national champion in double trap. She won a gold medal in skeet shooting at the 2012 Summer Olympics, equaling the world record of 99 out of 100 clays.
- Susan Nattrass O.C. Ph.D., born in Medicine Hat, Alberta. Competing at an elite international level since 1970s, Nattrass has had multiple appearances, in one or both of trap or double trap, at Olympic Games, Commonwealth Games, World Championships, and Pan American Games. Nattrass is a 7-Time World Champion and repeat medalist at the Commonwealth Games, World Championships, and Pan American Games. As of the 2012 Olympics, Nattrass is one of only 122 athletes (and one of only 46 still active), all sports, to compete in at least six Olympic Games, appearing in 1976, '88, '92, 2000, '04 and '08. She won a gold medal at the World Championships in 1974, '75, '77, '78, '79, '81, and 2006. She is also a member of the Canadian Sports Hall of Fame and the Amateur Trapshooting Association Hall of Fame.

== Youth shooting in the United States ==
Trap shooting is becoming ever more popular among younger shooters. There are a number of programs geared towards encouraging youth shooting.

The USA High School Clay Target League is the largest youth clay target shooting program in the world, with nearly 50,000 participants yearly. The USAHSCTL runs high-school trap shooting leagues in various states nationwide, the largest of which is Minnesota, where 12,000 students from nearly 450 schools compete. All teams in USAHSCTL leagues are school-sanctioned as a prerequisite for team/league formation. The Minnesota State High School Clay Target League Championship is the largest trap shooting event in the world with over 8,000 student athletes participating in 2018. The League's motto is "Safety, Fun, Marksmanship - In that order."

The Scholastic Clay Target Program (SCTP) is the second largest clay target program in the country, with just under 15,000 participants. SCTP promotes gun safety, personal responsibility, and sportsmanship among primary and secondary students. Teams compete at the local, state, and national level. Athletes are divided into four divisions based on academic grade level and experience: Rookie (fifth grade and below), Intermediate (sixth through eighth grades), Junior Varsity (ninth through twelfth grades), and Varsity (eleventh and twelfth grades with at least two years of experience at the Junior Varsity level). Trophies and college scholarships are awarded to third place, runner-up, and champion squads in each division at the SCTP National Championships, which are held concurrently with the first two days of the Grand American Trapshooting Championships in Sparta, Illinois.

The Amateur Trapshooting Association launched its youth program, AIM in October 2008. With about 3,000 participants, the program, focusing on academics, integrity, and marksmanship, seeks to provide a safe and positive experience with firearms for youth, elementary through college age. AIM encourages good sportsmanship and personal responsibility through competition in order to make trap shooting a lifelong avocation. Categories and classes are designed to create a more level playing field and encourage genuine competition. Age based categories are established on the birthday of the shooter. Categories are Pre-Sub (11 and under), Sub-Junior (12–14), Junior (15–18) and Graduates/Collegiate (18–23). For purposes of determining age category the category declared by the participant on the first day he/she shoots shall be used. AIM Shooters have the opportunity to compete at local and State/Provincial levels as well as at the Grand American World Trapshooting Championships. The AIM Program offers the opportunity to compete in a unique sport that is heavily reliant on mental focus as well as enjoy the thrill and excitement of registered trap shooting.

To encourage young shooters, the ATA provides "special categories" for younger shooters who compete at ATA events. These categories include 'Junior' class for shooters who have not turned 18, and 'Sub-junior' for those not yet 15 as of the beginning of the ATA trap year (September 1). The ATA also allows shooters under the age of 18 to shoot for half-price at the Grand American as well as many other large ATA sponsored shoots. The ATA and state organizations such as the Texas Trapshooters' Association (TTA) award scholarships to college bound trap shooters based on citizenship, scholarship, and need. Numerous former TTA junior shooters are now attending college with the help of TTA and ATA scholarships.

Additionally, non-scholarship college teams are growing in popularity. Leading college trap teams include those from Texas A & M, Purdue, Virginia Tech, and Lindenwood (MO). Teams from these schools dominate the U.S. intercollegiate trap championships.

== See also ==
- Double trap
- International Shooting Sport Federation
- ISSF Olympic trap
- ISSF shooting events
- FITASC
