= Skeet shooting =

Sport in which players use shotguns to hit clay disks

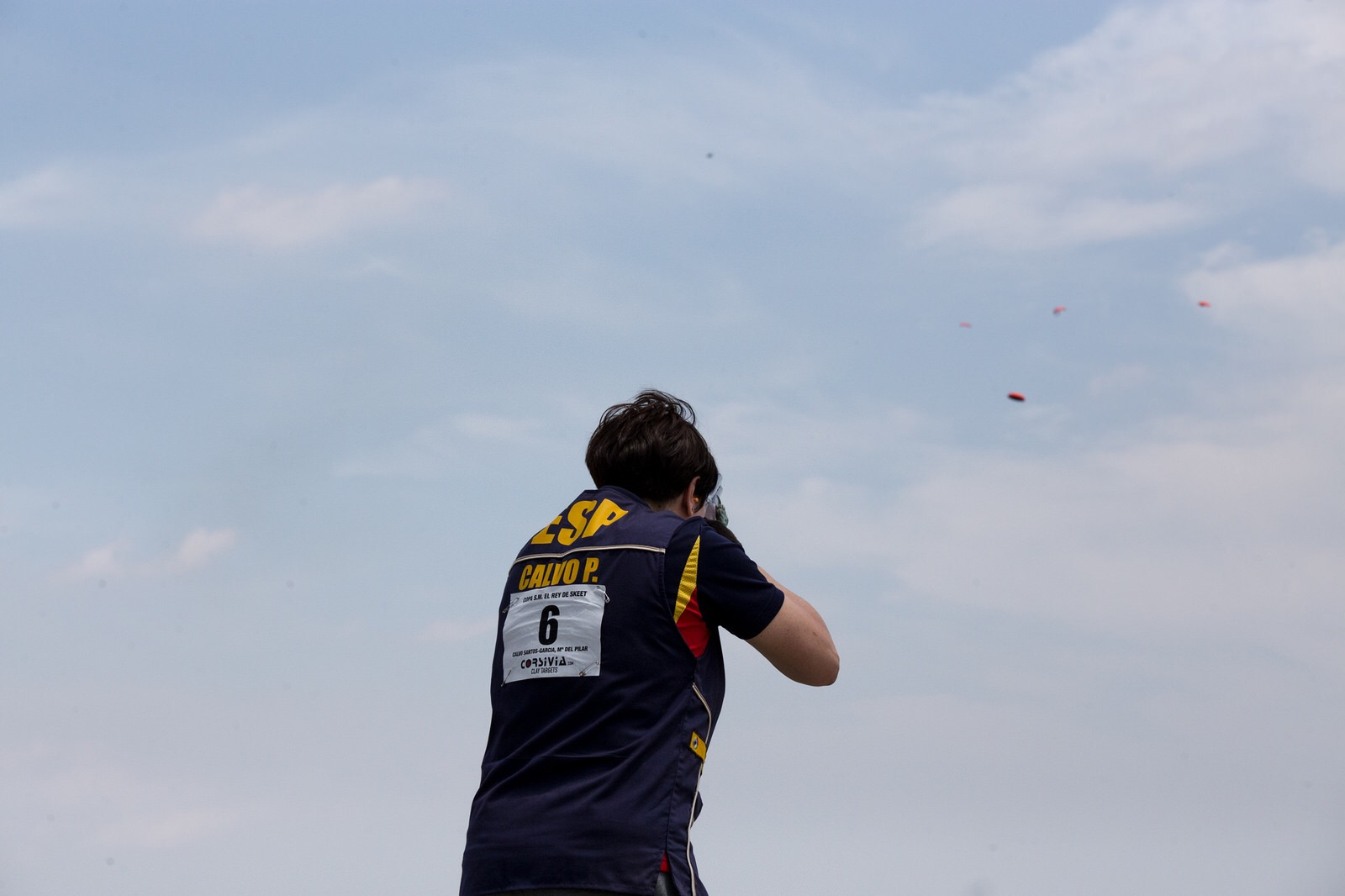

Men
- Number of targets: 125 + 60
- Olympic Games: Since 1968
- Abbreviation: SK125

Women
- Number of targets: 125 + 60
- Olympic Games: Since 2000
- Abbreviation: SK125W

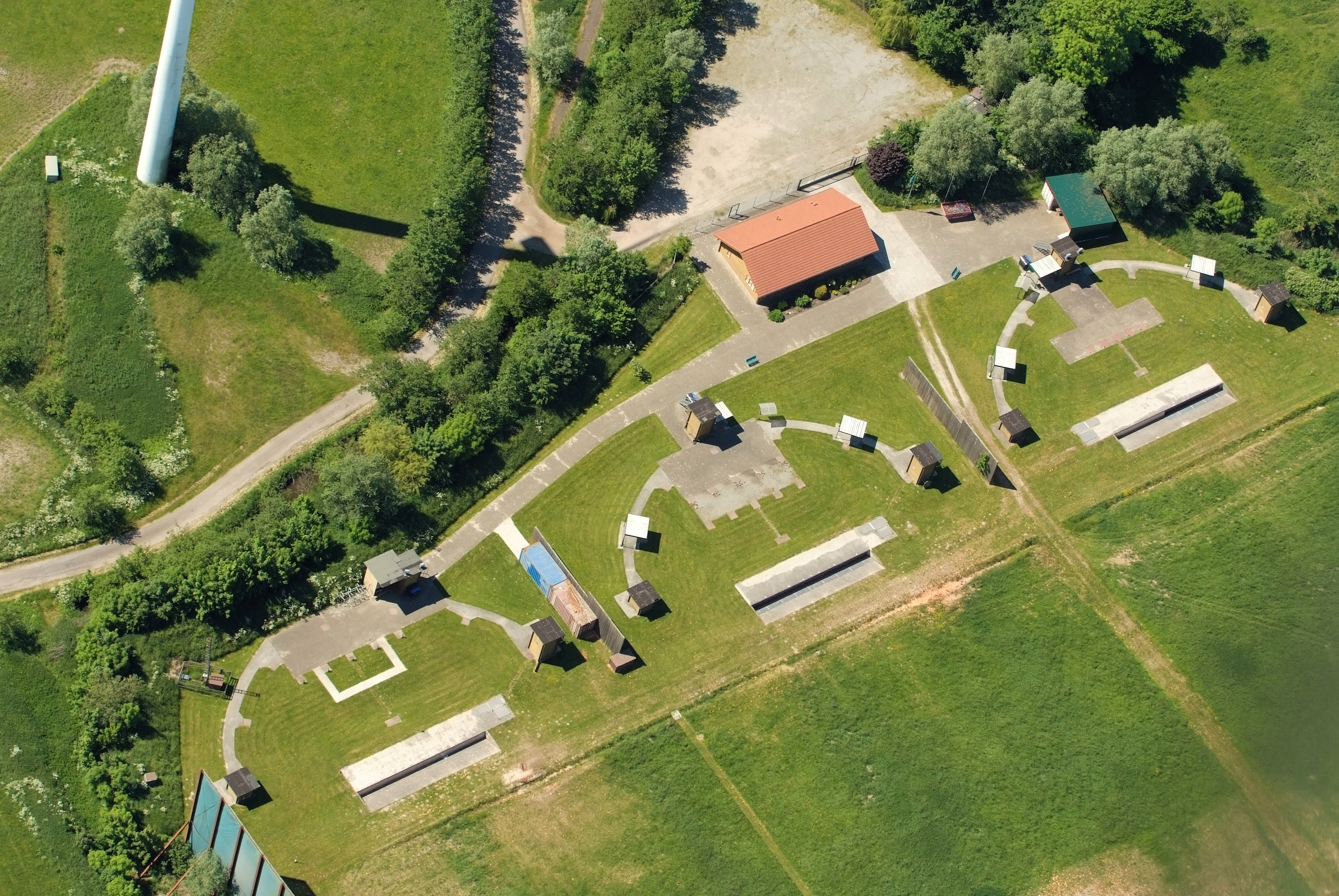
Aerial view of a skeet shooting range in Cuxhaven, Wilhelmshaven, Germany

Skeet shooting is a recreational and competitive activity whose participants use shotguns to attempt to break clay targets which two fixed stations mechanically fling into the air at high speed and at a variety of angles.

Skeet is one of the three major disciplines of competitive clay shooting—alongside trap shooting and sporting clays. There are several types of skeet, including one with Olympic status (often called "Olympic skeet" or "international skeet"), and many with only national recognition.

== General principles ==
Illustration of skeet game

For the American version of the sport, the clay discs are 4 5/16 inches (109.54 mm) in diameter, 1 1/8 inches (28.58 mm) thick, and fly a distance of 62 yards (57 m).

The international version of skeet uses a target that is slightly larger in diameter [(110±1) mm vs. 109.54 mm], thinner in cross-section [(25.5±.5) mm vs. 28.58 mm], and has a thicker dome center, making it harder to break. International targets are also thrown a longer distance from similar heights, at over 70 yards (64 m), resulting in higher target speed.

The firearm of choice for this task is usually a high-quality, double-barreled over and under shotgun with 24- to 32-inch barrels and very open chokes. Often, shooters will choose an improved cylinder choke (one with a tighter pattern) or a skeet choke (one with a wider pattern), but this is a matter of preference. Some gun shops refer to this type of shotgun as a skeet gun. Skeet chokes are designed to produce a 30-inch shot pattern at 21 yards.

Alternatively, a sporting gun or a trap gun is sometimes used. These have longer barrels (up to 34 inches) and tighter choke. Many shooters of American skeet and other national versions use semi-automatic shotguns and break-open over-and-under shotguns.

The event is in part meant to simulate the action of bird hunting. The shooter shoots from seven positions on a semicircle with a radius of 21 yards (19 m), and an eighth position halfway between stations 1 and 7. There are two houses that hold devices known as "traps" that launch the targets, one at each corner of the semicircle. The traps launch the targets to a point 15 feet (4.6 m) above the ground and 18 feet (5.5 m) outside of station 8. One trap launches targets from 10 feet (3.0 m) above the ground ("high" house) and the other launches it from 3 feet (0.91 m) above the ground ("low" house).

At stations 1 and 2 the shooter shoots at single targets launched from the high house and then the low house, then shoots a double where the two targets are launched simultaneously but shooting the high house target first. At stations 3, 4, and 5 the shooter shoots at single targets launched from the high house and then the low house. At stations 6 and 7 the shooter shoots at single targets launched from the high house and then the low house, then shoots a double, shooting the low house target first then the high house target. At station 8 the shooter shoots one high target and one low target.

The shooter must then re-shoot his first missed target or, if no targets are missed, must shoot his 25th shell at the low house station 8. This 25th shot was once referred to as the shooter's option, as he was able to take it where he preferred. Now, to speed up rounds in competition, the shooter must shoot the low 8 twice for a perfect score.

== History ==
Charles Davis and William Harnden Foster of Andover, Massachusetts, invented skeet shooting. In 1920, Davis, an avid grouse hunter, and Foster, an avid hunter, painter, illustrator and author of New England Grouse Hunting, developed a game which was informally called "shooting around the clock". The original course took the form of a circle with a radius of 25 yards with its circumference marked off like the face of a clock and a trap set at the 12-o'clock position. The practice of shooting from all directions had to cease, however, when a chicken farm started next door. The game evolved to its current setup by 1923, when one of the shooters, Foster, solved the problem by placing a second trap at the 6-o'clock position and cutting the course in half. Foster quickly noticed the appeal of that kind of competition shooting, and set out to make it a national sport.

The sport was introduced in the February 1926 issues of National Sportsman and Hunting and Fishing magazines, and a prize of 100 dollars was offered to anyone who could come up with a name for the new sport. The winning entry was "skeet", chosen by Gertrude Hurlbutt. The word allegedly derived from the Norwegian word for "shoot" (skyt). The first National Skeet Championship took place in 1926. Shortly thereafter, the National Skeet Shooting Association formed. During World War II the American military used skeet shooting to teach gunners the principles of leading and timing on a flying target.

For his role in perfecting and developing the sport, William Foster was named as one of the first members to the National Skeet Shooters Association Hall of Fame in 1970, and is now known as "The Father of Skeet".

== Olympic skeet ==
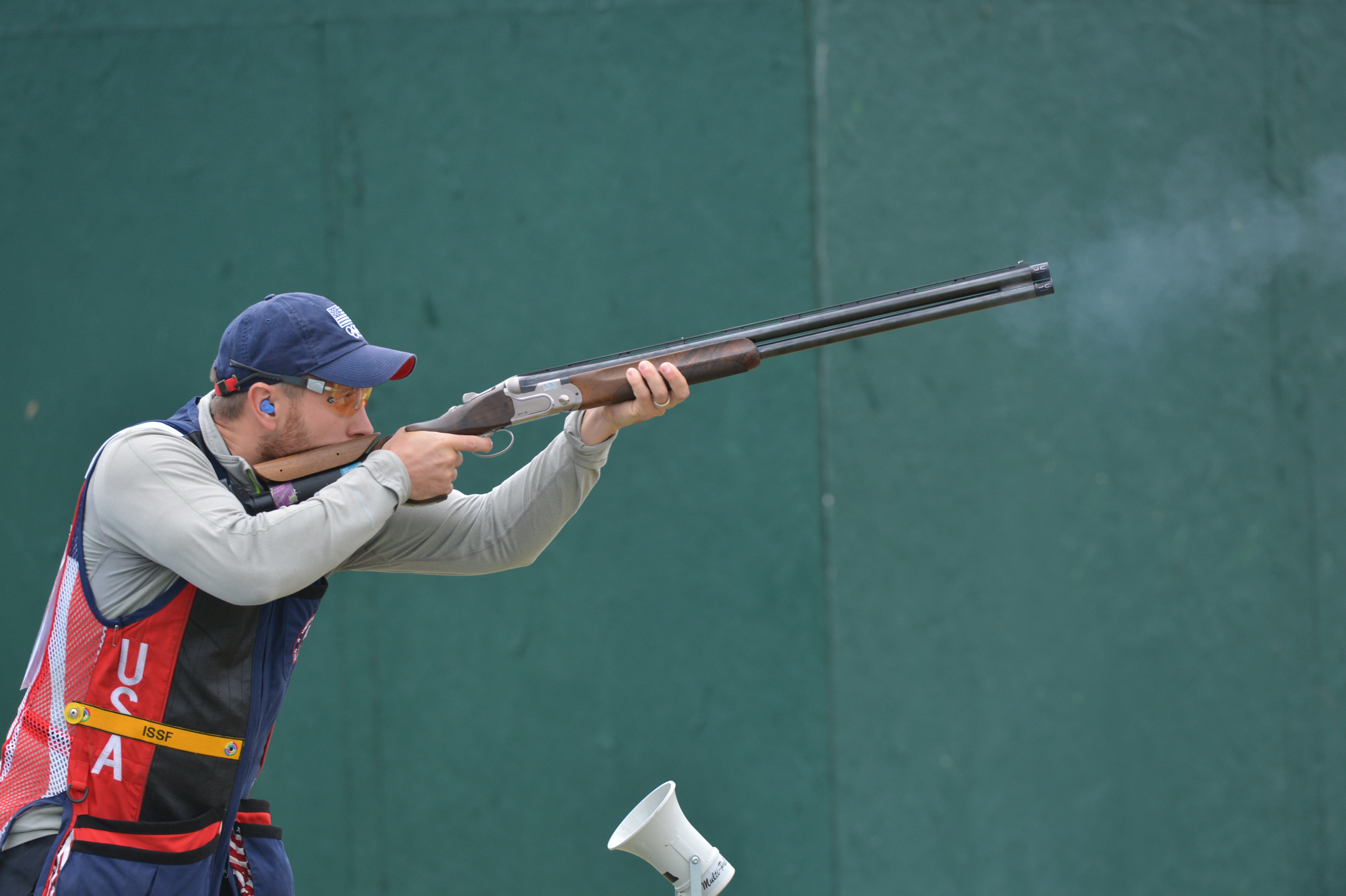
Vincent Hancock shooting skeet at the 2016 Summer Olympics.

Olympic and international skeet is one of the ISSF shooting events. It has had Olympic status since 1968, and, until 1992, was open to both sexes. After that year, all ISSF events have been open to men only, and so women were disallowed to compete in the Olympic skeet competitions in 1996. This was controversial because the 1992 Olympic Champion, Zhang Shan of China, was a woman. However, women continued to have their own World Championships, and in 2000, a separate women's skeet event was introduced to the Olympic program.

In Olympic skeet, there is a random delay of between 0 and 3 seconds after the shooter has called for the target. Also, the shooter must hold his gun so that the buttstock is at mid-torso level until the target appears.

Another difference with American skeet is that the sequence to complete the 25 targets in a round of Olympic skeet requires shooters to shoot at doubles, not only in stations 1, 2, 6, and 7, as in American skeet, but also on 3, 4, and 5. This includes a reverse double (low house first) on station 4. This last double was introduced in the sequence starting in 2005.

With her bronze in women's skeet shooting at the 2016 Rio Olympic games, Kim Rhode became the first American to medal at six successive Olympic games. Her prior Olympic medals were for trap shooting in 1996, 2000 and 2004 and for skeet shooting in 2008 and 2012.

== US national variant ==
American skeet is administered by the National Skeet Shooting Association (NSSA). The targets are shot in a different order and are slower than in Olympic skeet. There is also no delay after the shooter has called for them, and the shooter may do this with the gun held "up", i.e. pre-mounted on the shoulder (as is allowed in trap shooting).

A full tournament is typically conducted over the course of five events. These include four events each shot with a different maximum permissible gauge. These gauges are 12, 20, 28, and .410 bore. The fifth event, usually shot first in a five event competition, is Doubles, during which a pair of targets is thrown simultaneously at stations 1 through 7, and then from station 6 back through either station 2 or 1, depending on the round. The maximum gauge permitted in Doubles is 12 gauge. Each of the five events usually consists of 100 targets (four standard boxes of ammunition). All ties in potential winning scores are broken by shoot offs, usually sudden death by station, and usually shot as doubles, from stations 3, 4 and 5. Tournament management has the right to change the shoot format with respect to the order in which events are conducted, the number of events in a given shoot, and the rules governing shoot offs.

Each event normally constitutes a separate championship. In addition, the scores in the four singles events are combined to crown a High Over All ("HOA") champion for the tournament, a coveted title. On occasion, the scores for all five events are also combined, to determine the High All Around ("HAA") champion.

The requisite use of the small bore shotguns, including the difficult .410, is a major differentiation between the American version of the sport and the international version. Some would argue that it makes the American version at least as difficult as the International version, though perhaps at greater expense, given the necessity of one or more guns capable of shooting in all events.

Recognizing that a high level of perfection is beyond the skill, interest, or time available to most shooters, NSSA competitions are subdivided into several classes, each based on the running average score shot over the last five most recent events shot in each gauge, prior to any given competition. This permits shooters of roughly equal ability at the relevant point in time to compete against each other for the individual and HOA titles in their class.

Other national versions of skeet (e.g., English skeet) typically make similar changes to the rules to make them easier or more difficult.

== See also ==
- ISSF Olympic skeet
- ISSF shooting events
- Trap shooting
- Double trap
- International Shooting Sport Federation
- U.S. intercollegiate trap and skeet shooting champions
