= Sporting clays =

Form of clay pigeon shooting

- First played: Early 1900s

Characteristics
- Type: Clay pigeon shooting
- Equipment: Shotgun

Presence
- Country or region: Worldwide

Sporting clays is a form of clay pigeon shooting, often described as "golf with a shotgun" because a typical course includes from 10 to 15 different shooting stations laid out over natural terrain.

Unlike trap and skeet, which are games of repeatable target presentations, sporting clays simulates the unpredictability of live-quarry shooting, offering a great variety of trajectories, angles, speeds, elevations, distances, and target sizes.

== History ==
In the early 1900s, a number of British shooting schools adopted the use of clay targets to practice for driven-game shoots. Sporting Clays was originally used with live pigeons in the early 1900s, until they started using clay targets. When clay target began being used the sport became more popular. Rather than using standard distances, target angles and sizes, sporting clay courses are designed to simulate the hunting of ducks, pheasants, and even rabbits. Sporting clays makes it easier to practice bird hunting in the off-season because you can practice a flight pattern you struggle with or just practice for fun. After, clay target shooting quickly attracted a large following. The first British Open, England's premier sporting clays competition, was held in 1925. Sporting Clays was introduced to American shooters by Bob Brister in his feature article in Field & Stream magazine in July 1980. On September 27, 1980, the first Sporting Clays shoot was held at Remington's Lordship Gun Club in Connecticut. Ninety shooters participated, including executives from the National Shooting Sports Foundation (NSSF). The following spring, at Bob Brister's suggestion, the legendary Chris Cradock from England designed a Sporting Clays venue at Remington Farms, which was used to introduce the sport to Outdoor Writers. In 1982, the oldest continuous Sporting Clays competitive event (The Norbert Buchmayer Society annual Gathering of Friends) began and continues to this day. In 1985, the United States Sporting Clays Association (USSCA) was formed in Houston, TX. Also in 1985, the Orvis Company sponsored the first U.S. National Sporting Clays Championship, which was held in Houston, Texas and continues to promote the sport via the annual Orvis Cup held at Sandanona Shooting Grounds. In 1989, the National Skeet Shooting Association (NSSA) in San Antonio, Texas, formed the National Sporting Clays Association (NSCA) to provide governance and promote Sporting Clays. Today sporting clays is one of the fastest growing sports in America, with more than three million people of all ages participating both competitively and recreationally.

Pictures of courses, tower shooting and walk-up (Quail Walk) shooting have frequented magazines in the United States all the way back to 1912. Edward Cave wrote an article in 1913 called "Clay Bird Golf" which included a diagram of his shooting course with all types of target presentations and two towers. The name may have been new in 1980, but the game has been played in America for over 100 years and several of today's target arrangements were known to have been used as early as 1884, and probably earlier.

== Equipment and safety ==
Because the sport is popular with a wide variety of shotgun enthusiasts, the shotguns used do not fit an exact standard; however, every shotgun used for sporting clays must be capable of shooting two cartridges of 12 gauge or smaller. The most popular shotgun configurations are over-and-under, semiautomatic, and pump-action, using traditional cartridge shot sizes of 9, 8, or 7.5.

Safety is an important part of sporting clays. Proper ear and eye protection are mandatory, and firearms safety procedures, as listed in the National Sporting Clays Association (NSCA) Rule Book, must be followed at all times while on a course.

== Course layout and play ==
A typical course consists of 10 to 15 stations, with each station presenting targets from trap machines laid around a field or a trail through the woods, every course will be different. Targets are thrown from any angle or distance, to simulate the flight of a bird and sometimes rabbit. There are six different sizes of targets, ranging from minis to standards. Usually 6 to 10 targets are shot at each station by a squad of up to six shooters for a total outing of 50 to 100 targets per person. Targets are thrown in pairs. A pair of targets may be thrown as a true pair (or sim pair, i.e., thrown at the same time), as a following pair (thrown sequentially), or on report (the second clay launched on the firing of the shooter's gun). Numerous hunting conditions can be simulated by combining various speeds and angles with different types of clay targets. Each station is unique. Throughout a course, the shooters might see targets crossing from either side, coming inward, going outward, flying straight up, rolling on the ground, arcing high in the air, or thrown from towers. The possible target presentations are limited only by safety considerations, the terrain, and the imagination of the course designer. The configuration of the stations is often changed to maintain interest for the shooters and for environmental preservation of the course.

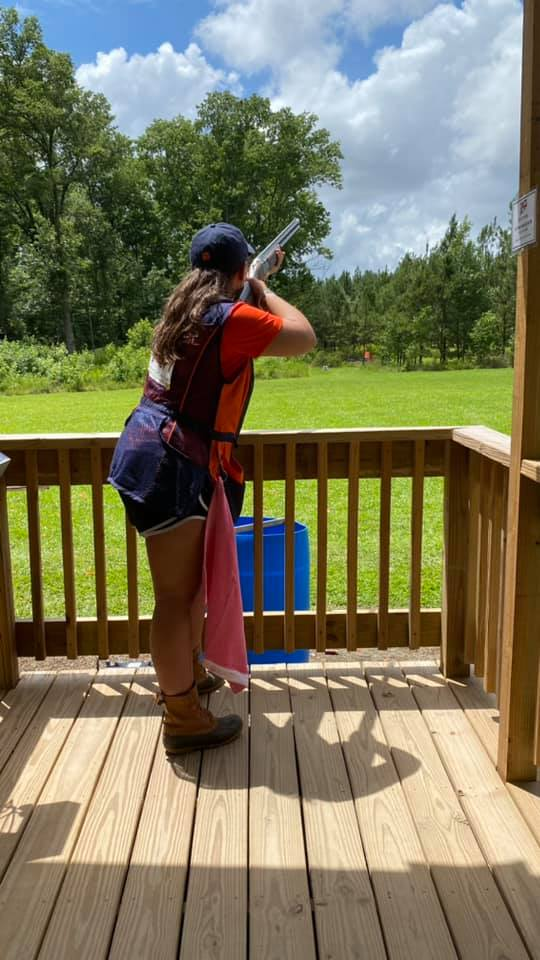
Sporting Clays being shot, Back Woods Quail Club, South Carolina
