= Shooting at the 1984 Summer Olympics – Mixed skeet =

Sports shooting at the Olympics

Mixed skeet at the Games of the XXIII Olympiad
- Venue: Los Angeles, United States
- Date: August 2–4, 1984
- Competitors: 69 from 41 nations

Medalists
1st place, gold medalist(s)		Matthew Dryke	United States
2nd place, silver medalist(s)		Ole Riber Rasmussen	Denmark
3rd place, bronze medalist(s)		Luca Scribani Rossi	Italy

The mixed skeet was a shooting sports event held as part of the Shooting at the 1984 Summer Olympics programme. The competition was held between August 2 and 4, 1984 at the shooting ranges in Los Angeles. 69 shooters from 41 nations competed.

== Results ==
Place	Shooter	Total	Silver Shoot Off
1	Matthew Dryke (USA)	198	
2	Ole Riber Rasmussen (DEN)	196	25
3	Luca Scribani Rossi (ITA)	196	23
4	John Pierik (NED)	194	
5	Anders Berglind (SWE)	194	
6	Norbert Hofmann (FRG)	194	
7	Jorge Molina (COL)	194	
8	Ian Hale (AUS)	193	
9	Nuria Ortiz (MEX)	193	
10	Eric Swinkels (NED)	193	
11T	Wallace Sykes (GBR)	193	
11T	Zhu Changfu (CHN)	193	
13T	Juan Ávalos (ESP)	192	
13T	Mikio Itakura (JPN)	192	
13T	Petros Kyritsis (CYP)	192	
13T	Housham Moustafa (EGY)	192	
13T	Firmo Roberti (ARG)	192	
13T	Nicky Szapáry (AUT)	192	
19T	Bror Nyström (FIN)	191	
19T	Francisco Pérez (ESP)	191	
19T	Francisco Romero Arribas (GUA)	191	
19T	Stéphane Tyssier (FRA)	191	
19T	Wu Lanying (CHN)	191	
24T	Paul Bentley (GBR)	190	
24T	Alec Crikis (AUS)	190	
26T	Martin Burkert (AUT)	189	
26T	Alfonso de Iruarrízaga (CHI)	189	
26T	John Woolley (NZL)	189	
29T	Celso Giardini (ITA)	188	
29T	Élie Pénot (FRA)	188	
29T	Wolfgang Trautwein (FRG)	188	
29T	Tsai Pai-sheng (TPE)	188	
33T	Christian Ek (SWE)	187	
33T	Lim Dong-ki (KOR)	187	
33T	Carlos Zarzar (CHI)	187	
36T	Kim Yeong-jin (KOR)	186	
36T	Juha Mäkelä (FIN)	186	
38T	Mohamed Ragheb (SYR)	185	
38T	Michael Thompson (USA)	185	
38T	Panagiotis Xanthakos (GRE)	185	
41T	Julio Jesús de las Casas (VEN)	184	
41T	Eigen Hayashi (JPN)	184	
41T	Albert Thompson (IRL)	184	
41T	Yang Ching-sung (TPE)	184	
45	Rodolfos Georgios Alexakos (GRE)	183	
46	Angel Guzman (MEX)	182	
47T	Daniel Belli (CAN)	181	
47T	Carlos Mazo (COL)	181	
49	Khayri Amar (JOR)	180	
50	Güneş Yunus (TUR)	179	
51T	Chow Tsun Man (HKG)	178	
51T	Eric Lombard (BEL)	178	
53T	Juan Jorge Giha Jr. (PER)	177	
53T	Mohamed Khorshed (EGY)	177	
55	Esteban Boza (PER)	176	
56	Luis Gamarra (BOL)	175	
57	Elias Harb (LIB)	174	
58T	Somchai Chanthavanij (THA)	172	
58T	Gebrael Haoui (LIB)	172	
58T	Mario-Oscar Zachrisson (GUA)	172	
61	Vicente Bergues (PAR)	168	
62T	Gary Berne (ISV)	167	
62T	Bob Warren-Codrington (ZIM)	167	
64T	Mauricio Kattan (BOL)	166	
64T	Harisimran Singh Sandhu (IND)	166	
66	Anthony Chuang (HKG)	149	
67	Ricardo Tellechea (PAR)	146	
68	Pichit Burapavong (THA)	142	
69	Mikhalakis Tymbios (CYP)	95	
