= Shooting at the 1988 Summer Olympics – Mixed skeet =

Sports shooting at the Olympics

Skeet at the Games of the XXIV Olympiad
- Date: 24 September 1988
- Competitors: 52 from 31 nations
- Winning score: 222 (OR)

Medalists
1st place, gold medalist(s)		Axel Wegner	East Germany
2nd place, silver medalist(s)		Alfonso de Iruarrizaga	Chile
3rd place, bronze medalist(s)		Jorge Guardiola	Spain

Skeet was one of the thirteen shooting events at the 1988 Summer Olympics. Open to both men and women, it was won by Axel Wegner.

== Qualification round ==
Rank	Athlete	Country	Score	Notes
1	Leoš Hlaváček	Czechoslovakia	149	Q
2	Daniel Carlisle	United States	149	Q
2	Alfonso de Iruarrizaga	Chile	149	Q
4	Valeri Timokhin	Soviet Union	149	Q
5	Svetlana Demina	Soviet Union	148	Q
6	Axel Wegner	East Germany	148	Q
7	Björn Thorwaldson	Sweden	147	Q
8	Jorge Guardiola	Spain	147	Q
9	Firmo Roberti	Argentina	147	Q
10	Matthew Dryke	United States	147	Q
11	Eric Swinkels	Netherlands	147	Q
12	Herbert Seeberger	West Germany	147	Q
13	Aleksandr Cherkasov	Soviet Union	147	Q
13	Luca Scribani Rossi	Italy	147	Q
15	Bernhard Hochwald	East Germany	147	Q
16	Zhang Weigang	China	146	Q
17	Mehmetbulent Torpil	Turkey	146	Q
18	Tamaz Imnaichvili	Soviet Union	146	DNF
19	Jürgen Raabe	East Germany	146	Q
20	Wu Lanying	China	146	Q
21	Hennie Dompeling	Netherlands	146	Q
22	Michael Tymvios	Cyprus	146	Q
23	Jacques Lanfranchi	France	145	Q (6th: 25)
24	Andrea Benelli	Italy	145	Q (6th: 24; 5th: 25)
25	Petr Málek	Czechoslovakia	145	Q (6th: 24; 5th: 25)
26	Richard Smith	United States	145	(6th: 24; 5th: 24)
27	Lubos Adamec	Czechoslovakia	144	
27	Juan Giha	Peru	144	
27	Ken Harman	Great Britain	144	
27	Don Kwasnycia	Canada	144	
27	Ole Riber Rasmussen	Denmark	144	
27	Wang Zhonghua	China	144	
33	Celso Giardini	Italy	143	
33	Josef Hahnenkamp	Austria	143	
33	Mohamed Khorshed	Egypt	143	
33	John Woolley	New Zealand	143	
33	Tomoya Yamashita	Japan	143	
38	Yasumasa Furo	Japan	142	
38	Jorge Molina	Colombia	142	
40	Michel Demoulin	Belgium	141	
40	Kim Ha-yeon	South Korea	141	
40	Nuria Ortíz	Mexico	141	
40	Wolfgang Trautwein	West Germany	141	
44	Ian Hale	Australia	140	
44	Karsten Krogner	Denmark	140	
44	Michaela Rink	West Germany	140	
44	Tsai Pai-sheng	Chinese Taipei	140	
44	Stephane Tyssier	France	140	
49	Terry Carlisle	United States	139	
50	Somchai Chanthavanich	Thailand	138	
51	John Farrell	New Zealand	137	
52	Jimmy Chin	Malaysia	136	

DNF Did not finish – Q Qualified for semifinal

== Semifinal ==
Rank	Athlete	Qual	1	2	Semifinal	Total	Notes
1	Axel Wegner (GDR)	148	25	25	50	198	Q EOR
2	Alfonso de Iruarrizaga (CHI)	149	24	25	49	198	Q EOR
3	Daniel Carlisle (USA)	149	24	24	48	197	Q
4	Zhang Weigang (CHN)	146	25	25	50	196	Q
5	Jürgen Raabe (GDR)	146	25	25	50	196	Q
6	Jorge Guardiola (ESP)	147	24	25	49	196	Q (6th: 25)
7	Luca Scribani Rossi (ITA)	147	24	25	49	196	(6th: 24)
8	Firmo Roberti (ARG)	147	25	24	49	196	
9	Eric Swinkels (NED)	147	25	24	49	196	
10	Herbert Seeberger (FRG)	147	25	24	49	196	
11	Bernhard Hochwald (GDR)	147	25	24	49	196	
11	Valeri Timokhin (URS)	149	23	24	47	196	
13	Svetlana Demina (URS)	148	23	24	47	195	
13	Hennie Dompeling (NED)	146	24	25	49	195	
13	Leoš Hlaváček (TCH)	149	21	25	46	195	
13	Aleksandr Cherkasov (URS)	147	25	23	48	195	
13	Björn Thorwaldson (SWE)	147	24	24	48	195	
13	Mehmetbulent Torpil (TUR)	146	25	24	49	195	
13	Wu Lanying (CHN)	146	25	24	49	195	
20	Andrea Benelli (ITA)	145	25	24	49	194	
20	Jacques Lanfranchi (FRA)	145	24	25	49	194	
20	Petr Málek (TCH)	145	25	24	49	194	
20	Michael Tymvios (CYP)	146	24	24	48	194	
24	Matthew Dryke (USA)	147	22	24	46	193	

EOR Equalled Olympic record – Q Qualified for final

== Final ==
Rank	Athlete	Qual+SF	Final	Total	Notes
1st place, gold medalist(s)	Axel Wegner (GDR)	198	24	222	OR
2nd place, silver medalist(s)	Alfonso de Iruarrizaga (CHI)	198	23	221	
3rd place, bronze medalist(s)	Jorge Guardiola (ESP)	196	24	220	
4	Daniel Carlisle (USA)	197	23	220	
5	Zhang Weigang (CHN)	196	23	219	
6	Jürgen Raabe (GDR)	196	23	219	

OR Olympic record

== Sources ==
- XXIVth Olympiad Seoul 1988 Official Report – Volume 2 Part 2 (PDF).
