= Shooting at the 1992 Summer Olympics – Mixed skeet =

Skeet at the Games of the XXV Olympiad
- Venue: Mollet del Vallès
- Competitors: 60 from 38 nations
- Winning score: 223 (OR)

Medalists
1st place, gold medalist(s)		Zhang Shan	China
2nd place, silver medalist(s)		Juan Giha	Peru
3rd place, bronze medalist(s)		Bruno Rossetti	Italy

Skeet was one of the thirteen shooting events at the 1992 Summer Olympics. It was the last Olympic skeet competition open to both men and women, and the only mixed shooting competition at the Olympics ever won by a woman: Zhang Shan. The competition consisted of a qualification round of 150 targets, a semifinal of 50 targets for the top 24 competitors, and a final of 25 targets for the top six. Hitting all 200 targets of the preliminary rounds, and 23 in the final, Zhang won ahead of four male shooters at 222. With José María Colorado eliminated due to lower final score, a three-way shoot-off between Juan Giha, Bruno Rossetti and Ioan Toman determined the silver and bronze medals, going to Giha and Rossetti respectively. The event was held on 28 July at the Mollet del Vallès Shooting Range.

== Qualification round ==
Rank	Athlete	Country	Score	Notes
1	Zhang Shan	China	150	Q
2	Matthew Dryke	United States	149	Q
3	José María Colorado	Spain	149	Q
4	Juan Giha	Peru	149	Q
5	Aleksandr Tcherkassov	Unified Team	148	Q
6	Firmo Roberti	Argentina	148	Q
7	James Graves	United States	148	Q
8	Bruno Rossetti	Italy	148	Q
9	Ioan Toman	Romania	148	Q
10	Boriss Timofejevs	Latvia	148	Q
11	Guillermo Torres	Cuba	148	Q
12	Luboš Adamec	Czechoslovakia	148	Q
13	Ole Justesen	Denmark	147	Q
14	David Valter	Czechoslovakia	147	Q
15	Luca Scribani Rossi	Italy	147	Q
16	Eric Swinkels	Netherlands	147	Q
17	Zhang Xindong	China	147	Q
18	Jorma Korhonen	Finland	147	Q
19	Bernhard Hochwald	Germany	147	Q
20	John Summers	Australia	146	Q
21	Jorge Guardiola	Spain	146	Q
22	Francisco Romero Arribas	Guatemala	146	Q
23	Andrew Austin	Great Britain	146	Q
24	Leoš Hlaváček	Czechoslovakia	146	Q
25	Andrea Benelli	Italy	145	
25	Dorota Chytrowska-Mika	Poland	145	
25	Connie Fluker	United States	145	
25	Andrei Inešin	Estonia	145	
25	Michael Maskell	Barbados	145	
25	Antonis Nikolaidis	Cyprus	145	
25	Valeri Timokhin	Unified Team	145	
25	Axel Wegner	Germany	145	
33	Josef Hahnenkamp	Austria	144	
33	Soichiro Ito	Japan	144	
33	Harald Jensen	Norway	144	
33	Farid Kharboutly	Syria	144	
33	Mohamed Khorshed	Egypt	144	
33	Pak Jong-ran	North Korea	144	
33	Peeter Päkk	Estonia	144	
33	Stéphane Tyssier	France	144	
33	Kaw Fun Ying	Malaysia	144	
42	Carlos Abarza	Chile	143	
42	Nayef Al-Daihani	Kuwait	143	
42	Claude Cuy y Mola	France	143	
42	Alfonso de Iruarrizaga	Chile	143	
42	Hennie Dompeling	Netherlands	143	
42	Luis Gamarra	Bolivia	143	
42	Diána Igaly	Hungary	143	
42	Wang Zhonghua	China	143	
50	Matthias Dunkel	Germany	141	
51	Alvaro Guardia	Costa Rica	140	
51	Khaled Sabet	Egypt	140	
51	Sin Nam-ho	North Korea	140	
51	Björn Thorwaldson	Sweden	140	
55	Servando Puldón	Cuba	140	
55	Ole Riber Rasmussen	Denmark	140	
57	Anton Manolov	Bulgaria	138	
58	Erzsébet Vasvári-Pongrátz	Hungary	137	
59	Diane Le Grelle	Great Britain	136	
60	Khaled Naghaway	Jordan	41	DNF

DNF Did not finish – Q Qualified for semifinal

== Semifinal ==
Rank	Athlete	Qual	Semifinal	Total	Notes
1	Zhang Shan (CHN)	150	50	200	Q OR
2	José María Colorado (ESP)	149	50	199	Q
3	Bruno Rossetti (ITA)	148	50	198	Q
4	Ioan Toman (ROU)	148	50	198	Q
5	Matthew Dryke (USA)	149	49	198	Q
6	Juan Giha (PER)	149	49	198	Q
7	Luca Scribani Rossi (ITA)	147	50	197	
8	Eric Swinkels (NED)	147	50	197	
9	Zhang Xindong (CHN)	147	50	197	
10	Firmo Roberti (ARG)	148	49	197	
11	Luboš Adamec (TCH)	148	49	197	
11	James Graves (USA)	148	49	197	
11	Aleksandr Tcherkassov (EUN)	148	49	197	
11	Boriss Timofejevs (LAT)	148	49	197	
11	Guillermo Torres (CUB)	148	49	197	
16	Jorge Guardiola (ESP)	146	50	196	
16	Leoš Hlaváček (TCH)	146	50	196	
16	Bernhard Hochwald (GER)	147	49	196	
16	Ole Justesen (DEN)	147	49	196	
16	Jorma Korhonen (FIN)	147	49	196	
21	Andrew Austin (GBR)	146	49	195	
21	John Summers (AUS)	146	49	195	
21	David Valter (TCH)	147	48	195	
24	Francisco Romero Arribas (GUA)	146	48	194	

OR Olympic record – Q Qualified for final

== Final ==
Rank	Athlete	Qual+SF	Final	Total	Silver shoot-off	Bronze shoot-off	Notes
1st place, gold medalist(s)	Zhang Shan (CHN)	200	23	223			OR
2nd place, silver medalist(s)	Juan Giha (PER)	198	24	222	3		
3rd place, bronze medalist(s)	Bruno Rossetti (ITA)	198	24	222	2	10	
4	Ioan Toman (ROU)	198	24	222	2	9	
5	José María Colorado (ESP)	199	23	222			
6	Matthew Dryke (USA)	198	23	221			

OR Olympic record

== Sources ==
- Games of the XXV Olympiad Barcelona 1992: The results (PDF).
