= Lanfranchi =

Lanfranchi is an Italian surname. Notable people with the surname include:

- Agostino Lanfranchi (1892–1963), Italian bobsledder and skeleton racer
- Andreas Lanfranchi (died 1659), Roman Catholic prelate, Bishop of Ugento
- Angela Lanfranchi (born 1950), American breast cancer surgeon
- Antonio Lanfranchi (1946–2015), Roman Catholic Archbishop
- Gaetano Lanfranchi (1901–1983), Italian bobsledder
- Giovanni Battista Lanfranchi (1606–1673), Roman Catholic prelate, Bishop of Avellino e Frigento
- Horace Lanfranchi (1935–2024), French teacher and politician
- Jacques Lanfranchi (1957–2011), French sport shooter
- Jean Lanfranchi (1923–2017), French footballer
- Jean-Paul Lanfranchi (born 1951), French lawyer and businessman
- Lanfranc of Milan (c. 1250–1306), variously called Guido Lanfranchi, Lanfranco or Alanfrancus, Italian surgeon
- Luigi Lanfranchi (1914–date of death unknown), Italian field hockey player
- Marcel Lanfranchi (1921–2013), French footballer
- Mario Lanfranchi (1927–2022), Italian film, theatre and television director
- Paolo Lanfranchi (born 1968), Italian cyclist
- Paolo Lanfranchi da Pistoia (fl. 1282–1295), Italian poet
- Pietro Lanfranchi (born 1978), Italian ski mountaineer
- Tony Lanfranchi (1935–2004), British racing driver
- Ubaldo Lanfranchi (died 1207), Italian Roman Catholic Archbishop
- Uberto Lanfranchi (died 1137), Italian Roman Catholic Archbishop and cardinal
- Vincenzo Lanfranchi (1609–1676), Roman Catholic prelate, Archbishop of Acerenza e Matera and Bishop of Trivento
