= Shooting at the 1996 Summer Olympics – Men's skeet =

Sports shooting at the Olympics

Men's skeet at the Games of the XXVI Olympiad
- Venue: Wolf Creek Shooting Complex
- Date: 26 July 1996
- Competitors: 54 from 34 nations
- Winning score: 149 (OR)

Medalists
1st place, gold medalist(s)		Ennio Falco	Italy
2nd place, silver medalist(s)		Mirosław Rzepkowski	Poland
3rd place, bronze medalist(s)		Andrea Benelli	Italy

Men's skeet was one of the fifteen shooting events at the 1996 Summer Olympics. Ennio Falco shot a perfect 125 in the qualification round and a 24 in the final, winning ahead of Mirosław Rzepkowski and Andrea Benelli, who won the bronze-medal shoot-off against Ole Riber Rasmussen.

== Qualification round ==
Rank	Athlete	Country	Day 1	Day 2	Total	Notes
1	Ennio Falco	Italy	75	50	125	Q OR
2	Andrea Benelli	Italy	74	49	123	Q
3	Mirosław Rzepkowski	Poland	75	48	123	Q
4	Ole Riber Rasmussen	Denmark	73	49	122	Q
5	Nikolai Tiopliy	Russia	73	49	122	Q
6	Boriss Timofejevs	Latvia	74	48	122	Q
7	Andrei Inešin	Estonia	73	48	121	
8	Juan Miguel Rodríguez	Cuba	72	49	121	
9	Antonakis Andreou	Cyprus	72	49	121	
9	Chen Dongjie	China	72	49	121	
9	Franck Durbesson	France	73	48	121	
9	Tamaz Imnaishvili	Georgia	72	49	121	
9	Bill Roy	United States	72	49	121	
9	Zhang Xindong	China	73	48	121	
15	Nasser Al Attiya	Qatar	71	49	120	
15	Hennie Dompeling	Netherlands	72	48	120	
15	James Graves	United States	73	47	120	
15	Soichiro Ito	Japan	72	48	120	
15	Jan Sychra	Czech Republic	72	48	120	
20	David Cunningham	Australia	73	46	119	
20	Bernhard Hochwald	Germany	72	47	119	
20	Craig Meuleman	Australia	69	50	119	
20	Clayton Miller	Canada	73	46	119	
20	Bruno Rossetti	Italy	71	48	119	
20	Guillermo Alfredo Torres	Cuba	71	48	119	
26	Jan-Henrik Heinrich	Germany	70	48	118	
26	Harald Jensen	Norway	72	46	118	
26	Antonis Nikolaidis	Cyprus	69	49	118	
26	George Quigley	United States	70	48	118	
26	Juan Carlos Romero	Guatemala	75	43	118	
26	Axel Wegner	Germany	71	47	118	
32	Saaid Al Motery	Saudi Arabia	69	48	117	
32	Bronislav Bechyňský	Czech Republic	69	48	117	
32	Leoš Hlaváček	Czech Republic	70	47	117	
32	Christos Kourtellas	Cyprus	69	48	117	
32	Eric Swinkels	Netherlands	71	46	117	
32	Ion Toman	Romania	71	46	117	
38	Esteban Boza	Peru	71	45	116	
38	Servando Puldón	Cuba	71	45	116	
38	Tadeusz Szamrej	Poland	70	46	116	
38	Valeri Timokhin	Azerbaijan	68	48	116	
42	Abdullah Al Rashidi	Kuwait	68	47	115	
42	Pascal Colomer	Chile	67	48	115	
42	Juan Giha	Peru	72	43	115	
45	Marcelo Gil	Argentina	65	48	113	
45	Mel Hains	South Africa	68	45	113	
45	Mohamed Khorshed	Egypt	67	46	113	
45	Francisco Romero Arribas	Guatemala	68	45	113	
49	Mohamed Al-Qasem	Jordan	70	42	112	
49	Prince Abdul Hakeem Jefri Bolkiah	Brunei	67	45	112	
49	Moustafa Hamdy	Egypt	66	46	112	
49	Michael Maskell	Barbados	67	45	112	
53	Jason Caswell	Canada	66	45	111	
54	Kaw Fun Ying	Malaysia	67	43	110	

OR Olympic record – Q Qualified for final

== Final ==
Rank	Athlete	Qual	Final	Total	Shoot-off	Notes
1st place, gold medalist(s)	Ennio Falco (ITA)	125	24	149		OR
2nd place, silver medalist(s)	Mirosław Rzepkowski (POL)	123	25	148		
3rd place, bronze medalist(s)	Andrea Benelli (ITA)	123	24	147	6	
4	Ole Riber Rasmussen (DEN)	122	25	147	5	
5	Nikolai Tiopliy (RUS)	122	24	146		
6	Boriss Timofejevs (LAT)	122	23	145		

OR Olympic record

== Sources ==
- Olympic Report Atlanta 1996 Volume III: The Competition Results (PDF).
