= Desmoulins (surname) =

Desmoulins, de Moulins, des Moulins or Demoulin are toponymic surnames literally meaning "from the mill" in French. It may have originated either as a nickname for someone who lived by the mill or as a toponymic surname for a person from one of the many places in France and Belgium named Moulins. Notable people with the surname include:

- Georges Demoulin (1919–1994), Belgian entomologist
- Michel Demoulin (born 1965), Belgian athlete
- Nicolas Démoulin (born 1972), French politician
- Robert Demoulin (1911–2008), Belgian academic
- Jacques Démoulin (1905–1991), French painter
- Jean de Moulins (d. 1353), French cardinal
- Roger de Moulins (d. 1187), Grand Master of the Knights Hospitaller
- André Desmoulins (1919–1970), French cyclist
- Camille Desmoulins (1760–1794), French revolutionary leader
  - Lucile Desmoulins née Duplessis (1770–1794), wife of Camille
- Charles Des Moulins (1798–1875), French naturalist
- Guyart des Moulins (1251–1322), French monk
