= Bror =

Bror is a Scandinavian masculine given name which simply means 'brother'. The name has been found as early as in runestones in the form Brodhir. The name form Bror is known since the year 1536. It is also used heavily in a colloquial sense in the city of Belfast.

Bror used to be a name that was never given to the oldest son of a family. From the 19th century, the literal meaning of the name has not been as important and the name could be given to any son. Bror was a very common name in Sweden during the first decades of the 20th century. It has since been less common. It is also in fairly common use in Denmark and Norway.

Name day: 5 October in Sweden, 9 January in Swedish speaking Finland, 20 May in Norway since 2014.

Notable people with the name include:

- Bror Andreasson (1887–1969), Swedish sports shooter
- Bror Beckman (1866–1929), Swedish composer
- Bror von Blixen-Finecke (1886–1946), Swedish baron
- Bror Blume (born 1992), Danish footballer
- Bror Brenner (1855–1923), Finnish sailor
- Bror Bügler (1908–1975), Swedish actor
- Bror Cederström (1780–1877), Swedish baron and lieutenant general
- Bror Oscar Eilert Ekwall (1877–1964), Philologist, etymologist & educator
- Bror Flygare (1888–1943), Swedish wrestler
- Bror Fock (1888–1964), Swedish long-distance runner
- Bror Friberg (1839–1878), New Zealand immigration agent
- Bror Geijer Göthe (1892–1949), Swedish artist
- Bror Hellström (1914–1992), Swedish runner
- Bror Emil Hildebrand (1806–1884), Swedish archaeologist
- Bror Hjorth (1894–1968), Swedish artist
- Bror Johansson (1921–2009), Finnish sailor
- Bror Ingemar Ture Johansson (1924–2009), Swedish racewalker
- Bror Kraemer (1900–1990), Finnish high jumper
- Bror Lagercrantz (1894–1981), Swedish fencer
- Bror Lillqvist (1918–1983), Finnish politician
- Bror Lindh (1877–1941), Swedish artist
- Bror Mannström (1884–1916), Swedish modern pentathlete
- Bror Mellberg (1923–2004), Swedish footballer
- Bror Meyer (1885–1956), Swedish figure skater
- Bror Modén, Swedish bandy player
- Bror Modigh (1891–1956), Swedish long-distance runner
- Bror Munck (1857–1935), Swedish Army officer
- Bror Julius Olsson Nordfeldt (1878–1955), American painter
- Bror Nyström (born 1953), Finnish sports shooter
- Bror Österdahl (1900–1973), Swedish sprinter
- Bror Östman (1928–1992), Swedish ski jumper
- Bror Hannes Päivänsalo (1875–1933), Finnish Lutheran pastor and politician
- Bror Pettersson (1924–1978), Swedish ice hockey player
- Bror Yngve Rahm (born 1955), Norwegian politician
- Bror Rexed (1914–2002), Swedish neuroscientist
- Bror Yngve Sjöstedt (1866–1948), Swedish naturalist
- Bror Yngve Rahm (born 1955), Norwegian politician
- Bror Rexed (1914–2002), Swedish neuroscientist
- Bror Yngve Sjöstedt (1866–1948), Swedish naturalist
- Bror Axel Söderlundh (1912–1957), Swedish composer and conductor
- Bror Stefenson (1929–2018), Swedish Navy officer
- Bror Fredrik Svensson (1964–2008), Swedish jazz pianist
- Bror Thure Thulstrup (1848–1930), American illustrator
- Bror Ludvig Ulrich (1818–1887), Swedish naval officer and civil servant
- Bror Utter (1913–1993), American artist
- Bror Vingren (1906–1980), Swedish wrestler
- Bror Wiberg (1890-1935), Finnish footballer
- Bror Anders Wikström (1854–1909), Swedish–American artist
- Bror With (1900–1985), Norwegian engineer and businessman
- Bror van der Zijde (born 1989), Dutch bobsledder
