= Berglind =

Berglind may refer to:

- Berglind (given name), an Icelandic feminine given name
- Berglind (surname), a Swedish surname
