= David Valter =

Czech sport shooter (born 1970)

David Valter (born 7 January 1970 in Přílepy) is a Czech sport shooter. He competed at the 1992 Summer Olympics in the mixed skeet event, in which he tied for 21st place.
