= Van Woerkom =

Van Woerkom, Vanwoerkom, or van Woerkom may refer to one of the following people:

- Gerald Van Woerkom, American state legislator
- Joop van Woerkom, Dutch Olympian
- Theo Van Woerkom, New Zealand cricketer
