= Ton Buunk =

Dutch water polo player (born 1952)

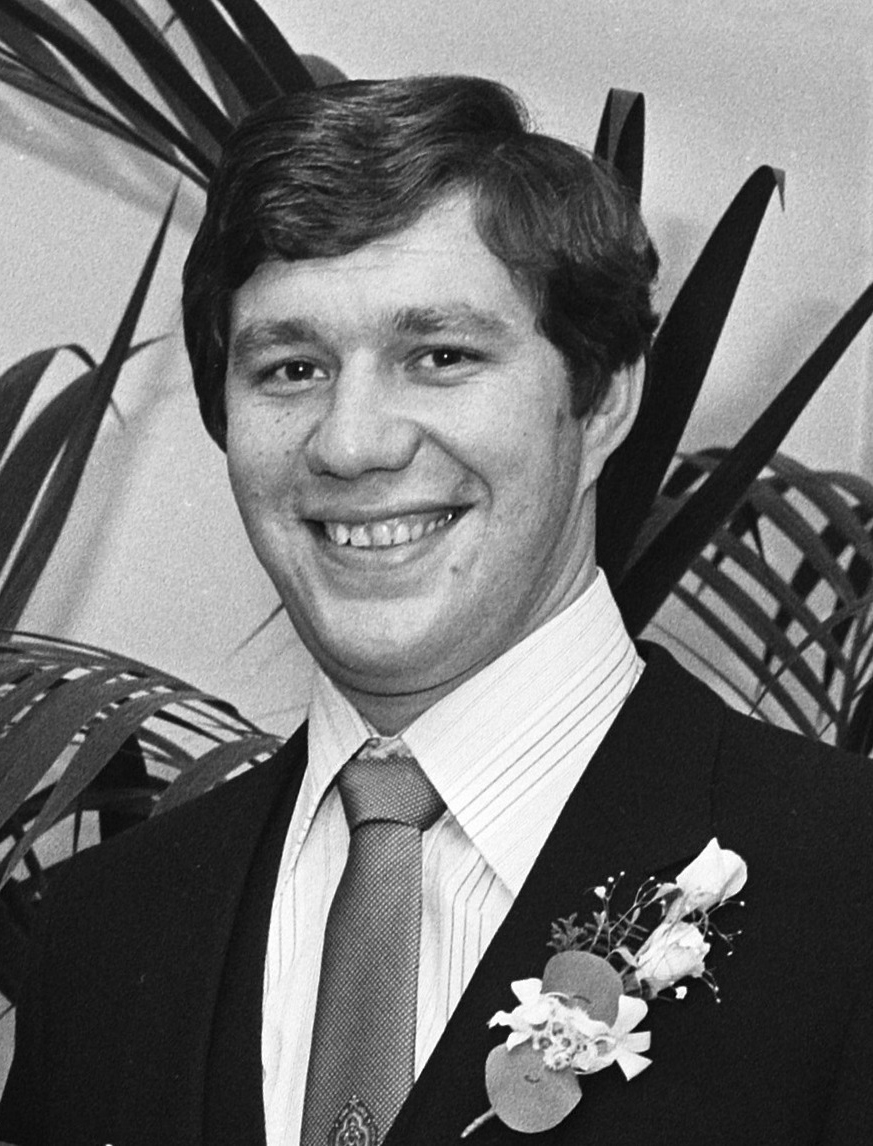
- Buunk in 1979

Personal information
- Born: 18 September 1952 (age 73) Amsterdam, the Netherlands
- Height: 196 cm (6 ft 5 in)
- Weight: 91 kg (201 lb)

Sport
- Sport: Water polo
- Club: De Meeuwen, Amsterdam
Medal record
Men's water polo
Representing the Netherlands
Olympic Games
Bronze medal – third place	1976 Montreal	Team

Anton "Ton" Gerrit Jan Buunk (born 18 September 1952) is a retired Dutch water polo player. He competed in the 1972, 1976, 1980 and 1984 Olympics and won a bronze medal in 1976, placing sixth-seventh on other occasions. He was given the honour to carry the national flag of the Netherlands at the opening ceremony of the 1984 Summer Olympics in Los Angeles, becoming the 15th water polo player to be a flag bearer at the opening and closing ceremonies of the Olympics. On 14 December 1979 he married Vera Renema.

== See also ==
- Netherlands men's Olympic water polo team records and statistics
- List of Olympic medalists in water polo (men)
- List of players who have appeared in multiple men's Olympic water polo tournaments
- List of flag bearers for the Netherlands at the Olympics

Olympic Games
Preceded by André Bolhuis	Flagbearer for Netherlands; Los Angeles 1984	Succeeded by Eric Swinkels
