= Vașvari =

Vașvari is a surname. Notable people with the surname include:

- Erzsébet Vasvári-Pongrátz (1954–2022), Hungarian sports shooter
- Gabriel Vașvari (born 1986), Romanian footballer
