= Seeberger =

Seeberger is a surname. Notable people with the surname include:

- Charles Seeberger (1857–1931), American inventor
- Herbert Seeberger (born 1949), German sport shooter
- Jürgen Seeberger (born 1965), German football manager
- Matt Seeberger (born 1984), American tennis player
- Peter Seeberger (born 1966), German chemist
