= Soichiro Ito =

Soichiro Ito may refer to:

- Soichiro Ito (sport shooter)
- Soichiro Ito (politician)
