= Andrei Inešin =

Estonian sports shooter

Andrei Inešin (born 18 January 1967) is an Estonian sport shooter who competed in the 1992 Summer Olympics, in the 1996 Summer Olympics, in the 2000 Summer Olympics, in the 2004 Summer Olympics, and in the 2008 Summer Olympics. He won a gold medal at the 2006 ISSF World Shooting Championships.

Inešin was born in Tallinn. He began training in 1981 at the Rocca al Mare shooting range under the guidance of Vladimir Bobrov. Later, his coaches were Dimitri Mälson (1999–2001) and Mati Mark (2001–2008). He became a member of the Estonian National Team in 1993.

== Olympic results ==
Event	1992	1996	2000	2004	2008
Skeet	T-25th	Not held			
Skeet (men)	Not held	7th	T-19th	T-21st	18th
