= Kyritsis =

Kyritsis is a surname. Notable people with the surname include:

- Alexis Kyritsis (born 1982), Greek basketball player
- Ilias Kyritsis (born 1997), Greek footballer
- Kyriakos Kyritsis, Greek lawyer and politician
- Michalis Kyritsis (born 1945), Greek basketball player and coach
- Pambis Kyritsis (born 1958), Cypriot trade unionist and politician
- Petros Kyritsis (born 1953), Cypriot sports shooter
