= George Quigley =

George Quigley may refer to:

- George Quigley (sport shooter), American sport shooter
- George P. Quigley, film director and producer
