= Přílepy =

Přílepy may refer to places in the Czech Republic:

- Přílepy (Kroměříž District), a municipality and village in the Zlín Region
- Přílepy (Rakovník District), a municipality and village in the Central Bohemian Region
- Velké Přílepy, a municipality and village in the Central Bohemian Region
