= Chile at the 1996 Summer Olympics =

- IOC code: CHI
- NOC: Chilean Olympic Committee
- Website: www.coch.cl (in Spanish)

in Atlanta
- Competitors: 21 (16 men and 5 women) in 10 sports
- Flag bearer: Sebastián Keitel
- Medals: Gold 0 Silver 0 Bronze 0 Total 0

Summer Olympics appearances (overview)
- 1896; 1900–1908; 1912; 1920; 1924; 1928; 1932; 1936; 1948; 1952; 1956; 1960; 1964; 1968; 1972; 1976; 1980; 1984; 1988; 1992; 1996; 2000; 2004; 2008; 2012; 2016; 2020; 2024

Chile competed at the 1996 Summer Olympics in Atlanta, United States. 21 competitors, 16 men and 5 women, took part in 18 events in 10 sports.

== Competitors ==
The following is the list of number of competitors in the Games.

Sport	Men	Women	Total
Athletics	3	1	4
Boxing	1	–	1
Cycling	5	0	5
Fencing	1	0	1
Sailing	1	0	1
Shooting	1	0	1
Swimming	1	0	1
Table tennis	2	2	4
Tennis	0	2	2
Weightlifting	1	–	1
Total	16	5	21

== Athletics ==
Men
Track and road events

Athlete	Event	Heats		Quarterfinal		Semifinal		Final	
Athlete	Event	Result	Rank	Result	Rank	Result	Rank	Result	Rank
Sebastián Keitel	200 metres	20.96	47	Did not advance					
Marcelo Barrientos	Marathon	—N/a						2:31:05	86

Field events

Athlete	Event	Qualification		Final	
Athlete	Event	Distance	Position	Distance	Position
Gert Weil	Shot put	18.67	22	Did not advance	

Women
Track and road events

Athlete	Event	Heats		Quarterfinal		Semifinal		Final	
Athlete	Event	Result	Rank	Result	Rank	Result	Rank	Result	Rank
Érika Olivera	Marathon	—N/a						2:39:06	37

== Boxing ==
Athlete	Event	Round of 32	Round of 16	Quarterfinals	Semifinals	Final	
Athlete	Event	Opposition Result	Opposition Result	Opposition Result	Opposition Result	Opposition Result	Rank
Ricardo Araneda	Middleweight	Kakauridze (GEO); L 3–10	Did not advance				

== Cycling ==
=== Road ===
Men

Athlete	Event	Time	Rank
Víctor Garrido	Road race	DNF	

=== Track ===
Pursuit

Athlete	Event	Qualification		Quarterfinals	Semifinals	Final	
Athlete	Event	Time	Rank	Opposition Time	Opposition Time	Opposition Time	Rank
José Medina; Luis Fernando Sepúlveda; Marco Arriagada; Marcelo Arriagada	Men's team pursuit	4:25.960	16	Did not advance			

== Fencing ==
Men

Athlete	Event	Round of 64	Round of 32	Round of 16	Quarterfinals	Semifinals	Final	
Athlete	Event	Opposition Result	Opposition Result	Opposition Result	Opposition Result	Opposition Result	Opposition Result	Rank
Paris Inostroza	Épée	Imre (HUN); L 12–15	Did not advance					

== Sailing ==
Open
Fleet racing

Athlete	Event	Race											Net points	Final rank
Athlete	Event	1	2	3	4	5	6	7	8	9	10	11	Net points	Final rank
Luis Echenique	Laser	20	~~57~~	~~31~~	15	18	16	9	26	31	15	8	158	19

== Shooting ==
Men

Athlete	Event	Qualification		Final	
Athlete	Event	Points	Rank	Points	Rank
Pascal Colomer	Skeet	115	42	Did not advance	

== Swimming ==
Men

Athlete	Event	Heats		Final A/B	
Athlete	Event	Time	Rank	Time	Rank
Nicolás Rajcevich	100 metre backstroke	59.90	44	Did not advance	
Nicolás Rajcevich	200 metre backstroke	2:05.79	27	Did not advance	

== Table tennis ==
Men

Athlete	Event	Group Stage				Round of 16	Quarterfinal	Semifinal	Final	
Athlete	Event	Opposition Result	Opposition Result	Opposition Result	Rank	Opposition Result	Opposition Result	Opposition Result	Opposition Result	Rank
Augusto Morales	Singles	Gatien (FRA); L 0–2	Korbel (CZE); L 0–2	Choi (PRK); L 0–2	4	Did not advance				
Augusto Morales; Juan Salamanca	Doubles	Waldner / Persson (SWE); L 0–2	Heister / Keen (NED); L 0–2	Yuzawa / Tasaki (JPN); L 0–2	4	—N/a	Did not advance			

Women

Athlete	Event	Group Stage				Round of 16	Quarterfinal	Semifinal	Final	
Athlete	Event	Opposition Result	Opposition Result	Opposition Result	Rank	Opposition Result	Opposition Result	Opposition Result	Opposition Result	Rank
Berta Rodríguez	Singles	Liu (CHN); L 0–2	Feng (USA); L 0–2	Popovová (SVK); L 0–2	4	Did not advance				
Berta Rodríguez; Sofija Tepes	Doubles	Liu / Qiao (CHN); L 0–2	Schöpp / Nemes (GER); L 0–2	Holt / Lomas (GBR); L 0–2	4	—N/a	Did not advance			

== Tennis ==
Women

Athlete	Event	Round of 32	Round of 16	Quarterfinals	Semifinals	Final	
Athlete	Event	Opposition Result	Opposition Result	Opposition Result	Opposition Result	Opposition Result	Rank
Paula Cabezas; Bárbara Castro	Doubles	Csurgó / Temesvári (HUN); L 4–6, 6–1, 3–6	Did not advance				

== Weightlifting ==
Athlete	Event	Snatch		Clean & jerk		Total	Rank
Athlete	Event	Result	Rank	Result	Rank	Total	Rank
Cristián Escalante	–99 kg	142.5	23	172.5	22	315.0	22

== See also ==
- Chile at the 1995 Pan American Games
