= Brorsson =

Brorsson is a Swedish patronymic surname meaning "son of Bror". Notable people with the surname include:

- Arvid Brorsson (born 1999), Swedish footballer
- Franz Brorsson (born 1996), Swedish footballer
- Mona Brorsson (born 1990), Swedish biathlete
