= Kim Ha-yeon =

Kim Ha-yeon may refer to:

- Kim Ha-yeon (sport shooter)
- Kim Ha-yeon (actress)
