= Leen Hoogendijk =

Dutch water polo player (1890–1969)

Personal information
- Full name: Leendert Proos Hoogendijk
- Nationality: Netherlands
- Born: 2 July 1890 Rotterdam, the Netherlands
- Died: 14 August 1969 (aged 79) Vlaardingen, the Netherlands

Sport
- Sport: Water polo

Senior clubs
- Years: Team
- –: De Maas
- –: Rotterdam
National team
- Years: Team
- ?-?: Netherlands

Leendert Proos "Leen" Hoogendijk (2 July 1890 – 14 August 1969) was a Dutch male water polo player. He was a member of the Netherlands men's national water polo team. He competed with the team at the 1920 Summer Olympics.

== See also ==
- Netherlands men's Olympic water polo team records and statistics
- List of men's Olympic water polo tournament goalkeepers
