= Gary Berne =

US Virgin Islands sports shooter (1944–2021)

Personal information
- Nationality: American Virgin Islander
- Born: January 14, 1944
- Died: May 15, 2021 (aged 77)

Sport
- Sport: Sports shooting

Gary Berne (January 14, 1944 – May 15, 2021) was a sports shooter who represented the United States Virgin Islands. He competed in the mixed skeet event at the 1984 Summer Olympics.
