= Mikio Itakura =

Japanese sports shooter (born 1941)

Personal information
- Nationality: Japanese
- Born: 19 November 1941 (age 83)

Sport
- Sport: Sports shooting

Mikio Itakura (板倉 幹夫, Itakura Mikio; born 19 November 1941) is a Japanese sports shooter. He competed in the mixed skeet event at the 1984 Summer Olympics.
