= Jason Caswell =

Canadian sport shooter (born 1974)

Personal information
- Born: 7 June 1974 (age 52) Winnipeg, Canada

Sport
- Sport: Sport shooting
Medal record
Representing Canada
Commonwealth Games
Silver medal – second place	2010 Delhi	Skeet
Pan American Games
Silver medal – second place	1995 Mar del Plata	Skeet

Jason Caswell (born June 7, 1974) is a Canadian sport shooter. He competed at the 1996 and 2000 Summer Olympics. In 1996, he placed 53rd in the men's skeet event. In 2000, he tied for 19th place in the men's skeet event.
