= Berglind (surname) =

Berglind is a Swedish surname. As of 2013, there are 1,426 people with this surname in Sweden.

== Notable people ==
Notable people who have the surname Berglind include:

- Anders Berglind (born 1958), Swedish sports shooter
- Jeanette Berglind (1816–1903), Swedish sign language teacher
- Mats Berglind (1952–2016), Swedish politician
- Sarah Berglind (born 1996), Swedish ice hockey player
- Victor Berglind (born 1992), Swedish ice hockey player

== See also ==
- Berglind (given name), an Icelandic feminine given name
