= Mirosław Rzepkowski =

Polish sport shooter

Mirosław Tadeusz Rzepkowski (born 19 June 1959) is a Polish sport shooter. He was born in Wrocław. He won a silver medal in skeet at the 1996 Summer Olympics in Atlanta.

== Olympic results ==
Event	1996
Skeet	(silver) Silver; 123+25
