= Jean-François Dellac =

French sports shooter

Jean-François Dellac (born May 1, 1961 in Toulouse) is a French sport shooter. He competed at the 2000 Summer Olympics in the men's skeet event, in which he tied for 35th place.
