= Jeon Chan-sik =

South Korean sports shooter

Jeon Chan-sik (born 14 February 1971) is a South Korean sport shooter who competed in the 2000 Summer Olympics. He tied for 23rd place in the men's skeet event.
