= Herman Veenstra =

Dutch water polo player (1911–2004)

Personal information
- Born: 11 October 1911; Poerworedjo, Dutch East Indies
- Died: 23 April 2004 (aged 92); Diemen, Netherlands

Sport
- Country: Netherlands
- Sport: Water polo

Herman Alex Veenstra (11 October 1911 in Poerworedjo, Dutch East Indies – 23 April 2004 in Diemen) was a Dutch water polo player who competed in the 1936 Summer Olympics. He was part of the Dutch team which finished fifth in the 1936 tournament. He played five matches as goalkeeper.

== See also ==
- Netherlands men's Olympic water polo team records and statistics
- List of men's Olympic water polo tournament goalkeepers
