= Martin Burkert (sport shooter) =

Austrian sports shooter (born 1957)

Personal information
- Nationality: Austrian
- Born: 13 March 1957 (age 68)

Sport
- Sport: Sports shooting

Martin Burkert (born 13 March 1957) is an Austrian sports shooter. He competed in the mixed skeet event at the 1984 Summer Olympics.
