= Angel Guzman (sport shooter) =

Mexican sports shooter

Personal information
- Nationality: Mexican
- Born: 20 April 1953 (age 71)

Sport
- Sport: Sports shooting

Angel Guzman (born 20 April 1953) is a Mexican sports shooter. He competed in the mixed skeet event at the 1984 Summer Olympics.
