= Norbert Hofmann (sport shooter) =

German sports shooter

Personal information
- Nationality: German
- Born: 3 June 1963 (age 61); Worms, Germany

Sport
- Sport: Sports shooting

Norbert Hofmann (born 3 June 1963) is a German former sports shooter. He competed in the mixed skeet event at the 1984 Summer Olympics.
