= Fred van Dorp =

Dutch water polo player (1938–2023)

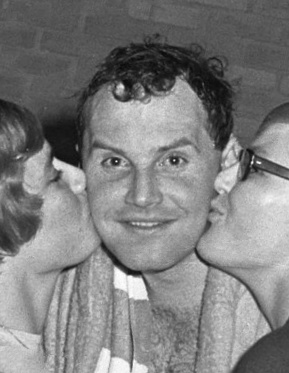
- Fred van Dorp in 1966

Personal information
- Birth name: Alfred Carel van Dorp
- Nationality: Dutch
- Born: 13 October 1938; Batavia, Dutch East Indies
- Died: 9 November 2023 (aged 85)
- Height: 1.90 m (6 ft 3 in)
- Weight: 95 kg (209 lb)

Sport
- Sport: Water polo
- Club: AZ&PC, Amersfoort

Alfred Carel van Dorp (13 October 1938 – 9 November 2023) was a Dutch water polo player who participated in three Summer Olympics with the Dutch Men's National Team. He was given the honour to carry the national flag of the Netherlands at the opening and closing ceremonies of the 1968 Summer Olympics in Mexico City, becoming the eleventh water polo player to be a flag bearer at the opening and closing ceremonies of the Olympics. After retiring he worked for many years as a water polo referee.

His elder brother, Tony van Dorp, was also a water polo player, who participated in the 1964 and 1968 Olympics for the United States, and played against his brother.

Van Dorp died on 9 November 2023, at the age of 85.

== International senior tournaments ==
- 1960 – Summer Olympics (Rome, 8th position)
- 1964 – Summer Olympics (Tokyo, 8th position)
- 1968 – Summer Olympics (Mexico City, 7th position)

== See also ==
- Netherlands men's Olympic water polo team records and statistics
- List of flag bearers for the Netherlands at the Olympics

Olympic Games
Preceded by Anton Geesink	Flagbearer for Netherlands; Mexico City 1968	Succeeded by Nico Spits
