= Eigen Hayashi =

Japanese sports shooter

Personal information
- Nationality: Japanese
- Born: 15 March 1949 (age 76)

Sport
- Sport: Sports shooting

Eigen Hayashi (林 英源, Hayashi Eigen, born 15 March 1949) is a Japanese sports shooter. He competed in the mixed skeet event at the 1984 Summer Olympics.
