= Francisco Romero Arribas =

Guatemalan sport shooter

Personal information
- Born: December 24, 1959 (age 66)

Sport
- Sport: Sport shooting
Medal record
Representing Guatemala
Pan American Games
Bronze medal – third place	1995 Mar del Plata	Skeet team
Central American and Caribbean Games
Silver medal – second place	1990 Mexico City	Skeet team
Silver medal – second place	1998 Maracaibo	Skeet team
Silver medal – second place	2002 San Salvador	Skeet team
Bronze medal – third place	1982 Havana	Skeet team
Bronze medal – third place	1986 Santiago	Skeet team
Bronze medal – third place	1993 Ponce	Skeet team
Bronze medal – third place	2002 San Salvador	Skeet

Francisco Romero Arribas (born December 24, 1959) is a Guatemalan sport shooter. He competed in skeet shooting events at the Summer Olympics in 1976, 1980, 1984, 1992, and 1996. His five Olympic appearances are the most of any Guatemalan sportsperson. His father, Francisco Romero Portilla, and his brother, Juan Carlos Romero were also Olympic sport shooters for Guatemala.

== Olympic results ==
Event	1976	1980	1984	1992	1996
Skeet (mixed)	T-56th	T-26th	T-19th	24th	Not held
Skeet (men)	Not held				T-45th
