= Christian Ek =

Swedish sports shooter

Personal information
- Nationality: Swedish
- Born: 5 February 1959 (age 66); Uppsala, Sweden

Sport
- Sport: Sports shooting

Christian Ek (born 5 February 1959) is a Swedish sports shooter. He competed in the mixed skeet event at the 1984 Summer Olympics.
