= Mohamed Ragheb =

Syrian sports shooter

Mohamed Khaldoun Ragheb
Personal information
- Nationality: Syrian
- Born: 26 February 1943 (age 82)

Sport
- Sport: Sports shooting

Mohamed Khaldoun Ragheb (Arabic: محمد خلدون راغب; born 26 February 1943) is a Syrian sports shooter. He competed in the Mixed skeet event at the 1984 Summer Olympics in Los Angeles, United States. During his training period for the 1984 Summer Olympics, his son, Maher Ragheb, would accompany him to training everyday. Maher would end up winning multiple shooting competitions in the United Arab Emirates.
