= Abraham van Olst =

Dutch water polo player (1897–1964)

Personal information
- Born: September 24, 1897; Amsterdam, Netherlands
- Died: April 9, 1964 (aged 66); Amsterdam, Netherlands

Sport
- Sport: Water polo

Abraham van Olst (24 September 1897, Amsterdam – 9 April 1964, Amsterdam) was a Dutch water polo player who competed in the 1928 Summer Olympics. He was part of the Dutch team in the 1928 tournament. He played both matches as goalkeeper.

== See also ==
- Netherlands men's Olympic water polo team records and statistics
- List of men's Olympic water polo tournament goalkeepers
