= Björn Thorwaldson =

Swedish sports shooter

Björn Thorwaldson (born 8 October 1955 in Hölö) is a Swedish sport shooter. He competed at the Summer Olympics in 1988 and 1992. In 1988, he tied for 13th place in the mixed skeet event, and in 1992, he tied for 51st place in the mixed skeet event.
