= Jorge Guardiola =

Spanish sport shooter

Medal record

Men's shooting

Representing Spain

Olympic Games
Bronze medal – third place	1988 Seoul	Skeet

Jorge Guardiola (born 1963) is a Spanish sport shooter and Olympic medalist. He received a bronze medal in skeet shooting at the 1988 Summer Olympics in Seoul.

Olympic results
Event	1988	1992
Skeet	(bronze) Bronze; 147+49+24	16th 146+50
