= Mehmetbulent Torpil =

Turkish sports shooter

Mehmetbulent Torpil (June 17, 1965 – April 8, 2016) was a Turkish sport shooter. He competed at the 1988 Summer Olympics in the mixed skeet event, in which he tied for 13th place.

Torpil was youth world champion in 1984 and the runner-up at the world championships in 1993. He holds several national records. After his death, a national trap shooting competition, organized by the Turkish Shooting and Hunting Federation, was named in his honor.
