= Boriss Timofejevs =

Latvian sports shooter (born 1957)

Boriss Timofejevs (born November 4, 1957) is a Latvian sport shooter. He competed in the 1992, 1996, and 2000 Summer Olympics. At the 1992 Olympics, he tied for 11th place in the skeet event. At the 1996 Olympics, he placed 6th in the men's skeet event. At the 2000 Olympics, he tied for 12th place in the men's skeet event. He was born in Riga.
