= Elias Harb =

Lebanese sports shooter (born 1939)

Personal information
- Nationality: Lebanese
- Born: 20 March 1939 (age 86)

Sport
- Sport: Sports shooting

Elias Harb (born 20 March 1939) is a Lebanese sports shooter. He competed in the mixed skeet event at the 1984 Summer Olympics.
