= Yang Ching-sung =

Taiwanese sports shooter

Personal information
- Nationality: Taiwanese
- Born: 5 June 1942 (age 82)

Sport
- Sport: Sports shooting

Yang Ching-sung (born 5 June 1942) is a Taiwanese sports shooter. He competed in the mixed skeet event at the 1984 Summer Olympics.
