= Gijs van Beek =

Dutch sports shooter

Personal information
- Nationality: Dutch
- Born: 21 July 1971 (age 53); Rhenen, Netherlands

Sport
- Sport: Shooting

Gijs van Beek (born 21 July 1971 in Rhenen) is a Dutch sport shooter. He competed at the 2000 Summer Olympics in the men's skeet event, in which he tied for 12th place.
