= Michaela Rink =

German sports shooter

Personal information
- Nationality: German
- Born: 21 March 1967 (age 58); Wiesbaden, Germany

Sport
- Sport: Sports shooting

Michaela Rink (born 21 March 1967) is a German sports shooter. She competed in the mixed skeet event at the 1988 Summer Olympics.
