= Housham Moustafa =

Egyptian sports shooter

Personal information
- Nationality: Egyptian
- Born: 18 September 1955 (age 69)

Sport
- Sport: Sports shooting

Housham Moustafa (born 18 September 1955) is an Egyptian sports shooter. He competed in the mixed skeet event at the 1984 Summer Olympics.
