= Timo Laitinen =

Finnish sports shooter

Timo Laitinen (born September 3, 1972, in Juuka) is a Finnish sport shooter. He competed at the 2000 Summer Olympics in the men's skeet event, in which he tied for 23rd place.
