= Richard Smith (sport shooter) =

American sports shooter

Personal information
- Nationality: American
- Born: September 20, 1950 (age 75)

Sport
- Sport: Sports shooting

Richard Smith (born September 20, 1950) is an American sports shooter. Smith competed in the mixed skeet event at the 1988 Summer Olympics.
