= Mauricio Kattan =

Bolivian sports shooter

Personal information
- Nationality: Bolivian
- Born: 25 October 1942
- Died: 26 August 2020 (aged 77)

Sport
- Sport: Sports shooting

Mauricio Kattan (25 October 1942 – 26 August 2020) was a Bolivian sports shooter. He competed in the mixed skeet event at the 1984 Summer Olympics.
