= Michael Thompson (sport shooter) =

American sports shooter (born 1956)

Personal information
- Nationality: American
- Born: June 28, 1956 (age 70) Hampton, Virginia, U.S.

Sport
- Sport: Sports shooting

Michael Thompson (born June 28, 1956) is an American sports shooter. He competed in the mixed skeet event at the 1984 Summer Olympics.
