= Karel Struijs =

Dutch water polo player (1892–1974)

Personal information
- Nationality: Netherlands
- Born: 11 September 1892 Amsterdam, the Netherlands
- Died: 30 March 1974 (aged 81) Naarden, the Netherlands

Sport
- Sport: Water polo

Senior clubs
- Years: Team
- –: Het Y
- –: Amsterdam
National team
- Years: Team
- –: Netherlands

Karel Struijs (11 September 1892 – 30 March 1974) was a Dutch male former water polo player. He was a member of the Netherlands men's national water polo team. He competed with the team at the 1920 Summer Olympics and 1924 Summer Olympics.

== See also ==
- Netherlands men's Olympic water polo team records and statistics
- List of men's Olympic water polo tournament goalkeepers
