= Juha Mäkelä =

Finnish sports shooter

Personal information
- Nationality: Finnish
- Born: 14 March 1956 (age 69); Tampere, Finland

Sport
- Sport: Sports shooting

Juha Mäkelä (born 14 March 1956) is a Finnish sports shooter. He competed in the mixed skeet event at the 1984 Summer Olympics.
