= Marcelo Gil =

Argentine sports shooter (born 1965)

Personal information
- Nationality: Argentine
- Born: 25 May 1965 (age 59)

Sport
- Sport: Sports shooting

Marcelo Gil (born 25 May 1965) is an Argentine sports shooter. He competed in the men's skeet event at the 1996 Summer Olympics.
