= Aleksandr Cherkasov =

Soviet sports shooter

Aleksandr Cherkasov (born February 5, 1956) is a former Soviet sport shooter. He competed in skeet shooting events at the Summer Olympics in 1976, 1988, and 1992.

== Olympic results ==
Event	1976	1988	1992
Skeet (mixed)	T-14th	T-13th	T-11th
