= Franck Durbesson =

French sport shooter

Franck Durbesson (born August 17, 1964, in Bondy) is a French sport shooter. He competed for France in the 1996 and 2000 Summer Olympics; he tied for seventh place in the men's skeet event in 1996 and tied for ninth place in the men's skeet event in 2000.
