= Roberto Carlo Mendoza =

Puerto Rican sport shooter (born 1956)

Roberto Carlo Mendoza (born May 15, 1956) is a Puerto Rican sport shooter. He competed at the 2000 Summer Olympics in the men's skeet event, in which he tied for 32nd place.
