= Matthias Dunkel =

German sports shooter

Personal information
- Nationality: German
- Born: 6 May 1961 (age 63); Bad Schlema, East Germany

Sport
- Sport: Sports shooting

Matthias Dunkel (born 6 May 1961) is a German sports shooter. He competed in the mixed skeet event at the 1992 Summer Olympics.
