= Zhang Shan =

Chinese sport shooter

Personal information
- Born: March 23, 1968 (age 58) Nanchong, Sichuan, China
Medal record
Women's shooting
Representing China
Olympic Games
Gold medal – first place	1992 Barcelona	Skeet
World Championships
Gold medal – first place	2007 Nicosia	Skeet Team
Asian Games
Gold medal – first place	1990 Beijing	Skeet
Gold medal – first place	1990 Beijing	Skeet Team
Gold medal – first place	2010 Guangzhou	Skeet Team
Asian Championships
Gold medal – first place	2012 Doha	Skeet
Gold medal – first place	2012 Doha	Skeet team
Silver medal – second place	2007 Kuwait City	Skeet team
Asian Shotgun Championships
Gold medal – first place	2009 Almaty	Skeet
Gold medal – first place	2009 Almaty	Skeet team

Zhang Shan (simplified Chinese: 张山; traditional Chinese: 張山; pinyin: Zhāng Shān; born March 23, 1968) is a Chinese sports shooter and Olympic champion.

== Career ==
Zhang Shan was born in the city of Nanchong in Sichuan province in Southwest China. She began shooting skeet at age 16. In 1989, she joined the Chinese national skeet team. She won the gold medal in the Olympic Skeet Shooting event at the 1992 Summer Olympics in Barcelona. This event had been mixed, open to both men and women, since it was introduced to the Olympics in 1968. Shan's 1992 gold was the first medal won by a woman in this mixed event. However, 1992 was the last time women competed against men in this category, as they were barred from the 1996 Olympics—a decision made in April 1992, prior to the games where Zhang won her gold medal. For the 2000 Sydney games, the International Olympic Committee allowed women again, but only in segregated competition. Zhang participated in the 2000 Olympic women's skeet placing 8th. She had won the title at the 7th National Game in 1993 and the 10th National Game in 2005.

She won a gold medal with the Chinese team in the women's skeet (team event) at the 2007 World Shotgun Championships in Nicosia. She took part in the 2010 ISSF World Shooting Championships in Munich, where she placed 15th in individual skeet. Her later achievements includes a silver medal in 2017 at the 13th Chinese National Games, at the age of 49, 25 years after her Olympic gold medal.

== Olympic results ==
Event	1992	1996	2000
Skeet (mixed)	(gold) Gold; 150+50+23	Not held	
Skeet (women)	Not held		8th 69

== Records ==
Current world records held in Skeet
Women	Teams	214	China (Wei, Yu, Zhang)	September 5, 2007	Nicosia (CYP)
