= John Davison (sport shooter) =

British sport shooter

John Davison (born 14 February 1966 in London) is a British sport shooter. He competed at the 2000 Summer Olympics in the men's skeet event, in which he tied for 19th place. He graduated from University of Cambridge and Harvard Business School.
