= Vicente Bergues =

Paraguayan sports shooter (born 1939)

Personal information
- Nationality: Paraguayan
- Born: 19 July 1939 (age 86)

Sport
- Sport: Sports shooting

Vicente Osvaldo Bergues Larreinegabe (born 19 July 1939) is a Paraguayan sports shooter. He competed in the mixed skeet event at the 1984 Summer Olympics.

He later became a businessman and served as Corporación Mercantil's president.
