= Shooting at the 2000 Summer Olympics – Men's skeet =

Men's skeet at the Games of the XXVII Olympiad
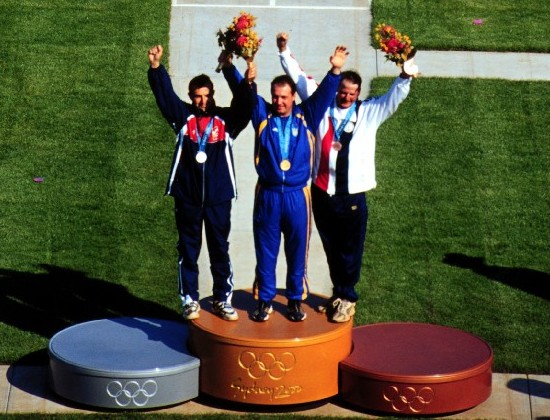
- Venue: Sydney International Shooting Centre
- Date: 22 September 2000; 23 September 2000
- Competitors: 49 from 36 nations
- Winning score: 150 (=WR)

Medalists
| 1st place, gold medalist(s) | | Mykola Milchev | Ukraine |
| 2nd place, silver medalist(s) | | Petr Málek | Czech Republic |
| 3rd place, bronze medalist(s) | | James Graves | United States |

The men's skeet shooting competition at the 2000 Summer Olympics was the last shooting event of the Sydney Games, held on 22 and 23 September. Mykola Milchev of Ukraine became the first shooter to hit all 150 targets at an Olympic competition in skeet.

== Records ==
Prior to this competition, the existing world and Olympic records were as follows.

Qualification records
| World record | Jan-Henrik Heinrich (GER) | 125 | Lonato, Italy | 5 June 1996 |
| Olympic record | Ennio Falco (ITA) | 125 | Atlanta, United States | 27 July 1996 |

Final records
| World record | Jan-Henrik Heinrich (GER) | 150 (125+25) | Lonato, Italy | 5 June 1996 |
| Olympic record | Ennio Falco (ITA) | 149 | Atlanta, United States | 27 July 1996 |

== Qualification round ==
The qualification round comprised 75 targets on day 1, and 50 targets on day 2.

| Rank | Athlete | Country | Day 1 | Day 2 | Total | Shoot-off | Notes |
|---|---|---|---|---|---|---|---|
| 1 | Mykola Milchev | Ukraine | 75 | 50 | 125 | | Q EWR EOR |
| 2 | Petr Málek | Czech Republic | 75 | 49 | 124 | | Q |
| 3 | James Graves | United States | 73 | 50 | 123 | | Q |
| 4 | Hennie Dompeling | Netherlands | 72 | 50 | 122 | 10 | Q |
| 5 | Andrea Benelli | Italy | 72 | 50 | 122 | 10 | Q |
| 6 | Nasser Al-Attiyah | Qatar | 74 | 48 | 122 | 9 | Q |
| 7 | Sergey Yakshin | Kazakhstan | 73 | 49 | 122 | 8 | |
| 8 | Antonakis Andreou | Cyprus | 72 | 50 | 122 | 7 | |
| 9 | Saeed Al Maktoum | United Arab Emirates | 74 | 48 | 122 | 3 | |
| 9 | Franck Durbesson | France | 72 | 50 | 122 | 3 | |
| 9 | Marcelo Yarad | Chile | 73 | 49 | 122 | 3 | |
| 12 | Boriss Timofejevs | Latvia | 74 | 48 | 122 | 1 | |
| 12 | Gijs van Beek | Netherlands | 75 | 47 | 122 | 1 | |
| 14 | Abdullah Al Rashidi | Kuwait | 73 | 48 | 121 | | |
| 14 | Clive Barton | Australia | 71 | 50 | 121 | | |
| 14 | Ennio Falco | Italy | 72 | 49 | 121 | | |
| 14 | Andrzej Głyda | Poland | 72 | 49 | 121 | | |
| 14 | Jan-Henrik Heinrich | Germany | 71 | 50 | 121 | | |
| 19 | Jason Caswell | Canada | 73 | 47 | 120 | | |
| 19 | John Davison | Great Britain | 72 | 48 | 120 | | |
| 19 | Andrei Inešin | Estonia | 72 | 48 | 120 | | |
| 19 | Geoffrey Jukes | New Zealand | 71 | 49 | 120 | | |
| 23 | Georgios Achilleos | Cyprus | 71 | 48 | 119 | | |
| 23 | Saeed Al-Mutairi | Saudi Arabia | 73 | 46 | 119 | | |
| 23 | Khurram Inam | Pakistan | 72 | 47 | 119 | | |
| 23 | Harald Jensen | Norway | 72 | 47 | 119 | | |
| 23 | Jeon Chan-sik | South Korea | 74 | 45 | 119 | | |
| 23 | Mohamed Khorshed | Egypt | 73 | 46 | 119 | | |
| 23 | Timo Laitinen | Finland | 71 | 48 | 119 | | |
| 23 | Michael Maskell | Barbados | 71 | 48 | 119 | | |
| 23 | Nikolai Teplyi | Russia | 70 | 49 | 119 | | |
| 32 | Bronislav Bechynsky | Czech Republic | 71 | 47 | 118 | | |
| 32 | Roberto Carlo Mendoza | Puerto Rico | 70 | 48 | 118 | | |
| 32 | Mostafa Hamdy | Egypt | 70 | 48 | 118 | | |
| 35 | Jean-François Dellac | France | 69 | 48 | 117 | | |
| 35 | Saud Habib | Kuwait | 70 | 47 | 117 | | |
| 35 | Juan Romero Arribas | Guatemala | 70 | 47 | 117 | | |
| 35 | Michael Schmidt, Jr. | United States | 72 | 45 | 117 | | |
| 39 | David Cunningham | Australia | 68 | 48 | 116 | | |
| 39 | Pietro Genga | Italy | 70 | 46 | 116 | | |
| 39 | Drew Harvey | Great Britain | 68 | 48 | 116 | | |
| 39 | Juan Miguel Rodríguez | Cuba | 71 | 45 | 116 | | |
| 43 | Tomas Johansson | Sweden | 72 | 43 | 115 | | |
| 43 | Guillermo Alfredo Torres | Cuba | 70 | 45 | 115 | | |
| 45 | Prince Abdul Hakeem Jefri Bolkiah | Brunei | 69 | 45 | 114 | | |
| 46 | Jin Di | China | 69 | 44 | 113 | | |
| 47 | Alfred Karl Alfredsson | Iceland | 66 | 45 | 111 | | |
| 47 | Brian Thomson | New Zealand | 66 | 45 | 111 | | |
| 49 | Juan Giha | Peru | 67 | 43 | 110 | | |

EOR Equalled Olympic record – EWR Equalled World record – Q Qualified for final

== Final ==
| Rank | Athlete | Qual | Final | Total | Shoot-off | Notes |
|---|---|---|---|---|---|---|
| 1st place, gold medalist(s) | Mykola Milchev (UKR) | 125 | 25 | 150 | | EWR OR |
| 2nd place, silver medalist(s) | Petr Málek (CZE) | 124 | 24 | 148 | | |
| 3rd place, bronze medalist(s) | James Graves (USA) | 123 | 24 | 147 | | |
| 4 | Hennie Dompeling (NED) | 122 | 24 | 146 | 4 | |
| 5 | Andrea Benelli (ITA) | 122 | 24 | 146 | 3 | |
| 6 | Nasser Al-Attiyah (QAT) | 122 | 23 | 145 | | |

EWR Equalled World record – OR Olympic record

== Sources ==
- Official Report of the XXVII Olympiad — Shooting (PDF).
