= Mel Hains =

South African sports shooter

Personal information
- Nationality: South African
- Born: 3 March 1951 (age 74); Pretoria, South Africa

Sport
- Sport: Sports shooting

Mel Hains (born 3 March 1951) is a South African sports shooter. He competed in the men's skeet event at the 1996 Summer Olympics.
