= Jürgen Raabe =

German sport shooter

Jürgen Raabe (born September 26, 1957, in Suhl) is a German sport shooter. He competed at the 1988 Summer Olympics in the mixed skeet event, in which he placed sixth.
