= Ioan Toman =

Romanian sports shooter

Personal information
- Nationality: Romania
- Born: 6 March 1959 (age 67) Teş, Romania
- Height: 1.79 m (5 ft 10 1/2 in)
- Weight: 87 kg (192 lb)

Sport
- Sport: Shooting
- Event: Skeet
- Club: CSA Steaua Bucuresti
Medal record
Men's shooting
Representing Romania
World Championships
Silver medal – second place	2007 Nicosia	Skeet (SK125)

Ioan Toman (born March 6, 1959, in Teş) is a Romanian skeet shooter. He competed in the mixed skeet shooting at the 1980 Summer Olympics in Moscow, and at the 1992 Summer Olympics in Barcelona, and men's skeet at the 1996 Summer Olympics in Atlanta. Twelve years after competing in his last Olympics, Toman qualified for his fourth Romanian team as a 49-year-old at the 2008 Summer Olympics in Beijing, by winning the silver medal from the 2007 World Shotgun Championships in Nicosia, Cyprus. He placed thirty-fifth out of forty-one shooters in the two-day qualifying rounds of men's skeet, with a total hit of 108 targets.

== Olympic results ==
Olympic results
Event	1980	1992	1996	2008
Skeet	19th 192	4th 148+50+24	32nd 117	35th 108
