= Tomas Johansson (sport shooter) =

Swedish sports shooter

Tomas Johansson (born May 29, 1974 in Uppsala) is a Swedish sport shooter. He competed at the 2000 Summer Olympics in the men's skeet event, in which he tied for 43rd place.
