= Carlos Abarza =

Chilean sport shooter (born 1969)

Personal information
- Full name: Carlos Arturo Abarza Chavez
- Nationality: Chilean
- Born: 15 November 1969 (age 55)

Sport
- Sport: Shooting
- Event: Skeet

Carlos Arturo Abarza Chávez (born 15 November 1969) is a Chilean sport shooter. He competed in the skeet event at the 1992 Summer Olympics.
