= Evert Kroon =

Dutch water polo player (1946–2018)

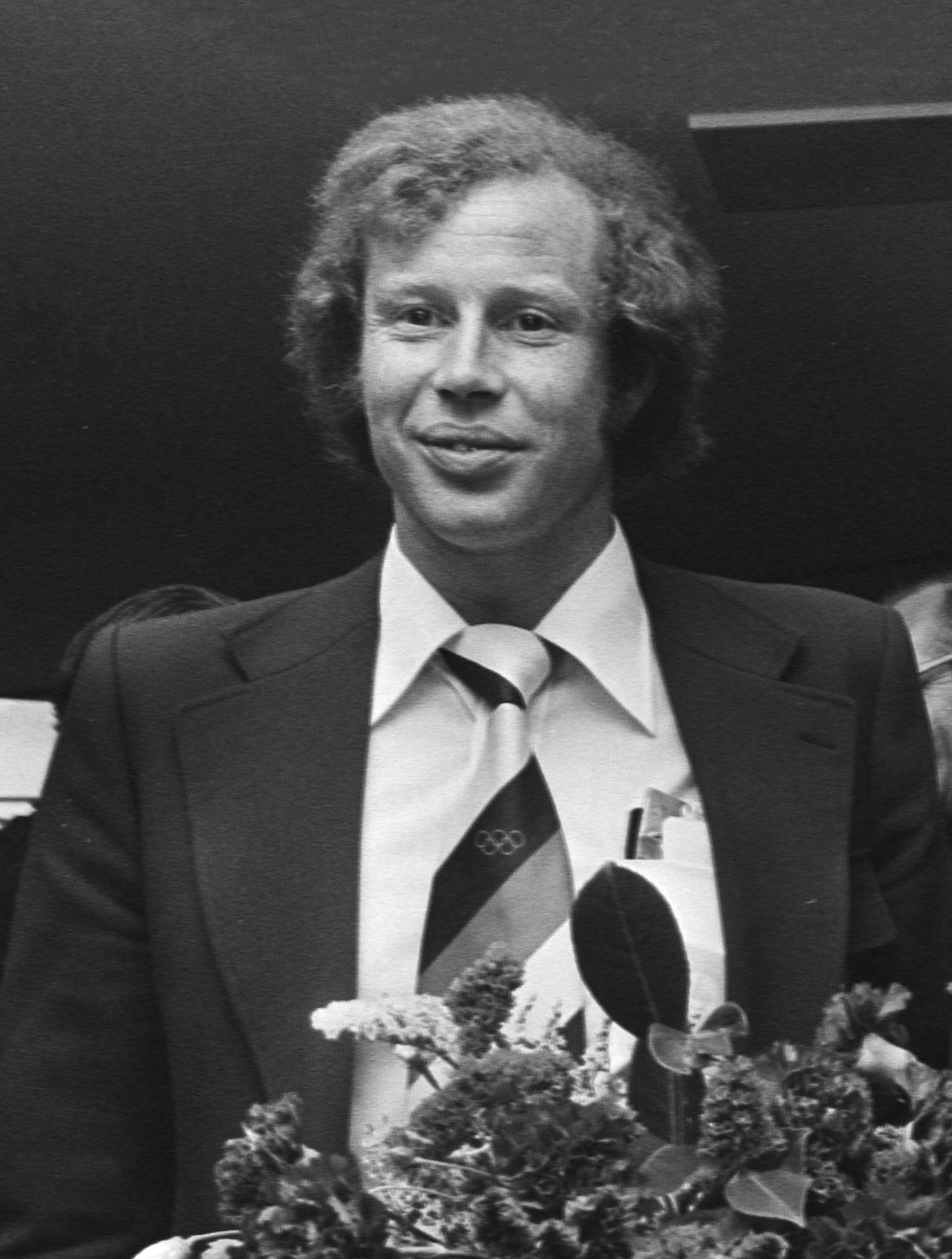
- Kroon in 1976

Personal information
- Born: September 9, 1946 Hilversum, North Holland, Netherlands
- Died: April 2, 2018 (aged 71) Hollandsche Rading, Netherlands

Sport
- Sport: Water polo
Medal record
Representing Netherlands
Olympic Games
Bronze medal – third place	1976 Montreal	Team competition

Evert Gerrit Kroon (9 September 1946 – 2 April 2018) was a water polo goalkeeper from The Netherlands, who participated in three consecutive Summer Olympics, starting in 1968. After two seventh-place finishes Kroon won the bronze medal with the Dutch Men's Water Polo Team at the 1976 Summer Olympics in Montreal, Quebec, Canada. He was given the honour to carry the national flag of the Netherlands at the closing ceremony of the 1976 Summer Olympics in Montreal, becoming the thirteenth water polo player to be a flag bearer at the opening and closing ceremonies of the Olympics.

== See also ==
- Netherlands men's Olympic water polo team records and statistics
- List of Olympic medalists in water polo (men)
- List of men's Olympic water polo tournament goalkeepers
