= Carlos Mazo =

Colombian sports shooter

Personal information
- Nationality: Colombian
- Born: 10 March 1957 (age 68)

Sport
- Sport: Sports shooting

Carlos Mazo (born 10 March 1957) is a Colombian sports shooter. He competed in the mixed skeet event at the 1984 Summer Olympics.
