= Juan Giha =

Peruvian sport shooter (born 1955)

Personal information
- Full name: Juan Jorge Giha Yarur
- Born: 23 April 1955 (age 71) Santiago, Chile
Medal record
Men's shooting
Representing Peru
Olympic Games
Silver medal – second place	1992 Barcelona	Skeet

Juan Jorge Giha Yarur (born 23 April 1955) is a Chilean-born Peruvian sports shooter and Olympic medalist. A six-time Olympian, he won a silver medal in Skeet Shooting at the 1992 Summer Olympics in Barcelona, second after gold-winner Zhang Shan.

== Biography ==
Born in Santiago, Chile, he is the son of Juan Giha Ali and Nelly Yarur, and brother of José Luis, Nicolas, Nelly Cecilia and Nathalie. He went to Inmaculado Corazon School up to third grade and then attended Santa Maria High School where he finished his studies. He then attended the Universidad de Lima where he obtained a bachelor's degree in Industrial Engineering. In 1982, he married Joyce Abusada. In 1989, they had a son who they named Juan Ricardo. In the years to come, he would prepare himself for his conquest in 1992, where he obtained the silver medal in the Barcelona, Spain 1992 Olympic Games.

Further in his career, after 27 consecutive national championships wins, in 1997, he accomplished a record-winning achievement. During the second half of the year, he would win several shooting events. Starting with the Bolivarian Games in Arequipa, Peru with Skeet record, one week after wins South American competition in Santiago Chile named Eulogio Pasten Leiva. He achieved one of His most coveted trophies, Bronze medal in world Championship held in Lima Peru on end of October 1997, after breath taking shootoff that lasted thirty minutes, against Tamaz Imainsvilli from Georgia and Joe Buffa from USA . In this competition, renowned shooters like Al-Rashidi from Kuwait and Ennio Falco from Italy would attain the first and second places.

== Olympic results ==
Event	1988	1992	1996	2000
Skeet (mixed)	27th 144	(silver) Silver; 149+49+24	Not held	
Skeet (men)	Not held		42nd 115	49th 110
