= Wouly de Bie =

Dutch water polo player (1958–2023)

Personal information
- Born: March 4, 1958; Beverwijk, Netherlands
- Died: August 31, 2023 (aged 65)

Sport
- Sport: Water polo

Wouly Sybrand de Bie (4 March 1958 – 31 August 2023) was a water polo goalkeeper from the Netherlands, who participated in two Summer Olympics. In 1980 he finished in sixth position with the Dutch team. Four years later in Los Angeles, de Bie once again gained the sixth spot in the final rankings with the Netherlands. De Bie was reckoned one of the best goalkeepers of the world in 1982, when he finished first during the Tungsram Cup in Budapest, Hungary, where the top ten teams of the world were present. Directly after that tournament he gained the fourth spot during the World Championships in Guayaquil, Ecuador.

De Bie had over 30 years of experience as an international coach with Dutch, Kuwait, French and Venezuelan club teams, as well as national squads in Kuwait (men), New Zealand (men and women), Canada (women). Since, 2009 he was the National Technical Director and the National Head Coach of Qatar men's Water polo team.

He died on 31 August 2023, at the age of 65.

== See also ==
- Netherlands men's Olympic water polo team records and statistics
- List of men's Olympic water polo tournament goalkeepers
