= Tadeusz Szamrej =

Polish sports shooter

Personal information
- Nationality: Polish
- Born: 17 October 1956 (age 68); Kraków, Poland

Sport
- Sport: Sports shooting

Tadeusz Szamrej (born 17 October 1956) is a Polish sports shooter. He competed in the men's skeet event at the 1996 Summer Olympics.
