= Max van Gelder =

Dutch water polo player (1924–2019)

Personal information
- Born: 20 October 1924 Jakarta, Indonesia
- Died: 7 December 2019 (aged 95)

Sport
- Sport: Water polo
- Club: HZ ZIAN, The Hague
Medal record
Representing the Netherlands
European Championships
Gold medal – first place	1950 Vienna	Team

Marcus "Max" van Gelder (20 October 1924 – 7 December 2019) was a Dutch water polo player who won a European title in 1950 and placed fifth at the 1952 Olympics.

== See also ==
- Netherlands men's Olympic water polo team records and statistics
- List of men's Olympic water polo tournament goalkeepers
