= Eric Lombard =

Belgian sports shooter

Personal information
- Nationality: Belgian
- Born: 14 April 1965 (age 59); Brussels, Belgium

Sport
- Sport: Sports shooting

Eric Lombard (born 14 April 1965) is a Belgian sports shooter. He competed in the mixed skeet event at the 1984 Summer Olympics.
