= José María Colorado =

Spanish sports shooter

José María Colorado (born 22 January 1956 in Puerto Real) is a Spanish sport shooter. He competed at the 1992 Summer Olympics in the mixed skeet event, in which he placed fifth.
