= John Summers (sport shooter) =

Australian sport shooter (born 1957)

John Summers (born 16 December 1957 in Melbourne) is an Australian sport shooter. He competed at the 1992 Summer Olympics in the mixed skeet event, in which he tied for 21st place.
