= Francisco Romero Portilla =

Guatemalan sports shooter

Personal information
- Nationality: Guatemalan
- Born: 27 May 1931

Sport
- Sport: Sports shooting

Francisco Romero Portilla (27 May 1931 – 13 August 2022) was a Guatemalan former sports shooter. He competed in the mixed trap event at the 1980 Summer Olympics. He was 49 years old at the time, making him the oldest Olympian to represent Guatemala. His son Francisco Romero Arribas was also an Olympic sport shooter.
