= Mikhalakis Tymbios =

Cypriot sport shooter (born 1948)

Mikhalakis Tymbios (December 15, 1948 – June 2019) was a Cypriot sport shooter. He competed at the Summer Olympics in 1984 and 1988. In 1984, he placed 69th in the mixed skeet event, and in 1988, he tied for 20th place in the mixed skeet event.

Known by the nickname Mike (Μάικ), he was a national shooting champion and was later a member of the board of directors for the Cyprus Sports Organization. He died in June 2019 and the provincial shooting championships were later named in his honor.
