= Bob Warren-Codrington =

Zimbabwean sports shooter (born 1950)

Personal information
- Nationality: Zimbabwean
- Born: 3 January 1950 (age 75); Harare, Rhodesia

Sport
- Sport: Sports shooting

Bob Warren-Codrington (born 3 January 1950) is a Zimbabwean sports shooter. He competed in the mixed skeet event at the 1984 Summer Olympics.
