= Harisimran Singh Sandhu =

Indian sports shooter (born 1950)

Personal information
- Nationality: Indian
- Born: 4 January 1950 (age 75)

Sport
- Sport: Sports shooting

Harisimran Singh Sandhu (born 4 January 1950) is an Indian sports shooter. He competed in the mixed skeet event at the 1984 Summer Olympics.
