= Alfonso de Iruarrizaga =

Chilean sport shooter (born 1957)

Medal record

Men's shooting

Representing Chile

Olympic Games
Silver medal – second place	1988 Seoul	Skeet

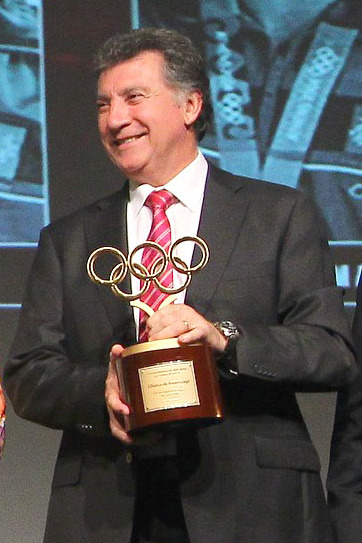
Alfonso de Iruarrizaga Portrait

Alfonso de Iruarrizaga (born 22 August 1957) is a Chilean sport shooter and Olympic medalist. He received a silver medal in skeet shooting at the 1988 Summer Olympics in Seoul. Iruarrizaga was the only medalist for Chile at the 1988 Summer Olympics.

Olympic results
Event	1988	1992
Skeet	(silver) Silver; 149+49+23	42nd 143
