= Herbert Seeberger =

German sports shooter

Herbert Seeberger (born 14 July 1949 in Erlangen) is a German sport shooter. He competed at the 1988 Summer Olympics in the mixed skeet event, in which he placed tenth.
