= Erzsébet Vasvári-Pongrátz =

Hungarian sports shooter (1954–2022)

Erzsébet Vasvári
Personal information
- Full name: Erzsébet Vasvári-Pongrátz
- Nicknames: Erzsike, Erzsi néni
- Nationality: Hungarian
- Born: 28 June 1954 Budapest, Hungary
- Died: November 2022 (aged 68) Budapest
- Occupation: Mester trainer

Sport
- Sport: Sports shooting
- Rank: Mester, Olimpikon
- Club: Vasvári Koronglövő Akadémia SE
- Coached by: Pál Vasvári

Achievements and titles
- Olympic finals: 1 silver 2 bronz
- Commonwealth finals: 1 silver
- Personal best: Skeet 200/198 (Magyar női rekord)

Erzsébet Vasvári-Pongrátz (28 June 1954 – November 2022) was a Hungarian sports shooter. She competed in the mixed skeet event at the 1992 Summer Olympics.

== Career ==
Listed in Olympians Who Won a Medal at the World Shooting Championships (2–2–5 1989 Montecatini Terme bronze: skeet and skeet team (competed as Erzsébet Vasvári); 1990 Moskva gold: skeet team, silver: skeet (competed as Erzsébet Vasvári); 1991 Perth bronze: skeet and skeet team (competed as Erzsébet Vasvári); 1994 Fagnano Olona gold: skeet team (competed as Erzsébet Vasvári); 1995 Lefkosia silver: skeet team (competed as Erzsébet Vasvári); 2002 Lahti bronze: skeet team (competed as Erzsébet Vasvári).
