= George Quigley (sport shooter) =

American sports shooter

Personal information
- Born: February 1, 1968 (age 58) Cincinnati, Ohio, United States

Sport
- Sport: Sports shooting

George Quigley (born February 1, 1968) is an American sports shooter. He competed in the men's skeet event at the 1996 Summer Olympics.
