= Mati Mark =

Estonian sport shooter and sport personnel

Mati Mark (9 March 1941 Pärnu – 21 September 2008 Tallinn) was an Estonian sport shooter and sport personnel.

In 1978 he graduated from Tallinn Pedagogical Institute in physical education.

1961-1969, he won several gold medals at national championships.

1996-1998 he was the head of Estonian Culture Ministry's sport department.

From 1990 to 1994 and from 1996 to 2000, he was the president of the Estonian Shooting Sport Federation. From 2005 to 2008, he was the vice-president of the European Shooting Confederation. From 1992-2001 he was a member of the Estonian Olympic Committee.
