= Anders Berglind =

Swedish sports shooter (born 1958)

Personal information
- Nationality: Swedish
- Born: 28 October 1958 (age 66); Forshaga, Sweden

Sport
- Sport: Sports shooting

Anders Berglind (born 28 October 1958) is a Swedish sports shooter. He competed in the mixed skeet event at the 1984 Summer Olympics.
