= Petros Kyritsis =

Cypriot sports shooter (born 1953)

Personal information
- Nationality: Cypriot
- Born: 15 October 1953 (age 71)

Sport
- Sport: Sports shooting

Petros Kyritsis (born 15 October 1953) is a Cypriot sports shooter. He competed in the mixed skeet event at the 1984 Summer Olympics.
