= Joop van Woerkom =

Dutch water polo player (1912–1998)

Personal information
- Born: 3 May 1912; Schiedam, Netherlands
- Died: 27 January 1998 (aged 85); Schiedam, Netherlands

Sport
- Sport: Water polo

Johannes Jacobus "Joop" van Woerkom (3 May 1912 – 27 January 1998) was a Dutch water polo player who competed in the 1936 Summer Olympics. He was part of the Dutch team which finished fifth in the 1936 tournament. He played two matches as goalkeeper.

== See also ==
- Netherlands men's Olympic water polo team records and statistics
- List of men's Olympic water polo tournament goalkeepers
