= Michel Demoulin =

Belgian sports shooter

Personal information
- Nationality: Belgian
- Born: 19 June 1965 (age 59); Uccle, Belgium

Sport
- Sport: Sports shooting

Michel Demoulin (born 19 June 1965) is a Belgian sports shooter. He competed in the mixed skeet event at the 1988 Summer Olympics.
