= Bror Nyström =

Finnish sports shooter

Personal information
- Nationality: Finnish
- Born: 2 April 1953 (age 71); Pargas, Finland

Sport
- Sport: Sports shooting

Bror Nyström (born 2 April 1953) is a Finnish sports shooter. He competed in the mixed skeet event at the 1984 Summer Olympics.
