= Jean-Paul Lanfranchi =

French lawyer and businessman (born 1951)

- Born: 14 July 1951 (age 74)
- Education: I.H.E.I.
- Occupations: Chairman and CEO of BIH Eastern
- Website: BIH Eastern

Jean Paul Lanfranchi (born 14 July 1951) is a French lawyer and businessman.

== Career ==
Lanfranchi became an attorney in 1977 in Kinshasa, Democratic Republic of Congo. He was the first French lawyer practicing in Kinshasa and served as an advisor to the French Embassy in the Democratic Republic of Congo until 1980.

Lanfranchi was a personal advisor to President Mobutu Sese Seko from 1980 until the president's death. Additionally, he served as a consultant for major French corporations operating in Africa, including Accor, Dumez, Castel Frères, EMS, Northern France, and Air France – UTA. He organized the privatization of the sugar sector in Côte d'Ivoire, Gabon, and the Central African Republic. Lanfranchi also assisted Omar Bongo, the second president of Gabon, in restructuring several state enterprises.

He managed the rescue of the Sugar Company of Upper Ogoouénotemment (SOSUHO) in Franceville, capital of the Haut-Ogooué province. He worked closely with Patrice Otha, the President of the Gabon Initiative Industries Transparency Initiative (EITI) and Chief of Staff for President Ali Bongo since January 2010.

Lanfranchi serves as an advisor to Pierre Castel, the President of Castel Group. He is responsible for restructuring the company's brewery and bottling operations in Africa and Eastern Europe. He successfully regained ownership of several breweries in Eastern Europe for Castel Group. In January 2006, Lanfranchi founded BIH Eastern, a company that encompasses all of Castel Group's brewery and bottling activities in Georgia, Azerbaijan, Armenia, Uzbekistan, and Kurdistan.

He became chairman, CEO, and shareholder in partnership with Citi Venture Capital International (CVCI), the emerging markets private equity arm of Citigroup.

His engagements include:

– Symposium of the French Senate in the Caucasus

– Participation in the first Eurasia Forum

– Seminar organized by the French Agency for International Business Development (Ubifrance) in Central Asia

– Symposium organized by the French-Georgian Chamber of Commerce and Industry in Tbilisi
