= Berglind (given name) =

Berglind is an Icelandic female given name. It started to be used in the 1930s and 1940s.

== Notable people ==
Notable people with this given name include:

- Berglind Ásgeirsdóttir (born 1955), Icelandic ambassador to Russia
- Ása Berglind Hjálmarsdóttir (born 1984), Icelandic politician

== See also ==
- Berglind (surname), a Swedish surname
