= Jacques Lanfranchi =

French sports shooter

Jacques Lanfranchi (27 December 1957 – 23 November 2011) was a French sport shooter. He competed at the 1988 Summer Olympics in the mixed skeet event, in which he tied for 20th place. He was born in Ouagadougou.
