= Pascal Colomer =

Chilean sports shooter

Personal information
- Nationality: Chilean
- Born: 30 August 1974 (age 50)

Sport
- Sport: Sports shooting

Pascal Colomer (born 30 August 1974) is a Chilean sports shooter. He competed in the men's skeet event at the 1996 Summer Olympics.
