= Georges Demoulin =

Georges Demoulin (11 March 1919 – 27 July 1994) was a Belgian entomologist. He specialised in the Ephemeroptera.

== His life ==
A short necrology has been published by Jacques Rigout.

He was born at Amay, He is attracted by the forms and the colors of insects, he abandons his studies of pharmacy to be engaged at the age of 28 as naturalist trainee to the Royal museum of natural History of Belgium.

After a stay of one year in Africa in the National park of Garamba, he returns to the museum where he is in charge of the collections of insects with aquatic habits.

== Works ==
His publications are numerous, among these we can note:

- 1952. Contribution à l'étude des Ephoronidae Euthyplociinae, 1952, Bulletin de l'Institut royal des Sciences naturelles de Belgique, 28 (45), pp. 1–22
- 1966. Contribution à l'étude des Ephéméroptères du Surinam, 1952, Bulletin de l'Institut royal des Sciences naturelles de Belgique, 42 (37), pp. 1–22
- 1970. Ephemeroptera des faunes éthiopiennes et malgache, South African Animal Life, 14, pp. 24–170
- 1975. Remarques sur la nervation alaire des Oligoneuridae (Ephemeroptera), Bulletin de l'Institut royal des Sciences naturelles de Belgique, 51, pp. 1–4

== Taxa named after him ==
- Demoulinia Gilles, 1990
- Abacetus demoulini Straeno, 1963
- Adenophlebiodes demoulini Kimmis, 1960
- Afrocurydemus demoulini Selman, 1972
- Brachinus demoulini Basilewsky, 1962
- Caenis demoulini van Bruggen, 1954
- Corindia demoulini Grichanov, 2000
- Dryops demoulini Delève, 1963
- Glossidion demoulini Lugo-Ortiz & McCafferty, 1998
- Gomphoides demoulini St. Quentin, 1967
- Hikanopilon demoulini Matile, 1990
- Hyalophlebia demoulini Kimmins, 1960
- Jana demoulini Berger, 1980
- Leiodytes demoulini Guignot, 1955
- Limnichus demoulini Delève, 1980
- Melanophthalma demoulini Dajoz, 1970
- Odontolabis gazella demoulini Maes, 1981
- Pachnoda demoulini Rigout, 1978
- Thraulus demoulini Peters & Tsyu, 1973
- Triaenodes demoulini Jacquemart, 1967
