= André Bolhuis =

Dutch field hockey player

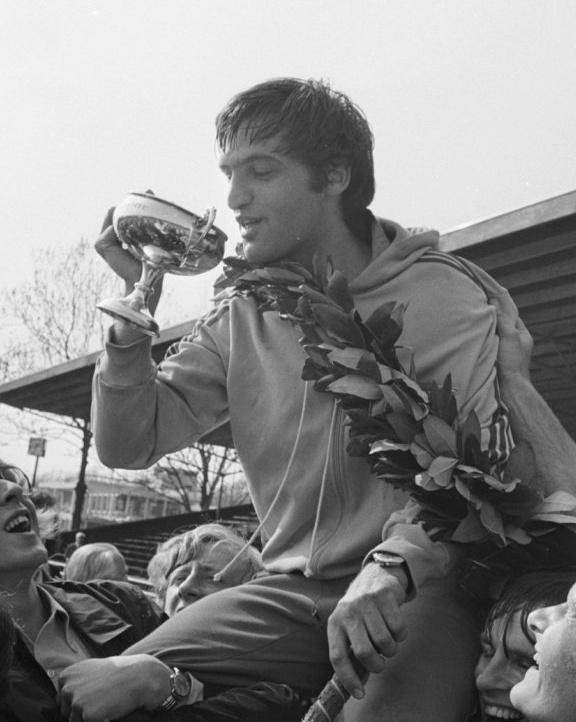
- André Bolhuis in 1972

Personal information
- Born: 4 October 1946 (age 79) Zeist, Netherlands
- Height: 1.80 m (5 ft 11 in)
- Weight: 80 kg (180 lb)

Sport
- Sport: Field hockey
- Club: Kampong, Utrecht
Medal record
Representing the Netherlands
Hockey World Cup
Gold medal – first place	1973 Amstelveen	Team
Silver medal – second place	1978 Buenos Aires	Team

Johan Henk André Bolhuis (born 4 October 1946) is a retired field hockey player from the Netherlands. He competed at the 1972 and 1976 Summer Olympics and finished in fourth place in both Games. He was the Olympic flag bearer for the Netherlands in 1976.

In 1969, Bolhuis was selected for the national team, with which he played 128 matches and took part in four World Cups. He won four national titles between 1972 and 1976 and the World Cup in 1973. Playing the world cup final against India in 1973, he dived to stop a critical shot in extra time, allowing the team to win by penalties. His team lost the 1978 World Cup final and ended up with silver medals. He qualified for the 1980 Olympics, but did not compete because of the boycott of the Games by the Netherlands.

The same year, he retired from competitions to become the head coach (1982) and manager (1983–1984) of the national team, and later chef de mission of the Dutch Olympic team at the 1992 and 1996 Summer Olympics. In 1996, he became a Knight of the Order of Orange-Nassau. Between 1998 and 2006, he was president of the Dutch Field Hockey Federation and, since 18 May 2010, he leads the Dutch Olympic Committee NOC*NSF.

Bolhuis is a dentist by profession, with a PhD in tooth injuries in field hockey.
