= Horace Lanfranchi =

French politician (1935–2024)

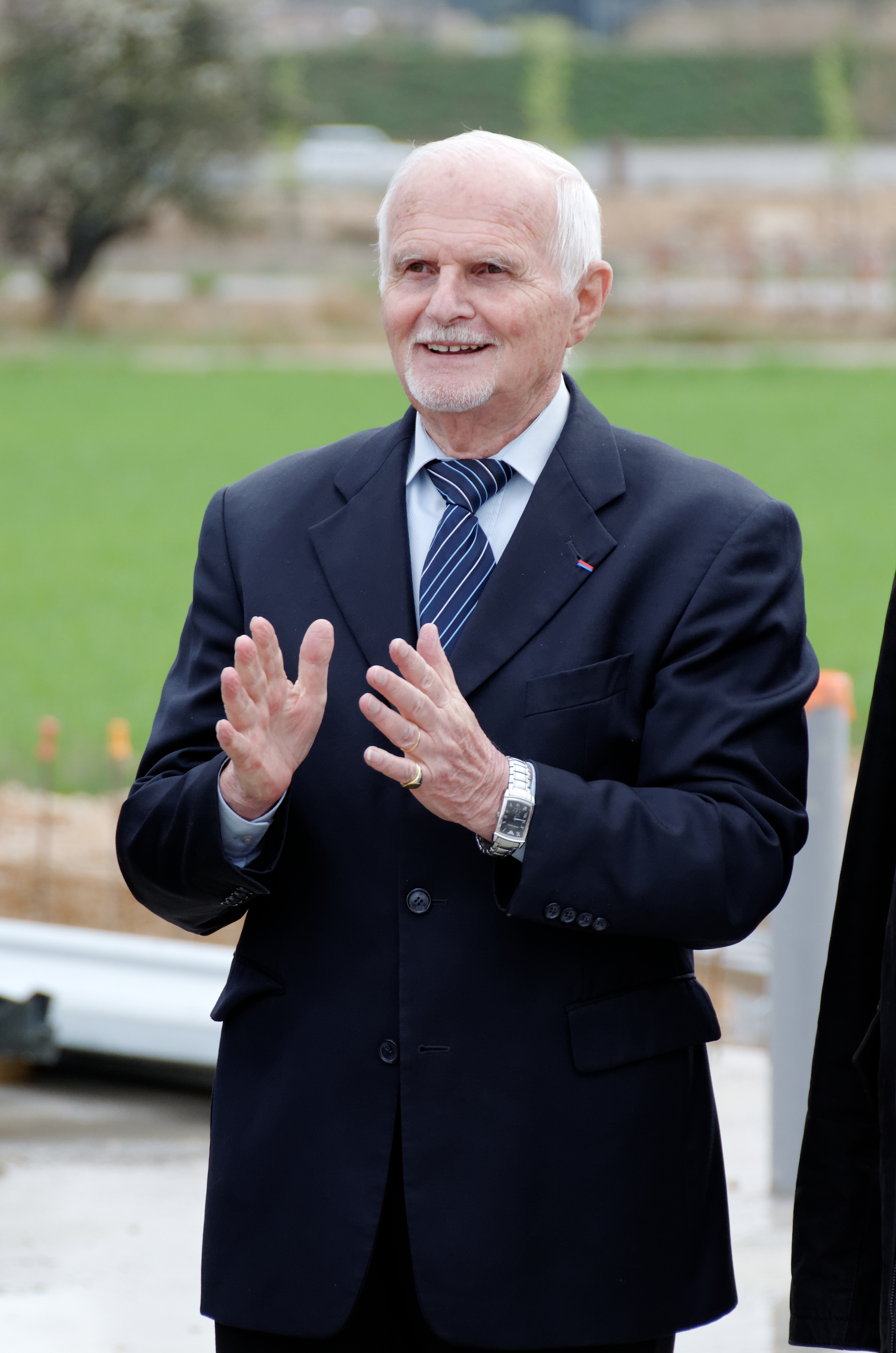
- Lanfranchi in 2011

Mayor of Saint-Maximin-la-Sainte-Baume
- In office 6 October 2017 – 28 June 2020
- Preceded by: Christine Lanfranchi Dorgal
- Succeeded by: Alain Decanis
- In office 19 June 1995 – 9 July 2002
- Preceded by: Émile Olivier
- Succeeded by: Gabriel Rinaudo

President of the General Council of Var
- In office 2 October 2002 – 2 April 2015
- Preceded by: Hubert Falco
- Succeeded by: Marc Giraud

Member of the General Council of Var for the Canton of Saint-Maximin-la-Sainte-Baume
- In office 27 March 1998 – 2 April 2015
- Preceded by: Émile Olivier
- Succeeded by: Sébastien Bourlin

Personal details
- Born: 7 November 1935 Calvi, France
- Died: March 2024 (aged 88)
- Party: UDF; UMP; LR
- Occupation: Teacher

Horace Lanfranchi (7 November 1935 – March 2024) was a French teacher and politician of The Republicans (LR).

From October 2002 to April 2015, he was the president of the general council of Var, following the resignation of Hubert Falco. He was re-elected in 2004, 2008 and 2011.

Horace Lanfranchi died in March 2024, at the age of 88.

== Elective mandates ==
- Municipal council of Saint-Maximin-la-Sainte-Baume:
  - deputy mayor from 1977 to 1989
  - opposition municipal councilor from 1989 to 1993
  - deputy mayor from 1993 to 1995
  - mayor from 1995 to 2002
  - first deputy from 2002 to 2008
- General councilor of the canton of Saint-Maximin-la-Sainte-Baume:
  - elected general councilor in 1998
  - vice president from March 2001 to October 2002
  - president of the general council from October 2002 to April 2015

== Distinctions ==
- Knight of the Ordre national du Mérite
