= Bror Hannes Päivänsalo =

Finnish Lutheran pastor and politician (1875–1933)

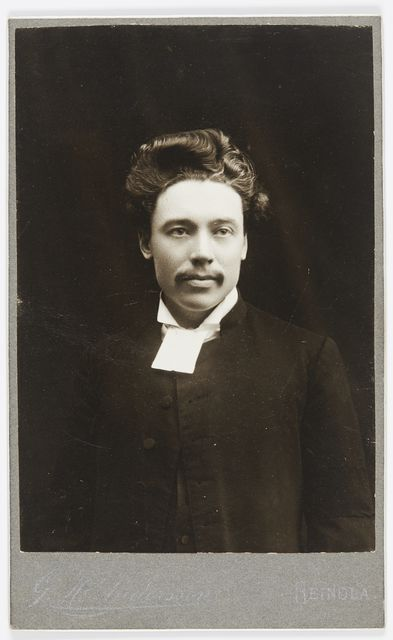
Bror Hannes Päivänsalo

Bror Hannes (B. H.) Päivänsalo (1 January 1875 – 23 August 1933; surname until 1906 Helander) was a Finnish Lutheran pastor and politician, born in Turku. He was a member of the Parliament of Finland from 1917 to 1919 and from 1929 to 1933, representing the Finnish Party until December 1918 and the National Coalition Party after that.
