= 2007 World Shotgun Championships =

The 2007 ISSF World Shotgun Championships were held in Nicosia, Cyprus, from September 3 to September 9, 2007.

== Medal count ==
Rank	Country	Gold	Silver	Bronze	Total
1	Italy	5	2	4	11
2	Cyprus	3	0	1	4
3	China	2	4	0	6
4	Russia	2	1	1	4
5	Germany	2	0	2	4
6	United States	1	5	4	10
7	Kuwait	1	1	0	2
8	Australia	1	0	0	1
8	Spain	1	0	0	1
8	Qatar	1	0	0	1
11	Great Britain	0	1	1	2
11	Ireland	0	1	1	2
11	Sweden	0	1	1	2
14	Czech Republic	0	1	0	1
14	Romania	0	1	0	1
14	Slovakia	0	1	0	1
17	Lebanon	0	0	1	1
17	San Marino	0	0	1	1
17	Turkey	0	0	1	1
17	United Arab Emirates	0	0	1	1

== Results ==
Individual			Team			Junior			Junior Team		
Men's Trap
Gold	Michael Diamond (AUS)	148 (123); FWR	Gold	Kuwait	368	Gold	Valerio Vallifuoco (ITA)	120	Gold	Spain	339
Silver	Philip Murphy (IRL)	145 (123)	Silver	Italy	361	Silver	Saud Meqlad (KUW)	117	Silver	United States	336
Bronze	Karsten Bindrich (GER)	144 (124)	Bronze	Ireland	359	Bronze	Yavuz Ilnam (TUR)	116	Bronze	Italy	332
Men's Double Trap
Gold	Francesco D'Aniello (ITA)	191 (143)	Gold	Italy	430	Gold	Masoud Al Abda (QAT)	137	Gold	Russia	393
Silver	Hu Binyuan (CHN)	190 (143)	Silver	China	422	Silver	Artem Nekrasov (RUS)	135	Silver	United States	383
Bronze	Joshua Richmond (USA)	189 (143)	Bronze	Great Britain	418	Bronze	Mohammad Dhadi (UAE)	134	Bronze	Italy	379
Men's Skeet
Gold	George Achilleos (CYP)	148 (123)	Gold	Cyprus	364	Gold	Anastasios Chapeshis (CYP)	121	Gold	Germany	353
Silver	Ioan Toman (ROU)	147 (123)	Silver	Czech Republic	362	Silver	Marcus Svensson (SWE)	121	Silver	United States	352
Bronze	Vincent Hancock (USA)	147 (123)	Bronze	United States	359	Bronze	Wilfred Blanchard III (USA)	120	Bronze	Sweden	347
Women's Trap
Gold	Liu Yingzi (CHN)	86 (66)	Gold	Italy	195	Gold	Jessica Rossi (ITA)	67	No team championship		
Silver	Deborah Gelisio (ITA)	85 (66)	Silver	China	194	Silver	Abbey Burton (GBR)	62	No team championship		
Bronze	Daniela Del Din (SMR)	85 (67)	Bronze	Germany	191	Bronze	Ray Bassil (LIB)	61	No team championship		
Women's Skeet
Gold	Christine Brinker (GER)	98 (73); EFWR	Gold	China	214	Gold	Emily Blount (USA)	70	Gold	Russia	198
Silver	Wei Ning (CHN)	97 (72)	Silver	United States	210	Silver	Monika Zemkova (SVK)	70	Silver	United States	196
Bronze	Chiara Cainero (ITA)	96 (73)	Bronze	Italy	204	Bronze	Albina Shakirova (RUS)	67	Bronze	Cyprus	179
