= List of flag bearers for the Netherlands at the Olympics =

Netherlands at the Olympics
- Flag of the Netherlands
- IOC code: NED
- NOC: Dutch Olympic Committee*; Dutch Sports Federation
- Website: www.nocnsf.nl (in Dutch)
- Medals: Gold 163 Silver 161 Bronze 179 Total 503

Summer appearances
- 1900; 1904; 1908; 1912; 1920; 1924; 1928; 1932; 1936; 1948; 1952; 1956; 1960; 1964; 1968; 1972; 1976; 1980; 1984; 1988; 1992; 1996; 2000; 2004; 2008; 2012; 2016; 2020; 2024; 2028

Winter appearances
- 1928; 1932; 1936; 1948; 1952; 1956; 1960; 1964; 1968; 1972; 1976; 1980; 1984; 1988; 1992; 1994; 1998; 2002; 2006; 2010; 2014; 2018; 2022; 2026

Other related appearances
- 1906 Intercalated Games

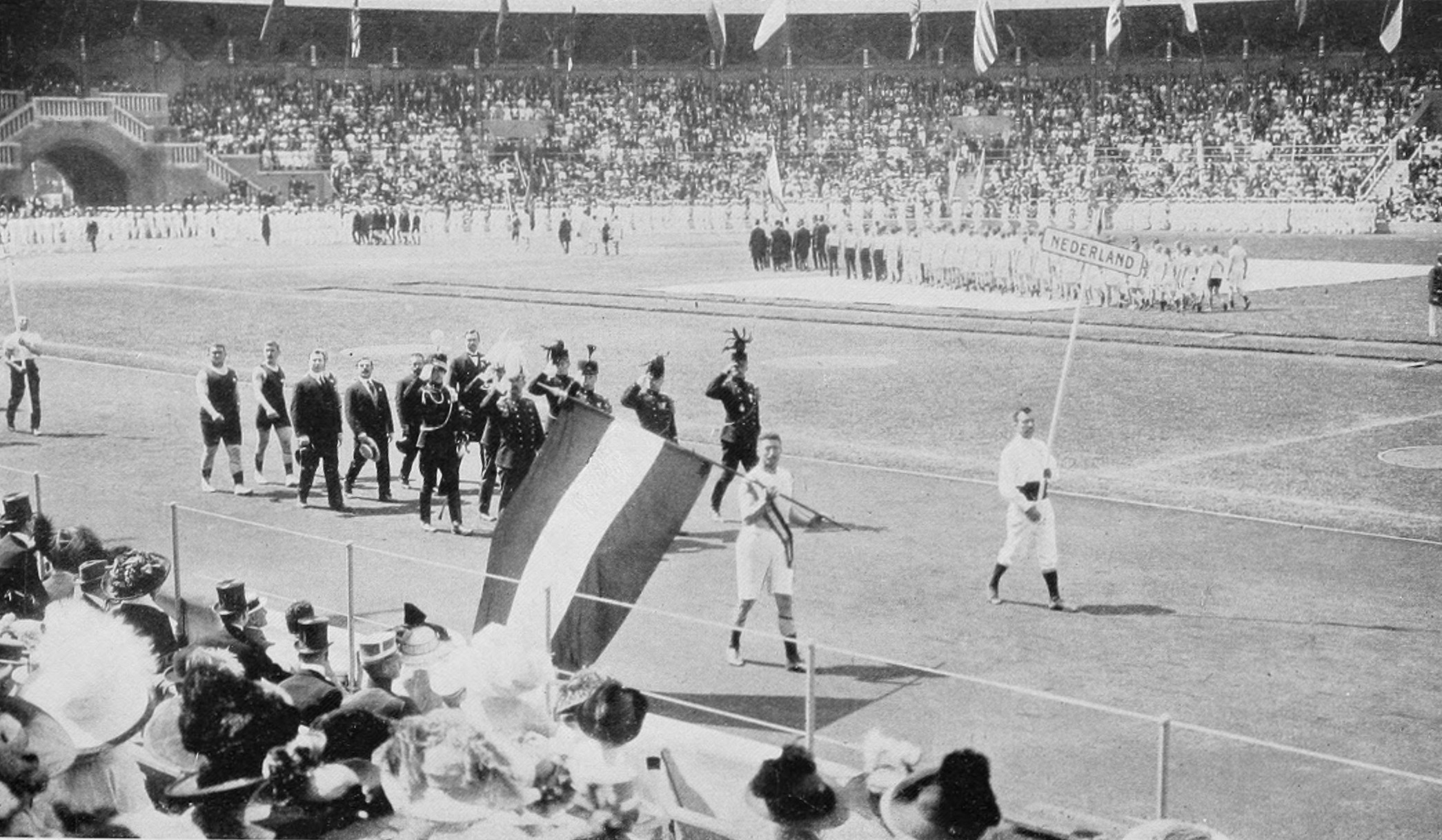
Netherlands at the 1912 Summer Olympics

This is a list of flag bearers who have represented the Netherlands at the Olympics.

== Opening ceremonies ==
Flag bearers carry the national flag of their country at the opening ceremony of the Olympic Games.

#	Year	Season	Flag bearer	Sport
1	1908	Summer	Jan de Boer	Artistic gymnastics
2	1912	Summer	Jan Ploeger	Greco-Roman wrestling (Note: Non-competitor)
3	1920	Summer	J. van Dijk	Official
4	1924	Summer	Adrianus de Jong	Fencing
5	1928	Winter	Edwin Jonkheer Teixeira de Mattos	Bobsleigh
6	1928	Summer	Sam Olij	Boxing
7	1932	Summer	Charles Pahud de Mortanges	Equestrianism
8	1936	Winter	Sam Dunlop	Bobsleigh
9	1936	Summer	Rein de Waal	Field hockey
10	1948	Winter	Jan Langedijk	Speed skating
11	1948	Summer	Wim Landman	Football
12	1952	Winter	Wim van der Voort	Speed skating
13	1952	Summer	Simon de Wit	Official
14	1956	Winter	Kees Broekman	Speed skating
15	1960	Winter	Kees Broekman	Speed skating
16	1960	Summer	Jan Willem van Erven Dorens	Field hockey
17	1964	Winter	Ard Schenk	Speed skating
18	1964	Summer	Anton Geesink	Judo
19	1968	Winter	Stien Baas-Kaiser	Speed skating
20	1968	Summer	Fred van Dorp	Water polo
21	1972	Winter	Atje Keulen-Deelstra	Speed skating
22	1972	Summer	Nico Spits	Field hockey
23	1976	Winter	Dianne de Leeuw	Figure skating
24	1976	Summer	André Bolhuis	Field hockey
25	1980	Winter	Piet Kleine	Speed skating
–	1980	Summer	Team did not march in the opening ceremony	
26	1984	Winter	Hilbert van der Duim	Speed skating
27	1984	Summer	Ton Buunk	Water polo
28	1988	Winter	Jan Ykema	Speed skating
29	1988	Summer	Eric Swinkels	Shooting sport
30	1992	Winter	Leo Visser	Speed skating
31	1992	Summer	Carina Benninga	Field hockey
32	1994	Winter	Christine Aaftink	Speed skating
33	1996	Summer	Nico Rienks	Rowing
34	1998	Winter	Carla Zijlstra	Speed skating
35	2000	Summer	Anky van Grunsven	Equestrianism
36	2002	Winter	Nicolien Sauerbreij	Snowboarding
37	2004	Summer	Mark Huizinga	Judo
38	2006	Winter	Jan Bos	Speed skating
39	2008	Summer	Jeroen Delmee	Field hockey
40	2010	Winter	Timothy Beck	Bobsleigh (Note: Did not compete)
41	2012	Summer	Dorian van Rijsselberghe	Sailing
42	2014	Winter	Jorien ter Mors	Shorttrack and speed skating
43	2016	Summer	Jeroen Dubbeldam	Equestrianism
44	2018	Winter	Jan Smeekens	Speed skating
45	2021	Summer	Churandy Martina	Sprinting
45	2021	Summer	Keet Oldenbeuving	Skateboarding
46	2022	Winter	Kjeld Nuis	Speed skating
46	2022	Winter	Lindsay van Zundert	Figure skating
47	2024	Summer	Lois Abbingh	Handball
47	2024	Summer	Worthy de Jong	3x3 basketball
48	2026	Winter	Kimberley Bos	Skeleton
48	2026	Winter	Jens van 't Wout	Shorttrack

== Closing ceremonies ==
Flag bearers carry the national flag of their country at the closing ceremony of the Olympic Games.

#	Year	Season	Flag bearer	Sport
1	1936	Summer		
2	1948	Summer		
3	1952	Winter		
4	1952	Summer		
5	1956	Winter		
6	1960	Winter		
7	1960	Summer	Eef Kamerbeek	Athletics
8	1964	Winter	Kees Verkerk	Speed skating
9	1964	Summer	Ada Kok	Swimming
10	1968	Winter		
11	1968	Summer	Fred van Dorp	Water polo
12	1972	Winter	Stien Baas-Kaiser	Speed skating
13	1972	Summer	Eef Kamerbeek	Official
14	1976	Winter	Piet Kleine	Speed skating
15	1976	Summer	Evert Kroon	Water polo
16	1980	Winter	Annie Borckink	Speed skating
–	1980	Summer	Team did not march in the closing ceremony	
17	1984	Winter	Yvonne van Gennip	Speed skating
18	1984	Summer	Ria Stalman	Athletics
19	1988	Winter	Yvonne van Gennip	Speed skating
20	1988	Summer	Monique Knol	Cycling
21	1992	Winter	Bart Veldkamp	Speed skating
22	1992	Summer	Piet Raijmakers	Equestrian
23	1994	Winter	Rintje Ritsma	Speed skating
24	1996	Summer	Peter Blangé	Volleyball
25	1998	Winter	Gianni Romme	Speed skating
26	2000	Summer	Inge de Bruijn	Swimming
27	2002	Winter	Gerard van Velde	Speed skating
28	2004	Summer	Leontien van Moorsel	Cycling
29	2006	Winter	Rintje Ritsma	Speed skating
30	2008	Summer	Maarten van der Weijden	Swimming
31	2010	Winter	Sven Kramer	Speed skating
32	2012	Summer	Ranomi Kromowidjojo	Swimming
33	2014	Winter	Bob de Jong	Speed skating
34	2016	Summer	Sanne Wevers	Gymnastics
35	2018	Winter	Ireen Wüst	Speed skating
36	2020	Summer	Sifan Hassan	Athletics
37	2022	Winter	Irene Schouten	Speed skating
38	2024	Summer	Femke Bol	Athletics
38	2024	Summer	Harrie Lavreysen	Cycling
39	2026	Winter	Jorrit Bergsma	Speed skating
39	2026	Winter	Xandra Velzeboer	Short-track speed skating

== See also ==
- Netherlands at the Olympics
