= Bror Friberg =

New Zealand immigration agent

Bror Erik Friberg (6 July 1839 – 3 February 1878) was a New Zealand immigration agent. He was born in Kristianstad, Sweden on 6 July 1839. He died on 3 February 1878 at Norsewood, New Zealand.
