= Kim Ha-yeon (sport shooter) =

South Korean sports shooter

Kim Ha-yeon (born 15 April 1967) is a South Korean sport shooter who competed in the 1988 Summer Olympics.
