= Wolfgang Trautwein =

German sports shooter

Personal information
- Nationality: German
- Born: 6 June 1961 (age 63); Lonsheim, Germany

Sport
- Sport: Sports shooting

Wolfgang Trautwein (born 6 June 1961) is a German sports shooter. He competed at the 1984 Summer Olympics and the 1988 Summer Olympics.
