= Přílepy (Rakovník District) =

- Municipality
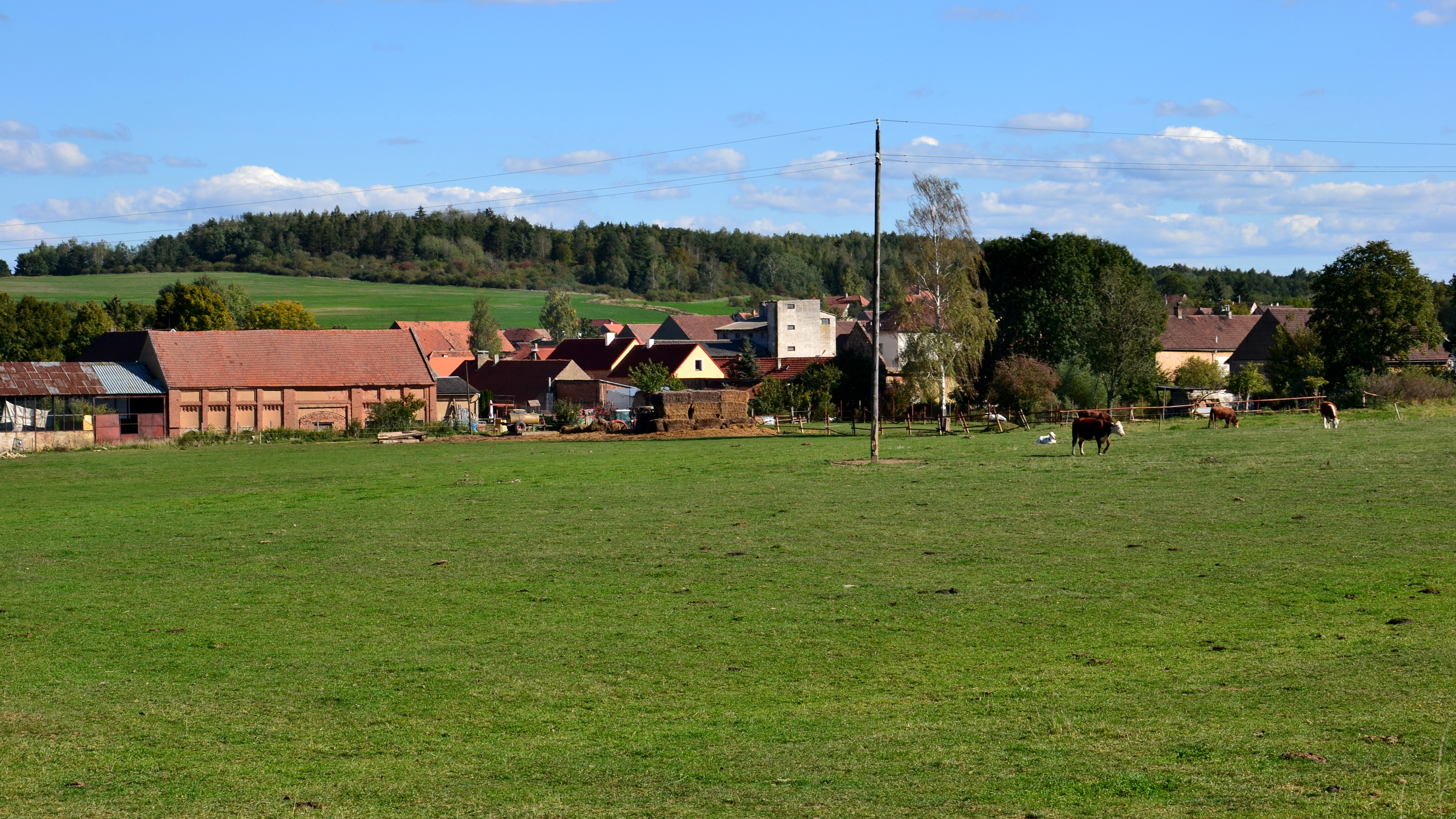
- View from the southwest

- Location in the Czech Republic
- Coordinates: 50°7′24″N 13°37′58″E
- Country: Czech Republic
- Region: Central Bohemian
- District: Rakovník
- First mentioned: 1399

Area
  - Total: 6.64 km^{2} (2.56 sq mi)
- Elevation: 353 m (1,158 ft)

Population (2026-01-01)
  - Total: 234
  - Density: 35.2/km^{2} (91.3/sq mi)
- Time zone: UTC+1 (CET)
  - Summer (DST): UTC+2 (CEST)
- Postal code: 270 01
- Website: www.prilepy.eu

Přílepy is a municipality and village in Rakovník District in the Central Bohemian Region of the Czech Republic. It has about 200 inhabitants.

== Demographics ==
Historical population
Year	Pop.	±%
1869	499	—
1880	535	+7.2%
1890	589	+10.1%
1900	676	+14.8%
1910	681	+0.7%
1921	652	−4.3%
1930	578	−11.3%
1950	366	−36.7%
1961	300	−18.0%
1970	267	−11.0%
1980	223	−16.5%
1991	195	−12.6%
2001	165	−15.4%
2011	194	+17.6%
2021	216	+11.3%
Source: Censuses
