= Ole Riber Rasmussen =

Danish sport shooter (1955–2017)

Medal record

Men's shooting

Representing Denmark

Olympic Games
Silver medal – second place	1984 Los Angeles	Skeet

Ole Riber Rasmussen (28 September 1955 – 11 February 2017) was a Danish sport shooter. He won the silver medal in Skeet shooting in the 1984 Summer Olympics in Los Angeles and represented his country in three other Summer Olympics in 1988, 1992 and 1996
