= Soichiro Ito (sport shooter) =

Japanese sports shooter

Soichiro Ito (伊東 総一郎, Itō Sōichirō; born 21 October 1947) is a sport shooter who competed in the 1992 Summer Olympics and in the 1996 Summer Olympics.
