= Eric Swinkels =

Dutch sport shooter

Personal information
- Born: 30 March 1949 (age 77) Best, Netherlands

Sport
- Sport: Sport shooting
Medal record
Men's shooting
Representing Netherlands
Olympic Games
Silver medal – second place	1976 Montreal	Skeet Shooting

Eric Swinkels (born 30 March 1949) is a Dutch sport shooter and Olympic medalist. He won a silver medal in skeet shooting at the 1976 Summer Olympics in Montreal. He competed in six different Olympic competitions, beginning in 1972 and ending in 1996.

== See also ==
- List of athletes with the most appearances at Olympic Games

Olympic Games
Preceded by Ton Buunk	Flagbearer for Netherlands; Seoul 1988	Succeeded by Carina Benninga
