= Shooting at the 2015 European Games – Men's skeet =

Men's skeet at the 2015 European Games
- Venue: Baku Shooting Centre
- Date: 20–21 June
- Competitors: 30 from 19 nations

Medalists
gold medal	Valerio Luchini	Italy
silver medal	Stefan Nilsson	Sweden
bronze medal	Marko Kemppainen	Finland

The Men's skeet competition at the 2015 European Games in Baku, Azerbaijan was held on 20 and 21 June at the Baku Shooting Centre.

== Schedule ==
All times are local (UTC+5).

Date	Time	Event
Saturday, 20 June 2015	09:00	Qualification
Sunday, 21 June 2015	09:00	Qualification
Sunday, 21 June 2015	14:45	Semifinal
Sunday, 21 June 2015	15:05	Final

== Results ==
=== Qualification ===
Rank	Athlete	Series					Total	Note
Rank	Athlete	1	2	3	4	5	Total	Note
1	Anthony Terras (FRA)	25	24	25	25	25	124	
2	Jan Sychra (CZE)	24	25	25	24	25	123	CB:98
3	Marko Kemppainen (FIN)	24	25	25	24	25	123	CB:96
4	Valerio Luchini (ITA)	25	25	24	25	24	123	
5	Jesper Hansen (DEN)	25	25	25	24	24	123	
6	Stefan Nilsson (SWE)	25	24	24	24	25	122	+7
7	Nikolaos Mavrommatis (GRE)	25	24	24	25	24	122	+6
8	Fabio Ramella (SUI)	23	23	25	25	25	121	
9	Mikola Milchev (UKR)	25	22	24	25	25	121	
10	Georgios Achilleos (CYP)	25	23	25	25	23	121	
11	Tore Brovold (NOR)	25	24	25	24	23	121	CB:114
12	Riccardo Filippelli (ITA)	25	24	25	24	23	121	CB:112
13	Michael Gilligan (GBR)	25	24	23	23	25	120	
14	Tommi Takanen (FIN)	25	24	25	23	23	120	
15	Valeriy Shomin (RUS)	25	24	24	25	22	120	
16	Jakub Tomeček (CZE)	24	24	23	24	24	119	
17	Efthimios Mitas (GRE)	24	24	24	23	24	119	
18	Éric Delaunay (FRA)	25	24	24	23	23	119	
19	Andreas Chasikos (CYP)	23	24	24	23	24	118	
20	Juan José Aramburu (ESP)	23	24	24	22	24	117	
21	Sebastian Kuntschik (AUT)	22	23	24	25	23	117	
22	Štefan Zemko (SVK)	25	22	22	25	23	117	
23	Ralf Buchheim (GER)	23	23	25	23	23	117	
24	Emin Jafarov (AZE)	24	24	22	22	24	116	
25	Ronaldas Račinskas (LTU)	24	23	25	22	19	113	
26	Alexander Zemlin (RUS)	25	21	22	21	23	112	
27	Jeremy Harry Bird (GBR)	20	24	22	22	23	111	
28	Hákon Svavarsson (ISL)	23	22	24	21	21	111	
29	Sven Korte (GER)	23	23	21	20	23	110	
30	Pasha Ahmadpour Khanghah (AZE)	21	23	24	22	20	110	

=== Semifinal ===
Rank	Athlete	Score	S-off
1	Valerio Luchini (ITA)	15	
2	Stefan Nilsson (SWE)	14	12
3	Jesper Hansen (DEN)	14	11
4	Marko Kemppainen (FIN)	14	11
5	Jan Sychra (CZE)	14	3
6	Anthony Terras (FRA)	13	

=== Finals ===
==== Bronze medal match ====
Rank	Athlete	Score	S-off
3rd place, bronze medalist(s)	Marko Kemppainen (FIN)	15	
4	Jesper Hansen (DEN)	13	

==== Gold medal match ====
Rank	Athlete	Score	S-off
1st place, gold medalist(s)	Valerio Luchini (ITA)	16	
2nd place, silver medalist(s)	Stefan Nilsson (SWE)	14	
