= Vincent Hancock =

American sports shooter (born 1989)

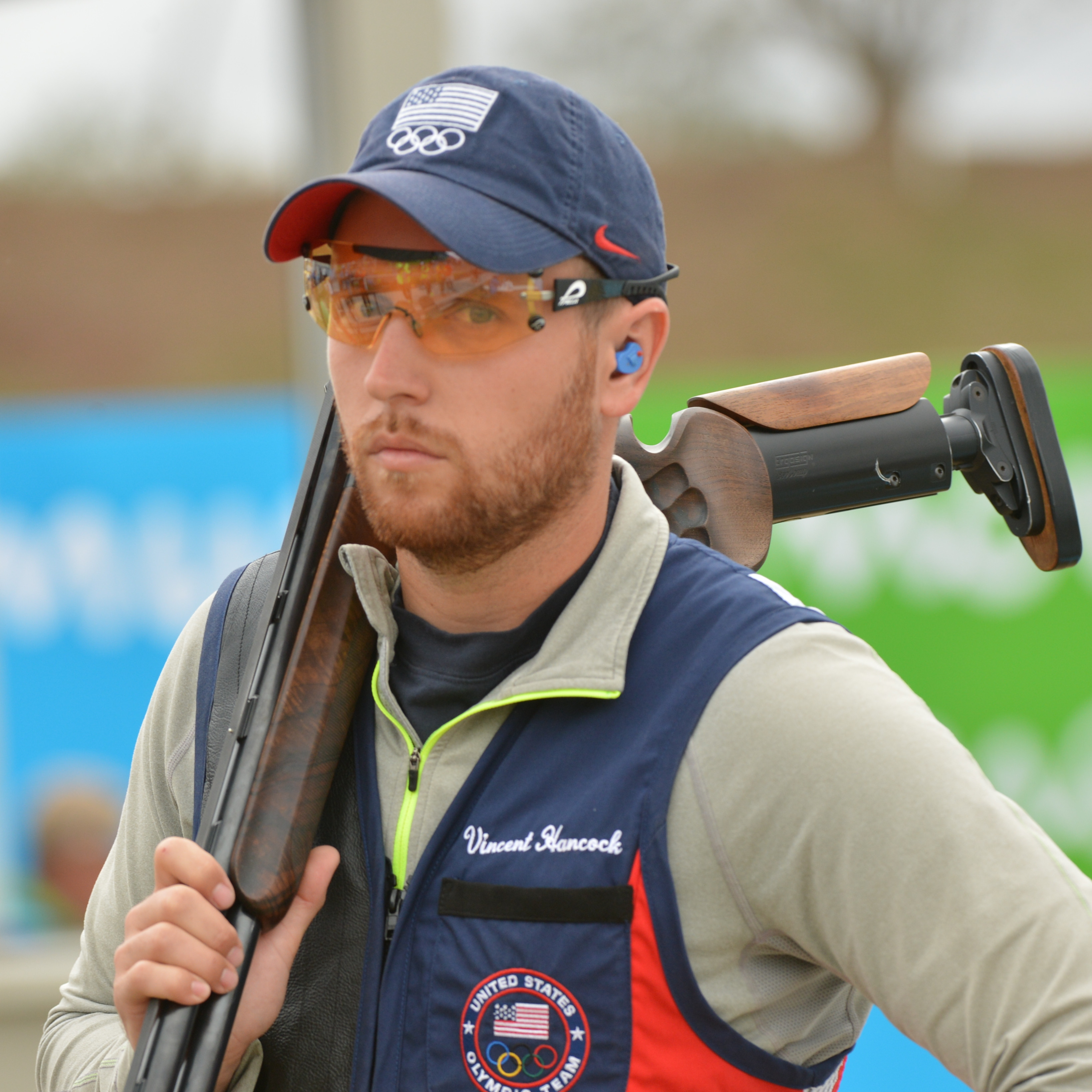
- Hancock at the 2016 Summer Olympics

Personal information
- Born: March 19, 1989 (age 37) Port Charlotte, Florida, U.S.
- Home town: Eatonton, Georgia, U.S.
- Education: Troy University
- Height: 1.72 m (5 ft 8 in)
- Weight: 80 kg (176 lb)

Sport
- Country: United States
- Sport: Shooting
- Event: Skeet
- Club: U.S. Army
Medal record
Men's shooting
Representing the United States
Olympic Games
Gold medal – first place	2008 Beijing	Skeet
Gold medal – first place	2012 London	Skeet
Gold medal – first place	2020 Tokyo	Skeet
Gold medal – first place	2024 Paris	Skeet
Silver medal – second place	2024 Paris	Skeet mixed team
World Championships
Gold medal – first place	2005 Lonato	Skeet
Gold medal – first place	2009 Maribor	Skeet
Gold medal – first place	2015 Lonato	Skeet
Gold medal – first place	2018 Changwon	Skeet
Gold medal – first place	2023 Baku	Skeet team
Gold medal – first place	2023 Baku	Skeet mixed team
Silver medal – second place	2022 Osijek	Skeet
Silver medal – second place	2022 Osijek	Skeet team
Bronze medal – third place	2007 Nicosia	Skeet
Pan American Games
Gold medal – first place	2007 Rio	Skeet
Gold medal – first place	2011 Guadalajara	Skeet
Gold medal – first place	2023 Santiago	Skeet
World Cup Final
Gold medal – first place	2018 Changwon	Skeet
Silver medal – second place	2005 Munich	Skeet
Silver medal – second place	2008 Minsk	Skeet
Silver medal – second place	2009 Beijing	Skeet
Silver medal – second place	2012 Maribor	Skeet
Silver medal – second place	2015 Gabala	Skeet
Silver medal – second place	2019 Al Ain	Skeet

Vincent Charles Hancock (born March 19, 1989) is an American Army sergeant, sports shooter, and four-time Olympic champion. He won the gold medal in men's skeet shooting at the 2008 Summer Olympics (with a then Olympic record), 2012 Summer Olympics, 2020 Summer Olympics, and 2024 Summer Olympics. He is the first skeet shooter to repeat as the Olympic champion.

== Biography ==
In 2005, at age 16, Hancock won his first World Championship title in men's skeet and went on to win the prestigious International Shooting Sport Federation's Shooter of the Year award. He won the gold medal in the World Championships in 2009.

Hancock later attended Troy University in Troy, Alabama, where he graduated in 2014 with a degree in business management. After his graduation, Hancock became a sergeant in the U.S. Army Marksmanship Unit, and in 2015 became the third athlete to win three men's skeet World Championships. He has participated in 11 World Championships.

Following his gold medal win in the 2015 World Championships, Hancock represented the United States at the 2016 Summer Olympics. He finished in 15th place.

He qualified to represent the United States at the 2020 Summer Olympics, where he won his third Olympic gold medal, ahead of Jesper Hansen of Denmark and Abdullah Alrashidi of Kuwait.

Hancock is one of the most decorated shooters in the history of the sport, holding a total of 29 medals from various world competitions, including the Olympics.

== Personal life ==
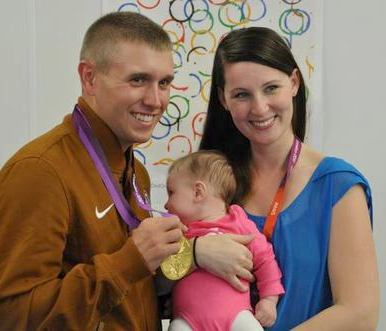
Hancock with family in 2012

Hancock resides in Fort Worth, Texas, with his wife and two daughters. He is an owner of Northlake Shooting Sports, a youth-oriented range focused on clay shooting where he has coached fellow Olympic medalist Conner Prince. In 2024, Hancock expressed an interest in shifting attention from Olympic training to the business side of sport shooting and plans to open multiple shooting ranges in the United States, though after winning at Paris he has said he plans to compete in the 2028 games. Hancock is a Christian.

== Records ==
Current world records held in skeet
Men	Qualification	125	Valerio Luchini (ITA); Vincent Hancock (USA); Georgios Achilleos (CYP); Anthony Terras (FRA); Tammaro Cassandro (ITA); Riccardo Filippelli (ITA); Ralf Buchheim (GER); Vincent Hancock (USA); Vincent Hancock (USA); Luke Argiro (AUS); Luigi Lodde (ITA); Emmanuel Petit (FRA); Tammaro Cassandro (ITA); Vincent Hancock (USA); Luigi Lodde (ITA); Stefan Nilsson (SWE); Vincent Hancock (USA); Jesper Hansen (DEN); Vincent Hancock (USA); Azmy Mehelba (EGY); Vincent Hancock (USA); Ben Llewellin (GBR); Tammaro Cassandro (ITA); Vincent Hancock (USA)	July 9, 2014; March 9, 2015; April 27, 2015; September 17, 2015; June 10, 2016; July 10, 2016; July 10, 2016; September 14, 2018; March 25, 2019; April 14, 2019; August 22, 2019; September 14, 2019; May 10, 2021; April 27, 2022; April 27, 2022; October 9, 2022; March 7, 2023; July 12, 2023; August 19, 2023; August 19, 2023; October 22, 2023; July 27, 2025; July 27, 2025; December 7, 2025	Beijing (CHN); Acapulco (MEX); Larnaka (CYP); Lonato (ITA); San Marino (SMR); Lonato (ITA); Lonato (ITA); Changwon (KOR); Guadalajara (MEX); Al Ain (UAE); Lahti (FIN); Lonato (ITA); Lonato (ITA); Lonato (ITA); Lonato (ITA); Osijek (CRO); Doha (QAT); Lonato (ITA); Baku (AZE); Baku (AZE); Santiago (CHI); Chateauroux (FRA); Chateauroux (FRA); Doha (QAT)
Men	Final	36	Vincent Hancock (USA)	July 7, 2026	Lonato (ITA)

World records held in Skeet from 2005 to 2012
Men	Qualification	125	Vincent Hancock (USA); Tore Brovold (NOR); Mykola Milchev (UKR); Jan Sychra (CZE); Tore Brovold (NOR); Jan Sychra (CZE); Antonakis Andreou (CYP); Juan José Aramburu (ESP); Nasser Al-Attiyah (QAT); Anthony Terras (FRA); Efthimios Mitas (GRE)	14 June 2007; 13 July 2008; 9 May 2009; 20 May 2009; 25 July 2009; 7 March 2011; 22 April 2011; 13 September 2011; 17 January 2012; 26 March 2012; 26 March 2012	Lonato (ITA); Nicosia (CYP); Cairo (EGY); Munich (GER); Osijek (CRO); Concepción (CHI); Beijing (CHN); Belgrade (SER); Doha (QAT); Tucson (USA); Tucson (USA)
Men	Final	150	Vincent Hancock (USA) (125+25); Tore Brovold (NOR) (125+25); Tore Brovold (NOR) (125+25); Jan Sychra (CZE) (125+25); Nasser Al-Attiyah (QAT) (125+25); Efthimios Mitas (GRE) (125+25)	14 June 2007; 13 July 2008; 25 July 2009; 7 March 2011; 17 January 2012; 26 March 2012	Lonato (ITA); Nicosia (CYP); Osijek (CRO); Concepción (CHI); Doha (QAT); Tucson (USA)
Junior Men	Individual	125	Vincent Hancock (USA)	June 14, 2007	Lonato (ITA)

== Performance timeline ==
=== Skeet ===
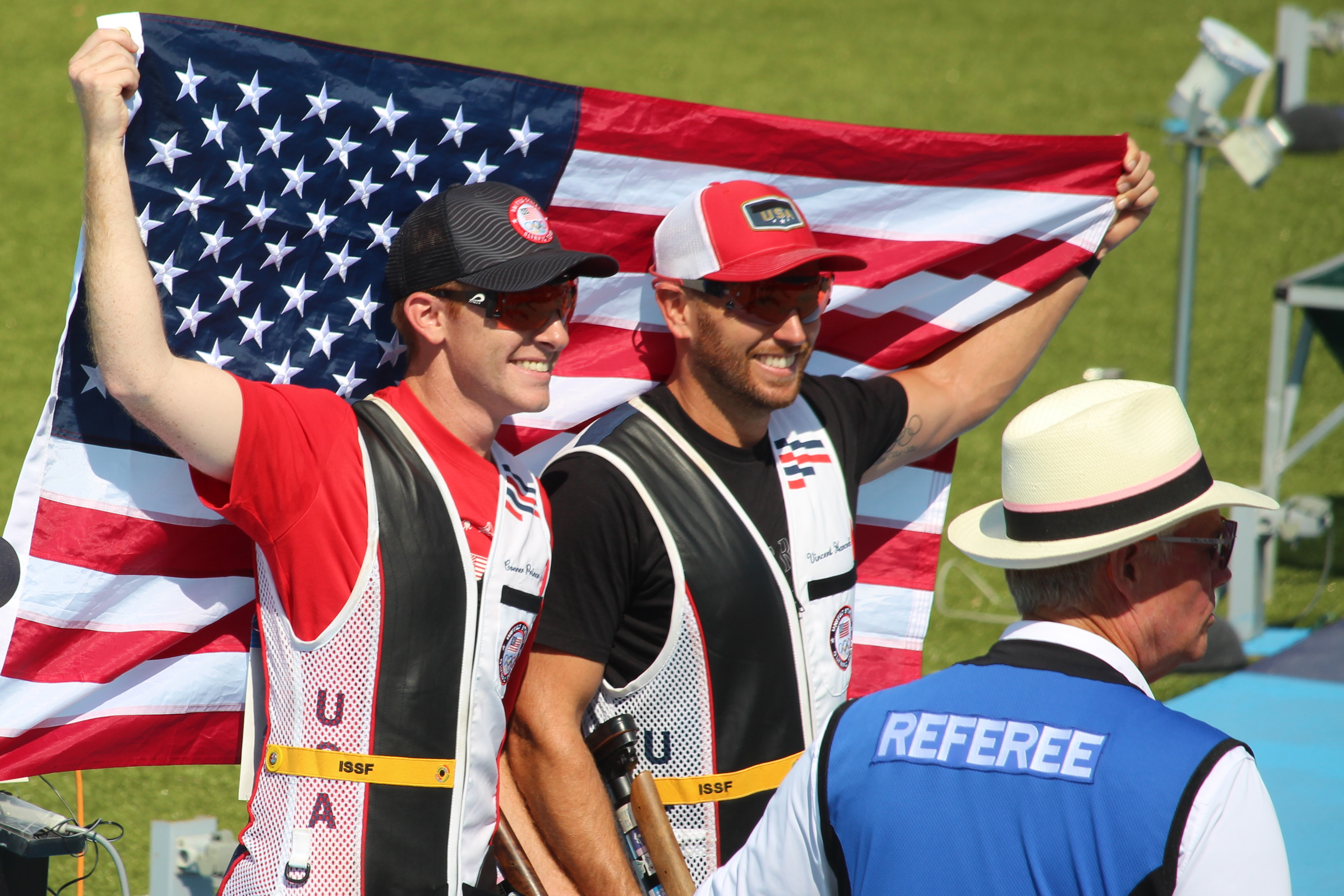
Hancock with his student Conner Prince celebrating their gold and silver medals at the 2024 Summer Olympics

	2005	2006	2007	2008	2009	2010	2011	2012	2013	2014	2015	2016	2017	2018	2019	2020	2021	2022
Olympic Games	Not held			(gold) Gold; 121+24	Not held			(gold) Gold; 123+25	Not held			15th 119	Not held				(gold) Gold; 122+59	Not held
World Championships	(gold); 123+25	Not held	(bronze) Bronze; 123+24	Not held	(gold) Gold; 124+25	5th 123+24	67th 119	—	10th 121	9th 121	(gold) Gold; 122(16)+16	—	—	(gold) Gold; 125+59	—	—	—	(silver) Silver; 123(32)+27+35
Pan American Games/COTA	Not held	Not held	(gold) Gold; 122+25	Not held	—	Not held	(gold) Gold; 122+25	Not held	—	Not held	—	Not held	—	Not held	—	Not held	—	
World Cup 1	(gold) Gold; 124+25	—	28th 118	4th 121+21	—	4th 122+24	7th 122	11th 121	(gold) Gold; 123+59	—	(gold) Gold; 125(16)+16	4th 121(14)+14	—	(gold) Gold; 123+59	(gold) Gold	—	—	—
World Cup 2	(silver) Silver; 124+24	5th 120+24	—	—	10th 121		33rd 119	4th 122+24	—	12th 120	4th 123(15)+14	5th 122(14)	—	(gold) Gold; 123+59	—	Not held	—	(silver) Silver; 125(6)+28+38
World Cup 3	(gold) Gold; 123+25	—	(gold) Gold; 125+25	(gold) Gold; 123+24	—	4th 123+21	—	—	—	41st 119	44th 117	(bronze) Bronze; 123(15)+16	—	(gold) Gold; 123+56	(gold) Gold	Not held	(silver) Silver	(gold) Gold; 123(6)+30+34
World Cup 4	(gold) Gold; 124+25	—	—	—	10th 117	(bronze) Bronze; 122+25	69th 116	—	33rd 119	—	(gold) Gold; 124(16)+15	—	—	—	—	Not held	—	—
World Cup Final	(silver) Silver; 123+25	NQ	DNS	(silver) Silver; 123+24	(silver) Silver; 122+21	—	—	(silver) Silver; 122+24	—	—	(silver) Silver; 123(16)+15	5th 121(14)	—	(gold) Gold	(silver) Silver	Not held	—	—
