= Shooting at the 2012 Summer Olympics – Men's skeet =

Men's skeet at the Games of the XXX Olympiad
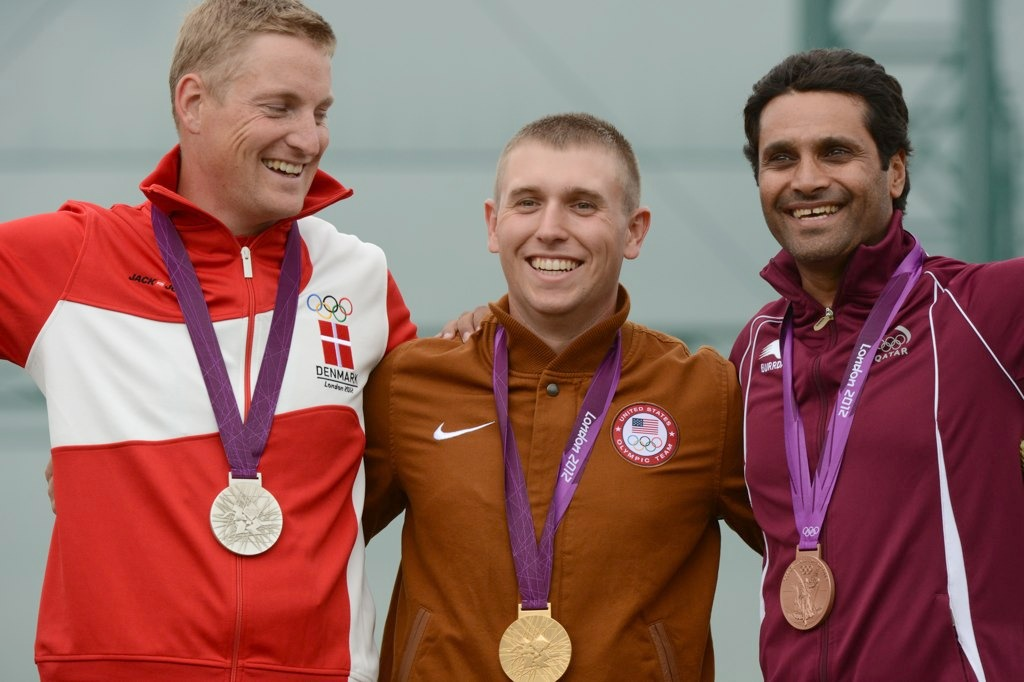
- Left-right: Golding, Hancock, Al-Attiyah
- Venue: Royal Artillery Barracks
- Date: 30 July 2012; 31 July 2012
- Competitors: 36 from 26 nations
- Winning score: 148

Medalists
| 1st place, gold medalist(s) | | Vincent Hancock | United States |
| 2nd place, silver medalist(s) | | Anders Golding | Denmark |
| 3rd place, bronze medalist(s) | | Nasser Al-Attiyah | Qatar |

The Men's skeet event at the 2012 Olympic Games took place on 30 and 31 July 2012 at the Royal Artillery Barracks. The event consisted of two rounds: a qualifier and a final. In the qualifier, each shooter fired 5 sets of 25 shots in the set order of skeet shooting. The top 6 shooters in the qualifying round moved on to the final round. There, they fired one additional round of 25. The total score from all 150 shots was used to determine the final ranking.

== Records ==
Prior to this competition, the existing world and Olympic records were as follows.

Qualification records
| World record | Vincent Hancock (USA) | 125 | Lonato, Italy | 14 June 2007 |
| Olympic record | Vincent Hancock (USA) | 121 | Beijing, China | 16 August 2008 |

- Hancock improved his Olympic qualification record from the last Olympic with two points.

Final records
| World record | Vincent Hancock (USA) | 150 (125+25) | Lonato, Italy | 14 June 2007 |
| Olympic record | Vincent Hancock (USA); Tore Brovold (NOR) | 145 (121+24); 145 (120+25) | Beijing, China | 16 August 2008 |

- Hancock improved his Olympic record from the last Olympic with three points.

== Qualification round ==
| Rank | Athlete | Country | 1 | 2 | 3 | 4 | 5 | Total | Notes |
|---|---|---|---|---|---|---|---|---|---|
| 1 | Vincent Hancock | United States | 25 | 24 | 25 | 24 | 25 | 123 | Q, OR |
| 2 | Anders Golding | Denmark | 24 | 23 | 25 | 25 | 25 | 122 | Q |
| 3 | Valeriy Shomin | Russia | 23 | 24 | 24 | 25 | 25 | 121 | Q |
| 4 | Nasser Al-Attiyah | Qatar | 25 | 23 | 24 | 24 | 25 | 121 | Q |
| 5 | Luigi Lodde | Italy | 21 | 25 | 24 | 25 | 25 | 120 | Q |
| 6 | Jan Sychra | Czech Republic | 23 | 23 | 25 | 24 | 25 | 120 | Q |
| 7 | Marcus Svensson | Sweden | 22 | 24 | 24 | 24 | 25 | 119 | |
| 8 | Frank Thompson | United States | 24 | 23 | 24 | 23 | 25 | 119 | |
| 9 | Nikolaos Mavrommatis | Greece | 23 | 25 | 23 | 24 | 24 | 119 | |
| 10 | Ralf Buchheim | Germany | 23 | 21 | 24 | 25 | 25 | 118 | |
| 11 | Georgios Achilleos | Cyprus | 23 | 22 | 24 | 24 | 25 | 118 | |
| 12 | Richard Brickell | Great Britain | 24 | 22 | 23 | 25 | 24 | 118 | |
| 13 | Saeed Al-Maktoum | United Arab Emirates | 21 | 24 | 25 | 24 | 24 | 118 | |
| 14 | Ennio Falco | Italy | 24 | 23 | 24 | 23 | 24 | 118 | |
| 15 | Stefan Nilsson | Sweden | 22 | 25 | 25 | 22 | 24 | 118 | |
| 16 | Rory Warlow | Great Britain | 24 | 24 | 22 | 25 | 23 | 118 | |
| 17 | Anthony Terras | France | 21 | 24 | 24 | 25 | 23 | 117 | |
| 18 | Mostafa Hamdy | Egypt | 23 | 25 | 22 | 24 | 23 | 117 | |
| 19 | Jakub Tomeček | Czech Republic | 24 | 23 | 23 | 25 | 22 | 117 | |
| 20 | Keith Ferguson | Australia | 23 | 22 | 23 | 22 | 24 | 116 | |
| 21 | Abdullah Al-Rashidi | Kuwait | 23 | 24 | 24 | 21 | 24 | 116 | |
| 22 | Antonakis Andreou | Cyprus | 22 | 23 | 23 | 24 | 23 | 115 | |
| 23 | Juan José Aramburu | Spain | 23 | 22 | 24 | 24 | 22 | 115 | |
| 24 | Javier Rodríguez | Mexico | 23 | 22 | 23 | 22 | 24 | 114 | |
| 25 | Efthimios Mitas | Greece | 22 | 24 | 23 | 22 | 23 | 114 | |
| 26 | Jesper Hansen | Denmark | 22 | 22 | 24 | 24 | 21 | 113 | |
| 27 | Tore Brovold | Norway | 22 | 25 | 22 | 24 | 20 | 113 | |
| 28 | Khurram Inam | Pakistan | 21 | 23 | 23 | 20 | 25 | 112 | |
| 29 | Majed Al-Tamimi | Saudi Arabia | 23 | 18 | 20 | 25 | 21 | 111 | |
| 30 | Guillermo Alfredo Torres | Cuba | 20 | 21 | 25 | 22 | 22 | 110 | |
| 31 | Paul Brian Rosario | Philippines | 22 | 19 | 25 | 22 | 24 | 109 | |
| 32 | Nicolás Pacheco | Peru | 21 | 21 | 21 | 22 | 24 | 109 | |
| 33 | Clive Barton | Australia | 20 | 22 | 25 | 21 | 21 | 109 | |
| 34 | Fabio Ramella | Switzerland | 21 | 23 | 22 | 23 | 20 | 109 | |
| 35 | Cho Yong-Seong | South Korea | 24 | 21 | 23 | 22 | 19 | 109 | |
| 36 | Azmy Mehelba | Egypt | 21 | 19 | 24 | 24 | 20 | 108 | |

== Final ==
| Rank | Athlete | Qual | Final | Total | Bronze shoot-off | Notes |
|---|---|---|---|---|---|---|
| 1st place, gold medalist(s) | Vincent Hancock (USA) | 123 | 25 | 148 | | OR |
| 2nd place, silver medalist(s) | Anders Golding (DEN) | 122 | 24 | 146 | | |
| 3rd place, bronze medalist(s) | Nasser Al-Attiyah (QAT) | 121 | 23 | 144 | 6 | |
| 4 | Valeriy Shomin (RUS) | 121 | 23 | 144 | 5 | |
| 5 | Luigi Lodde (ITA) | 120 | 23 | 143 | | |
| 6 | Jan Sychra (CZE) | 120 | 23 | 143 | | |
