= Shooting at the 2008 Summer Olympics – Men's skeet =

Men's skeet at the Games of the XXIX Olympiad
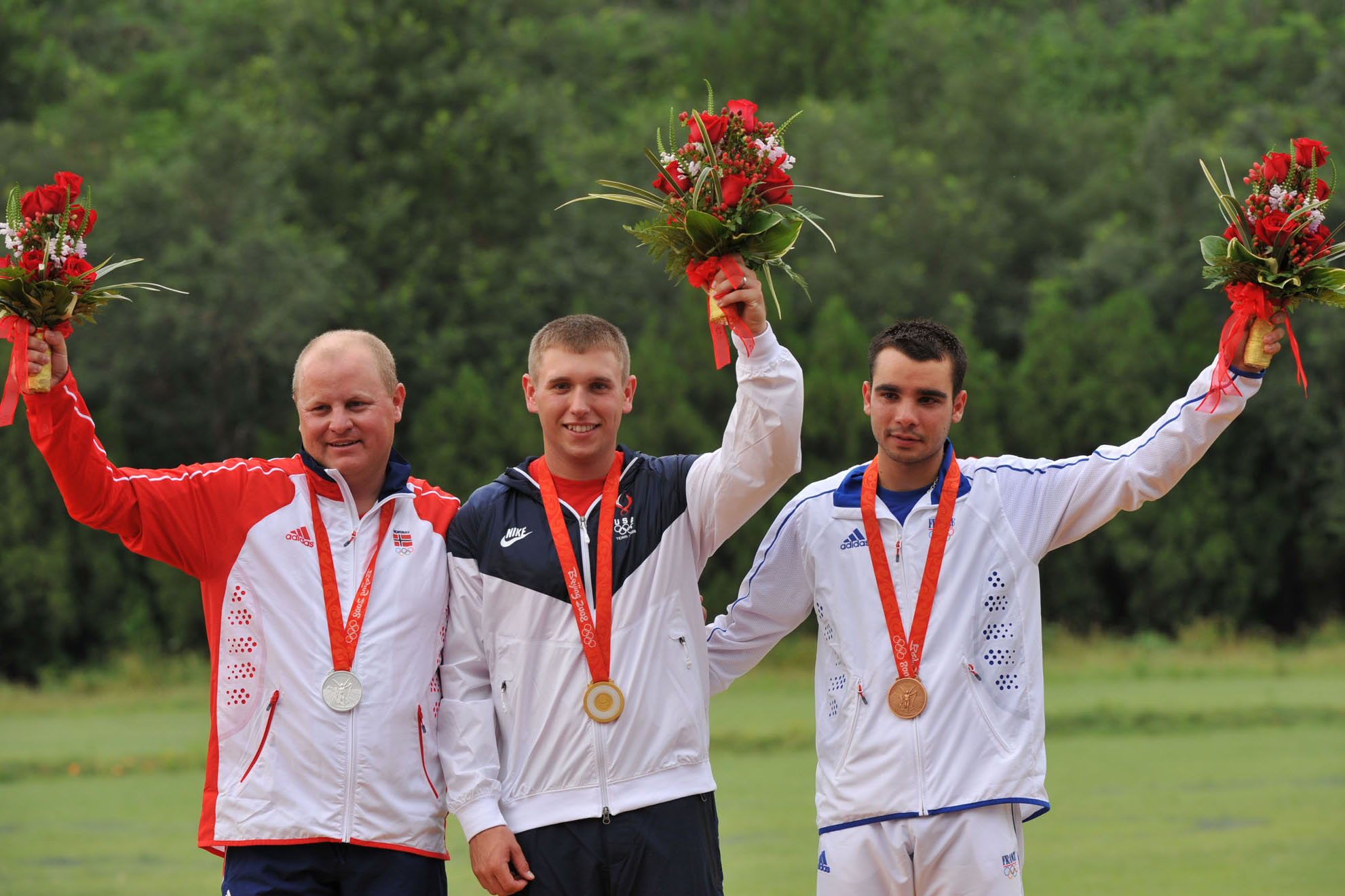
- Medal winners, from left: Brovold, Hancock, Terras
- Venue: Beijing Shooting Range Clay Target Field
- Date: August 15, 2008; August 16, 2008
- Competitors: 41 from 30 nations
- Winning score: 145 (OR)

Medalists
| 1st place, gold medalist(s) | | Vincent Hancock | United States |
| 2nd place, silver medalist(s) | | Tore Brovold | Norway |
| 3rd place, bronze medalist(s) | | Anthony Terras | France |

The Men's skeet event at the 2008 Olympic Games took place on August 15 and 16 at the Beijing Shooting Range Clay Target Field.

The event consisted of two rounds: a qualifier and a final. In the qualifier, each shooter fired 5 sets of 25 shots in the set order of skeet shooting.

The top 6 shooters in the qualifying round moved on to the final round. There, they fired one additional round of 25. The total score from all 150 shots determined the rankings, with shoot-offs used to break ties.

Vincent Hancock from the United States took a one-hit lead in the qualification round. In the final round, Norway's Tore Brovold, who was one of Hancock's main rivals, erased the deficit with a perfect score of 25 in the final, thus tying Hancock at the Olympic record score of 145 hits. Hancock came back to win the shoot-off for the gold medal. One hit behind the duo, Anthony Terras of France won the bronze medal shoot-off against Antonis Nikolaidis, denying Cyprus its first-ever Olympic medal.

== Records ==
Prior to this competition, the existing world and Olympic records were as follows.

Qualification records
| World record | Vincent Hancock (USA); Tore Brovold (NOR) | 125 | Lonato, Italy; Nicosia, Cyprus | 14 June 2007; 13 July 2008 |
| Olympic record | ISSF Rule changed on 01.01.2005 | – | – | – |

Final records
| World record | Vincent Hancock (USA); Tore Brovold (NOR) | 150 (125+25) | Lonato, Italy; Nicosia, Cyprus | 14 June 2007; 13 July 2008 |
| Olympic record | ISSF Rule changed on 01.01.2005 | – | – | – |

== Qualification round ==
| Rank | Athlete | Country | 1 | 2 | 3 | Day 1 | 4 | 5 | Total | Shoot-off | Notes |
|---|---|---|---|---|---|---|---|---|---|---|---|
| 1 | Vincent Hancock | United States | 25 | 24 | 24 | 73 | 24 | 24 | 121 | | Q OR |
| 2 | Tore Brovold | Norway | 25 | 23 | 23 | 71 | 25 | 24 | 120 | | Q |
| 3 | Anthony Terras | France | 24 | 24 | 24 | 72 | 25 | 23 | 120 | | Q |
| 4 | Antonis Nikolaidis | Cyprus | 24 | 24 | 24 | 72 | 25 | 23 | 120 | | Q |
| 5 | Georgios Achilleos | Cyprus | 23 | 24 | 23 | 70 | 25 | 24 | 119 | | Q |
| 6 | Qu Ridong | China | 24 | 23 | 23 | 70 | 23 | 25 | 118 | 4 | Q |
| 7 | Jin Di | China | 24 | 22 | 24 | 70 | 24 | 24 | 118 | 3 | |
| 8 | Juan Jose Aramburu | Spain | 22 | 25 | 23 | 70 | 24 | 24 | 118 | 3 | |
| 9 | Abdullah Al-Rashidi | Kuwait | 25 | 23 | 24 | 72 | 22 | 24 | 118 | 3 | |
| 10 | Zaid Al-Mutairi | Kuwait | 23 | 25 | 22 | 70 | 24 | 24 | 118 | 1 | |
| 11 | Randal McLelland | United States | 24 | 23 | 23 | 70 | 25 | 23 | 118 | 1 | |
| 12 | Harald Jensen | Norway | 24 | 25 | 23 | 72 | 24 | 22 | 118 | 1 | |
| 13 | Tino Wenzel | Germany | 23 | 22 | 23 | 68 | 25 | 24 | 117 | | |
| 14 | Ennio Falco | Italy | 23 | 23 | 24 | 70 | 24 | 23 | 117 | | |
| 15 | Nasser Al-Attiyah | Qatar | 24 | 23 | 23 | 70 | 25 | 22 | 117 | | |
| 16 | Jan Sychra | Czech Republic | 25 | 24 | 21 | 70 | 25 | 22 | 117 | | |
| 17 | George Barton | Australia | 23 | 24 | 24 | 71 | 21 | 24 | 116 | | |
| 18 | Andrei Inešin | Estonia | 22 | 24 | 20 | 66 | 24 | 25 | 115 | | |
| 19 | Valeriy Shomin | Russia | 22 | 23 | 23 | 68 | 22 | 25 | 115 | | |
| 20 | Axel Wegner | Germany | 22 | 22 | 25 | 69 | 23 | 23 | 115 | | |
| 21 | Mario Nunez | Spain | 23 | 24 | 24 | 71 | 22 | 22 | 115 | | |
| 22 | Saeed Al Maktoum | United Arab Emirates | 23 | 24 | 24 | 71 | 21 | 22 | 114 | | |
| 23 | Konstantin Tsuranov | Russia | 21 | 22 | 23 | 66 | 24 | 23 | 113 | | |
| 24 | Andrea Benelli | Italy | 22 | 24 | 22 | 68 | 23 | 22 | 113 | | |
| 25 | Anders Golding | Denmark | 20 | 24 | 24 | 68 | 23 | 21 | 112 | | |
| 26 | Juan Carlos Romero | Guatemala | 24 | 21 | 23 | 68 | 21 | 22 | 111 | | |
| 27 | Ariel Mauricio Flores | Mexico | 23 | 22 | 23 | 68 | 22 | 21 | 111 | | |
| 28 | Jorge Atalah | Chile | 22 | 22 | 24 | 68 | 23 | 20 | 111 | | |
| 29 | Ziad Richa | Lebanon | 24 | 22 | 23 | 69 | 23 | 19 | 111 | | |
| 30 | Paul Rahman | Australia | 22 | 23 | 19 | 64 | 25 | 21 | 110 | | |
| 31 | Julio Elizardo Dujarric Lembcke | Dominican Republic | 23 | 24 | 21 | 68 | 21 | 21 | 110 | | |
| 32 | Mikola Milchev | Ukraine | 20 | 23 | 21 | 64 | 22 | 23 | 109 | | |
| 33 | Georgios Salavantakis | Greece | 21 | 20 | 23 | 64 | 23 | 22 | 109 | | |
| 34 | Andrei Gerachtchenko | Belarus | 21 | 22 | 25 | 68 | 23 | 18 | 109 | | |
| 35 | Ioan Toman | Romania | 21 | 19 | 23 | 63 | 22 | 23 | 108 | | |
| 36 | Franco Donato | Egypt | 19 | 21 | 22 | 62 | 21 | 23 | 106 | | |
| 37 | Rashid Saleh Al-Athba | Qatar | 22 | 22 | 18 | 62 | 22 | 22 | 106 | | |
| 38 | Diego Duarte | Colombia | 21 | 23 | 21 | 65 | 22 | 19 | 106 | | |
| 39 | Saied Al-Mutairi | Saudi Arabia | 21 | 20 | 22 | 63 | 22 | 19 | 104 | | |
| 40 | Marco Matellini | Peru | 17 | 19 | 15 | 51 | 22 | 22 | 95 | | |
| 41 | Roger Dahi | Syria | 19 | 21 | 19 | 59 | 11 | 21 | 91 | | |

OR Olympic record – Q Qualified for final

== Final ==
| Rank | Athlete | Qual | Final | Total | Bronze shoot-off | Gold shoot-off | Notes |
|---|---|---|---|---|---|---|---|
| 1st place, gold medalist(s) | Vincent Hancock (USA) | 121 | 24 | 145 | | 4 | OR |
| 2nd place, silver medalist(s) | Tore Brovold (NOR) | 120 | 25 | 145 | | 3 | OR |
| 3rd place, bronze medalist(s) | Anthony Terras (FRA) | 120 | 24 | 144 | 3 | | |
| 4 | Antonis Nikolaidis (CYP) | 120 | 24 | 144 | 2 | | |
| 5 | Georgios Achilleos (CYP) | 119 | 24 | 143 | | | |
| 6 | Qu Ridong (CHN) | 118 | 24 | 142 | | | |

OR Olympic record
