= 2008 ISSF World Cup Final (shotgun) =

The 2008 ISSF World Cup Final in shotgun events was held on 27–30 September in Minsk, Belarus. It was the last major worldwide shotgun competition in 2008, and the next-to-last part of the 2008 ISSF World Cup, to be concluded with the rifle and pistol finals in Bangkok a month later.

There were twelve spots in each of the five events. The defending champion from the 2007 World Cup Final and all medalists of the 2008 Olympics in Beijing qualified automatically for Minsk. The remaining eight qualified through a special point-awarding system based on their best performance during the World Cup season, skipping past automatic qualifiers. Not counting the defending champion and the Olympic medalists, there was a maximum of two shooters per event from the same country. Belarus, being the host country, also were allowed to participate with one shooter.

The qualification system awarded a win with 15 points, a silver medal with 10, a bronze medal with 8, a fourth place with 5, a fifth with 4, a sixth with 3, a seventh with 2 and an eighth place with 1 point. It also gave out points for qualification scores within a certain range from the current world record: from 1 point for fourteen hits off the record, to 15 points for equalling or raising it.

== Schedule and winners ==
All times are local (UTC+3).

Day	Event	Final time	Winner
27 September (Saturday)	Men's double trap	15:00	Håkan Dahlby (SWE)
29 September (Monday)	Men's trap, day 1		
29 September (Monday)	Men's skeet, day 1		
29 September (Monday)	Women's trap	16:00	Irina Laricheva (RUS)
29 September (Monday)	Women's skeet	16:45	Andri Eleftheriou (CYP)
30 September (Tuesday)	Men's trap, day 2	14:45	Giovanni Pellielo (ITA)
30 September (Tuesday)	Men's skeet, day 2	15:30	Tore Brovold (NOR)

== Men's trap ==
=== Qualification ===
Shooter	Event	Rank points	Score points	Total
Erminio Frasca (ITA)	WCF 2007	Defending champion		
David Kostelecký (CZE)	OG Beijing	Olympic gold medalist		
Giovanni Pellielo (ITA)	OG Beijing	Olympic silver medalist		
Aleksei Alipov (RUS)	OG Beijing	Olympic bronze medalist		
Michael Diamond (AUS)	WC Kerrville	15	13	28
Stéphane Clamens (FRA)	WC Belgrade	15	12	27
Mário Filipovič (SVK)	WC Beijing	15	8	23
Bret Erickson (USA)	WC Suhl	10	12	22
Dominic Grazioli (USA)	WC Kerrville	8	13	21
Massimo Fabbrizi (ITA)	WC Belgrade	10	11	21
Massimiliano Mola (ITA)	WC Kerrville	10	10	20
Francesco Amici (SMR)	WC Belgrade	8	10	18

=== Results ===
Rank	Shooter	Day 1	Day 2	Qual	Notes	Final	Total	Shoot-off
1st place, gold medalist(s)	Giovanni Pellielo (ITA)	73	47	120		25	145	
2nd place, silver medalist(s)	Michael Diamond (AUS)	73	49	122		22	144	
3rd place, bronze medalist(s)	Aleksei Alipov (RUS)	73	50	123		19	142	
4	Erminio Frasca (ITA)	71	47	118		23	141	
5	David Kostelecký (CZE)	72	48	120		19	139	3
6	Missimiliano Mola (ITA)	71	47	118		21	139	2
7	Dominic Grazioli (USA)	71	46	117				
8	Stéphane Clamens (FRA)	71	46	117				
9	Mário Filipovič (SVK)	68	47	115				
10	Massimo Fabbrizi (ITA)	71	44	115				
11	Francesco Amici (SMR)	69	45	114				
12	Bret Erickson (USA)	64	0	64	DNF			

DNF Did not finish

== Men's double trap ==
=== Qualification ===
Shooter	Event	Rank points	Score points	Total
Walton Eller (USA)	WCF 2007	Defending champion		
Francesco D'Aniello (ITA)	OG Beijing	Olympic silver medalist		
Hu Binyuan (CHN)	OG Beijing	Olympic bronze medalist		
Ronjan Sodhi (IND)	WC Belgrade	15	15	30
Richard Faulds (GBR)	WC Suhl	15	15	30
Vasily Mosin (RUS)	WC Beijing	15	13	28
Håkan Dahlby (SWE)	WC Kerrville	15	12	27
Roland Gerebics (HUN)	WC Suhl	8	12	20
Jeffrey Holguin (USA)	WC Kerrville	8	10	18
Saif Alshamsy (UAE)	WC Beijing	8	8	16
Hamad Alafasi (KUW)	WC Suhl	3	12	15

Faulds and Alshamsy did not participate and were replaced by Daniele Di Spigno and Mikhail Leybo.

=== Results ===
Rank	Shooter	A	B	C	Qual	Final	Total	Shoot-off
1st place, gold medalist(s)	Håkan Dahlby (SWE)	47	49	48	144	47	191	
2nd place, silver medalist(s)	Hu Binyuan (CHN)	46	46	48	140	48	188	23
3rd place, bronze medalist(s)	Vasily Mosin (RUS)	48	48	47	143	45	188	22
4	Francesco D'Aniello (ITA)	45	48	46	139	47	186	
5	Roland Gerebics (HUN)	45	46	48	139	45	184	4
6	Mikhail Leybo (RUS)	47	44	47	138	46	184	3
7	Jeffrey Holguin (USA)	44	46	46	136			
8	Ronjan Sodhi (IND)	48	47	41	136			
9	Walton Eller (USA)	48	45	42	135			
10	Hamad Alafasi (KUW)	44	44	45	133			
11	Daniele Di Spigno (ITA)	46	41	45	132			

== Men's skeet ==
=== Qualification ===
Shooter	Event	Rank points	Score points	Total
Georgios Achilleos (CYP)	WCF 2007	Defending champion		
Vincent Hancock (USA)	OG Beijing	Olympic gold medalist		
Tore Brovold (NOR)	OG Beijing	Olympic silver medalist		
Anthony Terras (FRA)	OG Beijing	Olympic bronze medalist		
Ariel Mauricio Flores (MEX)	WC Kerrville	15	12	27
Qu Ridong (CHN)	WC Beijing	15	10	25
Andrea Benelli (ITA)	WC Belgrade	10	13	23
Konstantin Tsuranov (RUS)	WC Beijing	10	10	20
Jan Sychra (CZE)	WC Belgrade	5	13	18
Valerio Luchini (ITA)	WC Kerrville	8	10	18
Leos Hlavacek (CZE)	WC Suhl	5	11	16
Abdullah Alrashidi (KUW)	WC Belgrade	3	12	15

Flores did not participate and was replaced by Frank Thompson. In addition, Andrei Gerachtchenko entered as the host country's wild card.

=== Results ===
Rank	Shooter	Day 1	Day 2	Qual	Shoot-off	Final	Total	Shoot-off
1st place, gold medalist(s)	Tore Brovold (NOR)	73	50	123		25	148	
2nd place, silver medalist(s)	Vincent Hancock (USA)	73	50	123		24	147	
3rd place, bronze medalist(s)	Jan Sychra (CZE)	72	49	121		23	144	2
4	Abdullah Alrashidi (KUW)	71	49	120		24	144	1
5	Andrea Benelli (ITA)	71	48	119	2	24	143	
6	Valerio Luchini (ITA)	70	49	119	2	23	142	
7	Georgios Achilleos (CYP)	71	48	119	1			
8	Leos Hlavacek (CZE)	71	47	118				
9	Anthony Terras (FRA)	68	48	116				
10	Qu Ridong (CHN)	68	47	115				
11	Frank Thompson (USA)	69	46	115				
12	Andrei Gerachtchenko (BLR)	69	45	114				
13	Konstantin Tsuranov (RUS)	68	43	111				

== Women's trap ==
=== Qualification ===
Shooter	Event	Rank points	Score points	Total
Giulia Iannotti (ITA)	WCF 2007	Defending champion		
Satu Mäkelä-Nummela (FIN)	OG Beijing	Olympic gold medalist		
Zuzana Štefečeková (SVK)	OG Beijing	Olympic silver medalist		
Corey Cogdell (USA)	OG Beijing	Olympic bronze medalist		
Theresa DeWitt (USA)	WC Kerrville	15	14	29
Jessica Rossi (ITA)	WC Suhl	15	13	28
Gao E (CHN)	WC Beijing	15	12	27
Daniela Del Din (SMR)	WC Suhl	10	14	24
Irina Laricheva (RUS)	WC Kerrville	10	13	23
Anita North (GBR)	WC Belgrade	10	10	20
Pak Yong Hui (PRK)	WC Beijing	10	10	20
Liu Yingzi (CHN)	WC Suhl	8	11	19

Pak did not participate and was replaced by Joetta Dement.

=== Results ===
Rank	Shooter	Qual	Shoot-off	Final	Total
1st place, gold medalist(s)	Irina Laricheva (RUS)	72		22	94
2nd place, silver medalist(s)	Liu Yingzi (CHN)	71		21	92
3rd place, bronze medalist(s)	Giulia Iannotti (ITA)	69		21	90
4	Daniela Del Din (SMR)	70		19	89
5	Theresa DeWitt (USA)	66	5	20	86
6	Jessica Rossi (ITA)	67		18	85
7	Joetta Dement (USA)	66	4		
8	Gao E (CHN)	66	3		
9	Zuzana Štefečeková (SVK)	66	0		
10	Corey Cogdell (USA)	66	0		
11	Anita North (GBR)	65			
12	Satu Mäkelä-Nummela (FIN)	65			

== Women's skeet ==
=== Qualification ===
Shooter	Event	Rank points	Score points	Total
Erdzhanik Avetisyan (RUS)	WCF 2007	Defending champion		
Chiara Cainero (ITA)	OG Beijing	Olympic gold medalist		
Kim Rhode (USA)	OG Beijing	Olympic silver medalist		
Christine Brinker (GER)	OG Beijing	Olympic bronze medalist		
Haley Dunn (USA)	WC Kerrville	15	14	29
Andri Eleftheriou (CYP)	WC Belgrade	15	14	29
Wei Ning (CHN)	WC Beijing	15	13	28
Diana Bacosi (ITA)	WC Suhl	15	13	28
Danka Barteková (SVK)	WC Suhl	10	13	23
Connie Smotek (USA)	WC Kerrville	8	10	18
Zhang Shan (CHN)	WC Beijing	4	12	16
Nathalie Larsson (SWE)	WC Beijing	5	11	16

Avetisyan, Brinker and Bacosi did not participate and were replaced by Katiuscia Spada.

=== Results ===
Rank	Shooter	Qual	Shoot-off	Notes	Final	Total	Shoot-off
1st place, gold medalist(s)	Andri Eleftheriou (CYP)	73			22	95	
2nd place, silver medalist(s)	Haley Dunn (USA)	71			22	93	
3rd place, bronze medalist(s)	Katiuscia Spada (ITA)	68	5		24	92	
4	Kim Rhode (USA)	69			22	91	2
5	Nathalie Larsson (SWE)	69			22	91	1
6	Chiara Cainero (ITA)	69			21	90	
7	Wei Ning (CHN)	68	4				
8	Connie Smotek (USA)	66					
9	Danka Barteková (SVK)	60					
	Zhang Shan (CHN)			DNS			

DNS Did not start
