= Anthony Terras =

French sport shooter

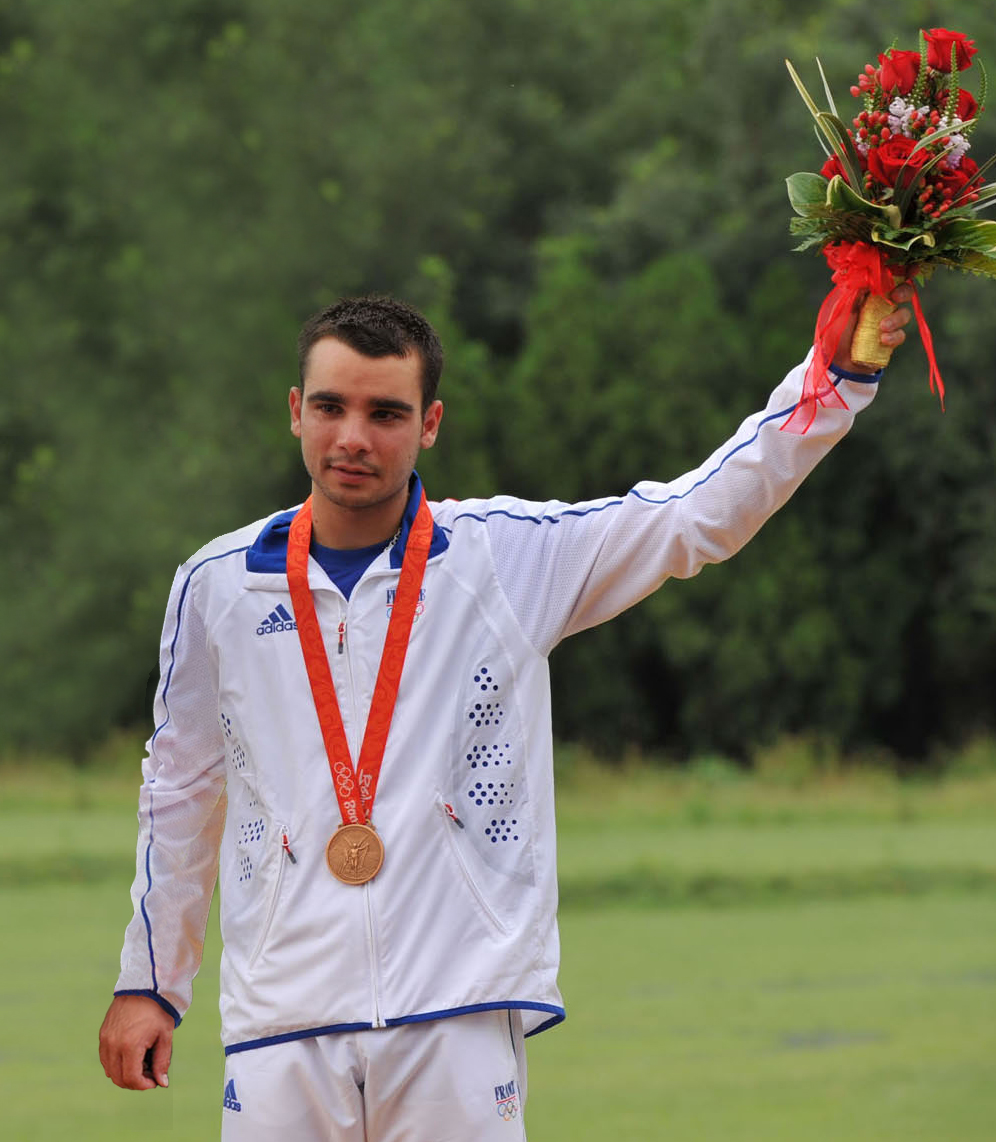

Personal information
- Nationality: French
- Born: 21 June 1985 (age 41) Marseille, France
- Height: 1.71 m (5 ft 7 in)
- Weight: 64 kg (141 lb)

Sport
- Country: France
- Sport: Shooting
- Event: Skeet
- Club: BTC Grand Arbois
Medal record
Men's shooting
Representing France
Olympic Games
Bronze medal – third place	2008 Beijing	Skeet
World Championships
Gold medal – first place	2018 Changwon	Skeet team

Anthony Terras (born 21 June 1985) is a French shooter and Olympic athlete who won the bronze medal at the Men's skeet at the 2008 Beijing Olympics.

== Records ==
Current world records held in skeet
Men	Qualification	125	Valerio Luchini (ITA); Vincent Hancock (USA); Georgios Achilleos (CYP); Anthony Terras (FRA); Tammaro Cassandro (ITA); Riccardo Filippelli (ITA); Ralf Buchheim (GER); Vincent Hancock (USA); Vincent Hancock (USA); Luke Argiro (AUS); Luigi Lodde (ITA); Emmanuel Petit (FRA); Tammaro Cassandro (ITA); Vincent Hancock (USA); Luigi Lodde (ITA); Stefan Nilsson (SWE); Vincent Hancock (USA); Jesper Hansen (DEN); Vincent Hancock (USA); Azmy Mehelba (EGY); Vincent Hancock (USA); Ben Llewellin (GBR); Tammaro Cassandro (ITA); Vincent Hancock (USA)	July 9, 2014; March 9, 2015; April 27, 2015; September 17, 2015; June 10, 2016; July 10, 2016; July 10, 2016; September 14, 2018; March 25, 2019; April 14, 2019; August 22, 2019; September 14, 2019; May 10, 2021; April 27, 2022; April 27, 2022; October 9, 2022; March 7, 2023; July 12, 2023; August 19, 2023; August 19, 2023; October 22, 2023; July 27, 2025; July 27, 2025; December 7, 2025	Beijing (CHN); Acapulco (MEX); Larnaka (CYP); Lonato (ITA); San Marino (SMR); Lonato (ITA); Lonato (ITA); Changwon (KOR); Guadalajara (MEX); Al Ain (UAE); Lahti (FIN); Lonato (ITA); Lonato (ITA); Lonato (ITA); Lonato (ITA); Osijek (CRO); Doha (QAT); Lonato (ITA); Baku (AZE); Baku (AZE); Santiago (CHI); Chateauroux (FRA); Chateauroux (FRA); Doha (QAT)

World records held in Skeet from 2005 to 2012
Men	Qualification	125	Vincent Hancock (USA); Tore Brovold (NOR); Mykola Milchev (UKR); Jan Sychra (CZE); Tore Brovold (NOR); Jan Sychra (CZE); Antonakis Andreou (CYP); Juan José Aramburu (ESP); Nasser Al-Attiyah (QAT); Anthony Terras (FRA); Efthimios Mitas (GRE)	14 June 2007; 13 July 2008; 9 May 2009; 20 May 2009; 25 July 2009; 7 March 2011; 22 April 2011; 13 September 2011; 17 January 2012; 26 March 2012; 26 March 2012	Lonato (ITA); Nicosia (CYP); Cairo (EGY); Munich (GER); Osijek (CRO); Concepción (CHI); Beijing (CHN); Belgrade (SER); Doha (QAT); Tucson (USA); Tucson (USA)
