= 2014 European Shotgun Championships =

- Dates: 16 - 27 June
- Host city: Sarlóspuszta, Hungary
- Level: Senior
- Events: 10

The 2014 European Shotgun Championships was the 60th edition of the global shotgun competition, European Shotgun Championships, organised by the European Shooting Confederation.

== Results ==
=== Men ===
| Event | 1st place, gold medalist(s) | 2nd place, silver medalist(s) | 3rd place, bronze medalist(s) |
|---|---|---|---|
| Trap (20.06) | Andreas Scherhaufer; Austria | Massimo Fabbrizi; Italy | David Kostelecký; Czech Republic |
| Trap (team) | Italy; Massimo Fabbrizi; Mauro De Filippis; Giovanni Pellielo; 364 pts. | Poland; Piotr Kowalczyk; Jaromir Wojtasiewicz; Jakub Trzebiński; 357 pts. | Croatia; Anton Glasnović; Giovanni Cernogoraz; Josip Glasnović; 353 pts. |
| Double trap (22.06) | Steven Scott; Great Britain | Vasily Mosin; Russia | Marco Innocenti; Italy |
| Double trap (team) | Italy; Marco Innocenti; Davide Gasparini; Daniele Di Spigno; 416 | Great Britain; Steven Scott; Tim Kneale; Matthew French; 405 | Germany; Andreas Löw; Michael Goldbrunner; Waldemar Schanz; 399 |
| Skeet (26.06) | Luigi Lodde; Italy | Efthimios Mitas; Greece | Riccardo Filippelli; Italy |
| Skeet (team) | Italy; Riccardo Filippelli; Tammaro Cassandro; Luigi Lodde; 367 | Cyprus; Andreas Chasikos; Georgios Achilleos; Anastasios Chapeshis; 362 | Germany; Ralf Buchheim; Sven Korte; Frank Cordesmeyer; 359 |

=== Women ===
| Event | 1st place, gold medalist(s) | 2nd place, silver medalist(s) | 3rd place, bronze medalist(s) |
|---|---|---|---|
| Trap (19.06) | Deborah Gelisio; Italy | Katrin Quooß; Germany | Zuzana Štefečeková; Slovakia |
| Trap (team) | Italy; Deborah Gelisio; Jessica Rossi; Federica Caporuscio; 204 pts. | Germany; Katrin Quooß; Christiane Göhring; Sonja Scheibl; 204 pts. | Great Britain; Abbey Burton; Kirsty Barr; Charlotte Kerwood; 202 pts. |
| Skeet (25.06) | Chiara Cainero; Italy | Véronique Girardet; France | Danka Barteková; Slovakia |
| Skeet (team) | Slovakia; Danka Barteková; Monika Stibrava; Andrea Stranovská; 208 | Italy; Chiara Cainero; Diana Bacosi; Katiuscia Spada; 207 | Great Britain; Amber Hill; Elena Allen; Sian Bruce; 204 |

=== Mixed ===
Note - exhibition event; no medals awarded

| Event | 1st place, gold medalist(s) | 2nd place, silver medalist(s) | 3rd place, bronze medalist(s) |
|---|---|---|---|
| Trap team (20.06) | Deborah Gelisio; Massimo Fabbrizi; Italy; 26 pts. | Zuzana Štefečeková; Roman Čavara; Slovakia; 20 pts. | Arianna Perilli; Manuel Mancini; San Marino; 19 pts. |

== Medal table ==
| # | Country | 1st place, gold medalist(s) | 2nd place, silver medalist(s) | 3rd place, bronze medalist(s) | Tot. |
|---|---|---|---|---|---|
| 1 | Italy | 7 | 2 | 2 | 11 |
| 2 | Great Britain | 1 | 1 | 2 | 4 |
| 3 | Slovakia | 1 | 0 | 2 | 3 |
| 4 | Austria | 1 | 0 | 0 | 1 |
| 5 | Germany | 0 | 2 | 2 | 4 |
| 6 | Cyprus | 0 | 1 | 0 | 1 |
| 6 | France | 0 | 1 | 0 | 1 |
| 6 | Greece | 0 | 1 | 0 | 1 |
| 6 | Poland | 0 | 1 | 0 | 1 |
| 6 | Russia | 0 | 1 | 0 | 1 |
| 11 | Croatia | 0 | 0 | 1 | 1 |
| 11 | Czech Republic | 0 | 0 | 1 | 1 |
| | TOTAL | 10 | 10 | 10 | 30 |

== See also ==
- Shotgun
- European Shooting Confederation
- International Shooting Sport Federation
