= Tsuranov =

Tsuranov (Russian: Цуранов) is a Russian masculine surname, its feminine counterpart is Tsuranova. It may refer to

- Konstantin Tsuranov (born 1972), Russian sport shooter
- Yury Tsuranov (1936–2008), Russia sports shooter, father of Konstantin
