= 2008 ISSF World Cup Final =

The 2008 ISSF World Cup Final was divided into two parts:

- 2008 ISSF World Cup Final (shotgun)
- 2008 ISSF World Cup Final (rifle and pistol)
