= Anders Golding =

Danish sport shooter (born 1984)

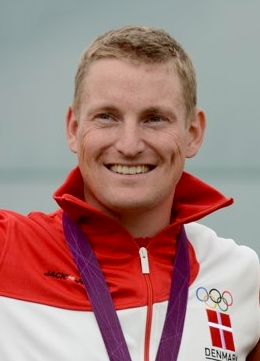
- Golding at the 2012 Olympics

Personal information
- Born: 12 May 1984 (age 42) Aalborg, Denmark
- Height: 186 cm (6 ft 1 in)
- Weight: 95 kg (209 lb)

Sport
- Sport: Shooting
- Event: Skeet
- Club: Jetsmark
Medal record
Representing Denmark
Olympic Games
Silver medal – second place	2012 London	Skeet

Anders Christian Golding (born 12 May 1984) is a Danish skeet shooter. He competed at the 2008 and 2012 Olympics and won a silver medal in 2012. This was Denmark's first medal at the 2012 Olympics and their first medal in the men's skeet since 1984. He finished behind American Vincent Hancock who took the gold medal for a second time. Golding is a carpenter by profession and lives in Oslo, Norway.

The medal scores in the 2012 Olympic final were Vincent Hancock 148/150, Anders Golding 146/150, and Nasser Al-Attiyah 144/150.

Golding was 25th in the qualification round at the 2008 Olympics.
