= Ariel Mauricio Flores =

Mexican sport shooter

Personal information
- Full name: Ariel Mauricio Flores Gómez
- Nationality: Mexico
- Born: 10 February 1977 (age 49) Ciudad Victoria, Tamaulipas, Mexico
- Height: 1.78 m (5 ft 10 in)
- Weight: 114 kg (251 lb)

Sport
- Sport: Shooting
- Event: Skeet
- Coached by: Guillermo Olivera
Medal record
Men's shooting
Representing Mexico
Pan American Games
Bronze medal – third place	2007 Rio de Janeiro	Skeet

Ariel Mauricio Flores Gómez (born February 10, 1977) is a Mexican sport shooter. He won a bronze medal in men's skeet shooting at the 2007 Pan American Games in Rio de Janeiro, Brazil, and gold at the 2008 ISSF World Cup series in Kerrville, Texas, accumulating scores of 144 and 147 targets, respectively.

Flores represented Mexico at the 2008 Summer Olympics in Beijing, where he competed in the men's skeet shooting. He finished only in twenty-seventh place by one point behind Guatemala's Juan Carlos Romero from the final attempt, for a total score of 111 targets.
