= Andrei Gerachtchenko =

Belarusian sport shooter

Personal information
- Nationality: Belarus
- Born: 29 April 1970 (age 56) Minsk, Belarusian SSR
- Height: 1.80 m (5 ft 11 in)
- Weight: 80 kg (176 lb)

Sport
- Sport: Shooting
- Event: Skeet

Andrei Gerachtchenko (Belarusian: Андрэй Герашчанка / Andrei Hiarashchanka; born April 29, 1970) is a Belarusian sport shooter. At age thirty-eight, Gerachtchenko made his official debut for the 2008 Summer Olympics in Beijing, where he competed in the men's skeet shooting. He finished only in thirty-fourth place by four points behind Greece's Georgios Salavantakis from the final attempt, for a total score of 109 targets.
