= Axel Wegner =

German sport shooter (born 1963)

Medal record

Men's shooting

Representing East Germany

Olympic Games
Gold medal – first place	1988 Seoul	Skeet

Axel Wegner (born 3 June 1963 in Demmin, Mecklenburg-Vorpommern) is a German sport shooter and Olympic champion. He won a gold medal in skeet shooting at the 1988 Summer Olympics in Seoul.

Olympic results
Event	1988	1992	1996	2000	2004	2008
Skeet (mixed)	(gold) Gold; 148+50+24	25th 145	Not held			
Skeet (men)	Not held		26th 118	—	31st 117	20th 115

World records held in Skeet from 2005 to 2012
Men	Teams	368	Germany (Wenzel, Wegner, Buchheim); Norway (Brovold, Undseth, Jensen)	August 12, 2011	Belgrade (SER)
