= Georgios Salavantakis =

Greek sport shooter

Personal information
- Nationality: Greece
- Born: 10 September 1970 (age 55) Chania, Crete, Greece
- Height: 1.80 m (5 ft 11 in)
- Weight: 77 kg (170 lb)

Sport
- Sport: Shooting
- Event: Skeet
- Club: SKOE
- Coached by: John Loverdos

Georgios Salavantakis (Greek: Γεώργιος Σαλαβαντάκης; born 10 September 1970 in Chania, Crete) is a Greek sport shooter. He won a gold medal in men's skeet shooting at the 2004 ISSF World Cup series in Sydney, Australia, with a total score of 148 points.

Salavantakis represented the host nation Greece at the 2004 Summer Olympics in Athens, where he placed twenty-first in men's skeet shooting, with a total score of 120 points, tying his position with seven other shooters, including former Olympic champion Ennio Falco of Italy, and five-time Olympian Guillermo Alfredo Torres of Cuba.

At the 2008 Summer Olympics in Beijing, Salavantakis competed for the second time, as a 38-year-old, in men's skeet shooting. He finished only in thirty-third place by one point behind Ukraine's Mikola Milchev from the final attempt, for a total score of 109 points.
