= List of flag bearers for Ukraine at the Olympics =

Ukraine at the Olympics
- IOC code: UKR
- NOC: National Olympic Committee of Ukraine
- Website: www.noc-ukr.org (in Ukrainian and English)
- Medals: Gold 41 Silver 43 Bronze 76 Total 160

Summer appearances
- 1996; 2000; 2004; 2008; 2012; 2016; 2020; 2024

Winter appearances
- 1994; 1998; 2002; 2006; 2010; 2014; 2018; 2022; 2026

Other related appearances
- Austria (1896–1912); Hungary (1896–1912); Russian Empire (1900–1912); Czechoslovakia (1920–1936); Poland (1924–1936); Romania (1924–1936); Soviet Union (1952–1988); Unified Team (1992)

This is a list of flag bearers who have represented Ukraine at the Olympics. Flag bearers carry the national flag of their country at the opening ceremony of the Olympic Games.

Before the 2020 Summer Olympics, it was said in Ukraine that there was "curse of flag bearers" because flag bearers had never won a medal at the Games at which they had been carrying the national flag. Olena Kostevych was the first one to debunk that myth after winning bronze in mixed 10 metre air pistol team event.

#	Event year	Season	Flag bearer	Sport
1	1994	Winter	Viktor Petrenko	Figure skating
2	1996	Summer	Sergey Bubka	Athletics
3	1998	Winter	Andriy Deryzemlya	Biathlon
4	2000	Summer	Yevhen Braslavets	Sailing
5	2002	Winter	Olena Petrova	Biathlon
6	2004	Summer	Denys Sylantyev	Swimming
7	2006	Winter	Natalia Yakushenko	Luge
8	2008	Summer	Yana Klochkova	Swimming (did not compete)
9	2010	Winter	Liliya Ludan	Luge
10	2012	Summer	Roman Hontyuk	Judo
11	2014	Winter	Valentyna Shevchenko	Cross-country skiing
12	2016	Summer	Mykola Milchev	Shooting
13	2018	Winter	Olena Pidhrushna	Biathlon (did not compete)
14	2020	Summer	Olena Kostevych	Shooting
14	2020	Summer	Bohdan Nikishyn	Fencing
15	2022	Winter	Oleksandr Abramenko	Freestyle skiing
15	2022	Winter	Oleksandra Nazarova	Figure skating
16	2024	Summer	Mykhailo Romanchuk	Swimming
16	2024	Summer	Elina Svitolina	Tennis

== See also ==
- Ukraine at the Olympics
