= Antonakis Andreou =

Cypriot sport shooter (born 1974)

Personal information
- Nationality: Cypriot
- Born: 1974 (age 51–52) Dhekelia, Cyprus
- Height: 174 cm (5 ft 9 in)
- Weight: 70 kg (150 lb)

Sport
- Country: Cyprus
- Sport: Shooting
- Event: Skeet
Medal record
Men's shooting
Commonwealth Games
Gold medal – first place	Victoria 1994	Skeet pairs

Antonakis Andreou (Greek: Αντωνάκης Ανδρεου) often called Antonis Andreou, is a Cypriot sport shooter. He has represented Cyprus in the 1996 Summer Olympics ranking 9th and the 2000 Summer Olympics ranking 8th. He represented Cyprus at the 2012 Summer Olympics in London, finishing in 22nd.

He won a gold medal for Cyprus at the 1994 Commonwealth Games in Skeet pairs.

He was the flag bearer for Cyprus at the 2000 Summer Olympics in Sydney.

In 2011 he equaled the world record and claimed the gold medal at the ISSF Shotgun World Cup in Beijing, China.

== Records ==
World records held in Skeet from 2005 to 2012
Men	Qualification	125	Vincent Hancock (USA); Tore Brovold (NOR); Mykola Milchev (UKR); Jan Sychra (CZE); Tore Brovold (NOR); Jan Sychra (CZE); Antonakis Andreou (CYP); Juan José Aramburu (ESP); Nasser Al-Attiyah (QAT); Anthony Terras (FRA); Efthimios Mitas (GRE)	14 June 2007; 13 July 2008; 9 May 2009; 20 May 2009; 25 July 2009; 7 March 2011; 22 April 2011; 13 September 2011; 17 January 2012; 26 March 2012; 26 March 2012	Lonato (ITA); Nicosia (CYP); Cairo (EGY); Munich (GER); Osijek (CRO); Concepción (CHI); Beijing (CHN); Belgrade (SER); Doha (QAT); Tucson (USA); Tucson (USA)
