= Camillo Tarello =

Venetian agronomist (c. 1513–1573)

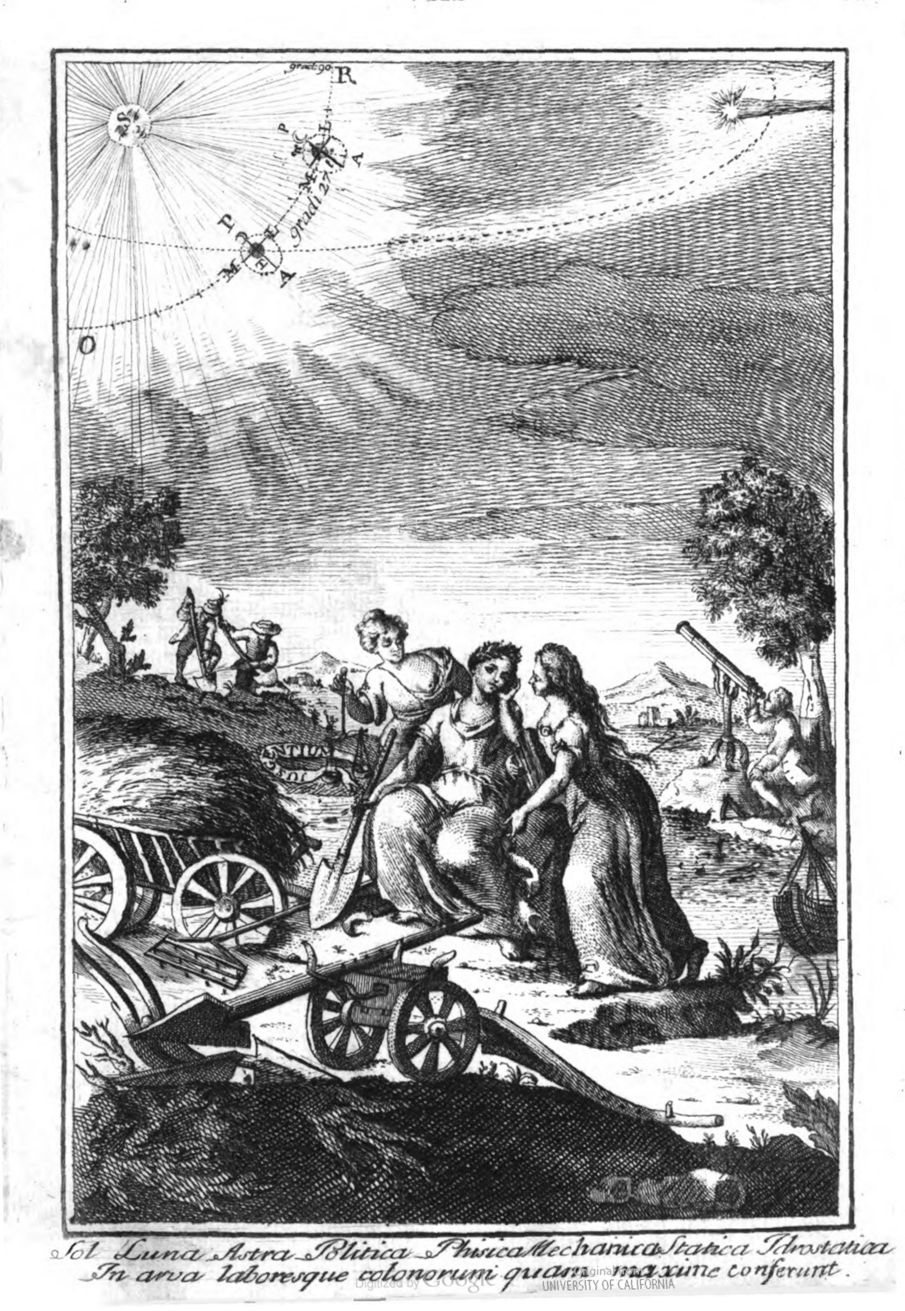
Ricordo d'agricoltura di M. Camillo Tarello, title plate, 1567.

Camillo Tarello (c. 1513 – 1573) was a Venetian agronomist, known as author of Ricordo d'agricoltura di M. Camillo Tarello, and for his patent of a new system in agriculture based on crop rotation granted by the Venetian Senate in 1566.

== Life and work ==
Camillo Tarello, a native of Lonato del Garda, in the Venetian territories, concerned to see the neglected and dreadful mismanaged state of husbandry in his country, wrote his small, but highly valuable treatise of Agriculture, and presented it to the Senate of Venice under the title of Ricordo es Agricultura. The Senate, in justice to the excellency of this work and the patriotic intentions of its author, granted him, on 29 September 1566, not only the sole right of vending his book, but also ordered at the same time that all such as adopted his new method of husbandry, should pay to him, and afterwards to his descendants, four marchetti (about three halfpence of the 18th century) for every acre of corn land, and two marchetti for every acre of other land, planted according to his direction.

Tarello and another agronomist from Brescia, Agostino Gallo, promoted the use of clover as a fodder. In Ricordo d'agricoltura he explained:

"Clover is an excellent fodder, not just as Pliny says, but as experience shows. Its roots benefit the soil by making it rich no less than grass benefits animals by nourishing them. That is why people from Brescia sow clover where they later intend to grow flax, which exhausts the soil a great deal... If one wishes to sow this crop, one should initially buy the seed in Brescia or some other place where it is to be found."

In the antiquity clover had been of secondary importance as manner. Its domestication had been described by Albertus Magnus in De vegitabilibus, around 1270, but the campaign of Gallo and Tarello around 1550 made it popular.

== Reception ==
Tarello's work became an import reference in early modern agricultural theory. In the early 19th century, for example, Albrecht Thaer claimed that in Mecklenburg there was complete ignorance of Camillo Tarello's method of not burying the dung until the last sowing, or of even spreading it over the new turf. In fact, the adoption of this plan, according to which the manure is only applied to the soil as a kind of capital, is perhaps considered to produce too great a diminution in the corn harvests, although the loss in that point will, in the end, be thoroughly compensated by the increased richness of the pasturage, and by the abundance of the produce which will be obtained when the ground is cultivated again.

Thaer further explained:

Latterly, the practice of sowing white clover with the last crop has become very general: only a few apathetic and indolent agriculturists, or men who are firmly wedded to old opinions and customs, neglect this practice, and consider natural herbage to be quite as efficient and beneficial for the nourishment of cattle; but cow-keepers and dairy farmers are, almost invariably, great advocates of this practice, and their opinion ought to possess some weight.
It makes a very great difference in the pasturage of the first year, and the effects are even sometimes perceptible on that of the second and third. The produce of the pasturage ought to be valued both according to the nature of the sou and the greater or less disposition which it shows towards the bearing of grass, as well as according to the period which has elapsed since it has been without cultivation.

And according to Thaer (1844), the testimony of a great many aged persons goes to prove that a wide extent of land, which had been wholly exhausted by the triennial rotation, has become so much ameliorated by this system of cultivation in the course of one generation, that it is now capable of producing a considerable surplus of corn for exportation, besides affording an abundant pasturage to three times as many cattle as were formerly fed upon it.

== Publications ==
- Tarello, Camillo. Ricordo d'agricoltura di M. Camillo Tarello da Lonato. Al serenissimo Principe di Venetia, & alla illustrissima Republica Venetiana. appresso Ghirardo Imberti, 1567.

About Camillo Tarello

- Ambrosoli, Mauro. The Wild and the Sown: Botany and Agriculture in Western Europe, 1350-1850, 1997
- Dannenfeldt, Karl H. "The control of vertebrate pests in Renaissance agriculture." Agricultural History (1982): 542–559.
- Poni, Carlo. "Un" privilegio" d'agricoltura: Camillo Tarello e il Senato di Venezia." Rivista Storica Italiana 82 (1970): 592–610.
