= Efthimios Mitas =

Greek sport shooter (born 1985)

Personal information
- Nationality: Greek
- Born: 15 May 1985 (age 41)

Sport
- Sport: Sports shooting
Medal record
Representing Greece
World Championships
Gold medal – first place	2023 Baku	Skeet
European Championships
Silver medal – second place	2012 Larnaca	Skeet
Silver medal – second place	2014 Sarlóspuszta	Skeet
Silver medal – second place	2015 Maribor	Skeet
Silver medal – second place	2022 Larnaca	Skeet team
Silver medal – second place	2024 Lonato	Mixed team skeet

Efthimios Mitas (born 15 May 1985) is a Greek sport shooter. At the 2012 Summer Olympics, he competed in the Men's skeet, finishing in 25th place. At the 2016 Summer Olympics, he took the 13th place at the same event.

== Records ==
World records held in Skeet from 2005 to 2012
Men	Qualification	125	Vincent Hancock (USA); Tore Brovold (NOR); Mykola Milchev (UKR); Jan Sychra (CZE); Tore Brovold (NOR); Jan Sychra (CZE); Antonakis Andreou (CYP); Juan José Aramburu (ESP); Nasser Al-Attiyah (QAT); Anthony Terras (FRA); Efthimios Mitas (GRE)	14 June 2007; 13 July 2008; 9 May 2009; 20 May 2009; 25 July 2009; 7 March 2011; 22 April 2011; 13 September 2011; 17 January 2012; 26 March 2012; 26 March 2012	Lonato (ITA); Nicosia (CYP); Cairo (EGY); Munich (GER); Osijek (CRO); Concepción (CHI); Beijing (CHN); Belgrade (SER); Doha (QAT); Tucson (USA); Tucson (USA)
Men	Final	150	Vincent Hancock (USA) (125+25); Tore Brovold (NOR) (125+25); Tore Brovold (NOR) (125+25); Jan Sychra (CZE) (125+25); Nasser Al-Attiyah (QAT) (125+25); Efthimios Mitas (GRE) (125+25)	14 June 2007; 13 July 2008; 25 July 2009; 7 March 2011; 17 January 2012; 26 March 2012	Lonato (ITA); Nicosia (CYP); Osijek (CRO); Concepción (CHI); Doha (QAT); Tucson (USA)
