= Fabio Ramella =

Swiss sport shooter

Fabio Ramella is a Swiss sport shooter. At the 2012 Summer Olympics he competed in the Men's skeet, finishing in 34th place.
