= Theresa DeWitt =

American sport shooter

Theresa E. "Terry" DeWitt (born 15 April 1963 in Fort Bragg, North Carolina) is an American former sport shooter who competed in the 1996 Summer Olympics.
