= Tore Brovold =

Norwegian sport shooter (born 1970)

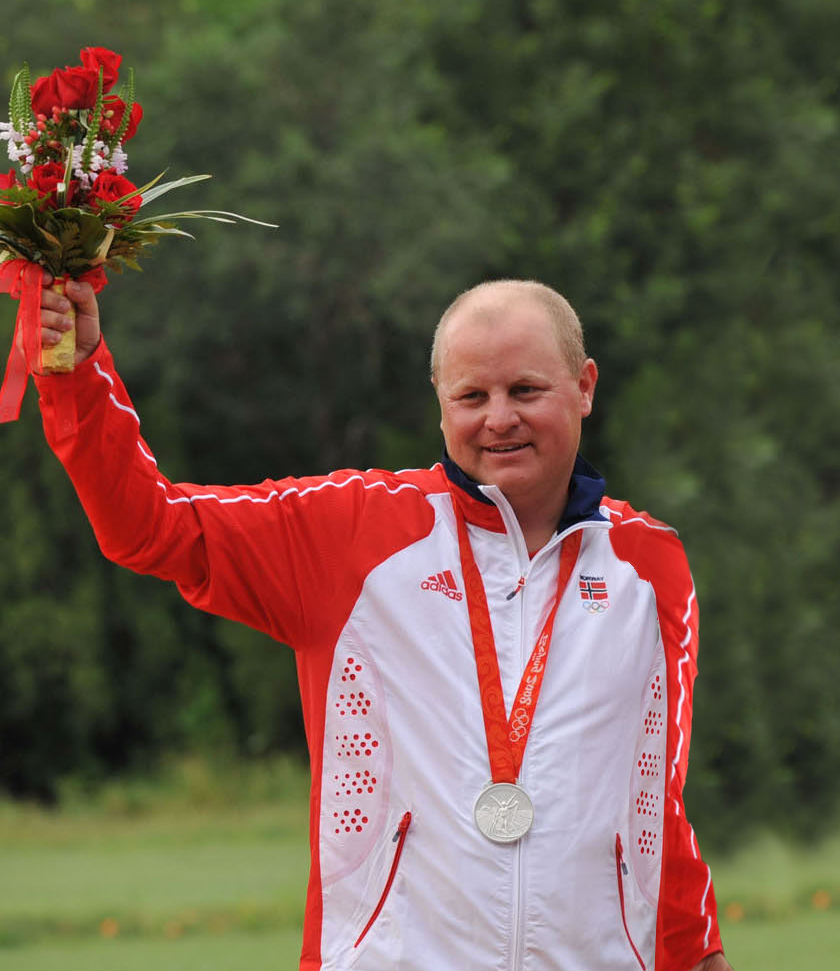
- Tore Brovold winning the silver medal at the 2008 Summer Olympics

Medal record

Representing Norway

Men's shooting

Olympic Games
Silver medal – second place	2008 Beijing	Skeet

ISSF World Shooting Championships
Gold medal – first place	2005 Lonato	Skeet - team
Bronze medal – third place	2006 Zagreb	Skeet
Bronze medal – third place	2006 Zagreb	Skeet - team
Silver medal – second place	2011 Belgrade	Skeet

Tore Brovold (born 12 June 1970) is a Norwegian sport shooter competing in Skeet. Brovold was one of the Norwegian athletes competing in the 2008 Summer Olympics in Beijing, where he won a silver medal. Later the same year, he won the 2008 ISSF World Cup Final.

Brovold started shooting in 1977, when he was only 7 years, and participated in his first competition two years later. He began skeet shooting in 1996.

== World records ==
World records held in Skeet from 2005 to 2012
Men	Qualification	125	Vincent Hancock (USA); Tore Brovold (NOR); Mykola Milchev (UKR); Jan Sychra (CZE); Tore Brovold (NOR); Jan Sychra (CZE); Antonakis Andreou (CYP); Juan José Aramburu (ESP); Nasser Al-Attiyah (QAT); Anthony Terras (FRA); Efthimios Mitas (GRE)	14 June 2007; 13 July 2008; 9 May 2009; 20 May 2009; 25 July 2009; 7 March 2011; 22 April 2011; 13 September 2011; 17 January 2012; 26 March 2012; 26 March 2012	Lonato (ITA); Nicosia (CYP); Cairo (EGY); Munich (GER); Osijek (CRO); Concepción (CHI); Beijing (CHN); Belgrade (SER); Doha (QAT); Tucson (USA); Tucson (USA)
Men	Final	150	Vincent Hancock (USA) (125+25); Tore Brovold (NOR) (125+25); Tore Brovold (NOR) (125+25); Jan Sychra (CZE) (125+25); Nasser Al-Attiyah (QAT) (125+25); Efthimios Mitas (GRE) (125+25)	14 June 2007; 13 July 2008; 25 July 2009; 7 March 2011; 17 January 2012; 26 March 2012	Lonato (ITA); Nicosia (CYP); Osijek (CRO); Concepción (CHI); Doha (QAT); Tucson (USA)
Men	Teams	368	Germany (Wenzel, Wegner, Buchheim); Norway (Brovold, Undseth, Jensen)	August 12, 2011	Belgrade (SER)

== Trainer ==
Tore Brovold is currently training the danish skeet shooter Jesper Hansen, who is going to the Olympics in Tokyo in 2021. Tore Brovold has been the trainer of the Indian Skeet Shooters Mairaj Ahmad Khan, Gurjoat Siingh Khangura and Angad Vir Singh Bajwa.
