= Emmanuel Petit (sport shooter) =

French sport shooter

Personal information
- Nationality: French
- Born: 4 December 1972 (age 53) La Rochelle, France
- Height: 1.84 m (6 ft 0 in)
- Weight: 86 kg (190 lb)

Sport
- Country: France
- Sport: Shooting
- Event: Skeet
- Club: Association Tir Plateaux Police
Medal record
World Championships
Gold medal – first place	2018 Changwon	Skeet team
Mediterranean Games
Gold medal – first place	2022 Oran	Skeet mixed team

Emmanuel Petit (born 4 December 1972) is a French sport shooter.

He participated at the 2018 ISSF World Shooting Championships, winning a medal.
