= Stefan Nilsson (sport shooter) =

Swedish sport shooter (born 1990)

Personal information
- Nationality: Swedish
- Born: 12 August 1990 (age 35)

Sport
- Country: Sweden
- Sport: Shooting
Medal record
Men's shooting
Representing Sweden
World Championships
Gold medal – first place	2019 Lonato del Garda	Skeet team
European Games
Gold medal – first place	2019 Minsk	Skeet
Silver medal – second place	2015 Baku	Skeet
European Championships
Bronze medal – third place	2017 Baku	Skeet
Bronze medal – third place	2017 Baku	Skeet team

Stefan Nilsson (born 12 August 1990) is a Swedish sport shooter. At the 2012 Summer Olympics he competed in the Men's skeet, finishing in 15th place. He competed in the same event again at the 2016 Summer Olympics, finishing 5th.

He qualified to represent Sweden at the 2020 Summer Olympics in the Men's skeet and has been announced to do the same at the 2024 Summer Olympics.
