= Juan José Aramburu =

Spanish sport shooter

Medal record

Men's shooting

Representing Spain

ISSF World Championships
Gold medal – first place	2011 Belgrade	Skeet

Juan José Aramburu Amorena (Note: In this Spanish name, the first or paternal surname is Aramburu and the second or maternal family name is Amorena.) (born 13 October 1981 in Irun) is an Olympic skeet shooter. At the 2008 Summer Olympics he finished eighth in his event so did not advance to the final. Later he won a gold medal at the 2011 Skeet shooting World Championships in Belgrade. At the 2012 Summer Olympics, Aramburu again competed in the men's skeet but did not advance to the final.

== Records ==
World records held in Skeet from 2005 to 2012
Men	Qualification	125	Vincent Hancock (USA); Tore Brovold (NOR); Mykola Milchev (UKR); Jan Sychra (CZE); Tore Brovold (NOR); Jan Sychra (CZE); Antonakis Andreou (CYP); Juan José Aramburu (ESP); Nasser Al-Attiyah (QAT); Anthony Terras (FRA); Efthimios Mitas (GRE)	14 June 2007; 13 July 2008; 9 May 2009; 20 May 2009; 25 July 2009; 7 March 2011; 22 April 2011; 13 September 2011; 17 January 2012; 26 March 2012; 26 March 2012	Lonato (ITA); Nicosia (CYP); Cairo (EGY); Munich (GER); Osijek (CRO); Concepción (CHI); Beijing (CHN); Belgrade (SER); Doha (QAT); Tucson (USA); Tucson (USA)
