= Jan Sychra =

Czech sport shooter (born 1969)

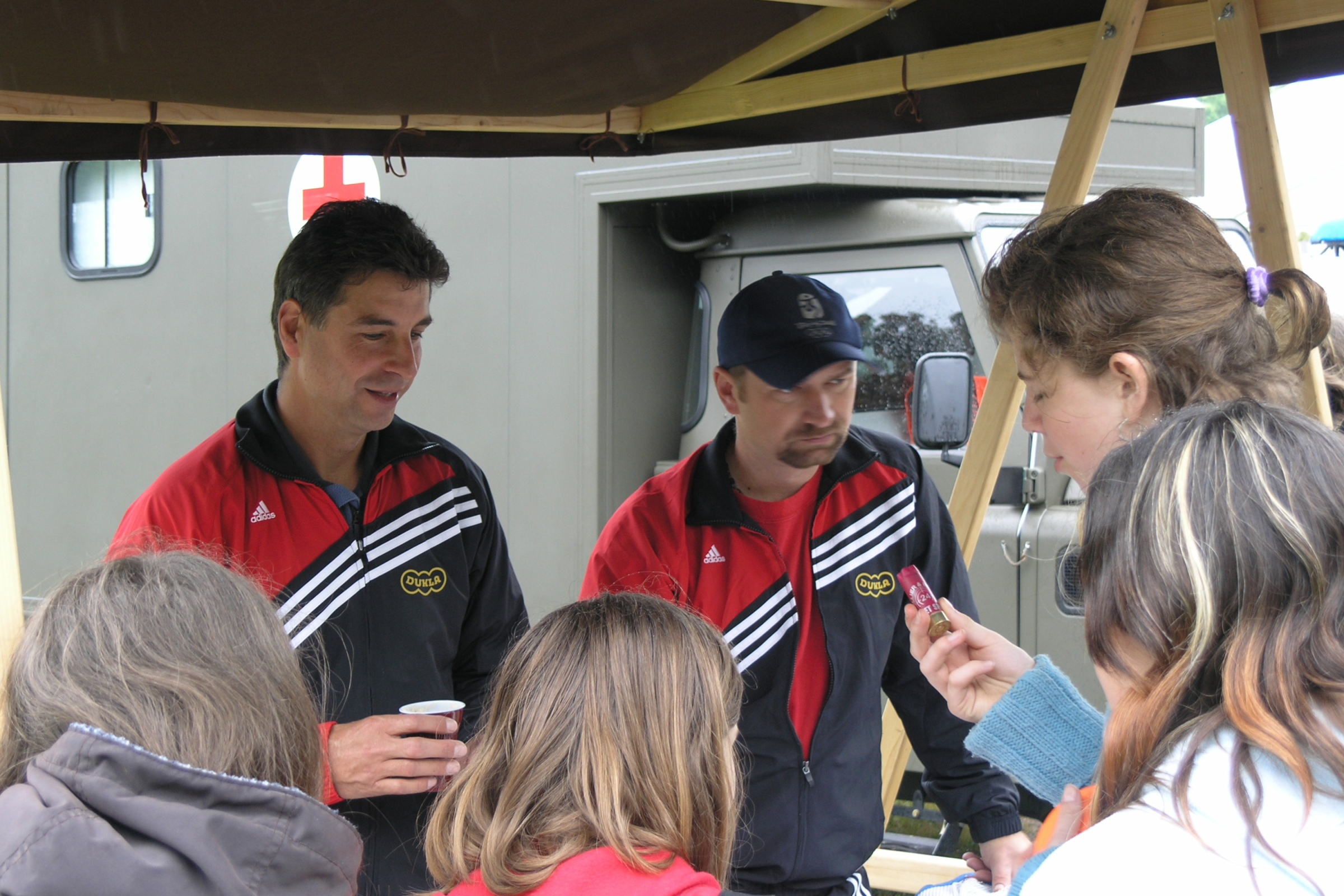
- Sychra (right) in 2008.

Personal information
- Nationality: Czech Republic
- Born: 21 March 1969 (age 56); Brno, Czechoslovakia
- Website: www.jan-sychra.com

Sport
- Sport: Shooting
- Event: Skeet
- Club: ASC Dukla Hradec Králové

Jan Sychra (Czech pronunciation: [ˈjan ˈsɪxra]; born 21 March 1969) is a Czech sport shooter. At the 2012 Summer Olympics he competed in the Men's skeet, finishing in 5th place.

== Records ==
World records held in Skeet from 2005 to 2012
Men	Qualification	125	Vincent Hancock (USA); Tore Brovold (NOR); Mykola Milchev (UKR); Jan Sychra (CZE); Tore Brovold (NOR); Jan Sychra (CZE); Antonakis Andreou (CYP); Juan José Aramburu (ESP); Nasser Al-Attiyah (QAT); Anthony Terras (FRA); Efthimios Mitas (GRE)	14 June 2007; 13 July 2008; 9 May 2009; 20 May 2009; 25 July 2009; 7 March 2011; 22 April 2011; 13 September 2011; 17 January 2012; 26 March 2012; 26 March 2012	Lonato (ITA); Nicosia (CYP); Cairo (EGY); Munich (GER); Osijek (CRO); Concepción (CHI); Beijing (CHN); Belgrade (SER); Doha (QAT); Tucson (USA); Tucson (USA)
Men	Final	150	Vincent Hancock (USA) (125+25); Tore Brovold (NOR) (125+25); Tore Brovold (NOR) (125+25); Jan Sychra (CZE) (125+25); Nasser Al-Attiyah (QAT) (125+25); Efthimios Mitas (GRE) (125+25)	14 June 2007; 13 July 2008; 25 July 2009; 7 March 2011; 17 January 2012; 26 March 2012	Lonato (ITA); Nicosia (CYP); Osijek (CRO); Concepción (CHI); Doha (QAT); Tucson (USA)
