= Mykola Milchev =

Ukrainian sport shooter (born 1967)

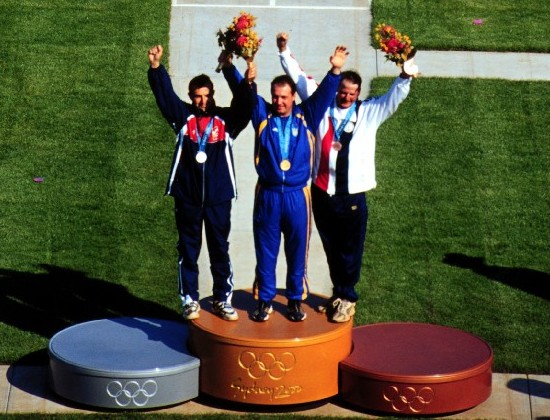
- Milchev (center) at the 2000 Olympics

Medal record

Men's shooting

Representing Ukraine

Olympic Games
Gold medal – first place	2000 Sydney	Skeet

World Championships
Silver medal – second place	2023 Baku	Team mixed skeet

European Championships
Gold medal – first place	1999 Pousan	Skeet
Silver medal – second place	2026 Athens	Skeet
Bronze medal – third place	2025 Chateauroux	Skeet

Mykola Mykolayovych Milchev (Ukrainian: Микола Миколайович Мільчев, born 3 November 1967) is a Ukrainian sport shooter. He is the 2000 Olympic champion in skeet shooting. With a perfect score of 150, he set an Olympic record and tied the world record.

== Career ==
Milchev won gold at the 2000 Summer Olympics in Sydney, Australia. The skeet rules were changed in 2005, removing the old world records, but in May 2009 at the ISSF World Cup in Cairo, he once again achieved a perfect qualification score of 125 to equal the world record.

Milchev served as Ukraine's flagbearer at the 2016 Summer Olympics in Rio de Janeiro.

Milchev won a bronze medal at the 2025 European Championships in Chateroux.

World records held in Skeet from 2005 to 2012
Men	Qualification	125	Vincent Hancock (USA); Tore Brovold (NOR); Mykola Milchev (UKR); Jan Sychra (CZE); Tore Brovold (NOR); Jan Sychra (CZE); Antonakis Andreou (CYP); Juan José Aramburu (ESP); Nasser Al-Attiyah (QAT); Anthony Terras (FRA); Efthimios Mitas (GRE)	14 June 2007; 13 July 2008; 9 May 2009; 20 May 2009; 25 July 2009; 7 March 2011; 22 April 2011; 13 September 2011; 17 January 2012; 26 March 2012; 26 March 2012	Lonato (ITA); Nicosia (CYP); Cairo (EGY); Munich (GER); Osijek (CRO); Concepción (CHI); Beijing (CHN); Belgrade (SER); Doha (QAT); Tucson (USA); Tucson (USA)

Olympic Games
Preceded by Roman Hontyuk	Flagbearer for Ukraine; Rio de Janeiro 2016	Succeeded by Olena Kostevych & Bohdan Nikishyn
