= Konstantin Tsuranov =

Russian sport shooter

Personal information
- Full name: Konstantin Yuryevich Tsuranov
- Nationality: Russia
- Born: 21 August 1972 (age 53) Rostov-on-Don, Russian SFSR
- Height: 1.78 m (5 ft 10 in)
- Weight: 98 kg (216 lb)

Sport
- Sport: Shooting
- Event: Skeet

Konstantin Yuryevich Tsuranov (Russian: Константин Юрьевич Цуранов; born August 21, 1972, in Rostov-on-Don) is a Russian sport shooter. He won a silver medal in men's skeet shooting at the first meet of the 2008 ISSF World Cup in Beijing, with a total hit of 143 targets. He is also the son of Yury Tsuranov, who competed in the same category at three Olympic games (1968 in Mexico City, 1972 in Munich, and 1976 in Montreal), representing the Soviet Union.

Tsuranov represented Russia at the 2008 Summer Olympics in Beijing, where he competed in the men's skeet shooting, along with his teammate Valeriy Shomin. He finished only in twenty-third place by one point ahead of Italy's Andrea Benelli from the final attempt, for a total score of 113 targets in the two-day qualifying rounds.
