= Luigi Lodde =

Italian sports shooter (born 1980)

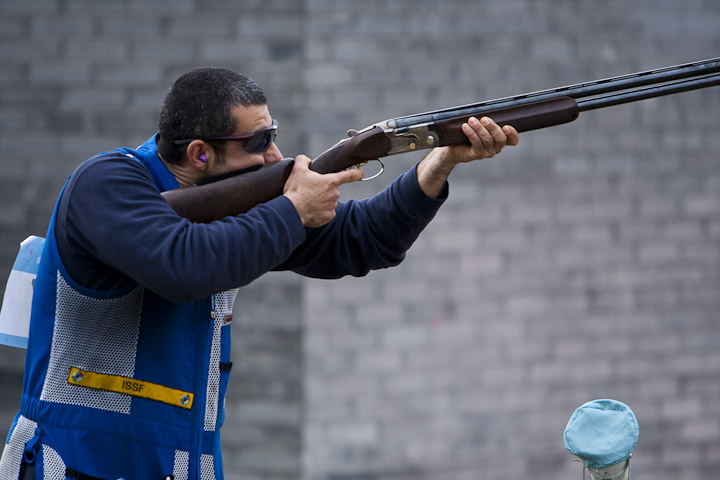
- Lodde in 2010

Personal information
- National team: Italy
- Born: 19 April 1980 (age 46) Sassari, Italy
- Height: 1.70 m (5 ft 7 in)
- Weight: 77 kg (170 lb)

Sport
- Sport: Shooting
- Event: Skeet
- Club: C.S. Esercito
- Start activity: 1996
- Coached by: Malasomma Gianpiero
Medal record
Individual
Event	1st	2nd	3rd
European Championships	2	1	2
World Cup Final	1	0	0
World Cup	2	0	1
Mediterranean Games	1	0	0
Total	6	1	3
Team
Event	1st	2nd	3rd
World Championships	2	1	0
European Championships	1	0	1
Total	3	1	1

Luigi Lodde (born 19 April 1980) is an Italian sport shooter. At the 2012 Summer Olympics he competed in the Men's skeet, finishing in 5th place.

== See also ==
- Skeet World Record holder
