= Ralf Buchheim =

German sport shooter (born 1983)

Ralf Buchheim (born 10 October 1983 in Lebus) is a German sport shooter. At the 2012 Summer Olympics he competed in the Men's skeet, finishing in 10th place. The sports shooter Michael Buchheim is his father.

World records held in Skeet from 2005 to 2012
Men	Teams	368	Germany (Wenzel, Wegner, Buchheim); Norway (Brovold, Undseth, Jensen)	August 12, 2011	Belgrade (SER)
