= Riccardo Filippelli =

Italian sport shooter

Personal information
- Nationality: Italian
- Born: 4 July 1980 (age 45)

Sport
- Country: Italy
- Sport: Shooting
- Event: Skeet
- Club: C.S. Carabinieri; G.S. Esercito
- Coached by: Andrea Benelli
- Now coaching: Maheshwari Chauhan
Medal record
Individual
Event	1st	2nd	3rd
World Championships	0	0	1
European Championships	1	0	1
Total	1	0	2
Team
Event	1st	2nd	3rd
World Championships	2	1	1
European Games	0	1	0
Total	2	2	1

Riccardo Filippelli (born 4 July 1980) is an Italian sport shooter, who participated at the 2018 ISSF World Shooting Championships, winning a medal.

== Achievements ==
Medal	Competition	Event
World Championships
Gold medal – first place	2014 Granada	Skeet team
Gold medal – first place	2017 Moscow	Skeet team
Silver medal – second place	2018 Changwon	Skeet team
Bronze medal – third place	2018 Changwon	Skeet
Bronze medal – third place	2019 Lonato del Garda	Skeet team
European Games
Silver medal – second place	2019 Minsk	Mixed skeet pairs
European Championships
Gold medal – first place	2016 Lonato del Garda	Skeet
Bronze medal – third place	2014 Sarlóspuszta	Skeet
