= Lonato del Garda =

Municipality in Lombardy, Italy

Lonato del Garda Lunà or Lonat (Lombard)
- Comune
- Comune di Lonato del Garda
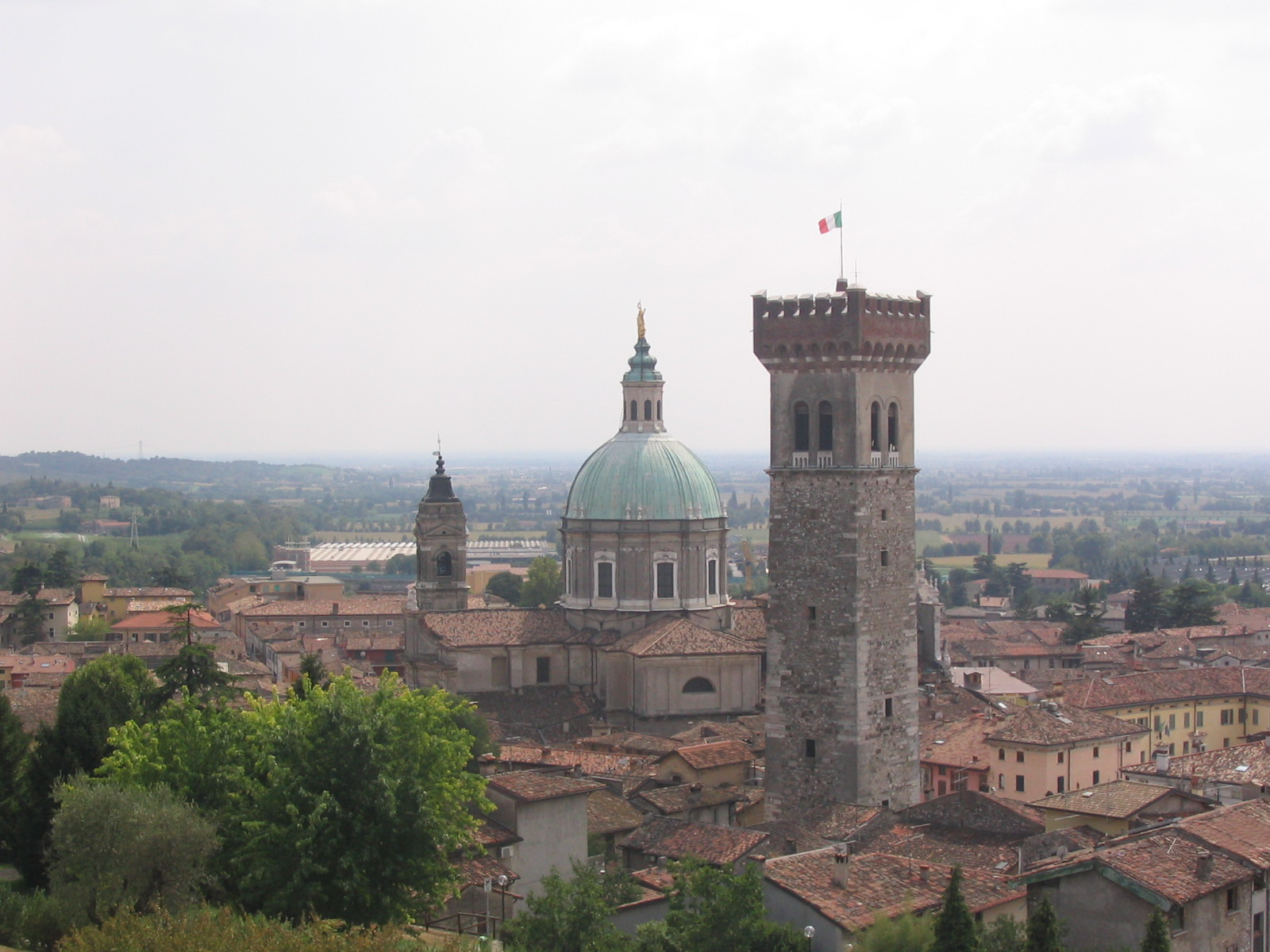
- View of the old town

- Coat of arms

- Location within Italy Location within Lombardy
- Coordinates: 45°27′40″N 10°29′04″E
- Country: Italy
- Region: Lombardy
- Province: Brescia (BS)
- Frazioni: Esenta, Sedena, Malocco, Castelvenzago, Campagna, Barcuzzi, Lido, Madonna della Scoperta, Centenaro

Government
  - Mayor: Nicola Bianchi (Lega)

Area
  - Total: 70 km^{2} (27 sq mi)
- Elevation: 188 m (617 ft)

Population (30 November 2017)
  - Total: 16,507
  - Density: 240/km^{2} (610/sq mi)
- Demonym: Lonatesi
- Time zone: UTC+1 (CET)
  - Summer (DST): UTC+2 (CEST)
- Postal code: 25017
- Dialing code: 030
- Patron saint: John the Baptist
- Saint day: 24 June
- Website: Official website

Lonato del Garda (before 1 July 2007 simply Lonato; Eastern Lombard: Lunà or Lonat, locally [luˈna(t)]) is a town and municipality (Italian: comune) in the province of Brescia, in Lombardy, northern Italy. Lonato is located about halfway between Milan and Venice, on the southwest shore of Lake Garda, the biggest lake in Italy.

Neighbouring communities are Castiglione delle Stiviere, Desenzano del Garda, Calcinato, Bedizzole, Calvagese della Riviera, Padenghe sul Garda, Pozzolengo, Montichiari, and Solferino. The town is a holiday destination due to its scenic lakeside location about 5 kilometres (3 mi) from the lake and its numerous historical and artistic monuments and museums, prehistoric sites (pile dwellings), Roman ruins, Medieval castle, Baroque churches and modern museums.

== History ==
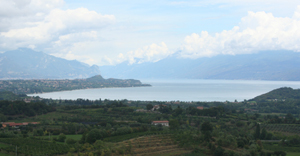
Lake Garda from Lonato

The area of Lonato del Garda, located on the morainic hills southwest of Lake Garda, has been inhabited since the Bronze Age. Early human settlements were established on pile dwellings (palafitte), as confirmed by archaeological discoveries in the peat bogs of Polada, Lavagnone, and Palude Lunga. These sites belong to the Polada culture, widespread across northern Italy around 1800 BCE, which takes its name from the Polada locality between Lonato and Menasasso.

During the Roman Empire, Lonato was traversed by the Via Emilia, a strategic Roman road linking Gaul to Aquileia. Traces of Roman settlements have been found in Monte Mario and Pozze, including ceramic fragments and kiln remains.

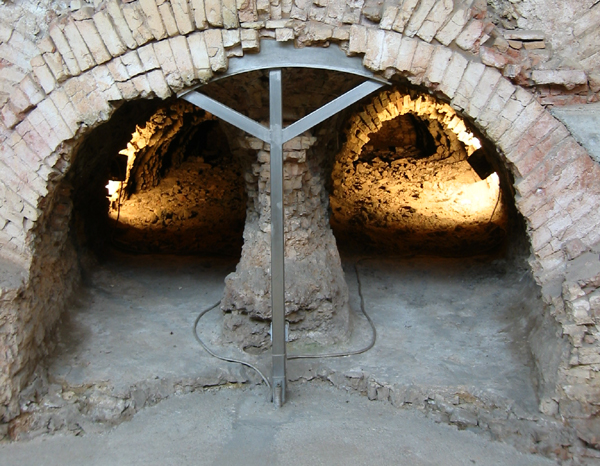
Remains of Roman kilns in Lonato

In 909, Lonato was destroyed during raids by Hungarian forces, as recorded in a diploma issued by Emperor Berengar I of Italy. It was later rebuilt and fortified. Throughout the medieval period, Lonato changed hands many times. Initially under the Municipium of Verona, it became a fortified outpost, contested among regional powers.

During the 13th and 14th centuries, Lonato del Garda fell under the dominion of the Scaligeri, the ruling family of Verona. At the height of their territorial expansion under Mastino II della Scala (r. 1329–1351), the Scaligeri extended their influence westward beyond Brescia, incorporating much of the Lake Garda hinterland, including strategic market towns and fortified sites such as Lonato. The Scaliger control over the region was marked by the imposition of Veronese military governance and taxation systems, often administered through castellan appointees. This period of rule brought the town into the political and cultural sphere of the Lordship of Verona, until Lonato was later absorbed into the Republic of Venice following the decline of Scaliger power in 1387.

Coat of arms of the Scaligeri, Lords of Verona (1262–1387)

In 1412, the town came under the control of the House of Gonzaga, who confirmed the status of “city” previously granted by Beatrice della Scala. The Gonzaga ruled until 1440, when Lonato was annexed by the Republic of Venice. Following the Venetian defeat at the Battle of Agnadello in 1509, the French temporarily took control. In 1512, Louis XII of France established his headquarters in Lonato during the Italian Wars. The Gonzaga briefly returned, but in 1516 the town was restored to Venice under the terms of the Treaty of Noyon.

In 1527, Cardinal Scaramuccia Trivulzio, bishop of the Diocese of Como, died in the Abbey of Maguzzano.

In 1722, the town codified its civil and criminal regulations in a collection titled Statuta civilia, et criminalia communitatis Leonati, which documented local governance during the Venetian period.

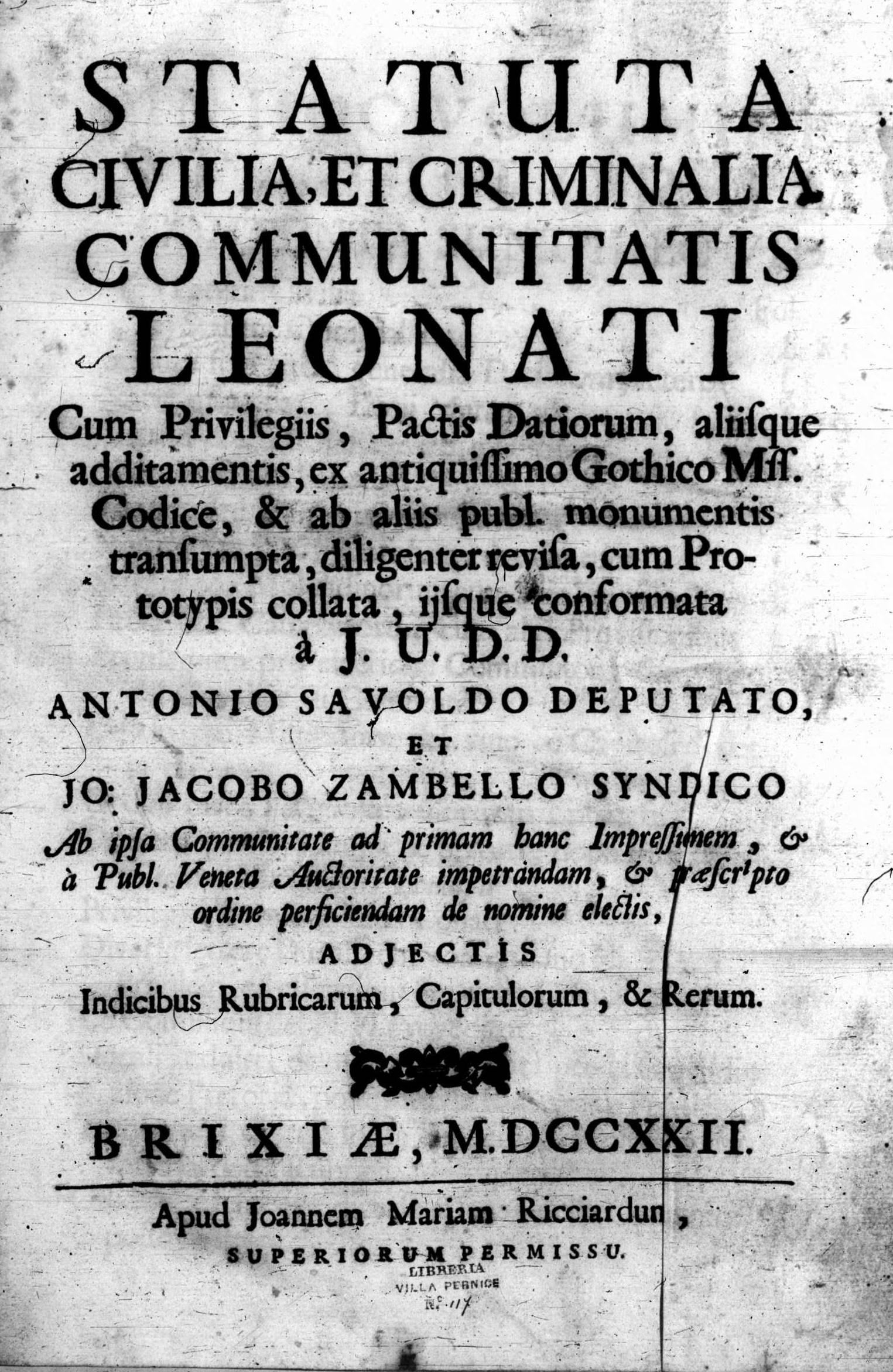
Statuta civilia et criminalia communitatis Leonati, 1722

Between 3 and 4 August 1796, the Battle of Lonato took place during Napoleon Bonaparte’s first Italian campaign. French troops defeated the Austrians led by Field Marshal Peter Vitus von Quosdanovich. The next day saw further fighting at the Battle of Castiglione.

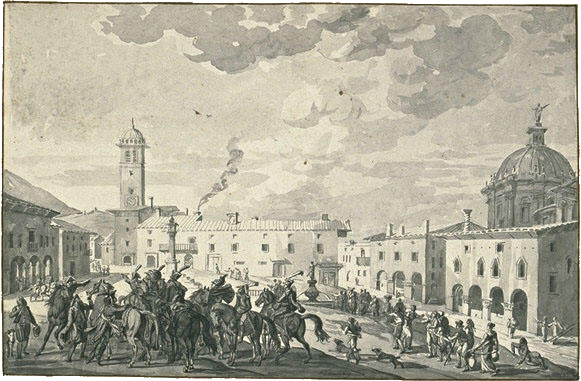
Napoleon entering Lonato – print by Nicolas-Antoine Taunay

In June 1859, after Franco-Piedmontese forces defeated the Austrians at Madonna della Scoperta during the Second Italian War of Independence, Lonato was annexed into the Kingdom of Italy.

During World War I, Lonato formed part of the “basso Garda” defensive line, with military installations reinforcing the region. In World War II, it served as a training base for the Xª MAS, an elite naval commando unit.

=== Symbols ===
Coat of arms of Lonato del Garda

The coat of arms of Lonato features a silver lion rampant on a blue field, holding two crossed golden keys in its right forepaw. Above the lion are three golden fleurs-de-lis, granted by King Louis XII of France in 1509 in recognition of the town's support during the French campaigns in northern Italy. The arms were formally confirmed by a presidential decree on 14 May 1952.

The official gonfalon, a vertically divided banner of white and blue bearing the coat of arms, was granted by decree on 25 June 1953.

=== Honorary titles ===
Lonato received the honorary title of “city” by presidential decree on 21 November 1996.

== Main sights ==
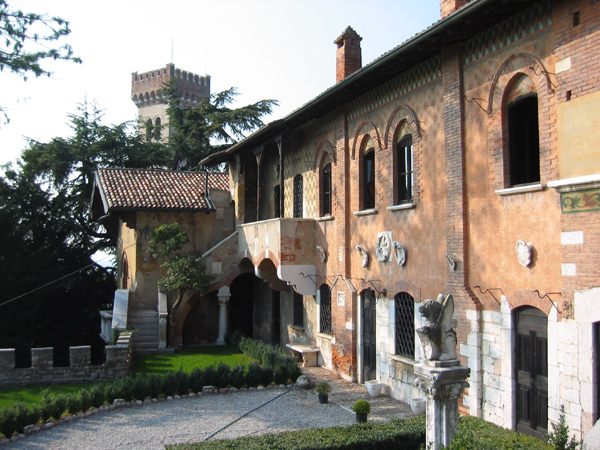
The Podestà House.

Around the main square, called Piazza Martiri della libertà, there is the town hall, the Venetian column, the Cathedral of San Giovanni Battista, and the Civic Tower (or Clock Tower).

Outside the centre of town, there are Roman ruins of Fornaci, the Abbazia di Maguzzano, Drugolo Castle, the churches of Madonna di San Martino, San Cipriano, and the pieve di San Zeno.

The House of the Podestà was built in the second half of the 15th century as the seat of the representative of the Venetian Republic, who controlled the region for more than 350 years (1441–1796). Only briefly was Lonato under Mantuan rule under Francesco II Gonzaga (1509–1516).

After Napoleon Bonaparte granted the Venetian domains to the Austrians, the Podestà House was used by the Austrians as barracks; later it became a property of the comune of Lonato, under which it fell into disrepair.

The building was auctioned in public in 1906, and bought by Ugo da Como and his wife Maria Glisenti, who, conscious of the historical importance, called the architect A. Tagliaferri to restore it. As was fashionable in his time, they furnished the house, and today the extensive collections include the library, 405 incunabula (one of the most important collections in Italy), 470 manuscripts and rare illuminated codes, parchments and prints. It also contains one of the smallest books in the world, 15x9 mm, which reproduces the letter by Galileo Galilei to Cristina di Lorena. In addition, it holds manuscripts of letters by Ugo Foscolo to his lover Marzia Martinengo, written in 1807–1809.

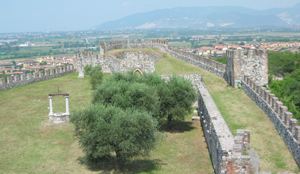
The Rocca.

The Rocca of Lonato surmounts a hill dominating the southern side of Lake Garda. The southern slope shelters the historical centre of Lonato, the limits of which, today, border the Padana lowlands.

The fortification's irregular form reveals a central structure almost 180 meters in length and approximately 45 metres in width. It is composed of two structures at different levels: the Rocca in the upper part and, lower down, what is called the General Quarters. Despite the long domination by the Visconti and Scaligeri families, the walled embankment, built in large morenic rocks, carries Guelph merlons.

In all probability, Lonato's castle was first built around the year 1000, when fortifications were raised around the area against the invasion of the barbarians. Its architectural design closely follows the standards of the 15th and 16th centuries, when it was rebuilt by the Visconti family of Milan.

After passing from the Gonzaga domination to Venice, then back to the Gonzaga and again to Venice, the castle passed to the Austrian Empire and finally to private hands. The military base was demolished, and the internal and external surface was transformed into agricultural land. In 1912, the castle was declared a national monument; it was bought by Senator Ugo da Como in 1920, who partly restored it, and since 1996 has housed the Museo Civico Ornitologico, conferences, weddings, and theatrical shows.

The Museo Civico Ornitologico (Museum of Birds) is located inside the castle and contains more than 700 specimens. The species represented are from the area of Lake Garda but also of exotic origin, together with specimens with rarities, unique characteristics, and plumage anomalies.

The Duomo (Cathedral) of San Giovanni Battista (St. John the Baptist) dates from the 19th century. It is an example of Baroque architecture, designed by the Lonato architect Paolo Sorattini and built during the second half of the 18th century. Its balanced cupola (20 metres in diameter and 60 metres high) and facade, soberly decorated with marble, are the basilica's most notable points. The Baroque interior is enriched with frescoes and altarpieces by Venetian artists such as Antonio Balestra and Giambettino Cignaroli.

The civic tower (1555) is 55 metres (180 ft) high, and it has a clock from 1773 with an original counterbalance mechanism.

The Fornaci Romane (Roman Furnaces) is an archaeological site south of Lonato, in Gorghi. Six Roman brickworks were recently found and restored. The brickworks have a circular shape with a firing chamber built using a technique with casts of pebbles stuck together with mortar. The ruins seem to indicate that this location was an important industrial centre between the 1st and 2nd centuries AD.

== Fairs and markets ==
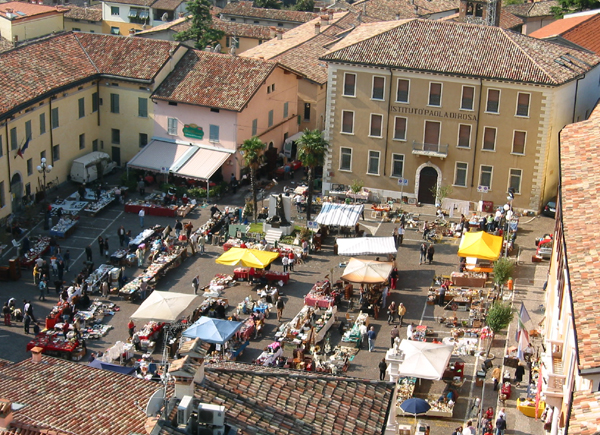
The antiquity market in the old town.

- "Mercantico": antiquity market, every 3rd week of the month, in the centre of the town
- Local market: every Thursday morning, in the centre of the town
- Town Fair: "Fiera di Lonato", January 17 (every year)

== Transportation ==
Lonato can be reached by car through the A4 motorway, using the Desenzano exit; and from the A22 motorway, with the exit of Desenzano del Garda.

Closest airports:

- Brescia Airport (VBS)
- Orio al Serio International Airport (BGY)
- Villafranca-Verona Airport (VRN)
- Milan Malpensa International Airport (MPX)
- Milan Linate Airport (LIN)

== People ==
- Reginald Pole (1500–1558)
- Camillo Tarello (ca. 1513–1573) agronomist
- Roberto Vecchioni (born 1943)

== Municipal government ==
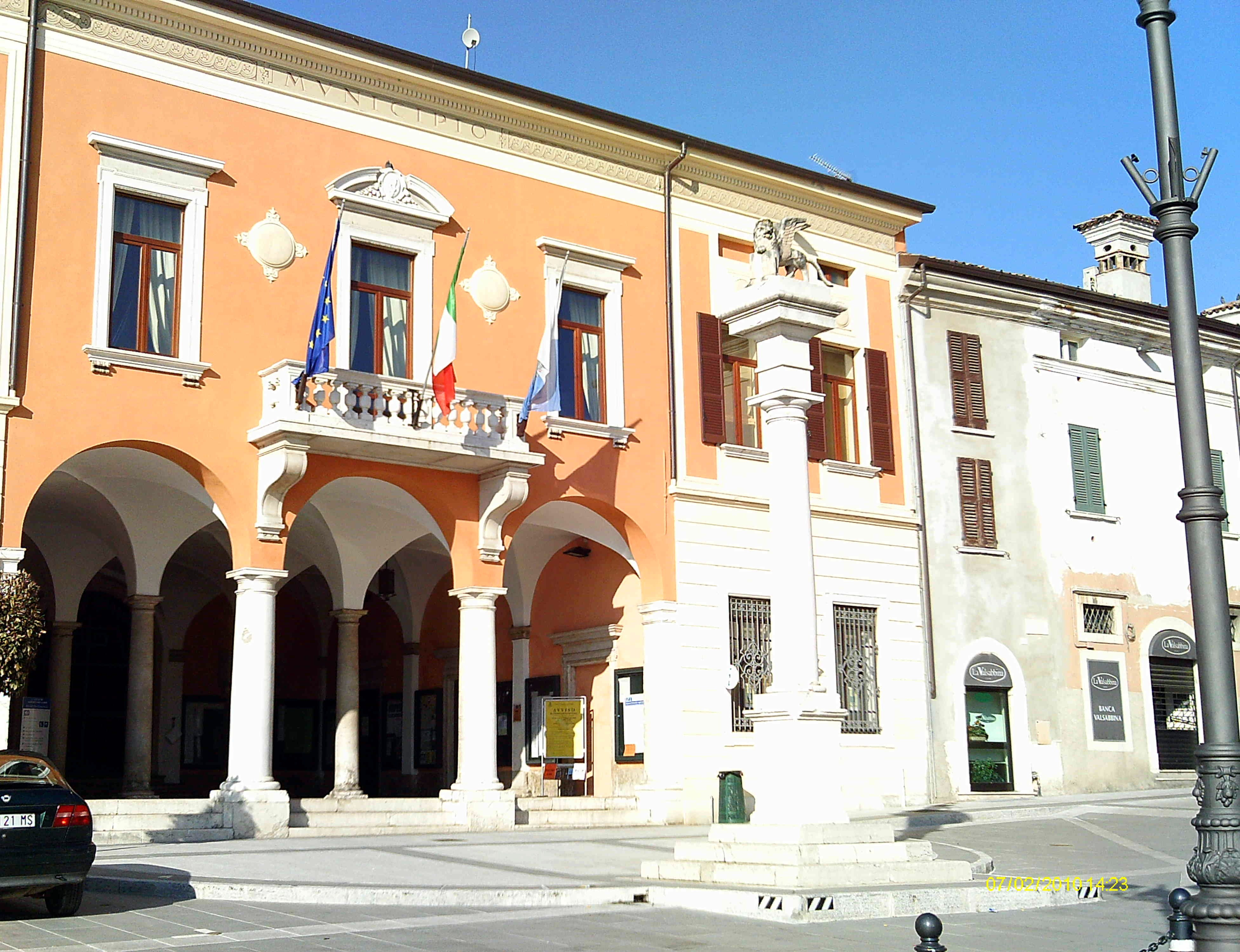
The town hall.

Lonato is headed by a mayor (sindaco) assisted by a legislative body, the consiglio comunale, and an executive body, the giunta comunale. Since 1993, the mayor and members of the consiglio comunale are directly elected together by resident citizens, while from 1946 to 1993 the mayor was chosen by the legislative body. The giunta comunale is chaired by the mayor, who appoints other members, called assessori. The offices of the comune are housed in a building usually called the municipio or palazzo comunale.

Since 1993, the mayor of Lonato has been directly elected by citizens, originally every four years, then every five years. The current mayor is Roberto Tardani (FI), elected on 15 June 2015.

Mayor	Term start	Term end	Party
Manlio Mantovani	7 June 1993	1 December 1999	LN
Rinaldo Argentieri*	1 December 1999	18 April 2000	
Morando Perini	18 April 2000	5 April 2005	DS
Mario Bocchio	5 April 2005	15 June 2015	FI
Roberto Tardani	15 June 2015	26 May 2026	FI
Nicola Bianchi	26 May 2026	Incumbent	Lega

* Special prefectural commissioner, nominated after the resignation of the mayor.

== Gallery ==
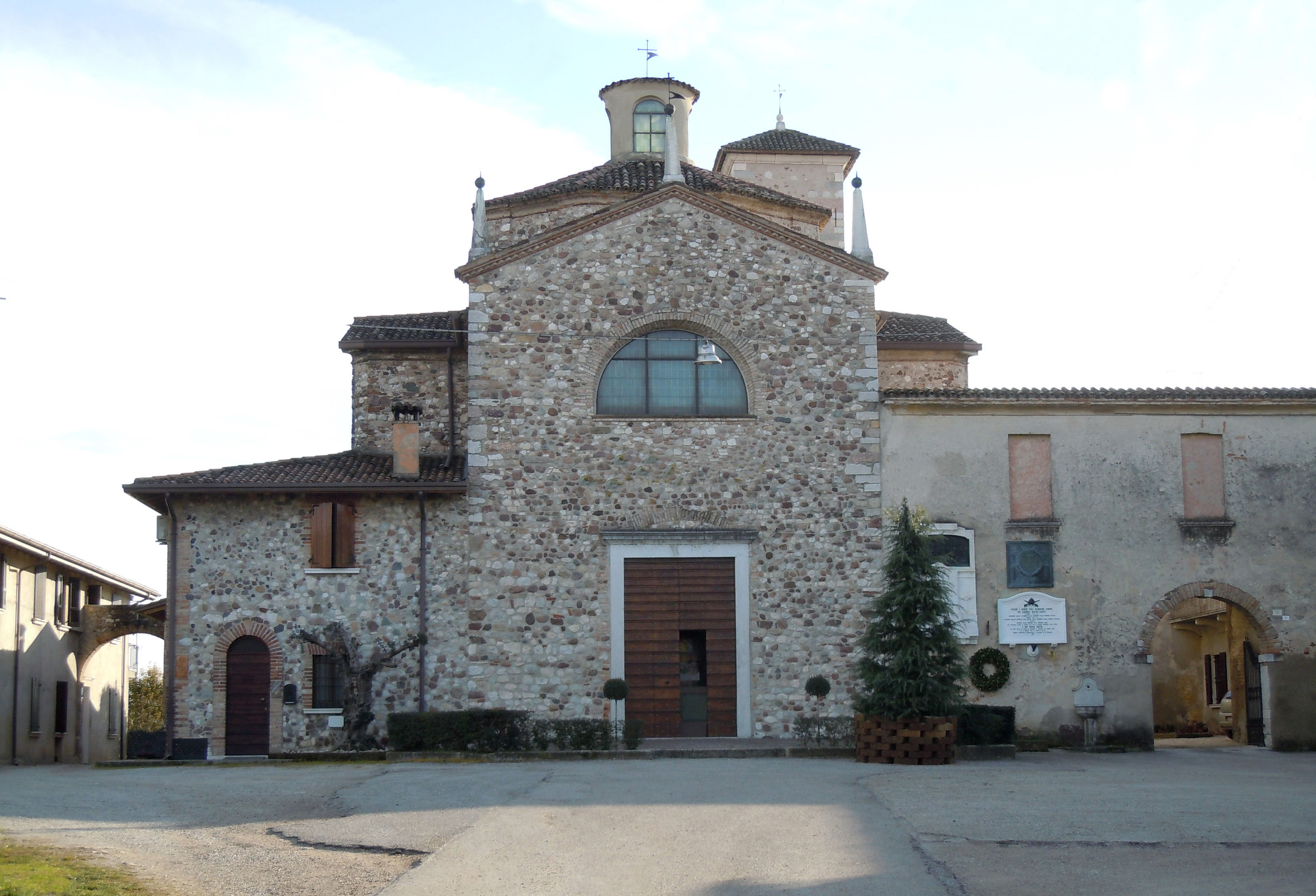
Sanctuary of Santa Maria della Scoperta

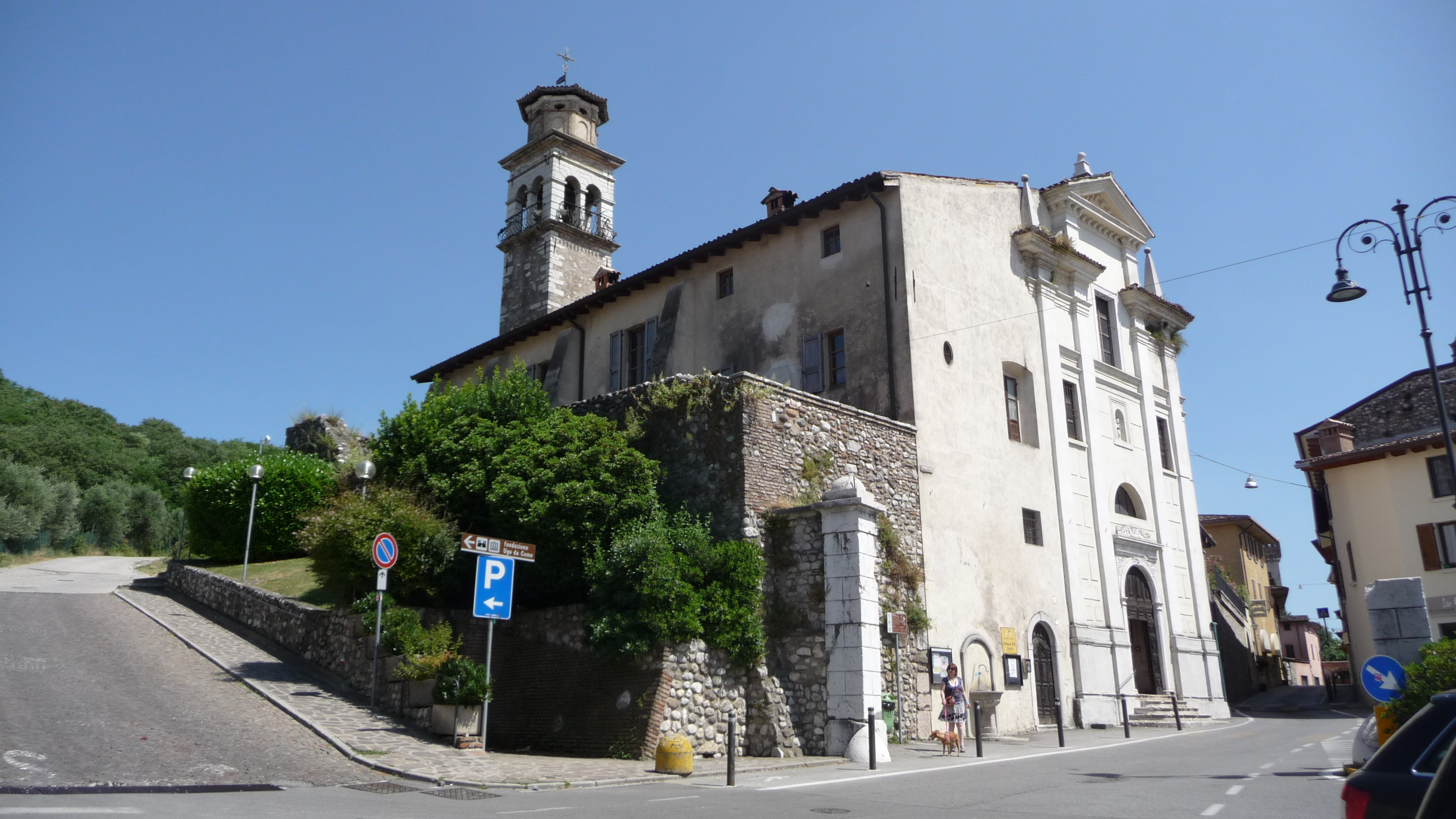
Church of Beata Vergine del Corlo at the entrance of the old town

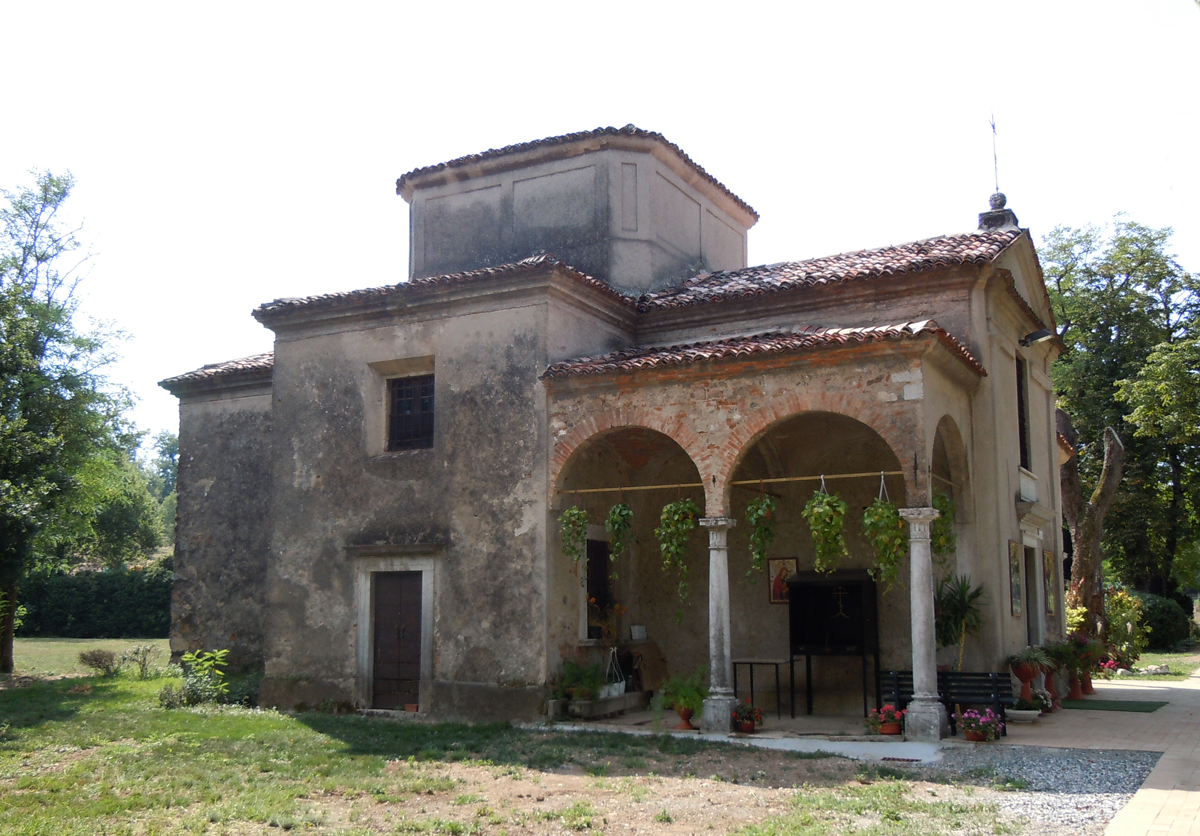
Church of Morti della Selva

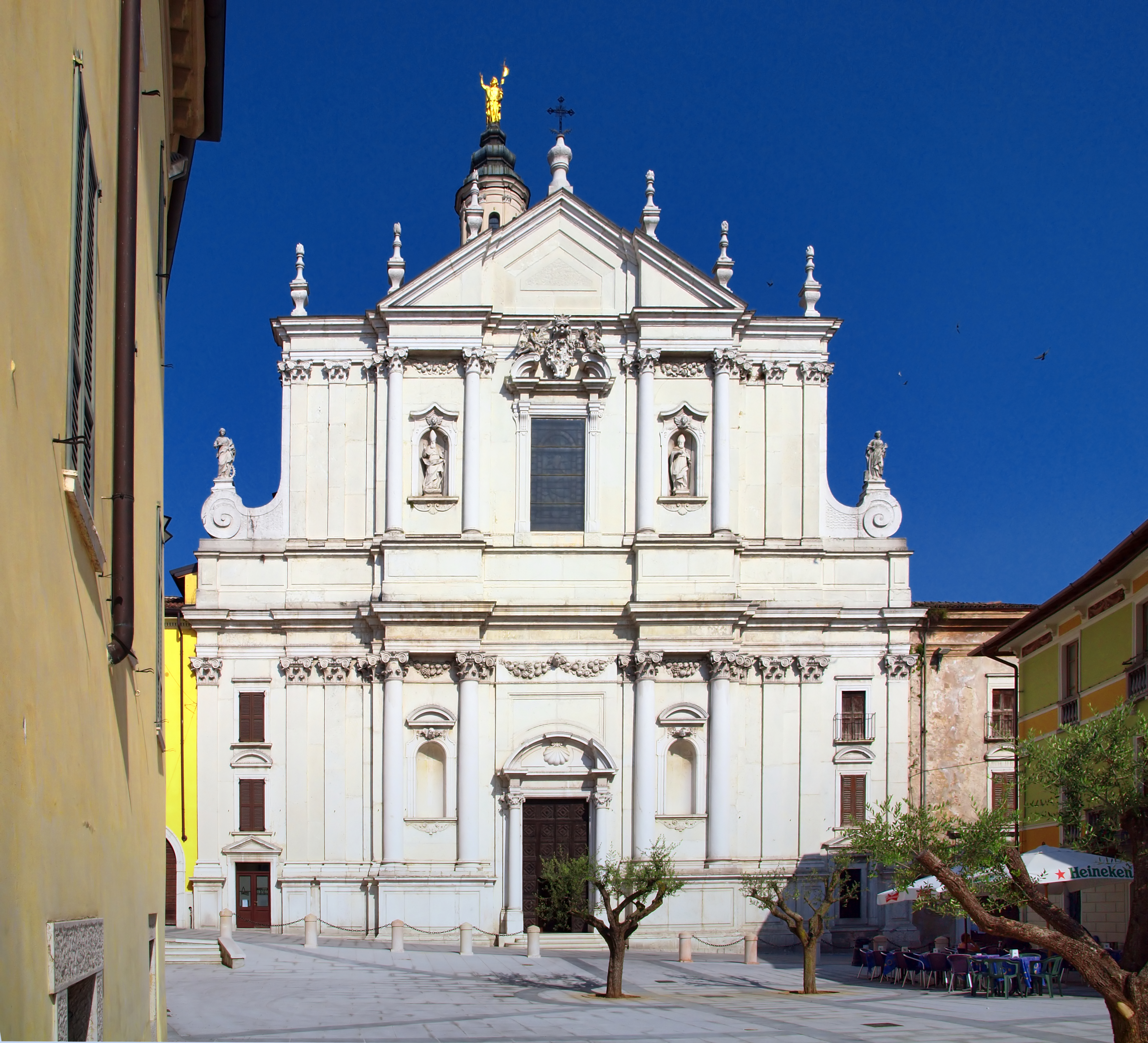
Saint John Basilica in the old town

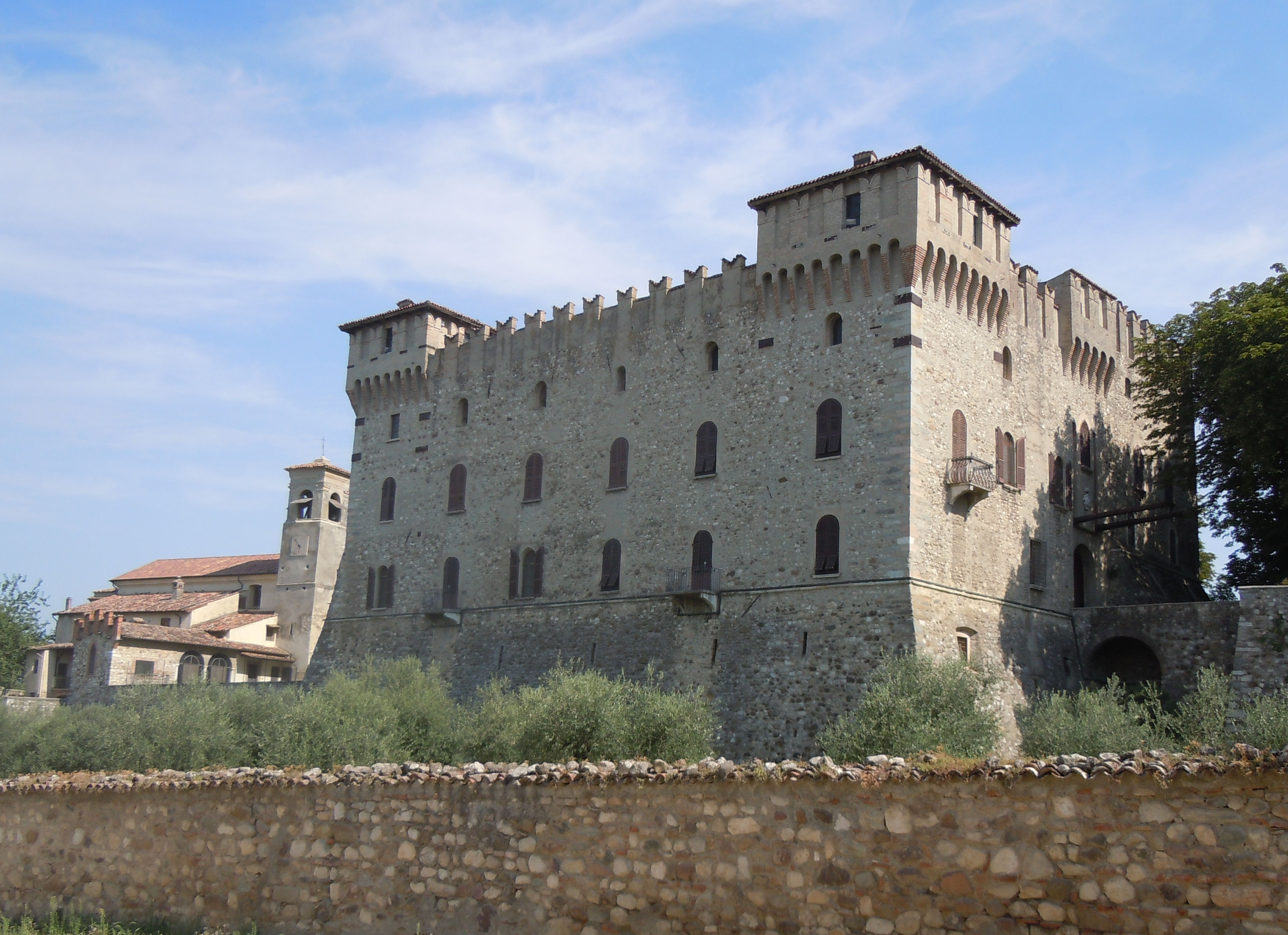
Castle in Drugolo

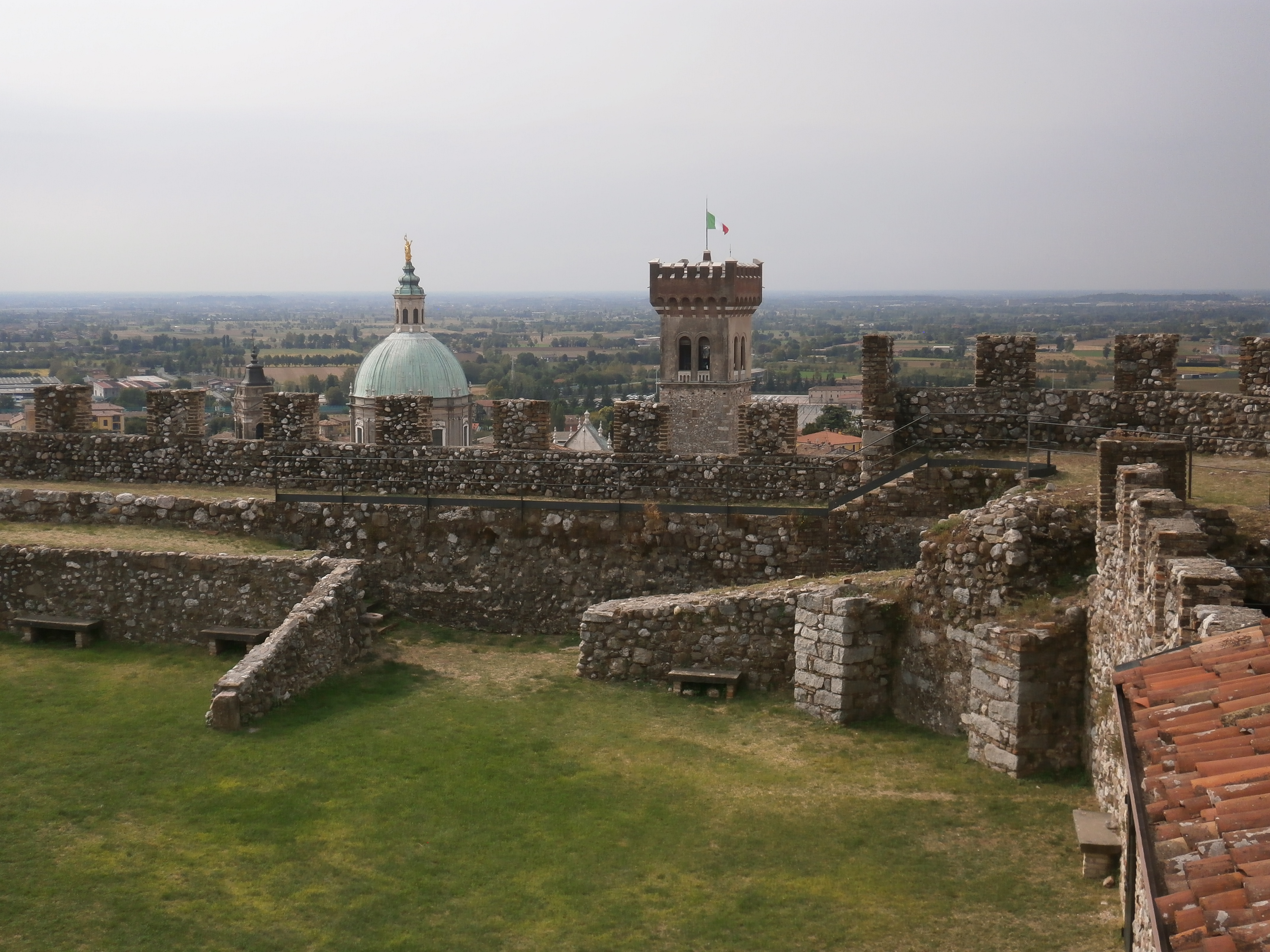
The Rocca

== See also ==
- Rocca di Manerba del Garda
