= Shooting at the 2024 Summer Olympics – Men's trap =

Men's trap at the Games of the XXXIII Olympiad
- Venue: National Shooting Centre, Châteauroux
- Dates: 29–30 July
- Competitors: 30 from 24 nations

Medalists
1st place, gold medalist(s)		Nathan Hales	Great Britain
2nd place, silver medalist(s)		Qi Ying	China
3rd place, bronze medalist(s)		Jean Pierre Brol	Guatemala

The Men's Trap event at the 2024 Summer Olympics took place on 29–30 July 2024 at the National Shooting Centre, Châteauroux in France.

Defending champion Jiří Lipták competed in this edition but was knocked out in the qualification round.

== Qualification ==
Rank	Athlete	Country	1	2	3	4	5	Total	Shoot-off	Notes
1	Qi Ying	China	25	23	25	25	25	123	7	Q
2	Nathan Hales	Great Britain	25	24	24	25	25	123	6	Q
3	James Willett	Australia	25	24	25	24	25	123	1	Q
4	Rickard Levin-Andersson	Sweden	25	24	25	24	25	123	0	Q
5	Jean Pierre Brol	Guatemala	24	25	23	25	25	122	14	Q
6	Derrick Mein	United States	23	24	25	25	25	122	13	Q
7	Giovanni Cernogoraz	Croatia	23	25	25	24	25	122	10	
8	Yu Haicheng	China	25	23	25	25	24	122	6	
9	Mitchell Iles	Australia	24	23	25	25	25	122	3	
10	Driss Haffari	Morocco	23	25	25	25	24	122	2	
11	Owen Robinson	New Zealand	23	25	23	25	25	121		
12	Yang Kun-pi	Chinese Taipei	22	25	25	24	25	121		
13	Mauro De Filippis	Italy	25	24	23	24	25	121		
14	Alberto Fernández	Spain	23	25	24	25	24	121		
15	Oğuzhan Tüzün	Turkey	25	25	23	24	24	121		
16	Giovanni Pellielo	Italy	24	24	25	25	23	121		
17	Khaled Al-Mudhaf	Kuwait	24	25	23	24	24	120		
18	Jiří Lipták	Czech Republic	24	21	24	25	25	119		
19	Sébastien Guerrero	France	24	23	23	24	25	119		
20	Eduardo Lorenzo	Dominican Republic	23	25	25	23	23	119		
21	Prithviraj Tondaiman	India	22	25	21	25	25	118		
22	Andrés García	Spain	22	24	25	23	24	118		
23	Saeed Abusharib	Qatar	24	22	24	25	23	118		
24	Mohammad Beiranvand	Iran	23	23	24	22	25	117		
25	Matthew Coward-Holley	Great Britain	24	22	24	23	24	117		
26	Marián Kovačócy	Slovakia	22	24	24	24	23	117		
27	William Hinton	United States	22	23	23	24	24	116		
28	Leonel Martínez	Venezuela	23	24	23	23	23	116		
29	Gianluca Chetcuti	Malta	24	22	23	25	22	116		
30	Said Al-Khatri	Oman	23	25	22	21	23	114		

== Final ==
Rank	Athlete	Country	1	2	3	4	5	Shoot-off	Notes
1st place, gold medalist(s)	Nathan Hales	Great Britain	24	29	33	38	48		OR
2nd place, silver medalist(s)	Qi Ying	China	23	28	31	35	44		
3rd place, bronze medalist(s)	Jean Pierre Brol	Guatemala	22	26	31	35			
4	Rickard Levin-Andersson	Sweden	23	28	30				
5	Derrick Mein	United States	22	26					
6	James Willett	Australia	19						
