= Shooting at the 2023 European Games – Men's team trap =

Men's team trap at the 2023 European Games
- Venue: Wrocław Shooting Centre
- Dates: 2 July
- Competitors: 24 from 8 nations
- Teams: 8

Medalists
| gold medal | Giovanni Cernogoraz; Anton Glasnović; Francesco Ravalico | Croatia |
| silver medal | Adrián Drobný; Marián Kovačócy; Erik Varga | Slovakia |
| bronze medal | João Azevedo; José Manuel Bruno Faria; Armelim Rodrigues | Portugal |

The men's team trap event at the 2023 European Games took place on 2 July at the Wrocław Shooting Centre.

== Records ==
Prior to this competition, the existing world, European and Games records were as follows.

Qualification
| World Record | — | — | — | — |
| European Record | Great Britain; Matthew Coward-Holley; Nathan Hales; Aaron Heading | 216 | Osijek, Croatia | 30 September 2022 |
| Games Record | — | — | — | — |

== Results ==
=== Qualification ===
| Rank | Country | Athlete | Round | | | Total | Team total | Notes |
| Rank | Country | Athlete | 1 | 2 | 3 | Total | Team total | Notes |
|---|---|---|---|---|---|---|---|---|
| 1 | Croatia | Giovanni Cernogoraz | 25 | 23 | 25 | 73 | 218+6 | QG, ER, GR |
| 1 | Croatia | Anton Glasnović | 24 | 25 | 24 | 73 | 218+6 | QG, ER, GR |
| 1 | Croatia | Francesco Ravalico | 24 | 24 | 24 | 72 | 218+6 | QG, ER, GR |
| 2 | Slovakia | Marián Kovačócy | 25 | 25 | 25 | 75 | 218+5 | QG, ER, GR |
| 2 | Slovakia | Adrián Drobný | 25 | 24 | 25 | 73 | 218+5 | QG, ER, GR |
| 2 | Slovakia | Erik Varga | 23 | 23 | 23 | 70 | 218+5 | QG, ER, GR |
| 3 | Portugal | João Azevedo | 24 | 25 | 24 | 73 | 217 | QB |
| 3 | Portugal | Armelim Rodrigues | 24 | 23 | 24 | 72 | 217 | QB |
| 3 | Portugal | José Manuel Bruno Faria | 24 | 24 | 24 | 72 | 217 | QB |
| 4 | Italy | Mauro De Filippis | 23 | 25 | 23 | 73 | 216+6 | QB |
| 4 | Italy | Giovanni Pellielo | 24 | 25 | 24 | 72 | 216+6 | QB |
| 4 | Italy | Daniele Resca | 24 | 23 | 24 | 71 | 216+6 | QB |
| 5 | Turkey | Oğuzhan Tüzün | 24 | 25 | 24 | 72 | 216+5 | |
| 5 | Turkey | Alp Kızılsu | 22 | 25 | 22 | 72 | 216+5 | |
| 5 | Turkey | Nedim Tolga Tunçer | 24 | 24 | 24 | 72 | 216+5 | |
| 6 | Poland | Tomasz Pasierbski | 25 | 24 | 25 | 73 | 214 | |
| 6 | Poland | Daniel Mrozek | 23 | 24 | 23 | 72 | 214 | |
| 6 | Poland | Piotr Kowalczyk | 25 | 21 | 25 | 69 | 214 | |
| 7 | Czech Republic | Jiří Lipták | 25 | 24 | 25 | 73 | 213 | |
| 7 | Czech Republic | Vladimír Štěpán | 24 | 23 | 24 | 71 | 213 | |
| 7 | Czech Republic | David Kostelecký | 22 | 25 | 22 | 69 | 213 | |
| 8 | Finland | Jukka Laakso | 24 | 22 | 24 | 70 | 205 | |
| 8 | Finland | Eemil Pirttisalo | 22 | 23 | 22 | 69 | 205 | |
| 8 | Finland | Teemu Ruutana | 23 | 20 | 23 | 66 | 205 | |

=== Finals ===
| Rank | Country | Athletes | Series | | | | | Total |
| Rank | Country | Athletes | 1 | 2 | 3 | 4 | 5 | Total |
|---|---|---|---|---|---|---|---|---|
Gold medal match
| 1st place, gold medalist(s) | Croatia | Giovanni Cernogoraz; Anton Glasnović; Francesco Ravalico | 10 | 13 | 14 | 13 | 12 | 7 |
| 2nd place, silver medalist(s) | Slovakia | Adrián Drobný; Marián Kovačócy; Erik Varga | 13 | 10 | 14 | 11 | 8* | 3 |
Bronze medal match
| 3rd place, bronze medalist(s) | Portugal | João Azevedo; José Manuel Bruno Faria; Armelim Rodrigues | 14 | 13 | 14 | | | 6 |
| 4 | Italy | Mauro De Filippis; Giovanni Pellielo; Daniele Resca | 10 | 12 | 9* | | | 0 |
