= Shooting at the 2023 European Games – Men's trap =

Men's trap at the 2023 European Games
- Venue: Wrocław Shooting Centre
- Dates: 29–30 June
- Competitors: 30 from 20 nations

Medalists
gold medal	Mauro De Filippis	Italy
silver medal	Vladimír Štěpán	Czech Republic
bronze medal	Rickard Levin Andersson	Sweden

The men's trap event at the 2023 European Games took place on 29 and 30 June at the Wrocław Shooting Centre.

== Records ==
Prior to this competition, the existing world, European and Games records were as follows.

Qualification
World Record	Giovanni Pellielo (ITA)	125	Nicosia, Cyprus	1 April 1994
European Record	Giovanni Pellielo (ITA)	125	Nicosia, Cyprus	1 April 1994
Games Record	Aleksey Alipov (RUS) Erik Varga (SVK)	123	Baku, Azerbaijan	17 June 2015

== Results ==
=== Qualification ===
Rank	Athlete	Country	Day 1			Day 2		Total	Notes
Rank	Athlete	Country	1	2	3	4	5	Total	Notes
1	Nedim Tolga Tunçer	Turkey	24	25	25	25	25	124+3	Q, GR
2	Gianluca Chetcuti	Malta	25	24	25	25	25	124+2	Q, GR
3	Mauro De Filippis	Italy	25	25	25	25	23	123+4	Q
4	Andrés García	Spain	25	24	24	25	25	123+3	Q
5	Vladimír Štěpán	Czech Republic	22	25	25	25	25	122+11	Q
6	Francesco Ravalico	Croatia	24	25	24	24	25	122+10	Q
7	João Azevedo	Portugal	25	22	25	25	24	121+6	Q
8	Rickard Levin Andersson	Sweden	25	25	23	25	23	121+5	Q
9	Matthew Coward-Holley	Great Britain	25	24	23	25	24	121+1	
10	Anton Glasnović	Croatia	25	25	24	23	24	121+0	
11	Armelim Rodrigues	Portugal	25	25	24	25	22	121+0	
12	Aaron Heading	Great Britain	24	24	24	23	25	120	
13	Paul Pigorsch	Germany	25	24	24	22	25	120	
14	Andres Kull	Estonia	24	23	25	24	24	120	
15	Adrián Drobný	Slovakia	23	25	24	24	24	120	
16	Andreas Makri	Cyprus	24	24	25	23	24	120	
17	Oğuzhan Tüzün	Turkey	24	24	24	25	23	120	
18	Giovanni Pellielo	Italy	24	24	25	24	23	120	
19	Adrià Martínez	Spain	24	23	23	25	24	119	
20	Erik Varga	Slovakia	24	24	24	24	23	119	
21	Ioannis Chatzitsakiroglou	Greece	23	24	25	25	22	119	
22	Piotr Kowalczyk	Poland	24	25	25	23	22	119	
23	David Kostelecký	Czech Republic	24	25	23	22	24	118	
24	Eemil Pirttisalo	Finland	25	22	24	24	23	118	
25	Jukka Laakso	Finland	22	24	23	23	25	117	
26	Clément Bourgue	France	24	22	24	22	25	117	
27	Boštjan Maček	Slovenia	25	24	23	21	23	116	
28	Lyndon Sosa	Luxembourg	24	25	20	21	24	114	
29	Tomasz Pasierbski	Poland	22	23	22	24	23	114	
30	Gian Marco Berti	San Marino	23	23	21	23	23	113	

=== Ranking matches ===
Rank	Athlete	Series					Total	Notes
Rank	Athlete	1	2	3	4	5	Total	Notes
1	Vladimír Štěpán (CZE)	5	4	4	5	4	22	Q
2	Mauro De Filippis (ITA)	4	3	5	5	3	20	Q
3	Nedim Tolga Tunçer (TUR)	3	4	5	3	4	19	
4	João Azevedo (POR)	2	5	4			11	

Rank	Athlete	Series					Total	Notes
Rank	Athlete	1	2	3	4	5	Total	Notes
1	Rickard Levin Andersson (SWE)	3	5	5	4	4	21	Q
2	Francesco Ravalico (CRO)	3	5	5	4	3	20	Q
3	Gianluca Chetcuti (MLT)	3	5	5	2	4	19	
4	Andrés García (ESP)	5	1	3			9	

=== Medal match ===
Rank	Athlete	Series							Total
Rank	Athlete	1	2	3	4	5	6	7	Total
1st place, gold medalist(s)	Mauro De Filippis (ITA)	5	5	5	4	5	4	4	32
2nd place, silver medalist(s)	Vladimír Štěpán (CZE)	4	4	4	5	5	4	5	31
3rd place, bronze medalist(s)	Rickard Levin Andersson (SWE)	5	3	5	5	4			22
4	Francesco Ravalico (CRO)	3	3	4					10
