= 1956 European Shotgun Championships =

- Dates: 31 July – 6 August
- Host city: San Sebastián, Spain
- Level: Senior
- Events: 4 men (2 individual + 2 team)
- Participation: 14 nations

The 1956 European Shotgun Championships was the 1st edition of the global shotgun competition, European Shotgun Championships, organised by the International Shooting Sport Federation.

== Results ==
Event	Gold		Silver		Bronze	
Event	Athlete	Pts	Athlete	Pts	Athlete	Pts
Skeet	(France) Albert Voisin	97/100	(Greece) Ioannis Christides	94/100	(Portugal) Guy de Valle Flor	92/100
Skeet, team	France; Albert Voisin ? ? ?		Lebanon ? ? ? ?		Spain ? ? ? ?	
Trap	(Lebanon) Maurice Tabet	197	(Lebanon) Aref Diab		(Germany) Rudolf Sack	
Trap, team	Lebanon; Maurice Tabet; Aref Diab ? ?		Italy ? ? ? ?		Egypt ? ? ? ?	

== Medal table ==
Host country

#	Country	1st place, gold medalist(s)	2nd place, silver medalist(s)	3rd place, bronze medalist(s)	Tot.
1	Lebanon	2	2	0	4
2	France	2	0	0	2
3	Greece	0	1	0	1
3	Italy	0	1	0	1
5	Egypt	0	0	1	1
5	Spain	0	0	1	1
5	Portugal	0	0	1	1
5	West Germany	0	0	1	1

== See also ==
- European Shooting Confederation
- International Shooting Sport Federation
- List of medalists at the European Shotgun Championships
