= Shooting at the 2023 European Games – Mixed team trap =

Mixed team trap at the 2023 European Games
- Venue: Wrocław Shooting Centre
- Dates: 1 July
- Competitors: 42 from 16 nations
- Teams: 21

Medalists
gold medal	Jessica Rossi; Giovanni Pellielo	Italy
silver medal	Lucy Hall; Matthew Coward-Holley	Great Britain
bronze medal	Giulia Grassia; Mauro De Filippis	Italy

The mixed team trap event at the 2023 European Games took place on 1 July at the Wrocław Shooting Centre.

== Records ==
Prior to this competition, the existing world, European and Games records were as follows.

Qualification
World Record	Australia; Penny Smith; Mitchell Iles-Crevatin Turkey; Safiye Sarıtürk Temizdemir; Nedim Tolga Tunçer United States; Kayle Browning; Brian Burrows	149	Acapulco, Mexico	20 March 2019
European Record	Turkey; Safiye Sarıtürk Temizdemir; Nedim Tolga Tunçer	149	Acapulco, Mexico	20 March 2019
Games Record	Spain; Fátima Gálvez; Antonio Bailón	143	Minsk, Belarus	24 June 2019

== Results ==
=== Qualification ===
Rank	Country	Athlete	Round			Total	Team total	Notes
Rank	Country	Athlete	1	2	3	Total	Team total	Notes
1	Great Britain 1	Lucy Hall	23	24	24	71	144	QG, GR
1	Great Britain 1	Matthew Coward-Holley	24	24	25	73	144	QG, GR
2	Italy 1	Jessica Rossi	24	24	24	72	143+4	QG
2	Italy 1	Giovanni Pellielo	23	24	24	71	143+4	QG
3	Italy 2	Giulia Grassia	23	21	21	68	143+3	QB
3	Italy 2	Mauro De Filippis	25	25	25	75	143+3	QB
4	Finland 2	Noora Antikainen	22	25	23	70	143	QB
4	Finland 2	Jukka Laakso	23	25	25	73	143	QB
5	France	Carole Cormenier	24	23	23	70	142	
5	France	Clément Bourgue	23	24	25	72	142	
6	Germany	Kathrin Murche	22	22	24	68	141	
6	Germany	Paul Pigorsch	25	23	25	73	141	
7	Poland	Sandra Bernal	24	24	23	71	141	
7	Poland	Piotr Kowalczyk	23	24	23	70	141	
8	Slovakia	Jana Špotáková	22	24	23	69	141	
8	Slovakia	Adrián Drobný	25	25	22	72	141	
9	Spain 2	Mar Molné	22	22	23	67	140	
9	Spain 2	Adrià Martínez	24	24	25	73	140	
10	Turkey 1	Safiye Sarıtürk Temizdemir	22	24	22	68	140	
10	Turkey 1	Oğuzhan Tüzün	24	23	25	72	140	
11	Turkey 2	Rümeysa Pelin Kaya	23	22	22	67	140	
11	Turkey 2	Nedim Tolga Tunçer	25	24	24	73	140	
12	San Marino	Alessandra Perilli	22	21	24	67	139	
12	San Marino	Gian Marco Berti	23	25	24	72	139	
13	Cyprus	Georgia Konstantinidou	23	22	24	69	139	
13	Cyprus	Andreas Makri	23	24	23	70	139	
14	Portugal	Maria Inês Barros	22	25	22	69	139	
14	Portugal	João Azevedo	23	24	23	70	139	
15	Finland 1	Satu Mäkelä-Nummela	23	22	25	70	138	
15	Finland 1	Eemil Pirttisalo	23	22	23	68	138	
16	Spain 1	Fátima Gálvez	23	22	23	68	138	
16	Spain 1	Andrés García	24	24	22	70	138	
17	Great Britain 2	Georgina Roberts	24	23	23	70	138	
17	Great Britain 2	Aaron Heading	25	21	22	68	138	
18	Czech Republic	Zina Hrdličková	23	24	22	69	137	
18	Czech Republic	David Kostelecký	24	19	25	68	137	
19	Slovenia	Jasmina Maček	23	21	22	66	136	
19	Slovenia	Boštjan Maček	24	23	23	70	136	
20	Malta	Mikaela Galea	21	21	23	65	135	
20	Malta	Gianluca Chetcuti	24	21	25	70	135	
21	Luxembourg	Lena Bidoli	16	18	18	52	123	
21	Luxembourg	Lyndon Sosa	23	23	25	71	123	

=== Finals ===
Rank	Country	Athletes	Series					Total
Rank	Country	Athletes	1	2	3	4	5	Total
Gold medal match
1st place, gold medalist(s)	Italy 1	Jessica Rossi; Giovanni Pellielo	9	10	10	9	8*	6
2nd place, silver medalist(s)	Great Britain 1	Lucy Hall; Matthew Coward-Holley	9	8	9	10	8	4
Bronze medal match
3rd place, bronze medalist(s)	Italy 2	Giulia Grassia; Mauro De Filippis	9	9	9	9	9	6
4	Finland 2	Noora Antikainen; Jukka Laakso	9	10	8	7	9	4
