= 1994 European Shotgun Championships =

1994 European Shooting Championships
- Host city: Lisbon, Portugal
- Level: Senior
- Events: 22

The 1994 European Shooting Championships was the 40th edition (included the European Shooting Championships), of the global shotgun competition, European Shotgun Championships, organised by the International Shooting Sport Federation.

== Winners ==
Events was 22, 12 men and 10 women.

=== Men ===
Event	Winner	Country
Air traffic	Rajmond Debevec	Slovenia
Air pistol	Wiktor Makarow	Ukraine
Air rifle, team	(Frank Dobler, Torsten Krebs, Matthias Stich)	Germany
Air pistol, team	(Marek Nowak etc.)	Poland
Running disk	Michael Jakosits	Germany
Running disc, team	(Michael Jakosits, Jens Zimmermann, Marko Schulze)	Germany
Stairs	Frans Peeters	Belgium
Skeet	Andrea Benelli	Italy
Trap, team	(Marco Venturini, Giovanni Pellielo, Roberto Scalzone)	Italy
Skeet, team	(Andrea Benelli, Ennio Falco, Bruno Rossetti)	Italy
Doppel-Trap	Karoly Gombos	Hungary
Doppel-Trap, team	(Albano Pera, Marco Cenci, Enrico Buffoli)	Italy

=== Women ===
Event	Winner	Country
Air rifle	Anna Maluchina	Russia
Luftpistole	Maria Grosdeva	Bulgaria
Air rifle, team	(Wera Stamm, Sonja Pfeilschifter, Petra Horneber)	Germany
Air pistol, team	(Maria Grosdeva, Diana Jorgova, etc.)	Bulgaria
Trap	Satu Pusila	Finland
Skeet	Erdjanik Awetisjan	Armenia
Trap, team	(Satu Pusila, Sini Rantapu, P. Julin)	Finland
Skeet, team	(Diana Igaly, E. Waswari, I. Gögölös)	Hungary
Doppel-Trap	Deborah Gelisio	Italy
Doppel-Trap, team	(Deborah Gelisio, Giovanna Pasello, Nadia Innocenti)	Italy

== See also ==
- European Shooting Confederation
- International Shooting Sport Federation
- List of medalists at the European Shooting Championship
