= 2022 European Shotgun Championships =

- Dates: 24 August - 12 September
- Host city: Larnaca, Cyprus
- Level: Senior
- Events: 3 men + 3 women (individual); 3 men + 3 women + 2 mixed (team)
- Participation: 397 athletes from 41 nations

The 2022 European Shotgun Championships was the 52nd edition of the global shotgun competition, European Shotgun Championships, organised by the European Shooting Confederation.

The championships also served as first qualification event for 2024 Summer Olympics.

== Men ==
Event	Gold	Silver	Bronze'
Skeet	Jakub Tomeček; Czech Republic	Luigi Lodde; Italy	Ben Llewellin; Great Britain
Skeet Team	Italy; Gabriele Rossetti; Tammaro Cassandro; Luigi Lodde	Greece; Efthimios Mitas; Charalambos Chalkiadakis; Nikolaos Mavrommatis	France; Éric Delaunay; Emmanuel Petit; Nicolas Lejeune
Trap	Jiří Lipták; Czech Republic	Rickard Levin-Andersson; Sweden	Nathan Hales; Great Britain
Trap Team	Italy; Lorenzo Ferrari; Daniele Resca; Mauro De Filippis	Croatia; Anton Glasnović; Francesco Ravalico; Josip Glasnović	Great Britain; Nathan Hales; Aaron Heading; Matthew Coward-Holley

== Women ==
Event	Gold	Silver	Bronze
Skeet	Amber Hill; Great Britain	Nadine Messerschmidt; Germany	Danka Barteková; Slovakia
Skeet Team	Great Britain; Emily Hibbs; Jessica Burgess; Amber Hill	Germany; Christine Wenzel; Nele Wissmer; Nadine Messerschmidt	Slovakia; Danka Barteková; Vanesa Hocková; Lucia Kopcanová
Trap	Silvana Stanco; Italy	Lucy Hall; Great Britain	Jessica Rossi; Italy
Trap Team	Italy; Silvana Stanco; Giulia Grassia; Jessica Rossi	Finland; Sara Nummela; Mopsi Veromaa; Noora Antikainen	Great Britain; Kirsty Hegarty; Ellie Seward; Lucy Hall

== Mixed ==
Event	Gold	Silver	Bronze
Skeet Team	Great Britain; Ben Llewellin; Amber Hill	Italy; Diana Bacosi; Tammaro Cassandro	Czech Republic; Jakub Tomeček; Barbora Šumová Sweden; Stefan Nilsson; Victoria Larsson
Trap Team	Italy; Jessica Rossi; Daniele Resca	Turkey; Oğuzhan Tüzün; Safiye Sarıtürk Temizdemir	Portugal; Maria Ines Coelho De Barros; João Azevedo Slovakia; Erik Varga; Zuzana Rehák-Štefečeková

== Medal table ==
=== Juniors ===
* Host nation (Cyprus)

Rank	Nation	Gold	Silver	Bronze	Total
1	Italy	5	2	3	10
2	Great Britain	2	0	1	3
3	Germany	1	3	1	5
4	Slovakia	1	1	0	2
5	Spain	1	0	0	1
6	Czech Republic	0	2	0	2
7	Turkey	0	1	2	3
8	Bulgaria	0	1	0	1
9	France	0	0	2	2
10	Finland	0	0	1	1
10	Greece	0	0	1	1
10	Romania	0	0	1	1
Totals (12 entries)		10	10	12	32

=== Seniors ===
* Host nation (Cyprus)

Rank	Nation	Gold	Silver	Bronze	Total
1	Italy	5	2	1	8
2	Great Britain	3	1	4	8
3	Czech Republic	2	0	2	4
4	Germany	0	2	0	2
5	Sweden	0	1	1	2
6	Croatia	0	1	0	1
6	Finland	0	1	0	1
6	Greece	0	1	0	1
6	Turkey	0	1	0	1
10	Slovakia	0	0	2	2
11	France	0	0	1	1
11	Portugal	0	0	1	1
Totals (12 entries)		10	10	12	32

== Olympic quotas ==
Nation	Men's		Women's		Total
Nation	Trap	Skeet	Trap	Skeet	Total
Czech Republic	1	1			2
Germany				1	1
Great Britain			1	1	2
Italy		1	1		2
Sweden	1				1
Total: 5 countries	2	2	2	2	8
