= 2000 European Shotgun Championships =

2000 European Shooting Championships
- Host city: Montecatini Terme, Italy
- Level: Senior
- Events: 28

The 2000 European Shooting Championships was the 46th edition (included the of the European Shooting Championships), of the global shotgun competition, European Shotgun Championships, organised by the International Shooting Sport Federation.

== Winners ==
Events was 22, 12 men and 10 women.

=== Men ===
| Event | Winner | Country |
|---|---|---|
| Air rifle | Jean-Pierre Amat | France |
| Air pistol | Alexander Danilow | Israel |
| Air rifle, team | (Artem Kajibekov, K. Prichochenko, Yevgeny Aleinikov) | Russia |
| Air pistol, team | (Vladimir Goncharov, Boris Kokorev, Michail Nestrujew) | Russia |
| Running disc, normal running | Jozsef Sike | Hungary |
| Running disc, acc. Run | Alexander Ivanov | Russia |
| Running disc, normal run, team | (Jozsef Sike, Jozsef Angyan, Tamas Tasi) | Hungary |
| Running disc, acc. Run, team | (Alexander Ivanov, Dimitri Lykin, Igor Kolessow) | Russia |
| Trap | Joao Rebelo | Portugal |
| Trap team | (Giovanni Pellielo, Rodolfo Viganò, Marco Venturini) | Italy |
| Double trap | Vasily Mosin | Russia |
| Double trap team | (Vasily Mosin, ....) | Russia |
| Skeet | Pietro Genga | Italy |
| Skeet team | (Pietro Genga, Andrea Benelli, Ennio Falco) | Italy |

=== Women ===
| Event | Winner | Country |
|---|---|---|
| Air rifle | Valerie Bellenoue | France |
| Air pistol | Svetlana Smirnowa | Russia |
| Air rifle, team | (Petra Horneber, Sonja Pfeilschifter, Cordula Wilsch) | Germany |
| Air pistol, team | (Katarzyna Klepacz, Miroslawa Sagun, Julita Macur) | Poland |
| Running disc, normal running | Irina Ismalkowa | Russia |
| Running disc, mixed run | Audrey Soquet | France |
| Running disc, normal run, team | (Wolha Markowa, Anastassia Schytsikawa, Larissa Pankowets) | Belarus |
| Running disc, mixed run, team | (Wolha Markowa, Anastassia Schytsikawa, Larissa Pankowets) | Belarus |
| Trap | Anne Focan | Belgium |
| Trap team | (Roberta Pelosi, Cristina Bocca, Giulia Iannotti) | Italy |
| Double trap | Susanne Kiermayer | Germany |
| Double trap team | Giovanna Pasello, Nadia Innocenti, Arianna Perilli | Italy |
| Skeet | Maarit Lepomäki | Finland |
| Skeet team | (Erdzannik Awetisjan, ...) | Russia |

== See also ==
- European Shooting Confederation
- International Shooting Sport Federation
- List of medalists at the European Shooting Championship
