= 2019 World Shotgun Championships =

International shooting competition

- Location: Lonato del Garda, Italy
- Dates: 30 June – 11 July
- Competitors: 616 from 86 nations

The 2019 World Shotgun Championships were held from 30 June to 11 July 2019 in Lonato del Garda, Italy. As in all odd-numbered years, separate ISSF World Shooting Championships are held for trap, double trap and skeet events.

== Competition schedule ==
The competition schedule was as follows:

Date	Men	Women
Tuesday 2 July	Senior / junior trap (day 1)	Senior / junior trap (day 1)
Wednesday 3 July	Senior / junior trap (day 2)	Senior / junior trap (day 2)
Thursday 4 July	Senior / junior mixed trap team	
Friday 5 July	Senior / junior double trap Senior skeet (day 1)	Senior ~~/ junior~~ double trap Junior skeet (day 1)
Saturday 6 July	Senior skeet (day 2)	Junior skeet (day 2)
Sunday 7 July	Senior / junior mixed skeet team	
Monday 8 July	No competition	
Tuesday 9 July	Junior skeet (day 1)	Senior skeet (day 1)
Wednesday 10 July	Junior skeet (day 2)	Senior skeet (day 2)

== Senior medalists ==
=== Men ===
Event	Gold		Silver		Bronze	
Trap	Matthew Coward-Holley (GBR)		Mauro De Filippis (ITA)		Khaled Al-Mudhaf (KUW)	
Trap team	Italy; Mauro De Filippis; Valerio Grazini; Giovanni Pellielo	367	Kuwait; Khaled Al-Mudhaf; Abdulrahman Al-Faihan; Talal Al-Rashidi	363	Great Britain; Matthew Coward-Holley; Nathan Hales; Aaron Heading	363
Double trap	Antonino Barillà (ITA)		Hubert Olejnik (SVK)		Andrea Vescovi (ITA)	
Double trap team^{[a]}	Italy; Antonino Barillà; Andrea Vescovi; Alessandro Chianese	404	Kuwait; Ahmad Al-Afasi; Saad Al-Mutairi; Jarrah Al-Showaier	377	Slovakia; Hubert Olejnik; Filip Hutan; Filip Praj	376
Skeet	Tomáš Nýdrle (CZE)		Tammaro Cassandro (ITA)		Jeremy Bird (GBR)	
Skeet team	Sweden; Marcus Svensson; Stefan Nilsson; Henrik Jansson	365	Cyprus; Georgios Achilleos; Dimitris Konstantinou; Nicolas Vasiliou	364	Italy; Tammaro Cassandro; Gabriele Rossetti; Riccardo Filippelli	361

=== Women ===
Event	Gold		Silver		Bronze	
Trap	Ashley Carroll (USA)		Wang Xiaojing (CHN)		Fátima Gálvez (ESP)	
Trap team	United States; Ashley Carroll; Rachel Tozier; Kayle Browning	352	Russia; Iuliia Saveleva; Yulia Tugolukova; Tatiana Barsuk	349	Italy; Silvana Stanco; Jessica Rossi; Maria Palmitessa	343
Double trap^{[a]}	Claudia De Luca (ITA)		Sofia Maglio (ITA)		Mopsi Veromaa (FIN)	
Double trap team^{[a]}	Italy; Claudia De Luca; Sofia Maglio; Valeriya Sokha	335 WR	not awarded due to lack of entries			
Skeet	Diana Bacosi (ITA)		Wei Meng (CHN)		Victoria Larsson (SWE)	
Skeet team	United States; Dania Vizzi; Kim Rhode; Samantha Simonton	356 WR	Italy; Diana Bacosi; Chiara Cainero; Simona Scocchetti	355	China; Wei Meng; Zhang Heng; Zhang Donglian	348

=== Mixed ===
Event	Gold	Silver	Bronze
Trap team	Australia 2 Laetisha Scanlan; James Willett	Russia 2 Iuliia Saveleva; Maksim Smykov	Australia 1 Penny Smith; Thomas Grice
Skeet team	Italy 1 Gabriele Rossetti; Diana Bacosi	United States 1 Christian Elliott; Kim Rhode	China 2 Jin Di; Wei Meng

== Junior medalists ==
=== Men ===
Event	Gold		Silver		Bronze	
Trap	Leonardo Lustoza (BRA)		Matias Koivu (FIN)		Rene Maček (SLO)	
Trap team	Italy; Lorenzo Ferrari; Edoardo Antonioli; Matteo Marongiu	352	Finland; Matias Koivu; Teemu Ruutana; Patrik Nummela	346	United States; Steven Brown; Grayson Davey; Roe Reynolds	344
Double trap^{[a]}	Marco Carli (ITA)		Jacopo de Foresta (ITA)		Nicolo Liceti (ITA)	
Double trap team^{[a]}	Italy; Marco Carli; Jacopo de Foresta; Nicolo Liceti	297	not awarded due to lack of entries			
Skeet	Daniel Korcak (CZE)		Andrea Lapucci (ITA)		David McNeill (GBR)	
Skeet team	Italy; Andrea Lapucci; Andrea Galardini; Cristian Ghilli	356	United States; Alexander Ahlin; Ben Keller; Conner Prince	349	Russia; Andrei Danilenkov; Mark Eshchanov; Aleksandr Ivanov	348

=== Women ===
Event	Gold		Silver		Bronze	
Trap	Selin Ali (BUL)		Tatiana Saranskaia (RUS)		Zina Hrdličková (CZE)	
Trap team	United States; Carey Garrison; Nicole Manhave; Faith Pendergrass	321	Italy; Gaia Ragazzini; Sofia Littame; Greta Luppi	317	China; Zhang Ting; Hong Xinru; Chen Hongdan	308
Skeet	Zilia Batyrshina (RUS)		Katharina Jacob (USA)		Esmee van der Veen (NED)	
Skeet team	China; Lu Yikai; Li Wenyi; Song Zhengyi	343	Russia; Zilia Batyrshina; Elena Bukhonova; Anna Zhadnova	337	United States; Katharina Jacob; Austen Smith; Jasmine Otis	329

=== Mixed ===
Event	Gold	Silver	Bronze
Trap team	Czech Republic 2 Zina Hrdličková; Fabio Beccari	Italy 2 Gaia Ragazzini; Matteo Marongiu	Bulgaria; Selin Ali; Ivan Georgiev
Skeet team	United States 1 Alexander Ahlin; Austen Smith	Russia 1 Mark Eshchanov; Elena Bukhonova	China 2 Wu Liangliang; Lu Yikai

== Event status ==
^{a} Due to a lack of participation, certain disciplines were classed as Grand Prix events and do not count towards medal standings.

== Medal tables ==
=== Seniors ===
Rank	Nation	Gold	Silver	Bronze	Total
1	Italy (ITA)	4	3	3	10
2	United States (USA)	3	1	0	4
3	Great Britain (GBR)	1	0	2	3
4	Australia (AUS)	1	0	1	2
4	Sweden (SWE)	1	0	1	2
6	Czech Republic (CZE)	1	0	0	1
7	China (CHN)	0	2	2	4
8	Russia (RUS)	0	2	0	2
9	Kuwait (KUW)	0	1	1	2
9	Slovakia (SVK)	0	1	1	2
11	Cyprus (CYP)	0	1	0	1
12	Spain (ESP)	0	0	1	1
Totals (12 entries)		11	11	12	34

=== Juniors ===
Rank	Nation	Gold	Silver	Bronze	Total
1	Italy (ITA)	2	3	0	5
2	United States (USA)	2	2	2	6
3	Czech Republic (CZE)	2	0	1	3
4	Russia (RUS)	1	3	1	5
5	China (CHN)	1	0	2	3
6	Bulgaria (BUL)	1	0	1	2
7	Brazil (BRA)	1	0	0	1
8	Finland (FIN)	0	2	0	2
9	Great Britain (GBR)	0	0	1	1
9	Netherlands (NED)	0	0	1	1
9	Slovenia (SLO)	0	0	1	1
Totals (11 entries)		10	10	10	30
