= 1957 European Shotgun Championships =

- Host city: Paris, France
- Level: Senior
- Events: 4 men (2 individual + 2 team); 2 women (individual)

The 1957 European Shotgun Championships was the 2nd edition of the global shotgun competition, European Shotgun Championships, organised by the International Shooting Sport Federation.

== Results ==
=== Men ===
| Event | Gold | | Silver | | Bronze | |
| Event | Athletes | Pts | Athletes | Pts | Athletes | Pts |
|---|---|---|---|---|---|---|
| Skeet | (France) Michel Taris | | (United States) Waddel Smith | | (Belgium) Ludo Sheid | |
| Skeet, team | France; Michel Taris ? ? ? | | Belgium; Ludo Sheid ? ? ? | | United States; Waddel Smith ? ? ? | |
| Trap | (Lebanon) Maurice Tabet | 261 | (Italy) Daniele Ciceri | | (Italy) Alessandro Ciceri | |
| Trap, team | Lebanon; Maurice Tabet ? ? ? | | Italy; Daniele Ciceri; Alessandro Ciceri ? ? | | West Germany ? ? ? ? | |

=== Women ===
| Event | Gold | | Silver | | Bronze | |
| Event | Athlete | Pts | Athlete | Pts | Athlete | Pts |
|---|---|---|---|---|---|---|
| Skeet | (France) Maeva Wallis | | Not assigned | | | |
| Trap | (France) Brigitte Bar | | Not assigned | | | |

== Medal table ==
Host country

| # | Country | 1st place, gold medalist(s) | 2nd place, silver medalist(s) | 3rd place, bronze medalist(s) | Tot. |
|---|---|---|---|---|---|
| 1 | France | 4 | 0 | 0 | 4 |
| 2 | Lebanon | 2 | 0 | 0 | 2 |
| 3 | Italy | 0 | 2 | 1 | 3 |
| 4 | Belgium | 0 | 1 | 1 | 2 |
| 4 | United States | 0 | 1 | 1 | 2 |
| 6 | Germany | 0 | 0 | 1 | 1 |

== See also ==
- European Shooting Confederation
- International Shooting Sport Federation
- List of medalists at the European Shotgun Championships
