= Daniele Ciceri =

Italian sport shooter

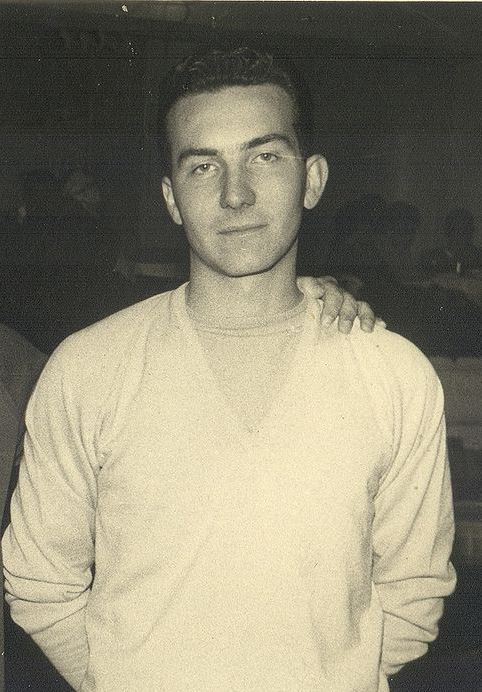
- Daniele Ciceri in 1957.

Personal information
- National team: Italy
- Born: Erba, Italy

Sport
- Sport: Shooting
- Event: Trap
Medal record
Individual
Event	1st	2nd	3rd
European Championships	0	2	0
Team
Event	1st	2nd	3rd
World Championships	0	1	0
European Championships	1	1	0
Total	1	2	0

Daniele Ciceri (born ?) is a former Italian sport shooter who won two medals at individual senior level at the European Championships.

== Biography ==
Together with his brother Alessandro, also a multi-medal shooter at the international shooting competition, also at the Olympic level, he was the owner of the famous Italian tool company Beta, sponsor in the 70s of the March of the Milanese driver Vittorio Brambilla in Formula One.

== Achievements ==
Year	Competition	Venue	Rank	Event	Score
1957	European Championships	(France) Paris	2nd	Trap	
1957	European Championships	(France) Paris	2nd	Trap team	
1958	World Championships	(Soviet Union) Moscow		Trap	
1958	World Championships	(Soviet Union) Moscow	2nd	Trap team	
1960	European Championships	(Spain) Barcelona	2nd	Trap	193
1960	European Championships	(Spain) Barcelona	1st	Trap team	

== See also ==
- Trap European Champions
