= Gareth McAuley (sport shooter) =

Northern Irish skeet shooter (born 1992)

Personal information
- Nationality: Northern Irish
- Born: 14 October 1992 (age 33) Ballymoney, Northern Ireland

Sport
- Sport: Clay pigeon shooting
- Event: Skeet shooting
- Coached by: Per Moen/Allen Warren
Medal record
Clay pigeon shooting
Representing Northern Ireland
Commonwealth Games
| Bronze medal – third place | 2018 Gold Coast | Skeet Men |
Commonwealth European Shooting Championships
| Gold medal – first place | 2018 Dungannon | Skeet Men |
| Gold medal – first place | 2018 Dungannon | Skeet Team |
| Gold medal – first place | 2018 Dungannon | Skeet Mixed Team |
| Bronze medal – third place | 2013 Isle of Man | Skeet Team |
Representing Great Britain
ISSF World Cup
| Bronze medal – third place | 2022 Changwon | Skeet Men Team |

Gareth McAuley (born 14 October 1992) is a Northern Irish skeet shooter.

== Early life ==
Gareth McAuley was born in Ballymoney, County Antrim in 1992.

== Career ==
McAuley started his shooting career at Route Gun Club, Ballymoney at the age of 16 in 2009, shooting English Skeet, and progressed onto Olympic Skeet the following year. McAuley qualified for his first Commonwealth Games and won a bronze medal at the 2018 Commonwealth Games in the skeet event in Gold Coast, Australia. McAuley is also a two time Home International winner in Olympic Skeet, winning the event in 2016 at Lispopple CPC, Dublin and in 2018 at National Shooting Centre of Scotland.

He has also been a Commonwealth European Champion, winning the Skeet Men individual event in Dungannon, Northern Ireland in 2018. He also won gold the in Skeet Team event with his brother Stephen McAuley, and also the Gold in the Skeet Mixed Team event with fellow Commonwealth Games athlete Alexandra Skeggs at the same venue.

He qualified for the Great Britain team for the first time in 2022, for the ISSF World Cups in Rabat, Morocco and Nicosia, Cyprus. He also qualified for the ISSF World Cup in Lonato, Italy, and also for the ISSF Grand Prix held in Granada, Spain. He qualified for his final event of the season at the ISSF World Cup in Changwon, South Korea where along with teammates Ben Llewellin and Freddie Killander, won a Bronze medal in the Skeet Men team event.

In 2025, he earned his first GB call up in 3 years with selection to the World Cup team for the ISSF World Cup in Nicosia, Cyprus.
