= Luigi Rossi (disambiguation) =

Luigi Rossi (1597–1653), was an Italian composer

Luigi Rossi may also refer to:

- Luigi de' Rossi (1474–1519), Italian cardinal
- Luigi Felice Rossi (1805–1863), Italian composer
- Luigi Rossi (painter) (1853–1923), Swiss painter
- Luigi Rossi (politician) (1867–1941), Italian Minister of Justice
- Luigi Rossi (sport shooter) (born 1933), Italian sport shooter
- Luigi Rossi di Montelera (1946–2018), Italian company manager and politician

== See also ==
- Rossi (disambiguation)
