= 1990 European Shotgun Championships =

1990 European Shooting Championships
- Host city: Uddevalla, Sweden
- Level: Senior
- Events: 18

The 1990 European Shooting Championships was the 36th edition (including the European Shooting Championships), of the global shotgun competition, European Shotgun Championships, organised by the International Shooting Sport Federation.

== Winners ==
Events was 18, 10 men and 8 women.

=== Men ===
Event	Winner	Country
Air rifle	Jean-Pierre Amat	France
Air pistol	Jerzy Pietrzak	Poland
Air rifle, team	(Yuri Fedkin, Alexander Slydenni, Yevgeny Aleynikov)	Soviet Union
Air pistol, team	(Boris Kokorev, Sergei Pyschanow, Igor Basinski)	Soviet Union
Running disc	Tor Heiestad	Norway
Running disc, team	(Attila Solti, Jozsef Sike, Angyan)	Hungary
Trap	Igor Schebanow	Soviet Union
Skeet	Bruno Rossetti	Italy
Trap, team	(Daniele Cioni, Albano Pera, Marco Venturini)	Italy
Skeet, team		Finland

=== Women ===
Event	Winner	Country
Air rifle	Eva Joo	Hungary
Air pistol	Nino Salukvadze	Soviet Union
Air rifle, team	(Irina Schilowa, Valentina Cherkassova, O. Krivoruchko)	Soviet Union
Air pistol, team	(Nino Salukwadse, Svetlana Smirnowa, Marina Logwinenko)	Soviet Union
Trap	Jelena Schischirina	Soviet Union
Skeet	Svetlana Demina	Soviet Union
Trap, team	(Yelena Schischirina, Maja Gubjewa etc.)	
Skeet, team	(Svetlana Demina, Sefira Meftakedinowa, Jelena Puschiana)	Soviet Union

== See also ==
- European Shooting Confederation
- International Shooting Sport Federation
- List of medalists at the European Shooting Championship
