= Wang Liming =

Wang Liming may refer to:

- Wang Liming (legal scholar) (born 1960), Chinese scholar of civil law
- Wang Liming (political cartoonist) (born 1973), pseudonym Rebel Pepper, Chinese political cartoonist
- Liu-Wang Liming (1897–1970), née Wang Liming, Chinese feminist
