= Shooting at the 2023 European Games – Women's team skeet =

Women's team skeet at the 2023 European Games
- Venue: Wrocław Shooting Centre
- Dates: 27 June
- Competitors: 15 from 5 nations
- Teams: 5

Medalists
gold medal	Martina Bartolomei; Chiara Di Marziantonio; Simona Scocchetti	Italy
silver medal	Danka Barteková; Vanesa Hocková; Monika Štibravá	Slovakia
bronze medal	Anna Šindelářová; Martina Skalická; Barbora Šumová	Czech Republic

The women's team skeet event at the 2023 European Games took place on 27 June at the Wrocław Shooting Centre.

== Records ==
Prior to this competition, the existing world, European and Games records were as follows.

Qualification
World Record	—	—	—	—
European Record	Italy; Diana Bacosi; Martina Bartolomei; Chiara Cainero	215	Nicosia, Cyprus	17 March 2022
Games Record	—	—	—	—

== Results ==
=== Qualification ===
Rank	Country	Athlete	Round			Total	Team total	Notes
Rank	Country	Athlete	1	2	3	Total	Team total	Notes
1	Slovakia	Danka Barteková	24	24	25	73	216	QG, ER, GR
1	Slovakia	Vanesa Hocková	24	24	25	73	216	QG, ER, GR
1	Slovakia	Monika Štibravá	24	24	22	70	216	QG, ER, GR
2	Italy	Simona Scocchetti	22	25	25	72	208	QG
2	Italy	Martina Bartolomei	24	23	24	71	208	QG
2	Italy	Chiara Di Marziantonio	17	23	25	65	208	QG
3	Czech Republic	Anna Šindelářová	23	24	22	69	203	QB
3	Czech Republic	Martina Skalická	23	21	23	67	203	QB
3	Czech Republic	Barbora Šumová	22	24	21	67	203	QB
4	Azerbaijan	Nurlana Jafarova	23	21	22	66	196	QB
4	Azerbaijan	Sevda Najafova	22	20	23	65	196	QB
4	Azerbaijan	Rigina Meftakhetdinova	23	21	21	65	196	QB
5	Turkey	Nur Banu Balkancı	22	23	23	68	186	
5	Turkey	Aylin Sarmat	19	19	21	59	186	
5	Turkey	Sena Can	20	19	20	59	186	
	Cyprus	Panayiota Andreou	Did not start					
	Cyprus	Anastasia Eleftheriou	Did not start					
	Cyprus	Konstantia Nikolaou	Did not start					

=== Finals ===
Rank	Country	Athletes	Series					Total
Rank	Country	Athletes	1	2	3	4	5	Total
Gold medal match
1st place, gold medalist(s)	Italy	Martina Bartolomei; Chiara Di Marziantonio; Simona Scocchetti	11	11	11	12		7
2nd place, silver medalist(s)	Slovakia	Danka Barteková; Vanesa Hocková; Monika Štibravá	10	10	11	—		1
Bronze medal match
3rd place, bronze medalist(s)	Czech Republic	Anna Šindelářová; Martina Skalická; Barbora Šumová	11	10	9			6
4	Azerbaijan	Nurlana Jafarova; Rigina Meftakhetdinova; Sevda Najafova	7	8	8			0
