= 2024 European Shotgun Championships =

- Dates: 17–26 May
- Host city: Lonato del Garda, Italia
- Level: Senior
- Events: 20

The 2024 European Shotgun Championships is the 54rd edition of the global shotgun competition, European Shotgun Championships, organised by the European Shooting Confederation.

The championships also served as a qualification event for 2024 Summer Olympics.

== Senior ==
=== Men ===
Event	Gold	Silver	Bronze'
Skeet	Sven Korte; Germany	Anatolii Semenenko	Andriy Kobzaruk; Ukraine
Skeet Team	Great Britain; Karl Killander; Mitchell Brooker-Smith; Ben Llewellin	Italy; Luigi Lodde; Tammaro Cassandro; Gabriele Rossetti	Czech Republic; Daniel Korčák; Radek Prokop; Tomáš Nýdrle
Trap	Alberto Fernández; Spain	Yavuz İlnam; Turkey	Boštjan Maček; Slovenia
Trap Team	Turkey; Yavuz İlnam; Oğuzhan Tüzün; Nedim Tolga Tunçer	Great Britain; Nathan Hales; Matthew Coward-Holley; Aaron Heading	Finland; Jukka Laakso; Juho Mäkelä; Eemil Pirttisalo

=== Women ===
Event	Gold	Silver	Bronze
Skeet	Diana Bacosi; Italy	Lucie Anastassiou; France	Daria Turulo
Skeet Team	Slovakia; Vanesa Hocková; Monika Štibravá; Danka Barteková	Italy; Diana Bacosi; Martina Bartolomei; Simona Scocchetti	Cyprus; Alndri Eleftheriou; Panagiota Andreou; Anastasia Eleftheriou
Trap	Fátima Gálvez; Spain	Kathrin Murche; Germany	Rümeysa Pelin Kaya; Turkey
Trap Team	Finland; Satu Mäkelä-Nummela; Noora Antikainen; Mopsi Veromaa	Italy; Jessica Rossi; Maria Lucia Palmitessa; Silvana Stanco	Germany; Kathrin Murche; Sarah Bindrich; Nadine Halwax

=== Mixed ===
Event	Gold	Silver	Bronze
Skeet Team	France; Lucie Anastassiou; Éric Delaunay	Greece; Efthimios Mitas; Emmanouela Katzouraki	Czech Republic; Jakub Tomeček; Barbora Šumová
Trap Team	Italy; Mauro De Filippis; Silvana Stanco	Italy; Giovanni Pellielo; Maria Lucia Palmitessa	San Marino; Gian Marco Berti; Alessandra Perilli

== Medal table ==
=== Senior ===
* Host nation (Croatia)

Rank	Nation	Gold	Silver	Bronze	Total
1	Italy	2	4	0	6
2	Spain	2	0	0	2
3	Germany	1	1	1	3
3	Turkey	1	1	1	3
5	France	1	1	0	2
5	Great Britain	1	1	0	2
7	Finland	1	0	1	2
8	Slovakia	1	0	0	1
9	Individual Neutral Athletes	0	1	1	2
10	Greece	0	1	0	1
11	Czech Republic	0	0	2	2
12	Cyprus	0	0	1	1
12	San Marino	0	0	1	1
12	Slovenia	0	0	1	1
12	Ukraine	0	0	1	1
Totals (15 entries)		10	10	10	30

== Olympic quotas ==
Nation	Men's		Women's		Total
Nation	Trap	Skeet	Trap	Skeet	Total
Spain	1				1
Germany				1	1
France		1			1
Turkey			1		1
Total: 2 countries	1	1	1	1	4
