= Nathan Hales =

British sport shooter (born 1996)

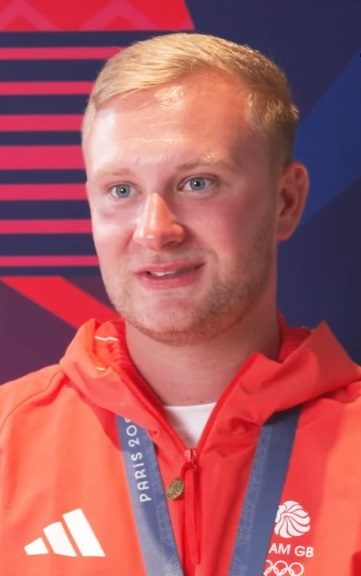
- Hales in 2024

Personal information
- Full name: Nathan Grant Hales
- Born: 16 June 1996 (age 30) Chatham, Kent, England

Sport
- Country: England
- Sport: Shooting
- Event: Trap
Medal record
Men's shooting
Representing Great Britain
Olympic Games
| Gold medal – first place | 2024 Paris | Trap |
World Championships
| Gold medal – first place | 2022 Osijek | Team trap |
| Silver medal – second place | 2022 Osijek | Trap |
| Silver medal – second place | 2022 Osijek | Mixed team trap |
| Silver medal – second place | 2026 Doha | Mixed team trap |
| Bronze medal – third place | 2019 Lonato del Garda | Team trap |
ISSF World Cups
| Bronze medal – third place | 2023 Doha | Trap |
| Bronze medal – third place | 2018 Tucson | Trap |
| Gold medal – first place | 2023 Lonato | Trap |
European Championships
| Gold medal – first place | 2023 Osijek | Team trap |
| Silver medal – second place | 2024 Lonato | Team trap |
| Bronze medal – third place | 2022 Larnaca | Trap |
| Bronze medal – third place | 2022 Larnaca | Team trap |
| Bronze medal – third place | 2023 Osijek | Mixed team trap |

Nathan Grant Hales (born 16 June 1996) is a British sport shooter.

== Career ==
He was born in Kent. He participated at the 2019 World Shotgun Championships, where he won team bronze in the trap.

At the 2022 World Shotgun Championships, Hales earned a quota place for the 2024 Olympic Games when he won silver in the Individual Men's Trap. He also won silver in the Mixed Pairs Trap with Lucy Hall and Senior Men's Team gold with Matthew Coward-Holley and Aaron Heading.

In 2023, he won the Men's Trap event at the Lonato leg of the ISSF World Cup series, where he broke the world record. This qualified him for the World Cup final in Doha, where he won bronze.

Hales won gold in the men's trap at the 2024 Summer Olympics, scoring 48 out of 50 to set a new Olympic record.
