= 1992 European Shotgun Championships =

1992 European Shooting Championships
- Host city: Istanbul, Turkey
- Level: Senior
- Events: 22

The 1992 European Shooting Championships was the 38th edition (included the of the European Shooting Championships), of the global shotgun competition, European Shotgun Championships, organised by the International Shooting Sport Federation.

== Winners ==
Events was 22, 12 men and 10 women.

=== Men ===
Event	Winner	Country
Air rifle	Goran Maksimović	Yugoslavia
Air pistol	Boris Kokorew	CIS
Air rifle, team	(Thomas Farnik, Wolfram Waibel, Thomas Lampe)	Austria
Air pistol, team	(Boris Kokorev, Sergei Pyschjanow, Sergej Barmin)	CIS
Running disk	Andrej Wassiljew	CIS
Running disc, team	(Andrej Wassilew, Gennadi Awramenko, Alexej Poslow)	CIS
Trap	Marco Conti	Italy
Skeet	Bronislav Bechynsky	Czechoslovakia
Trap, team	(Roberto Scalzone, Marco Conti, Albano Pera)	Italy
Skeet, team	(Axel Wegner, Bernd Hochwald, Dunkel)	Germany
Double trap	Alp Kizilsu	Turkey
Double trap, team		Turkey

=== Women ===
Event	Winner	Country
Air rifle	Anica Valkova	Bulgaria
Air pistols	Jasna Sekaric	Yugoslavia
Air rifle, team	(Walentina Tscherkassowa, Svetlana Seledkowa, Irina Schilowa)	CIS
Air pistols, team	(Jasna Sekaric, Mirella Skoko, Maja Stepanovic, Esther Poljak)	Yugoslavia
Trap	Jelena Schischirina	Soviet Union
Skeet	Erdjanik Awetisjan	CIS
Trap, team	(Jelena Schischirina, Tkatsch, Wolkowa)	CIS
Skeet, team	(Erdjanik Awetisjan, Swetlana Demina, Jelena Pischina)	CIS
Double-Trap	Satu Rantapu	Finland
Double trap, team		CIS

== See also ==
- European Shooting Confederation
- International Shooting Sport Federation
- List of medalists at the European Shooting Championship
