= 1996 European Shotgun Championships =

1996 European Shooting Championships
- Host city: Tallinn, Estonia
- Level: Senior
- Events: 25

The 1996 European Shooting Championships was the 42nd edition (included the of the European Shooting Championships), of the global shotgun competition, European Shotgun Championships, organised by the International Shooting Sport Federation.

== Winners ==
Events was 22, 12 men and 10 women.

=== Men ===
Event	Winner	Country
Air rifle	Wolfram Waibel	Austria
Air pistol	Hans-Jürgen Neumaier	Germany
Air rifle, team	(Harald Stenvaag, Nils Petter Häkedal, Leif Steinar)	Norway
Air pistol, team	(Mikhail Nestruev, Sergei Pyshyanov, Boris Kokorev)	Russia
Running disc, norm. Running	Carlo Colombo	Italy
Running disc, acc. Run	Miroslav Janus	Czechoslovakia
Running disc, team	(Michael Jakosits, Jens Zimmermann, Manfred Kurzer)	Germany
Running disc, acc. Run, team	(Juri Ermolenko, Anatoli Asrabajew, Igor Kolosew)	Russia
Trap	Ian Peel	United Kingdom
Skeet	Jürgen Raabe	Germany
Trap, Team	(Ian Peel etc.)	United Kingdom
Skeet, team	(Jürgen Raabe, P. Schulz, Axel Wegner)	Germany
Doppel-Trap	Claudio Franzoni	Italy
Double trap, team	(Claudio Franzoni, Ugo Procacci, Daniele Di Spigno)	Italy

=== Women ===
Event	Winner	Country
Air rifle	Irina Schilowa	Belarus
Air pistols	Jasna Sekaric	Yugoslavia
Air rifle, team	(Irina Schilowa, Olga Pogrednjuk, Natalja Jukowa)	Belarus
Air pistol, team	(Olga Klotschnewa, Svetlana Smirnowa, Galina Belajewa)	Russia
Running disk	Rita Csanaki	Hungary
Running disc, team	(Rita Csanaki, Orsolya Kuti etc.)	Hungary
Trap	Christina Bocca	Italy
Skeet	Jaana Pitkänen	Finland
Trap, team	(Cristina Bocca, Roberta Pelosi, Paola Tattini)	Italy
Doppel-Trap	Nadia Innocenti	Italy
Double trap, team	(Nadia Innocenti, Arianna Perilli, Natascia Baroni)	Italy

== See also ==
- European Shooting Confederation
- International Shooting Sport Federation
- List of medalists at the European Shooting Championship
