= José Manuel Bruno Faria =

Portuguese sport shooter (born 1985)

Personal information
- Nationality: Portuguese
- Born: 13 July 1985 (age 40) Quarteira, Portugal
- Height: 1.70 m (5 ft 7 in)

Sport
- Sport: Shooting
- Event: Trap
- Start activity: 1996
- Coached by: Antonio Sousa
Medal record
Individual
Event / 1st / 2nd / 3rd; European Championships / 0 / 1 / 0
Men's shooting
Representing Portugal
European Games
Bronze medal – third place	2023 Kraków-Małopolska	Team trap

José Manuel Bruno Faria (born 13 July 1985) is a Portuguese sport shooter who won a medal at individual senior level at the European Championships.
