= 2022 World Shotgun Championships =

Annual shooting competition

- Location: Osijek, Croatia
- Dates: 19 September – 12 October
- Competitors: 633 from 77 nations

The 2022 World Shotgun Championships were held from 19 September to 12 October 2022 in Osijek, Croatia. The championships are a major qualification event for the 2024 Olympic Games, with quota places for the Games being distributed in both men's and women's individual trap and skeet competitions.

== Competition schedule ==
The competition schedule was as follows:

Date	Men	Women
Wednesday 21 September	Junior trap (day 1)	Junior trap (day 1)
Thursday 22 September	Junior trap (day 2)	Junior trap (day 2)
Friday 23 September	Junior mixed trap team	
Saturday 24 September	Junior trap team	
Sunday 25 September	Pre-event training senior trap	
Monday 26 September	Senior trap (day 1)	Senior trap (day 1)
Tuesday 27 September	Senior trap (day 2)	Senior trap (day 2)
Wednesday 28 September	Senior trap (day 3)	Senior trap (day 3)
Thursday 29 September	Senior mixed trap team	
Friday 30 September	Senior trap team	
Saturday 1 October	Pre-event training junior skeet	
Sunday 2 October	Junior skeet (day 1)	Junior skeet (day 1)
Monday 3 October	Junior skeet (day 2)	Junior skeet (day 2)
Tuesday 4 October	Junior mixed skeet team	
Wednesday 5 October	Junior skeet team	
Thursday 6 October	Pre-event training senior skeet	
Friday 7 October	Senior skeet (day 1)	Senior skeet (day 1)
Saturday 8 October	Senior skeet (day 2)	Senior skeet (day 2)
Sunday 9 October	Senior skeet (day 3)	Senior skeet (day 3)
Monday 10 October	Senior mixed skeet team	
Tuesday 11 October	Senior skeet team	

== Senior medalists ==
=== Men ===
Event	Gold	Silver	Bronze
Trap	Derrick Mein (USA)	Nathan Hales (GBR)	Yang Kun-pi (TPE)
Trap team	Great Britain; Nathan Hales; Matthew Coward-Holley; Aaron Heading	Czech Republic; Jiří Lipták; David Kostelecký; Vladimír Štěpán	Italy; Lorenzo Ferrari; Marco Correzzola; Mauro De Filippis
Skeet	Azmy Mehelba (EGY)	Vincent Hancock (USA)	Rashid Saleh Al-Athba (QAT)
Skeet team	Italy; Tammaro Cassandro; Elia Sdruccioli; Gabriele Rossetti	United States; Dustan Taylor; Christian Elliott; Vincent Hancock	Czech Republic; Radek Prokop; Jakub Tomeček; Tomáš Nýdrle

=== Women ===
Event	Gold	Silver	Bronze
Trap	Carole Cormenier (FRA)	Fátima Gálvez (ESP)	Zuzana Rehák-Štefečeková (SVK)
Trap team	Italy; Alessia Iezzi; Giulia Grassia; Jessica Rossi	Finland; Satu Mäkelä-Nummela; Noora Antikainen; Mopsi Veromaa	Australia; Catherine Skinner; Penny Smith; Laetisha Scanlan
Skeet	Diana Bacosi (ITA)	Amber Hill (GBR)	Samantha Simonton (USA)
Skeet team	United States; Dania Vizzi; Austen Smith; Samantha Simonton	Italy; Chiara Cainero; Chiara Di Marziantonio; Diana Bacosi	China; Jiang Yiting; Che Yufei; Huang Sixue

=== Mixed ===
Event	Gold	Silver	Bronze
Trap team	Italy; Mauro De Filippis; Giulia Grassia	Great Britain; Nathan Hales; Lucy Hall	Australia; James Willett; Laetisha Scanlan Slovenia; Boštjan Maček; Jasmina Maček
Skeet team	Great Britain; Ben Llewellin; Amber Hill	Italy; Diana Bacosi; Gabriele Rossetti	France; Nicolas Lejeune; Lucie Anastassiou Kazakhstan; Eduard Yechshenko; Assem Orynbay

== Junior medalists ==
=== Men ===
Event	Gold	Silver	Bronze
Trap	Gianmarco Barletta (ITA)	Emanuele Iezzi (ITA)	Juho Johannes Mäkelä (FIN)
Trap team	India; Aryavansh Tyagi; Shapath Bharadwaj; Shardul Vihan	Italy; Emanuele Iezzi; Gianmarco Barletta; Edoardo Antonioli	United States; Lance Patrick Thompson; Matthew Christian Kutz; Emilio Ernest Carvalho
Skeet	Benjamin Joseph Keller (USA)	Mitchell Brooker-Smith (GBR)	Martin Včelička (CZE)
Skeet team	United States; Jordan Douglas Sapp; Aidin Burns; Benjamin Joseph Keller	Finland; Eino Akseli Peltomäki; Ukko-Pekka Mäkinen; Oskari Aatos Juhani Lehtimäki	India; Bhavtegh Singh Gill; Abhay Singh Sekhon; Ritu Raj Bundela

=== Women ===
Event	Gold	Silver	Bronze
Trap	Kiara Sioux-Lin Dean (AUS)	Han Ting (CHN)	Breanna Maree Dowse Collins (AUS)
Trap team	Italy; Marika Patera; Giorgia Lenticchia; Sofia Littame	Czech Republic; Lea Kučerová; Zina Hrdlicková; Martina Matejková	Australia; Kiara Sioux-Lin Dean; Breanna Maree Dowse Collins; Molly Ruth Bretag
Skeet	Sophie Herrmann (GBR)	Areeba Khan (IND)	Raveca-Maria Islai (ROU)
Skeet team	China; Wang Yingzi; Wang Dan; Zhou Yaojia	United States; Alishia Fayth Layne; Mikena Grace Fulton; Julia Florence Nelson	Slovakia; Adela Supekova; Adriana Zajickova; Miroslava Hockova

=== Mixed ===
Event	Gold	Silver	Bronze
Trap team	Italy; Gianmarco Barletta; Marika Patera	Italy; Emanuele Iezzi; Sofia Littame	Finland; Juho Johannes Mäkelä; Sara Nummela Spain; Juan Antonio García; Paula Morcillo
Skeet team	Great Britain; Mitchell Brooker-Smith; Sophie Herrmann	China; Zhao Haloei; Wang Dan	India; Bhavtegh Singh Gill; Muffaddal Zahra Deesawala Italy; Andrea Galardini; Damiana Paolacci

== Medal tables ==
=== Seniors ===
Rank	Nation	Gold	Silver	Bronze	Total
1	Italy (ITA)	4	2	1	7
2	Great Britain (GBR)	2	3	0	5
3	United States (USA)	2	2	1	5
4	France (FRA)	1	0	1	2
5	Egypt (EGY)	1	0	0	1
6	Czech Republic (CZE)	0	1	1	2
7	Finland (FIN)	0	1	0	1
7	Spain (ESP)	0	1	0	1
9	Australia (AUS)	0	0	2	2
10	China (CHN)	0	0	1	1
10	Chinese Taipei (TPE)	0	0	1	1
10	Kazakhstan (KAZ)	0	0	1	1
10	Qatar (QAT)	0	0	1	1
10	Slovakia (SVK)	0	0	1	1
10	Slovenia (SLO)	0	0	1	1
Totals (15 entries)		10	10	12	32

=== Juniors ===
Rank	Nation	Gold	Silver	Bronze	Total
1	Italy (ITA)	3	3	0	6
2	United States (USA)	2	1	1	4
3	Great Britain (GBR)	2	1	0	3
4	China (CHN)	1	2	0	3
5	India (IND)	1	1	2	4
6	Australia (AUS)	1	0	2	3
7	Finland (FIN)	0	1	2	3
8	Czech Republic (CZE)	0	1	1	2
9	Romania (ROU)	0	0	1	1
9	Slovakia (SVK)	0	0	1	1
9	Spain (ESP)	0	0	1	1
Totals (11 entries)		10	10	11	31

== Olympic quotas ==
Nation	Men's		Women's		Total
Nation	Trap	Skeet	Trap	Skeet	Total
Australia			1		1
Great Britain	1				1
Chinese Taipei	1				1
Egypt		1			1
France			1		1
India	1				1
Italy				1	1
Qatar		1			1
Slovakia			1	1	2
Spain			1		1
Sweden		1			1
Ukraine				1	1
United States	1	1		1	3
Total: 13 countries	4	4	4	4	16
