= 1988 European Shotgun Championships =

1988 European Shooting Championships
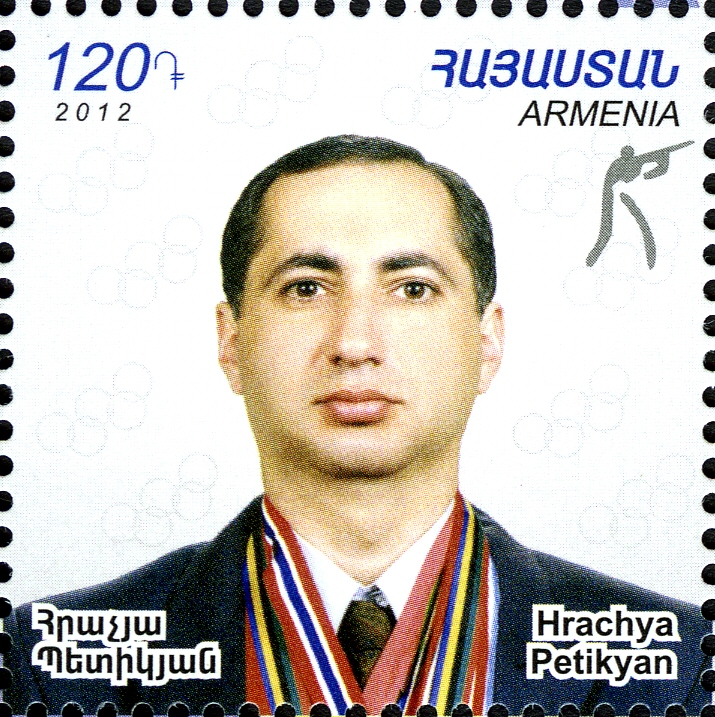
- Hrachya Petikyan, Armenian winner in rifle.
- Host city: Istanbul, Turkey
- Level: Senior
- Events: 18

The 1988 European Shooting Championships was the 34th edition (including the European Shooting Championships), of the global shotgun competition, European Shotgun Championships, organised by the International Shooting Sport Federation.

== Winners ==
Events was 18, 10 men and 8 women.

=== Men ===
Event	Winner	Country
Air rifle	Hrachya Petikyan	Soviet Union
Air Pistol	Igor Basinski	Soviet Union
Air rifle, team	(Rajmond Debevec, Sacic, Goran Maksimovic)	Yugoslavia
Air pistol, team	(Igor Basinski, Alexander Melentjew, Sergej Pyschanow)	Soviet Union
Running disk	Jean-Luc Tricoire	France
Running disc, team	(Lubos Racansky, Tesar, Jan Kermiet)	Soviet Union
Trap	Albano Pera	Italy
Skeet	Jean-Francois Dellac	France
Trap, team	(Alexander Lavrinenko etc.)	Soviet Union
Skeet, team	(Leos Hlavacek, Petr Malek, Lubos Adamec)	Soviet Union

=== Women ===
Event	Winner	Country
Air rifle	Eva Joo	Hungary
Air Pistol	Liselotte Breker	Germany
Air rifle, team	(Eva Joo, Eva Forian, Gelencser)	Hungary
Air pistol, team	(Marina Dobrantschewa, Smirnowa, L. Swetkowa)	Soviet Union
Trap	Daina Gudzinevičiūtė	Soviet Union
Skeet	Svetlana Demina	Soviet Union
Trap, team		Soviet Union
Skeet, team		Soviet Union

== See also ==
- European Shooting Confederation
- International Shooting Sport Federation
- List of medalists at the European Shooting Championship
