= 1958 European Shotgun Championships =

- Host city: Geneva, Switzerland
- Level: Senior
- Events: 4 men (2 individual + 2 team); 2 women (individual)

The 1958 European Shotgun Championships was the 3rd edition of the global shotgun competition, European Shotgun Championships, organised by the International Shooting Sport Federation.

== Results ==
=== Men ===
Event	Gold		Silver		Bronze	
Event	Athletes	Pts	Athletes	Pts	Athletes	Pts
Skeet	(Switzerland) Ernest Mayer		(France) Jacques Arnavielhe		(France) Claude Foussier	
Skeet, team	France; Jacques Arnavielhe; Claude Foussier......		United States............		Sweden............	
Trap	(Italy) Luigi Rossi	193	(France) Jean Aubin		(West Germany) Heinrich von der Mühle	
Trap, team	West Germany; Heinrich von der Mühle.........		Italy; Luigi Rossi.........		France; Jean Aubin.........	

=== Women ===
Event	Gold		Silver		Bronze	
Event	Athlete	Pts	Athlete	Pts	Athlete	Pts
Skeet	(United States) Carola Mandel		(Belgium) Nina Geuens		(France) Françoise Vormus	
Trap	(Greece) Olga Dzawara	136	(France) Marie Greuzard	105	(France) Berlaimont	80

== Medal table ==
Host country

#	Country	1st place, gold medalist(s)	2nd place, silver medalist(s)	3rd place, bronze medalist(s)	Tot.
1	France	1	3	4	8
2	United States	1	1	0	2
2	Italy	1	1	0	2
4	Germany	1	0	1	2
5	Greece	1	0	0	1
5	Switzerland	1	0	0	1
7	Belgium	0	1	0	1
8	Sweden	0	0	1	1

== See also ==
- European Shooting Confederation
- International Shooting Sport Federation
- List of medalists at the European Shotgun Championships
