= Vanesa Hocková =

Slovak sport shooter (born 2000)

Personal information
- Nationality: Slovak
- Born: 20 January 2000 (age 26) Trnava, Slovakia
- Height: 155 cm (5 ft 1 in)
- Weight: 64 kg (141 lb)

Sport
- Country: Slovakia
- Sport: Shooting
- Event: Skeet
Medal record
World Championships
Bronze medal – third place	2022 Cairo	Skeet team
Bronze medal – third place	2023 Baku	Skeet team
European Games
Silver medal – second place	2023 Kraków-Małopolska	Skeet team
European Championships
Gold medal – first place	2024 Lonato del Garda	Skeet team
Silver medal – second place	2023 Osijek	Skeet team
Bronze medal – third place	2022 Larnaca	Skeet team
Bronze medal – third place	2025 Chateauroux	Skeet Team

Vanesa Hocková (born 20 January 2000) is a Slovak skeet shooter.

Vanesa Hocková was born on 20 January 2000 in Trnava. She was competing in swimming until the age of 12, when she switched to shooting.

Her best individual career result is the fourth place at the 2022 World Championships in Osijek, which qualified Hocková for participation in the 2024 Summer Olympics.

Hocková was a part of the Slovak women skeet team which placed third at the 2022 ISSF World Cup, 2022 European Shotgun Championships and 2023 ISSF World Shooting Championships, second at the 2023 European Shotgun Championships and 2023 European Games and won gold at the 2024 European Shotgun Championships.
