= Valerio Grazini =

Italian sport shooter (born 1992)

Personal information
- Nationality: Italian
- Born: 26 September 1992 (age 33) Viterbo, Italy
- Height: 1.80 m (5 ft 11 in)
- Weight: 84 kg (185 lb)

Sport
- Country: Italy
- Sport: Shooting
- Event: Trap
- Club: C.S. Carabinieri
Medal record
Men's shooting
Representing Italy
World Championships
Gold medal – first place	2014 Granada	Trap team
Gold medal – first place	2017 Moscow	Trap team
Gold medal – first place	2019 Lonato del Garda	Trap team
Silver medal – second place	2015 Lonato del Gard	Trap team
Bronze medal – third place	2018 Changwon	Trap team
European Games
Silver medal – second place	2019 Minsk	Trap
Universiade
Gold medal – first place	2013 Kazan	Trap team
Gold medal – first place	2015 Gwangju	Trap
Silver medal – second place	2013 Kazan	Trap
Silver medal – second place	2015 Gwangju	Trap team

Valerio Grazini (born 26 September 1992) is an Italian sport shooter.

He participated, from 2009 to 2019, at nine editions of the ISSF World Shooting Championships and won six medals at international senior level and five with the team.
