= 2023 European Shotgun Championships =

- Dates: 8–27 September
- Host city: Osijek, Croatia
- Level: Senior
- Events: 20
- Participation: 415 athletes from 41 nations

The 2023 European Shotgun Championships is the 53rd edition of the global shotgun competition, European Shotgun Championships, organised by the European Shooting Confederation.

The championships also served as a qualification event for 2024 Summer Olympics.

== Senior ==
=== Men ===
Event	Gold	Silver	Bronze'
Skeet	Charalambos Chalkiadakis; Greece	Marlon Attard; Malta	Tammaro Cassandro; Italy
Skeet Team	Italy; Tammaro Cassandro; Elia Sdruccioli; Gabriele Rossetti	Czech Republic; Radek Prokop; Jakub Tomeček; Tomáš Nýdrle	Germany; Sven Korte; Christopher Honkomp; Vincent Haaga
Trap	Giovanni Cernogoraz; Croatia	Mauro De Filippis; Italy	Sebastien Guerrero; France
Trap Team	Great Britain; Aaron Heading; Steven Scott; Nathan Hales	Czech Republic; Jiří Lipták; Jan Palacký; David Kostelecký	Italy; Mauro De Filippis; Massimo Fabbrizi; Giovanni Pellielo

=== Women ===
Event	Gold	Silver	Bronze
Skeet	Danka Barteková; Slovakia	Diana Bacosi; Italy	Amber Rutter; Great Britain
Skeet Team	Italy; Diana Bacosi; Martina Bartolomei; Simona Scocchetti	Slovakia; Vanesa Hocková; Monika Štibravá; Lucia Kopčanová	Great Britain; Alexandra Skeggs; Emily Jane Hibbs; Amber Rutter
Trap	Maria Coelho de Barros; Portugal	Silvana Stanco; Italy	Fátima Gálvez; Spain
Trap Team	Finland; Satu Mäkelä-Nummela; Noora Antikainen; Mopsi Veromaa	Slovakia; Nikola Molnárová; Jana Špotáková; Zuzana Štefečeková	Italy; Jessica Rossi; Maria Lucia Palmitessa; Silvana Stanco

=== Mixed ===
Event	Gold	Silver	Bronze
Skeet Team	Great Britain; Ben Llewellin; Amber Rutter	Czech Republic; Tomáš Nýdrle; Martina Kučerová	Italy; Tammaro Cassandro; Diana Bacosi
Trap Team	Italy; Massimo Fabbrizi; Jessica Rossi	Slovakia; Erik Varga; Zuzana Štefečeková	Great Britain; Nathan Hales; Lucy Charlotte Hall

== Junior ==
=== Men ===
Event	Gold	Silver	Bronze'
Skeet	Panagiotis Gerochristos; Greece	Andreas Pontikis; Cyprus	Andrea Galardini; Italy
Skeet Team	Italy; Marco Coco; Francesco Bernardini; Andrea Galardini	Finland; Lassi Kauppinen; Eino Peltomaeki; Ukko-Pekka Maekinen	Germany; Linus Wienker; Tim Krause; Luis Lange
Trap	Francesco-Alessandro Tiganescu; Romania	Adrian Lopez Diaz; Spain	Emanuele Iezzi; Italy
Trap Team	Italy; Matteo Dambrosi; Valentino Curti; Emanuele Iezzi	Spain; Adrian Lopez Diaz; Jon Lecanda Alcibar; Daniel Fernandez de Vicente	Turkey; Huseyin Ozmen; Erdogan Akkaya; Suleyman Guvercin

=== Women ===
Event	Gold	Silver	Bronze
Skeet	Elizaveta Boiarshinova; Georgia	Miroslava Hocková; Slovakia	Madeleine Zarina Russell; Great Britain
Skeet Team	Italy; Damiana Paolacci; Viola Picciolli; Sara Bongini	Slovakia; Adela Supeková; Adriana Zajíčková; Miroslava Hocková	Great Britain; Phoebe Grace Bodley-Scott; Sophie Herrmann; Madeleine Zarina Russell
Trap	Noelia Pontes Villarrubia; Spain	Zina Hrdličková; Czech Republic	Sofia Littame; Italy
Trap Team	Italy; Sofia Littame; Maria Teresa Maccioni; Giorgia Lenticchia	Czech Republic; Zina Hrdličková; Tereza Zavisková; Martina Matejková	Great Britain; Madeleine Purser; Tegan Hart; Leah Southall

=== Mixed ===
Event	Gold	Silver	Bronze
Skeet Team	Italy; Andrea Galardini; Sara Bongini	Ukraine; Ivan Ragulia; Valeriia Bartysheva	Slovakia; Ladislav Nemeth; Miroslava Hocková
Trap Team	Italy; Valentino Curti; Giorgia Lenticchia	Czech Republic; Jacub Kostelecky; Martina Matějková	Spain; Daniel Fernandez De Vicente; Noelia Pontes Villarrubia

== Medal table ==
=== Senior ===
* Host nation (Croatia)

Rank	Nation	Gold	Silver	Bronze	Total
1	Italy	3	3	4	10
2	Great Britain	2	0	3	5
3	Slovakia	1	3	0	4
4	Croatia	1	0	0	1
4	Finland	1	0	0	1
4	Greece	1	0	0	1
4	Portugal	1	0	0	1
8	Czech Republic	0	3	0	3
9	Malta	0	1	0	1
10	France	0	0	1	1
10	Germany	0	0	1	1
10	Spain	0	0	1	1
Totals (12 entries)		10	10	10	30

=== Junior ===
* Host nation (Croatia)

Rank	Nation	Gold	Silver	Bronze	Total
1	Italy	6	0	3	9
2	Spain	1	2	1	4
3	Georgia	1	0	0	1
3	Greece	1	0	0	1
3	Romania	1	0	0	1
6	Czech Republic	0	3	0	3
7	Slovakia	0	2	1	3
8	Cyprus	0	1	0	1
8	Finland	0	1	0	1
8	Ukraine	0	1	0	1
11	Great Britain	0	0	3	3
12	Germany	0	0	1	1
12	Turkey	0	0	1	1
Totals (13 entries)		10	10	10	30

== Olympic quotas ==
Nation	Men's		Women's		Total
Nation	Trap	Skeet	Trap	Skeet	Total
France	1				1
Germany				1	1
Greece		1			1
Portugal			1		1
Total: 2 countries	1	1	1	1	4
