= Kenneth Aspestrand =

Norwegian trick shooter with a shotgun

Kenneth Aspestrand (born 1972) is a Norwegian trick shooter with a shotgun. He has shot actively since 1999, and trains on his own private shooting range.

== Merits ==
- Current World Record holder of 9 clay targets shot in 1.88 seconds
- Current World Record holder of 7 clay targets shot upside down
- 3rd place European Shotgun Championship
- 1st and 2nd place Nordic Shotgun Championship
- 21 Norwegian Shotgun Championship medals
