= Luigi Rossi (sport shooter) =

Italian sport shooter

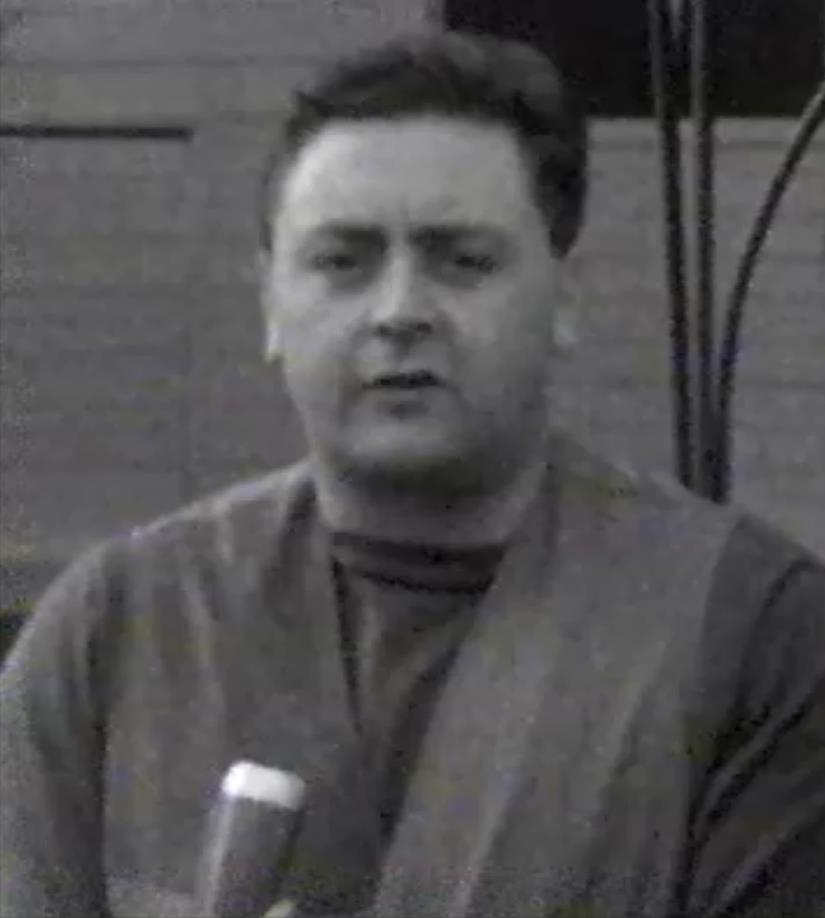
- Luigi Rossi in 1959.

Personal information
- Nickname: Gigi
- National team: Italy
- Born: 8 June 1933 (age 93) Trento, Italy

Sport
- Sport: Shooting
- Event: Trap
Medal record
Individual
Event	1st	2nd	3rd
European Championships	2	0	0
Team
Event	1st	2nd	3rd
European Championships	1	1	0

Luigi Rossi (born 8 June 1933) is a former Italian sport shooter twice European Champion at individual senior level.

== Achievements ==
Year	Competition	Venue	Rank	Event	Score
1958	European Championships	(Switzerland) Geneva	1st	Trap	193
1958	European Championships	(Switzerland) Geneva	2nd	Trap team	
1960	European Championships	(Spain) Barcelona	1st	Trap	195
1960	European Championships	(Spain) Barcelona	1st	Trap team	
