= Lucy Hall (sport shooter) =

British Olympic trap shooter

Personal information
- Full name: Lucy Charlotte Hall
- Born: 2 September 2003 (age 23) Malton, England

Sport
- Sport: Olympic trap shooting
Medal record
Women's shooting
Representing Great Britain
World Championships
Silver medal – second place	2022 Osijek	Mixed team trap
European Championships
Silver medal – second place	2022 Larnaca	Trap
Bronze medal – third place	2022 Larnaca	Team trap
Bronze medal – third place	2023 Osijek	Mixed team trap
European Games
Silver medal – second place	2023 Kraków-Małopolska	Mixed team trap

Lucy Charlotte Hall (born 2 September 2003) is a British Olympic trap shooter who had gained a silver medal at the 2022 European Shooting Championships.

== Life ==
Hall was born in Malton in 2003. She was introduced to shooting by her father and grandfather. The family runs a gun shop in York. She began shooting at age ten and in the following year she set herself ambitions including the Olympics and a gold medal. She was tall and that gave her some advantages with using a full sized gun.

Her grandfather had taken her to an experience day and it worked. In 2016 her talents and ambitions were recognised when she joined the British Shooting's Pathway Programme, and its Talent Academy. In 2019 she was enrolled in the National Academy and two years later she was promoted to British Shooting's World Class Programme.

In 2021 as COVID-19 restrictions were ending, she went to Croatia to compete at the Junior European Championships. It was her only event that year and she won.

She gained a silver medal at the 2022 European Shooting Championships in Larnaca in Cyprus which also guaranteed that the UK would be represented in the Olympics. She was beaten by Silvana Stanco from Italy and her win also gained Italy an Olympic place.

In 2023 she obtained a World Cup Gold Medal in Cyprus. The event was again in Larnaca and she beat the Chinese shooter Wu Cuicui. The third place was taken be the Australian shooter Penny Smith.

Hall was one of six UK athletes who were named for shooting events at the 2024 Paris Olympics.
