= Li Wenyi =

Chinese politician

- 李文宜
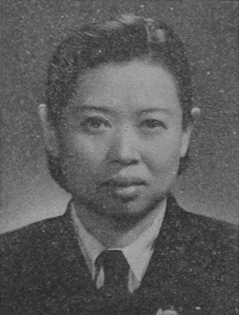
- Born: 1903; Wuhan, Qing China
- Died: 1997 (aged 93-94); People's Republic of China

Li Wenyi (李文宜 1903–1997), born in Wuhan, Hubei, graduated from Hubei Nü Zi Shi Fan Xue Xiao (Hubei Girls’ School of Education), was a Chinese woman activist and politician. Her activism began as early as 1922 as she started to get involved in the Women's Movement Alliance (WMA) to advocate for women's equal rights and political participation in China, promoting female labor protection and education equality. In 1926, she joined Kuomintang (KMT) and Chinese Communist Party (CCP), and was then expelled by both in 1927, but her contacts with both was maintained throughout her activism. When the Second Sino-Japanese War broke out in 1938, Li Wenyi joined a local women's resistance group to defend her hometown. In 1943, under CCP's commission, Li Wenyi traveled to Kunming, Yunnan and developed her left-wing activism there, founding a women's press, a women's reading group, and academic seminars to educate local women. During the Civil War (1945–1949), Li Wenyi, along with her colleagues, supported the CCP's establishment of a new China and joined the national All-China Women's Federation (ACWF) upon the founding of the People's Republic of China (PRC). Since the establishment of the PRC, Li Wenyi had held various positions in the ACWF, and served various roles in terms of labor protection and within the Democratic League.

== Early activism (1922–1943) ==
=== Preliminary attempt ===
In 1922, Li Wenyi emerged as a prominent figure within the Women's Movement Alliance (WMA), a group of organizations and activists focusing on women's rights and gender equality, as a staunch advocate for democracy and women's rights, consistently pressing for women's suffrage and political participation. At the early stage of her activism, Li Wenyi's affiliations with the CCP and the Communist Youth League provided crucial support and guidance for her various political activities, particularly within the realms of the democratic movement and women's rights advocacy. Within the Hubei branch of the WMA, Li Wenyi spearheaded several crucial initiatives alongside fellow women activists. These initiatives encompassed calls for the repeal of the Police Law (also known as the enforcement law or criminal law, a body of legal principles and regulations that govern the activities and conducts of law enforcement agencies and officers), the inclusion of women in electoral legislation, and the incorporation of provisions safeguarding women's labor rights in the Labor Protection Law.

=== Start of a political career ===
In 1926, Li Wenyi embarked on her political career by joining the KMT and the CCP. During a time of political volatility in China with the KMT and the CCP navigating a complex and often contentious relationship with each other, her work alongside prominent communist leaders Deng Yingchao and Cai Chang in the CCP women's committee, as part of the First United Front during the National Revolution, was crucial in the fight against foreign imperialism and domestic warlords.

However, Li Wenyi's journey was fraught with challenges. In 1927, she was persecuted by the KMT due to her communist affiliations and faced a controversial expulsion from the CCP. Officially, her expulsion from the CCP was for not seeking permission for a personal task. However, it was later revealed that internal political struggles within the CCP were the actual cause.

Despite these setbacks, Li Wenyi's commitment to political activism remained steadfast. During the Second Sino-Japanese War in 1938, she was actively involved in women's resistance organizations in Hubei. She also played a significant role in the defense of Wuhan, joining other female activists from across the country.

Li Wenyi's influence continued to be felt in the 1940s. In 1943, in recognition of her political experience, she was invited by Hua Gang and Zhou Xinmin, appointed by the CCP, to help establish the Yunnan branch of the Democratic League in Kunming.

== Main activism and political activities in Kunming (1943–1946) ==
=== Arrival in Kunming ===
Zhou was the chair of The Kunming League of Democratic Political Groups. In August 1943, he invited Li Wenyi to join the League as an organizer. Li Wenyi took that role due to her prior experience of being an underground organizer for the CCP, moving from Hubei to Kunming. Her main task was to bring together women to the League so that they could grow in size and power.

In 1943, Li Wenyi was also a participant of the Southwest Central Research Society meetings that hosted many professors and others from Kunming to talk about the CCP policies and other internal and external issues in the academic setting. As women’s groups in Kunming were heavily related to academics, Li Wenyi's involvement in the Research Society assisted her task in the League of uniting women in Kunming.

=== A breakthrough: The Women’s Day Celebration, 1944 ===
Li Wenyi, with no political connections in Kunming, aimed to start a left-wing women's movement by first making 100 friends before Women’s Day in 1944. Her High Court job in Yunnan led her to befriend Yang Suhui, a female colleague, who introduced her to her friends. By late 1943, Li Wenyi had formed a women's reading group of about 30 members. To expand this group, she approached Zhong Shaoqin, director-general of the local Young Women's Christian Association (YWCA), who agreed to merge the reading group with the YWCA, renaming it as the Career Women's Community (CWC). However, the expansion faced challenges as the YWCA office relocated shortly after the merge, hindering member attendance, and by Women’s Day 1944, the Community had only 46 members.

The 1944 Women’s Day celebration marked a significant breakthrough for Li Wenyi to broaden her influence and build political rapport. Li Wenyi initially planned to publish a special Women’s Day newspaper issue and she had successfully secured space in several major Kunming newspapers, including Saodang Bao (扫荡报), Guomin Ribao (国民日报), Yunnan Ribao (云南日报), Zhengyi Bao (正义报). Learning that Zhang Jinghua, the women leader of the KMT, had a similar celebration idea, Li Wenyi shared her planned articles for the Guomin Ribao (国民日报) with the KMT to avoid conflict and foster good relations. This gesture won her favor with the KMT, leading to her drafting the opening speech for Gu Yingqiu, the governor's wife, and an invitation for the CWC to attend the KMT’s Women’s Day event. Following Women’s Day, the Community's membership nearly doubled, approaching 100 members.

=== Turning point: Break from YWCA, move toward CWA ===
However, the CWC’s success and popularity entailed resentment from the YWCA, resulting in its exclusion from the YWCA’s decision-making. In response, the CWC was renamed as the Joy Group to assert its independence without causing disturbance within the YWCA. Within a year, the Joy Group held over a dozen public talks and seminars to educate local women, featuring renowned scholars from the Southwest Central Research Society, and the financial cost was minimal thanks to Li Wenyi’s academic network. By the end of 1944, the Joy Group had recruited 117 members and engaged broadly with social and political issues, demonstrating a left-wing political stance, and they even organized a nurse-training class at the YWCA’s dormitory.

Constantly working for the YWCA without being paid or included in the decision-making process, the Joy Group broke from the YWCA and lost its legal status, and therefore couldn't get involved in Kunming’s public activities alone. Subsequently, Li Wenyi was commissioned to establish a Yunnan branch of the China Women’s Association (CWA)--formed under the United-Front framework during the Second Sino-Japanese War (1937–1945), affiliated with the CCP’s South Bureau and consisting of women activists from a wide range of organizations and parties, which granted legal status to the Joy Group. The Yunnan Women's Association and its official publication, Funü Xunkan (妇女旬刊), were officially registered in Kunming. This move facilitated Li Wenyi's network development with local left-wing women activists and female students, and the Association also strengthened its institutional and political connections with Chongqing by its publication.

After her three fruitful years in Kunming, Li Wenyi as well as her colleagues arrived in major cities controlled by the KMT (Beijing, Nanjing, Shanghai) during the Civil War (1945–1949) and continued their activims and organzings in the cities.

== Late stage activism (1946–1949) ==
The Civil War was characterized by administrative turmoil, military threats, and economic decline. In KMT-controlled urban areas such as Beijing, Nanjing, Shanghai, political activists faced persecution for suspected affiliations with the CCP, and independent women activists struggled to continue their work amid the political chaos. In CCP-liberated areas, the CCP welcomed women activists who fled from KMT-controlled regions. Henceforth, leaders of the CWA, including Li Dequan, Cao Mengjun, Xu Guangping, and Li Wenyi, who had been active in KMT-controlled urban areas, traveled to CCP-controlled Xibaipo and Shenyang to support the CCP in establishing a new government.

In April 1949, six months before the founding of the People's Republic of China, the All-China Women's Federation (ACWF) was established in Beijing. Li Wenyi, along with other prominent CWA leaders like Li Dequan, Shi Liang, and Liu-Wang Liming, was elected into the executive and standing committees of the ACWF. The Federation's inaugural resolution emphasized the unification of Chinese women against the KMT as the sole path to women's liberation and the construction of a new China.

== 1949 and beyond ==
After the establishment of the People's Republic of China, Li Wenyi held various positions, including deputy director of the Office of the Ministry of Labor of the Central People's Government, deputy director of the Labor Protection Department, and Director of the Labor Protection Research Institute; a Standing Committee member, Executive Committee member, and Vice Chairperson of the ACWF; Honorary Vice President, deputy director of the Consultative Committee of the China Democratic League, and a Standing Committee member in the first, second, and third sessions of the Central Committee of the Democratic League, as well as vice president in the fourth and fifth sessions.
