= Shooting at the 2018 Commonwealth Games – Women's skeet =

Women's skeet at the 2018 Commonwealth Games
- Venue: Belmont Shooting Centre, Brisbane
- Dates: 8 April
- Competitors: 11

Medalists
gold medal	Andri Eleftheriou	Cyprus
silver medal	Amber Hill	England
bronze medal	Panagiota Andreou	Cyprus

The Women's skeet event at the 2018 Commonwealth Games was held on 8 April at the Belmont Shooting Centre, Brisbane. There was a qualification round to determine the final participants, after which a final followed on the same day.

== Results ==
=== Qualification ===
Rank	Name	1	2	ex 50	3	Total	Notes
1	Panayiota Andreou (CYP)	25	25	50	24	74	Q
2	Saniya Shaikh (IND)	25	23	48	23	71	Q QS-off:+2
3	Aislin Jones (AUS)	23	25	48	23	71	Q QS-off:+1
4	Amber Hill (ENG)	23	23	46	23	69	Q QS-off:+8
5	Emily Hibbs (ENG)	22	24	46	23	69	Q QS-off:+7
6	Andri Eleftheriou (CYP)	23	23	46	23	69	Q QS-off:+5
7	Chloe Tipple (NZL)	23	23	46	22	68	
8	Maheshwari Chauhan (IND)	24	22	46	22	68	
9	Laura Coles (AUS)	23	22	45	22	67	
10	Alexandra Skeggs (NIR)	21	23	44	18	62	
11	Michelle Elliot (BAR)	23	21	44	18	62	

=== Final ===
Rank	Name	Stage 1 & ex 20	Stage 2	ex 30	Stage 3	ex 40	Stage 4	ex 50	Stage 5	ex 60	Final Score	Notes
1st place, gold medalist(s)	Andri Eleftheriou (CYP)	17	9	26	8	34	9	43	9	52	52ex60	GR
2nd place, silver medalist(s)	Amber Hill (ENG)	17	8	25	8	33	8	41	8	49	49ex60	
3rd place, bronze medalist(s)	Panayiota Andreou (CYP)	16	9	25	9	34	6	40	—	—	40ex50	
4	Saniya Shaikh (IND)	15	9	24	8	32	—	—	—	—	32ex40	
5	Emily Hibbs (ENG)	17	7	24	—	—	—	—	—	—	24ex30	
6	Aislin Jones (AUS)	13	—	—	—	—	—	—	—	—	13ex20	
