= Emily Hibbs =

English sports shooter

Emily Jane Hibbs
Personal information
- Nationality: British
- Born: 1 June 1998 (age 28) Poole, England

Sport
- Sport: Shooting
- Event: Women's Skeet
Medal record
Women's shooting
Representing Great Britain
European Championships
Gold medal – first place	2022 Larnaca	Skeet Team Women
Bronze medal – third place	2023 Osijek	Skeet Team Women

Emily Jane Hibbs (born 1 June 1998) is an English sports shooter born in Poole who competed in Shooting at the 2018 Commonwealth Games – Women's skeet.

She won a gold medal in the Skeet Team Women event at the 2022 European Shotgun Championships. She also won a bronze medal in the Skeet Team Women event at the 2023 European Shotgun Championships, for which she holds the British Skeet Team Women record of 349 along with teammates Amber Rutter and Alexandra Skeggs.
