= Alexandra Hayman-Joyce =

Northern Irish sports shooter

Personal information
- Full name: Alexandra Anne Hayman-Joyce
- Nationality: British, Irish
- Born: Alexandra Anne Skeggs; 21 October 1982 (age 43)

Sport
- Sport: Shooting
- Events: Skeet Women, Skeet Mixed Team, Skeet Team Women
Medal record
Women's shooting
Representing Great Britain
European Championships
Bronze medal – third place	2023 Osijek	Skeet Team Women
ISSF Grand Prix
Silver medal – second place	Granada 2022	Skeet Women

Alexandra Anne Hayman-Joyce (née Skeggs, born 21 October 1982) is a Northern Irish sports shooting athlete who competed in Women's Skeet at the 2018 Commonwealth Games.

== Representing United Kingdom ==
Hayman-Joyce made her ISSF World Cup debut representing GBR in 2019, alongside her Commonwealth Games teammate Kirsty Barr who competes in the Women's Trap event.

In 2022, she won a silver medal at the ISSF Grand Prix in Granada. She won the bronze medal in the Skeet Team Women event at the 2023 European Shotgun Championships, for which she also holds the British Skeet Team Women record of 349 along with teammates Amber Rutter and Emily Hibbs.

Between 2019 and 2024 she competed in 14 World Cups, with her highest finishes a 4th place at the 2023 Almaty World Cup in the Skeet Mixed Team event and 4th place at the 2022 Changwon World Cup in the Skeet Team Women event.

== Representing Ireland ==
Since 2025 Hayman-Joyce has represented Ireland, making her first appearance for the country at the 2025 Nicosia World Cup.
