= Shooting at the 2018 Commonwealth Games – Men's skeet =

Men's skeet at the 2018 Commonwealth Games
- Venue: Belmont Shooting Centre, Brisbane
- Dates: 8–9 April
- Competitors: 15

Medalists
gold medal	Georgios Achilleos	Cyprus
silver medal	Ben Llewellin	Wales
bronze medal	Gareth McAuley	Northern Ireland

The Men's Skeet event at the 2018 Commonwealth Games was held on 8–9 April at the Belmont Shooting Centre, Brisbane. The winner was Cyprus' Georgios Achellios.

== Results ==
=== Qualification ===
Rank	Name	1	2	ex 50 (Day 1)	3	ex 75	4	ex 100	5	Total	Notes
1	Georgios Achilleos (CYP)	24	25	49	25	74	24	98	25	123	Q, =GR
2	Ben Llewellin (WAL)	24	25	49	25	74	25	99	23	122	Q QS-off:+4
3	Jack Fairclough (ENG)	25	24	49	25	74	24	98	24	122	Q QS-off:+3
4	Gareth McAuley (NIR)	22	25	47	25	72	24	96	23	119	Q QS-off:+8
5	Karl Killander (ENG)	23	21	44	25	69	25	94	25	119	Q QS-off:+7
6	Smit Singh (IND)	21	25	46	25	71	24	95	24	119	Q QS-off:+1
7	Paul Adams (AUS)	23	24	47	24	71	23	94	24	118	
8	Michael Maskell (BAR)	23	25	48	24	72	23	95	23	118	
9	James Bolding (AUS)	23	24	47	23	70	23	93	24	117	
10	Sheeraz Sheihk (IND)	25	23	48	22	70	23	93	24	117	
11	Usman Chand (PAK)	25	24	49	23	72	23	95	22	117	
12	Marlon Attard (MLT)	25	24	49	25	74	19	93	23	116	
13	George Kazakos (CYP)	22	23	45	24	69	25	94	22	116	
14	Michell Meers (NFI)	16	19	35	16	51	18	69	22	91	
15	Brancker South (NFI)	21	12	33	18	51	18	69	17	86	

=== Final ===
Rank	Name	Stage 1 & ex 20	Stage 2	ex 30	Stage 3	ex 40	Stage 4	ex 50	Stage 5	ex 60	Final Score	Notes
1st place, gold medalist(s)	Georgios Achilleos (CYP)	19	10	29	10	39	9	48	9	57	57ex60	GR
2nd place, silver medalist(s)	Ben Llewellin (WAL)	20	10	30	8	38	10	48	8	56	56ex60	
3rd place, bronze medalist(s)	Gareth McAuley (NIR)	20	9	29	8	37	8	45	—	—	45ex50	
4	Karl Killander (ENG)	18	10	28	9	37	—	—	—	—	37ex40	
5	Jack Fairclough (ENG)	17	9	26	—	—	—	—	—	—	26ex30	
6	Smit Singh (IND)	15	—	—	—	—	—	—	—	—	15ex20	
