= Herman Liu =

Chinese educator and civic leader

Herman Liu (Liu Zhan'en)
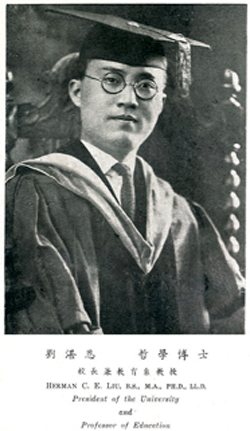
- Born: 1886; Hanyang District, Hubei, China
- Died: 7 April 1938 (aged 52); Shanghai, China
- Cause of death: Assassination
- Education: Soochow University (1918); University of Chicago; Teachers College, Columbia University (PhD)
- Known for: President of the University of Shanghai
- Spouse: Liu-Wang Liming

Herman Chan-En Liu or Liu Zhan'en (1886 – April 7, 1938) was an educator and civic leader in China.

== Early life and education ==
Liu was born in Hanyang, Hubei. He earned a bachelor's degree at Soochow University in 1918, and a master's degree from the University of Chicago. He was awarded a Ph.D. degree with the dissertation "Nonverbal intelligence tests for use in China" at Teachers College, Columbia University.

== Career ==
Liu returned to China in 1922, and was the national educational secretary for the YMCA in China. From 1928 to 1938, he was the first Chinese president of University of Shanghai. He attended international conferences in the United States, Switzerland and Finland, wrote educational pamphlets, and married fellow educator and activist Liu-Wang Liming.

== Assassination ==
After the 1937 Battle of Nanking, University of Shanghai was in a vital position for information sharing. Liu was assassinated by the Japanese on a bus stop in Shanghai on the date of April 7, 1938, after he secretly transferred Nanjing Massacre photos.
