= Andrea Vescovi =

Italian sport shooter (born 1994)

Personal information
- Nationality: Italian
- Born: 3 November 1994 (age 31) Città di Castello, Italy
- Height: 1.73 m (5 ft 8 in)
- Weight: 70 kg (154 lb)

Sport
- Country: Italy
- Sport: Shooting
- Event: Double trap
- Club: Valtiberiga
Medal record
Men's shooting
Representing Italy
World Championships
Gold medal – first place	2018 Changwon	Double trap team
Bronze medal – third place	2019 Lonato del Garda	Double trap
Universiade
Gold medal – first place	2015 Gwangju	Double trap
Gold medal – first place	2015 Gwangju	Double trap team
ISSF Grand Prix
Gold medal – first place	2019 Lonato del Garda	Double trap team

Andrea Vescovi (born 3 November 1994) is an Italian sport shooter. He participated at the 2018 ISSF World Shooting Championships, winning a gold medal.
