= Liu-Wang Liming =

Chinese feminist

Liu-Wang Liming Frances Willard Liu-Wang
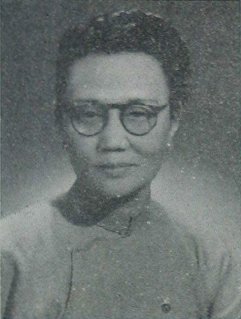
- Liming in 1949
- Born: Wang Liming; 1897; Taihu County, Anhui province, China
- Died: 15 April 1970 (aged 72–73); Shanghai, China
- Spouse: Herman Chan-En Liu
- Children: Three; two sons and a daughter - Guangsheng (1924), Guanghua (1926), and a daughter Guangkun

Liu-Wang Liming (Chinese: 刘王立明; pinyin: Liù-Wáng Lìmíng; 1897 – 15 April 1970; née Wang Liming) was a Chinese feminist, suffragette, and the publisher of the Women's Voice, a biweekly magazine. She organized the Zhan'en Institute for Refugee Children and the Chinese Women's Friendship Association. She was also principal of the West China Women's Vocational School.

A "rightist", she was persecuted by the communists for a long period for her leaning towards pacifists, campaigning until she died in prison in 1970. However, posthumously, in 1980, she was re-recognized by the Chinese Government for her contributions on women's issues.

== Early years ==
She was born in Taihu County, Anhui province. Her father, Wang Langzhong, was a Chinese doctor who died when she was nine years old, putting the family in a penurious state. Her mother was president of an early Woman's Christian Temperance Union (WCTU) branch in China. Though a Confucian, her mother sent her to the Become Beautiful Girls' School (which was opened following American missionaries who had then founded the Taihu Gospel Church). She then moved to the Ruli Academy, a Methodist girls' high school in Jiujiang, Jiangxi. She converted to Christianity. At the age of 12, she unbound her feet, the first girl in her county to do so. After graduation from Jiujiang Ruli Academy, she became a teacher at the school. Under the guidance of the Woman's Christian Temperance Union (WCTU), after obtaining a scholarship she moved to Illinois and studied zoology at Northwestern University. She earned B.S. and M.S. degrees. While in Evanston, she adopted the English name Frances Willard Wong, in honor of Frances Willard, founder of the WCTU. and met her future husband, Herman C.E. Liu (Liu Zhan'en), whom she knew from Jiujiang. She returned to China in 1920. Herman obtained his doctoral degree in education from the Columbia University, whereafter he came back to China and worked with the YMCA. She and Liu Zhan'en married 1 September 1922 after his graduation. They had three children two sons and a daughter- Guangsheng (1924), Guanghua (1926), and a daughter Guangkun (1928). Liu became president of University of Shanghai, but was assassinated in 1938, probably by Japanese militarists.

== Career ==
Upon returning to China, she served as a member of the Committee to Promote the National Assembly (1924). She was a founder of the Shanghai Women's Suffrage Association (1930s) and served as its chair. She also served as the general secretary of the WCTU (Zhonghua Funü Jiezhihui; lit. "Chinese Women's Anti-Drug Association") (1926–1950s). She was one of the few female members of the People's Political Consultative Conference, a government group which promoted public support for the war effort. She successfully managed to get a guarantee written into the Double Fifth Constitution that women would have at least ten percent of the seats in the National Assembly. However, her strong critique of the Nationalist war strategy resulted in her being expelled from the PPC in 1943. Liu-Wang joined the Chinese Democratic League, which favoured democracy and socialism.

She was elected to the Chinese People's Political Consultative Conference's Second, Third, and Fourth National Committees; and represented China at the International Asian Women's Conference (1954). While attending as president of Zhonghua Funü Jiezhihui, she was elected vice-president of the WCTU Congress in West Germany (1956). Labeled a "rightist" in 1957, she was placed in jail in Shanghai for being an alleged spy of the CIA on 1 September 1966 as the Cultural Revolution broke out. Liu-Wang died in a prison labour camp in Shanghai on 15 April 1970 at the age of 74, after serving three and a half years in prison.

== Selected works ==
- Wang, Liming (1934). 中國婦女運動 (Zhongguo Fu Nü Yun Dong; The Chinese women's movement). Shanghai: Shangwu; reprinted Beijing: 中献拓方科技发展 (Beijing zhongxian tuofang keji fazhan), 2012.
