= Panayiota Andreou =

Cypriot sport shooter (born 1995)

Personal information
- Nationality: Cypriot
- Born: 10 November 1995 (age 30) Paralimni, Cyprus
- Height: 1.68 m (5 ft 6 in)
- Weight: 55 kg (121 lb)

Sport
- Country: Cyprus
- Sport: Shooting
- Event: Skeet
- Club: Famagusta Club

Achievements and titles
- World finals: 2011 ISSF Shotgun World Cup — Silver
Medal record
Women's shooting
Representing Cyprus
World Championships
Bronze medal – third place	2018 Changwon	Skeet team
European Championships
Bronze medal – third place	2024 Lonato	Skeet team
Commonwealth Games
Bronze medal – third place	2018 Gold Coast	Skeet

Panayiota Andreou (Greek: Παναγιώτα Ανδρέου, also transliterated Panagiota, born 10 November 1995) is a Cypriot skeet shooter who represented her country at the 2012 Summer Olympics in London, United Kingdom. She is ranked 22nd in the world and shoots for a club in Famagusta.

After qualifying for the games due to a second-place position at the ISSF 2011 Shotgun World Cup in Maribor, she finished 16th in the women's skeet qualifying round with a score of 57 points, failing to qualify for the semi-final.

She participated at the 2018 ISSF World Shooting Championships, winning a medal.

She is the daughter of Antonis Andreou.
