= Derrick Mein =

American sport shooter (born 1985)

Personal information
- Born: 26 August 1985 (age 40) Girard, Kansas, US

Sport
- Sport: Shooting
Medal record
Men's shooting
Representing the United States
World Championships
Gold medal – first place	2022 Osijek	Trap
Gold medal – first place	2023 Baku	Trap team
Silver medal – second place	2023 Baku	Trap mixed team

Derrick Scott Mein is an American sport shooter. He represented USA at the 2020 Summer Olympics in Tokyo and 2024 Summer Olympics in Paris.
