= Compak Sporting =

Form of clay pigeon shooting

Compak Sporting is a form of clay pigeon shooting, similar to sporting clays but taking place in a smaller area. The name Compak Sporting is a protected, registered trademark with a code of sports rules, owned by FITASC (Fédération Internationale de Tir aux Armes Sportives De Chasse).

== Description ==
Compak Sporting is a "compacted" form of sporting clays, which is a shotgun sport usually spread over 12 to 36 stations (shooting areas) occupying around 200 acres (0.81 km^{2}), presenting 2 or 3 different clay targets at each. One shooter will shoot the targets, followed by the next and so on. With Compak Sporting the space requirement is considerably less, and a squad of up to 6 shotgun shooters, (5 actively shooting), will stand in a straight line, each on a marked square (1 meter by 1 meter) and spaced 3 to 5 meters apart (i.e. the shooting line will be 12 to 20 meters long). In front of them will be the "target area". This is a rectangle 40 meters wide by 25 meters deep and positioned 4 to 5 meters in front of the line of shooters. (If the shooters are numbered 1 to 5, the rectangle will be centered on shooter 3)

The target area, a 40 x 25 meter rectangle, should be marked with four flags defining the four corners. Clay targets are thrown by clay pigeon trap machines, of which there must be a minimum of 6. Targets may be thrown from either inside or outside the area, and may land inside or outside it, but every target thrown must pass over at least one side of the target area. Shooters take turns shooting the various targets – these can be single targets or double targets (instant pair or report pair). Targets are released on a random time delay (0 – 3 seconds) after the shooter's call. There are numerous rules defining compulsory targets, traps, triggering systems, shooting stands, targets, trajectory-setting-tables, guns, ammunition etc.

== Variations ==
Although Compak Sporting is an international shooting game with defined rules, many other variations of Compact Sporting games have been devised. For a limited shooting area, Compact Sporting can provide a selection of various targets all shot from one "station". Sometimes called "Lazy man's Sporting Clays", a Compact Sporting layout can give a wide variety of target presentations without having to walk around a sporting clays course. Another feature of Compact Sporting is that the game can be played from under cover in poor weather conditions. Compak Sporting requires a minimum of 6 clay pigeon trap machines, but it is not unusual for Compact Sporting games to use up to 15 trap machines. With the correct design, a covered Compact Sporting deck or platform can be used to host Compak Sporting regulated shooting competitions.
