= Barbora Šumová =

Czech sport shooter (born 1995)

Personal information
- Nationality: Czech
- Born: 17 February 1995 (age 31) Kolín, Czech Republic

Sport
- Sport: Shooting
Medal record
Women's shooting
Representing Czech Republic
European Games
Bronze medal – third place	2019 Minsk	Mixed team skeet
Bronze medal – third place	2023 Kraków-Małopolska	Team skeet
European Championships
Silver medal – second place	2021 Osijek	Mixed team skeet
Silver medal – second place	2025 Chateauroux	Skeet Team
Bronze medal – third place	2024 Lonato	Mixed team skeet
Bronze medal – third place	2026 Athens	Skeet team

Barbora Šumová (born 17 February 1995) is a Czech sport shooter.

She won a silver medal in Skeet Mixed Team at the 2021 European Shooting Championships, jointly with Jakub Tomeček. She qualified to represent the Czech Republic at the 2020 Summer Olympics in Tokyo 2021, competing in women's skeet.
