= Ben Llewellin =

Welsh sports shooter (born 1994)

Personal information
- Nationality: British / Welsh
- Born: 11 July 1994 (age 31)

Sport
- Sport: Shooting
Medal record
Men's shooting
Representing Great Britain
World Championships
| Gold medal – first place | 2022 Osijek | Mixed team skeet |
| Bronze medal – third place | 2023 Baku | Mixed team skeet |
European Games
| Bronze medal – third place | 2023 Kraków-Małopolska | Mixed team skeet |
European Championships
| Gold medal – first place | 2022 Larnaca | Mixed team skeet |
| Gold medal – first place | 2023 Osijek | Mixed team skeet |
| Gold medal – first place | 2024 Lonato | Men's team skeet |
| Gold medal – first place | 2025 Chateauroux | Skeet |
| Bronze medal – third place | 2019 Lonato del Garda | Mixed team skeet |
| Bronze medal – third place | 2022 Larnaca | Skeet |
| Bronze medal – third place | 2019 Lonato del Garda | Men's team skeet |
| Bronze medal – third place | 2025 Chateauroux | Skeet team |
Representing Wales
Commonwealth Games
| Silver medal – second place | 2018 Gold Coast | Skeet |
Commonwealth Championships
| Gold medal – first place | 2017 Brisbane | Skeet |

Ben William David Llewellin (born 11 July 1994) is a Welsh sports shooter, who won a silver medal for Wales in the Men's skeet at the 2018 Commonwealth Games. In July 2025 he became European Champion in the Men's Skeet event.

He was born in Haverfordwest, the son of rally driver David Llewellin. In 2016 he won a silver medal at the International Shooting Sport Federation World Cup Finals in Cyprus, followed in 2017 by another at New Delhi, where he and Riccardo Filippelli of Italy both fired a world record score. Later in the year he won a gold medal in the Skeet event at the Oceania and Commonwealth Shooting Federations' Championships in Australia.

He won silver at the 2018 Commonwealth Games, finishing second to former world champion Georgios Achilleos of Cyprus, with a score of 56 out of 60 targets.

In September 2023 with Amber Rutter, he won the Mixed team skeet event at the European Shotgun Championships in Osijek.

In July 2025 he became European Champion in the Men's Skeet event, and won a bronze medal with the men's skeet team.
