= Hujiang University =

Former private Baptist university in Shanghai, China

- 滬江大學
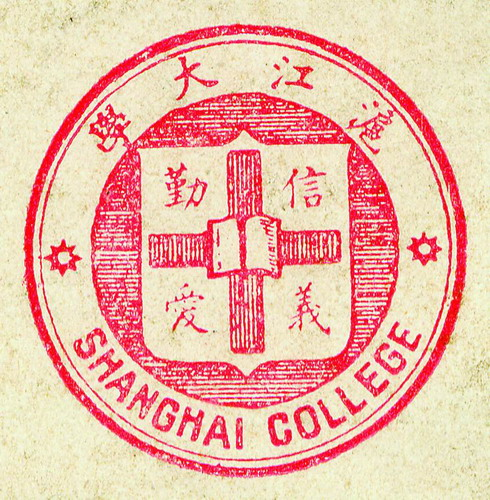
- Other names: Shanghai College; University of Shanghai
- Motto: 信义勤爱
- Type: Private university
- Active: 1906–1952
- Affiliations: Baptist
- President: Liu Zhan'en
- Location: Shanghai, China

Hujiang University (simplified Chinese: 沪江大学; traditional Chinese: 滬江大學; pinyin: Hùjiāng Dàxué; lit. 'University at Hu River') was a private Baptist university from 1906 to 1952 in Shanghai, China. It was established by the American Baptist Missionary Union and the Southern Baptist Convention. The institution was also known as Shanghai College or University of Shanghai.

== History ==
During the Boxer Rebellion in 1900, the Central China Mission of the American Southern Baptist Convention and the East China Mission of the American Baptist Missionary Union (Northern Baptists) gathered in Shanghai. The two missions collaborated for higher education, establishing the Shanghai Baptist Theological Seminary in 1906 and Shanghai Baptist College in 1909. The two were combined in 1911 to form "Shanghai Baptist College and Theological Seminary" (上海浸會大學). The name "University of Shanghai" (simplified Chinese: 沪江大学; traditional Chinese: 滬江大學) was adopted when it was registered with the Chinese government in 1929.

Liu Zhan'en (or Herman Chan-En Liu), an alumnus of Teachers College, Columbia University, was the first Chinese president to succeed Dr. F. J. White as university president.

Hujiang University was in a critical position for information sharing after the 1937 Battle of Nanking. President Liu was assassinated by the Japanese military at a bus stop in Shanghai on April 7, 1938, after he secretly disseminated Nanjing Massacre photos (taken by Western missionaries) to people around the world.

Ling, Hsien-yang (prefers Henry H. Lin), an alumnus of Hujiang University (1927) and University of Southern California (1929), was the last Chinese president of the university. He elected to remain in mainland China to take care of the university and its students following the communist takeover of China in 1949. He was imprisoned in 1951 as part of the Campaign to Suppress Counterrevolutionaries and died few years later.

== In 1952 ==
Hujiang University was merged into East China Normal University and other universities in Shanghai. It is no longer existing. Some university records are available for research purposes in Yale University Divinity School's Library.

== Building ==
In 1919, the campus was designed by the American architect Henry Murphy's company.
