= Guy de Valle Flor =

Portuguese sports shooter (born 1920)

Personal information
- Full name: Guy Chaves de Valle Flor
- Born: 19 May 1920 Pau, Pyrénées-Atlantiques, France

Sport
- Sport: Sports shooting

Guy de Valle Flor (born 19 May 1920, date of death unknown) was a Portuguese sports shooter. He competed at the 1960 Summer Olympics and the 1964 Summer Olympics. Flor is deceased.
