= Selin Ali =

Bulgarian sports shooter (born 2002)

Personal information
- Native name: Селин Али
- Nationality: Bulgarian
- Born: 14 February 2002 (age 23) Aytos, Bulgaria

Sport
- Sport: Sports shooting
- Coached by: Niyazi Mehmed

Selin Niyazi Ali (Bulgarian: Селин Али; born 14 February 2002) is a Bulgarian sports shooter. She competed in the women's trap event at the 2020 Summer Olympics.

== Career ==
She competed at the 2019 Junior World Championships, winning a gold medal, and at the 2019 ISSF Junior World Cup, winning a silver medal. She competed in mixed events, with Ivan Georgiev.
