= Aryavansh Tyagi =

Indian sport shooter

Personal information
- Nationality: Indian
- Born: 14 March 2004 (age 22) Meerut, Uttar Pradesh, India

Sport
- Country: India
- Sport: Sport shooter
- Event: Trap Shooting
- Coached by: Mansher Singh)
Medal record
Men's shooting
Representing India
Asian Championship
Gold medal – first place	2023 Korea	Team Trap
Junior World Cup
Silver medal – second place	2022 Suhl	Team Trap
World Championships
Gold medal – first place	2022 Osijek	Team Trap
World Championships
Silver medal – second place	2023 Korea	Team Trap

Aryavansh Tyagi (born 14 March 2004) is an Indian Sports Shooter. He won the Team Gold Medal at the ISSF Shotgun World Championship 2022 in Osijek, Croatia. He won a Gold Medal at the championship in 2022 and a team Silver medal at the World Cup in Suhl, Germany 2022.

== Early life and education ==
He was born on 14 March 2004 in Meerut, in the Indian state of Uttar Pradesh.

== Career ==
He won the Gold medal with his team (Croatia) at ISSF World Championship 2022 in Croatia World Championship. He won the Silver Medal With his Team (Suhl Germany) in the World Cup.
