= Károly Gombos (sport shooter) =

Hungarian sports shooter

Personal information
- Nationality: Hungarian
- Born: 31 July 1954 (age 70); Budapest, Hungary

Sport
- Sport: Sports shooting

Károly Gombos (born 31 July 1954) is a Hungarian sports shooter. He competed in two events at the 1996 Summer Olympics.
