= Aaron Heading =

British sport shooter

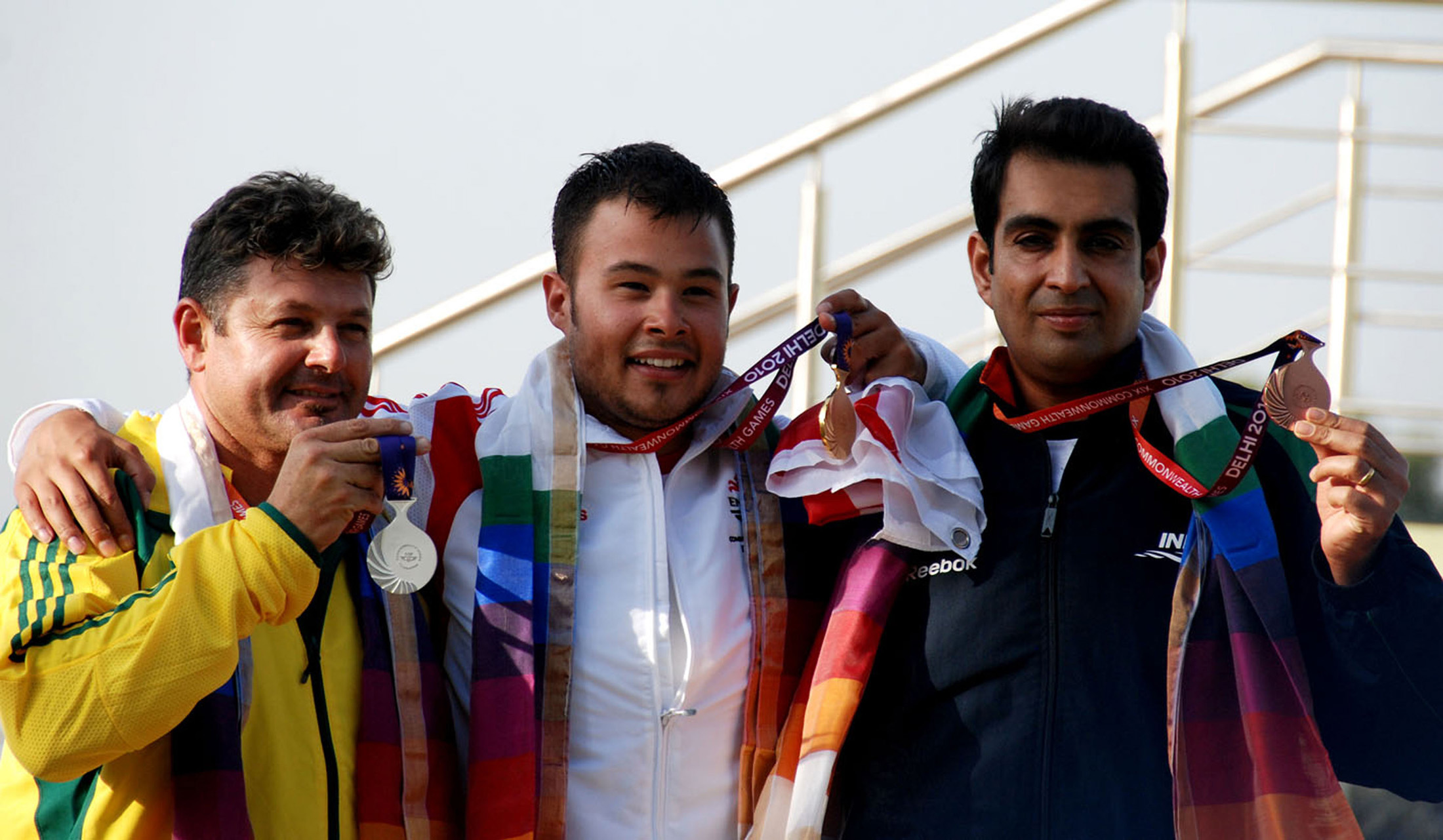
- XIX Commonwealth Games-2010 Delhi: (Men’s Shooting Single Trap) Heading Aaron of England (Gold), Miachel Diamond of Australia (Silver) and Manavjit Singh Sandhu of India (Bronze), during the medal presentation ceremony, at Dr Karni Singh Shooting Range, in New Delhi on October 10, 2010.

Personal information
- Nationality: British
- Born: 21 May 1987 (age 39) King's Lynn, England
- Height: 5 ft 7 in (170 cm)
- Weight: 90 kg (198 lb)

Sport
- Country: Great Britain / England
- Sport: Shooting
- Event: Trap shooting
- Club: East Yorkshire Gun Club
Medal record
Men's shooting
Representing Great Britain
World Championships
| Gold medal – first place | 2022 Osijek | Trap team |
| Bronze medal – third place | 2011 Belgrade | Trap team |
| Bronze medal – third place | 2018 Changwon | Mixed team trap |
| Bronze medal – third place | 2019 Lonato del Garda | Trap team |
European Games
| Bronze medal – third place | 2019 Minsk | Trap |
European Championships
| Gold medal – first place | 2023 Osijek | Trap team |
| Silver medal – second place | 2019 Lonato del Garda | Trap |
| Silver medal – second place | 2024 Lonato | Trap team |
| Bronze medal – third place | 2022 Larnaca | Trap team |
| Bronze medal – third place | 2026 Athens | Trap |
Representing England
Commonwealth Games
| Gold medal – first place | 2010 Delhi | Trap |
| Silver medal – second place | 2014 Glasgow | Trap |
| Silver medal – second place | 2018 Gold Coast | Trap |
| Bronze medal – third place | 2010 Delhi | Trap pairs |
Commonwealth Championships
| Gold medal – first place | 2017 Brisbane | Trap |
| Silver medal – second place | 2010 Delhi | Trap |
| Silver medal – second place | 2010 Delhi | Trap badge |
| Bronze medal – third place | 2010 Delhi | Trap pairs |

Aaron Heading (born 21 May 1987) is a clay-pigeon shooter, specialising in the Trap discipline. He represents England and Great Britain.

In 2010 Heading earned selection for the England shooting team for the 2010 Commonwealth Games in Delhi from 3–14 October 2010. He won Bronze when competing in the men's trap pairs, with partner David Kirk, and Gold in the singles event.

In 2014 he was selected for the Commonwealth Games in Glasgow, where he won the Silver meal in Men's Trap.

He qualified to represent Great Britain at the 2020 Summer Olympics. He finished 23rd.

At the 2022 World Championships he won in the Trap Team event with Matthew Coward-Holley and Nathan Hales.
