= Giovanna Pasello =

Italian sports shooter

Personal information
- Nationality: Italian
- Born: 29 September 1959 (age 65)

Sport
- Sport: Sports shooting

Giovanna Pasello (born 29 September 1959) is an Italian sports shooter. She competed in the women's double trap event at the 1996 Summer Olympics.
