= Maurice Tabet =

Lebanese sports shooter (1919–2014)

Personal information
- Born: 1 February 1919 Alexandria, Egypt
- Died: 27 January 2014 (aged 94)

Sport
- Sport: Sports shooting

Maurice Tabet (1 February 1919 – 27 January 2014) was a Lebanese sports shooter. He competed at the 1960 Summer Olympics and the 1972 Summer Olympics.
