= João Azevedo (sport shooter) =

Portuguese sport shooter (born 1984)

Personal information
- Full name: João Paulo Matias de Azevedo
- Nationality: Portuguese
- Born: 13 March 1984 (age 42) Vila do Conde, Portugal
- Height: 1.84 m (6 ft 0 in)
- Weight: 145 kg (320 lb)

Sport
- Country: Portugal
- Sport: Shooting
- Event: Trap
- Start activity: 1998
- Coached by: Antonio Azuedo
Medal record
Individual
Event	1st	2nd	3rd
World Championships	0	1	0
European Championships	0	1	2
World Cup	1	2	2
Total	1	4	4
Men's shooting
Representing Portugal
World Championships
Gold medal – first place	2023 Baku	Trap mixed team
European Games
Bronze medal – third place	2023 Kraków-Małopolska	Team trap

João Paulo Matias de Azevedo (born 13 March 1984) is a Portuguese sport shooter who has won medals at individual senior level at the World Championships and European Championships.
