= Rickard Levin-Andersson =

Swedish sport shooter (born 1991)

Personal information
- Born: 24 April 1991 (age 35) Ale, Sweden
- Occupation: Tinsmith
- Height: 179 cm (5 ft 10 in)
- Weight: 65 kg (143 lb)

Sport
- Country: Sweden
- Sport: Sport shooting
- Event: Trap
- Club: Skepplanda SpS
Medal record
Men's shooting
Representing Sweden
European Games
Bronze medal – third place	2023 Kraków-Małopolska	Trap

Rickard Levin-Andersson (born 24 April 1991) is a Swedish sport shooter. He qualified for the 2024 Summer Olympics in the men's trap event.

== Biography ==
Levin-Andersson was born on 24 April 1991 in Alvhem, Ale Municipality, Sweden, and grew up in Skepplanda. He began sport shooting at the age of 11, after being introduced to the sport by a friend. He began playing the sport competitively in 2006 and later joined the club Skepplanda SpS.
