= Mauro De Filippis =

Italian sport shooter (born 1980)

Personal information
- Nationality: Italian
- Born: 10 August 1980 (age 46) Taranto, Italy
- Height: 1.92 m (6 ft 4 in)
- Weight: 90 kg (198 lb)

Sport
- Country: Italy
- Sport: Shooting
- Event: Trap
- Club: G.S. Fiamme Oro Italy Police
Medal record
Men's shooting
Representing Italy
World Championships
Gold medal – first place	2019 Lonato del Garda	Team trap
Gold medal – first place	2022 Osijek	Mixed team trap
Silver medal – second place	2019 Lonato del Garda	Trap
Bronze medal – third place	2018 Changwon	Team trap
Bronze medal – third place	2022 Osijek	Team trap
European Games
Gold medal – first place	2023 Kraków-Małopolska	Trap
Bronze medal – third place	2023 Kraków-Małopolska	Mixed team trap
European Championships
Gold medal – first place	2014 Sarlóspuszta	Team trap
Gold medal – first place	2018 Leobersdorf	Team trap
Gold medal – first place	2019 Lonato del Garda	Team trap
Gold medal – first place	2022 Larnaca	Team trap
Gold medal – first place	2024 Lonato	Mixed team trap
Gold medal – first place	2025 Chateauroux	Trap Team
Silver medal – second place	2021 Osijek	Team trap
Silver medal – second place	2023 Osijek	Trap
Silver medal – second place	2026 Athens	Team trap
Bronze medal – third place	2019 Lonato del Garda	Trap
Bronze medal – third place	2021 Osijek	Trap
Bronze medal – third place	2023 Osijek	Team trap
Bronze medal – third place	2025 Chateauroux	Trap
Mediterranean Games
Bronze medal – third place	2026 Taranto	Mixed team trap

Mauro De Filippis (born 10 August 1980) is an Italian sport shooter.

He participated at the 2018 ISSF World Shooting Championships.
