= European Shotgun Championships =

The European Running Target Championships are special shooting sport championships organized discontinuously by the International Shooting Sport Federation (ISSF).

== Editions ==
- 1956 European Shotgun Championships
- 1957 European Shotgun Championships
- 1958 European Shotgun Championships
- 1988 European Shotgun Championships
- 1990 European Shotgun Championships
- 1992 European Shotgun Championships
- 1994 European Shotgun Championships
- 1996 European Shotgun Championships
- 1998 European Shotgun Championships
- 2000 European Shotgun Championships
- 2002 European Shotgun Championships
- 2004 European Shotgun Championships
- 2012 European Shotgun Championships
- 2013 European Shotgun Championships
- 2014 European Shotgun Championships
- 2016 European Shotgun Championships
- 2018 European Shotgun Championships
- 2019 European Shotgun Championships
- 2022 European Shotgun Championships
- 2023 European Shotgun Championships
- 2024 European Shotgun Championships
- 2026 European Shotgun Championships
