= Oğuzhan Tüzün =

Turkish sports shooter (born 1982)

Personal information
- Nationality: Turkish
- Born: 20 October 1982 (age 43) Istanbul, Turkey
- Education: Physical education and sports
- Occupation: Teacher
- Years active: 1996–present
- Height: 1.87 m (6 ft 2 in)
- Weight: 121 kg (267 lb)

Sport
- Country: Turkey
- Sport: Shotgun shooting
- Events: Trap, double trap
- Club: Istanbul Hunting and Shooting S.C.
- Coached by: Diego Gasperini
Medal record
Shooting
Representing Turkey
World Championships
Gold medal – first place	2010 İzmir	Trap
Gold medal – first place	2011 Concepción	Trap
Silver medal – second place	2002 Lahti	Junior trap
Bronze medal – third place	2009 Maribor	Trap
European Championships
Gold medal – first place	2024 Lonato	Team trap
Silver medal – second place	2015 Maribor	Team trap
Silver medal – second place	2022 Larnaca	Trap mixed team
Bronze medal – third place	2018 Leobersdorf	Trap mixed team
Mediterranean Games
Gold medal – first place	2022 Oran	Trap
Islamic Solidarity Games
Gold medal – first place	2021 Konya	Trap mixed team
Silver medal – second place	2017 Baku	Trap
Silver medal – second place	2017 Baku	Trap mixed team

Oğuzhan Tüzün (born 20 October 1982) is a Turkish sport shooter competing in the trap event. The 1.87 m (6 ft 2 in) tall athlete at 121 kg (267 lb) is a member of İstanbul Hunting and Shooting Sports Club and is coached by Diego Gasperini.

== Biography ==
Tüzün started sport shooting with his father's encouragement in 1996 at the age of 15. His father Özer Tüzün, a dentist, is a passionate hunter and shooter, who personally coaches his son. Oğuzhan Tüzün works as a teacher following his graduation from the Sports Academy in physical education and sports.

He became already Turkish champion in the cadets category in 1997. At the age of 18, he participated at the 2000 Summer Olympics in Sydney, Australia placing 30th.

He won the silver medal in the junior category at the 2002 ISSF World Shooting Championships in Lahti, Finland. Tüzün represented Turkey at the 2004 Summer Olympics without advancing to the final. He placed 4th at the 2005 Mediterranean Games in Almería, Spain. In 2009, he won the bronze medal at the World Shotgun Championships held in Maribor, Slovenia.

Tüzün became gold medalist at the 2010 ISSF World Cup Final held in İzmir, Turkey and repeated his success at the 2011 ISSF World Cup in Concepción, Chile. This result brought him the qualification to the 2012 Summer Olympics, where he finished in 24th.

== Achievements ==
Year	Competition	Venue	Position	Event	Notes
Representing Turkey
2002	ISSF World Championships	Lahti, Finland	2nd	Junior Trap	
2005	Mediterranean Games	Almería, Spain	4th	Trap	
2009	World Shotgun Championships	Maribor, Slovenia	3rd	Trap	
2010	ISSF World Championships	İzmir, Turkey	1st	Trap	
2011	ISSF World Championships	Concepción, Chile	1st	Trap	
