= Matthew Coward-Holley =

British sport shooter (born 1994)

Matt Coward-Holley
Personal information
- Full name: Matthew John Coward-Holley
- Nationality: British
- Born: 14 December 1994 (age 31) Chelmsford, England
- Height: 188 cm (6 ft 2 in)

Sport
- Country: United Kingdom
- Sport: Shooting
- Event: Trap
Medal record
Men's shooting
Representing Great Britain
Olympic Games
Bronze medal – third place	2020 Tokyo	Trap
World Championships
Gold medal – first place	2015 Lonato del Garda	Team double trap
Gold medal – first place	2019 Lonato del Garda	Trap
Gold medal – first place	2022 Osijek	Team trap
Bronze medal – third place	2019 Lonato del Garda	Team trap
European Games
Silver medal – second place	2023 Kraków-Małopolska	Mixed team trap
European Championships
Gold medal – first place	2015 Maribor	Team double trap
Gold medal – first place	2016 Lonato del Garda	Team double trap
Gold medal – first place	2021 Osijek	Trap
Silver medal – second place	2021 Osijek	Mixed team trap
Silver medal – second place	2025 Chateauroux	Trap
Bronze medal – third place	2016 Lonato del Garda	Double trap
Bronze medal – third place	2022 Larnaca	Team trap

Matthew John Coward-Holley (born 14 December 1994) is a British sport shooter.

Coward-Holley was a promising rugby player as a teenager but two serious back injuries involving broken vertebrae ended his playing. In order to remain active, he turned to shooting, a sport he had done with his father between the ages of 8 and 12 before taking up rugby.

He participated at the 2019 World Shotgun Championships, where he became the first Briton to win a world title in an individual Olympic shotgun discipline. He went on to win two medals at the 2021 European Shooting Championships, including trap gold.

He qualified to represent Great Britain at the 2020 Summer Olympics, securing bronze in the men's trap.

At the European Championships in Châteauroux he took silver in men’s trap.
