= Shotgun (shooting sports) =

Shotgun disciplines
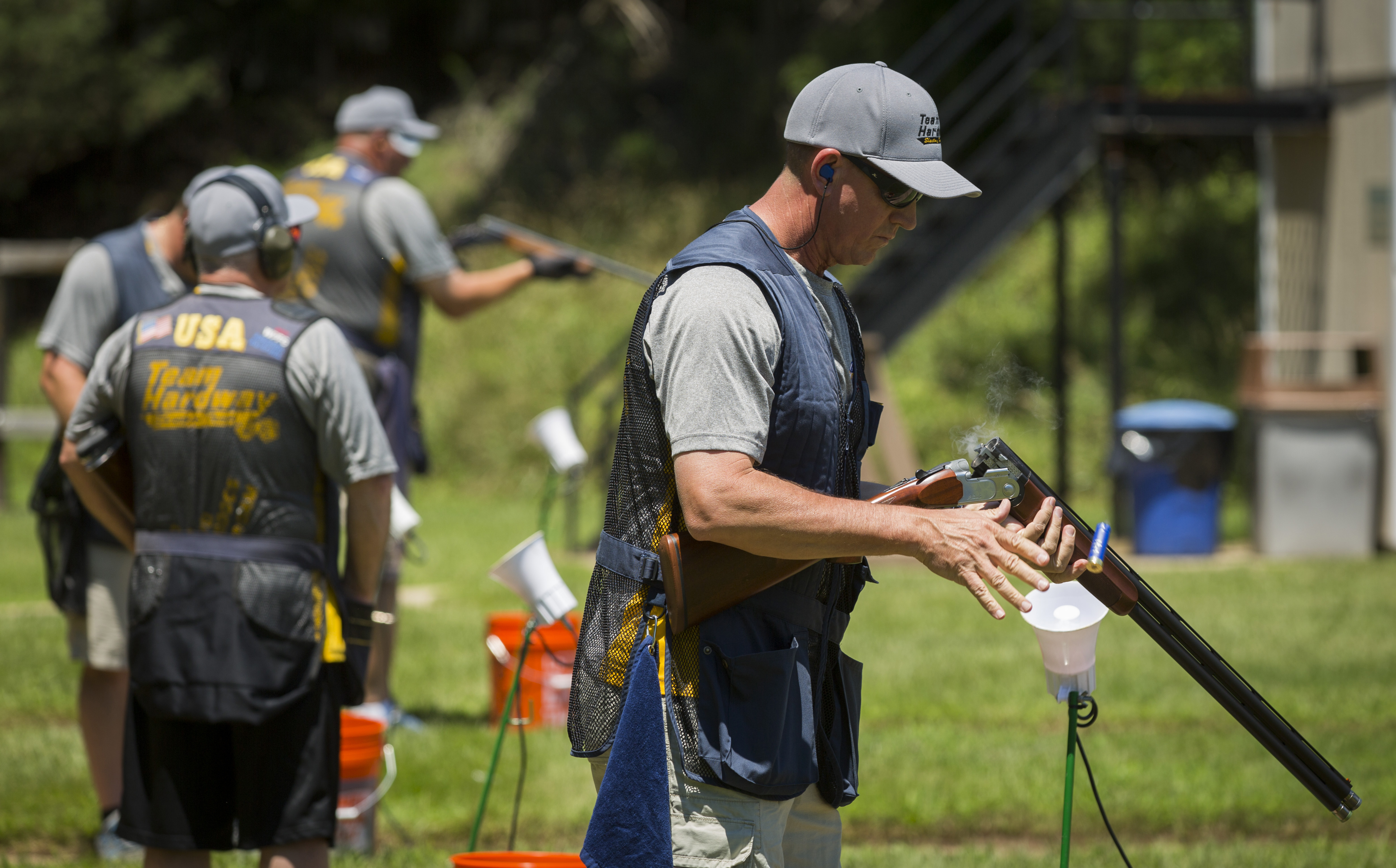
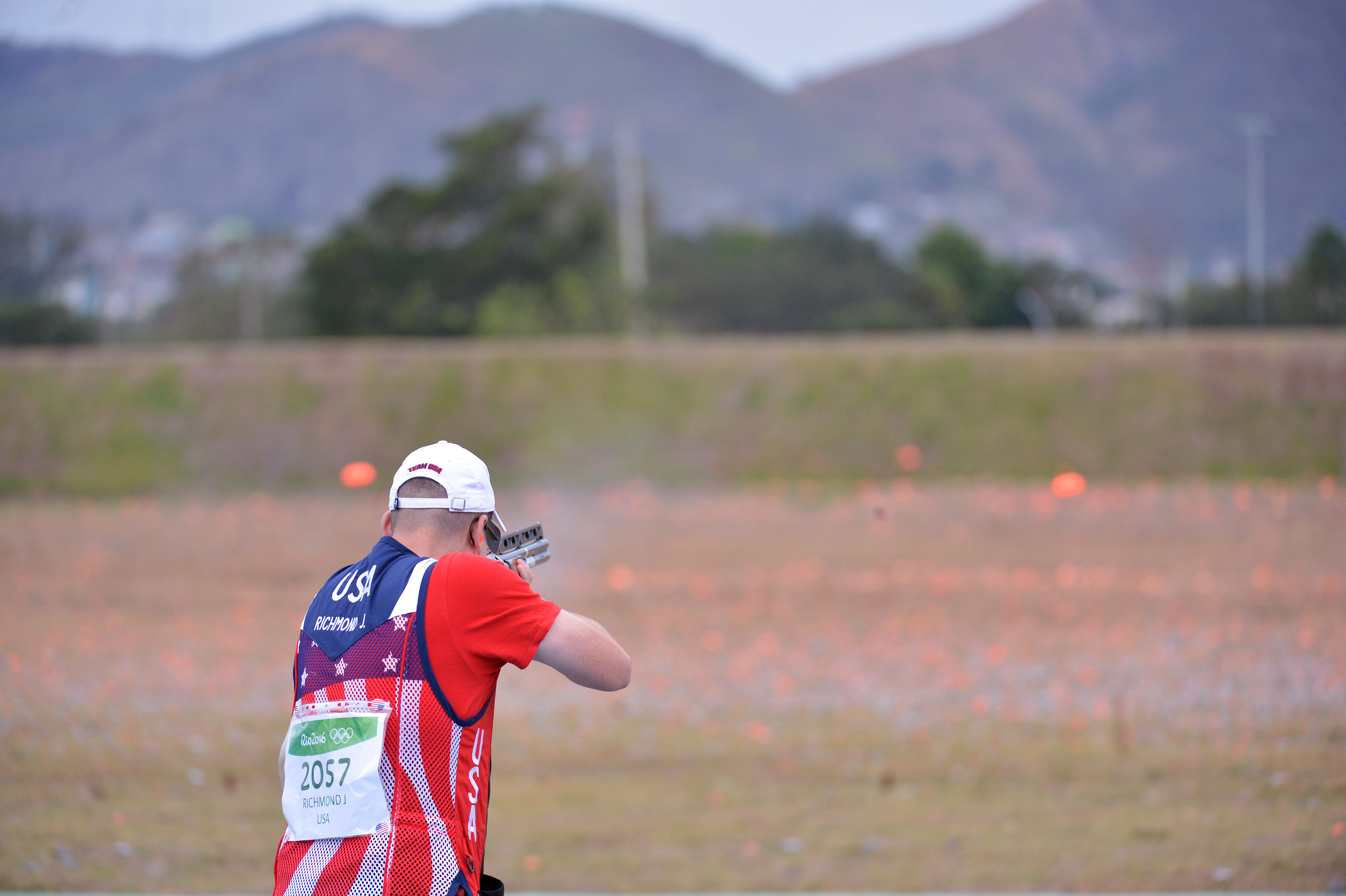
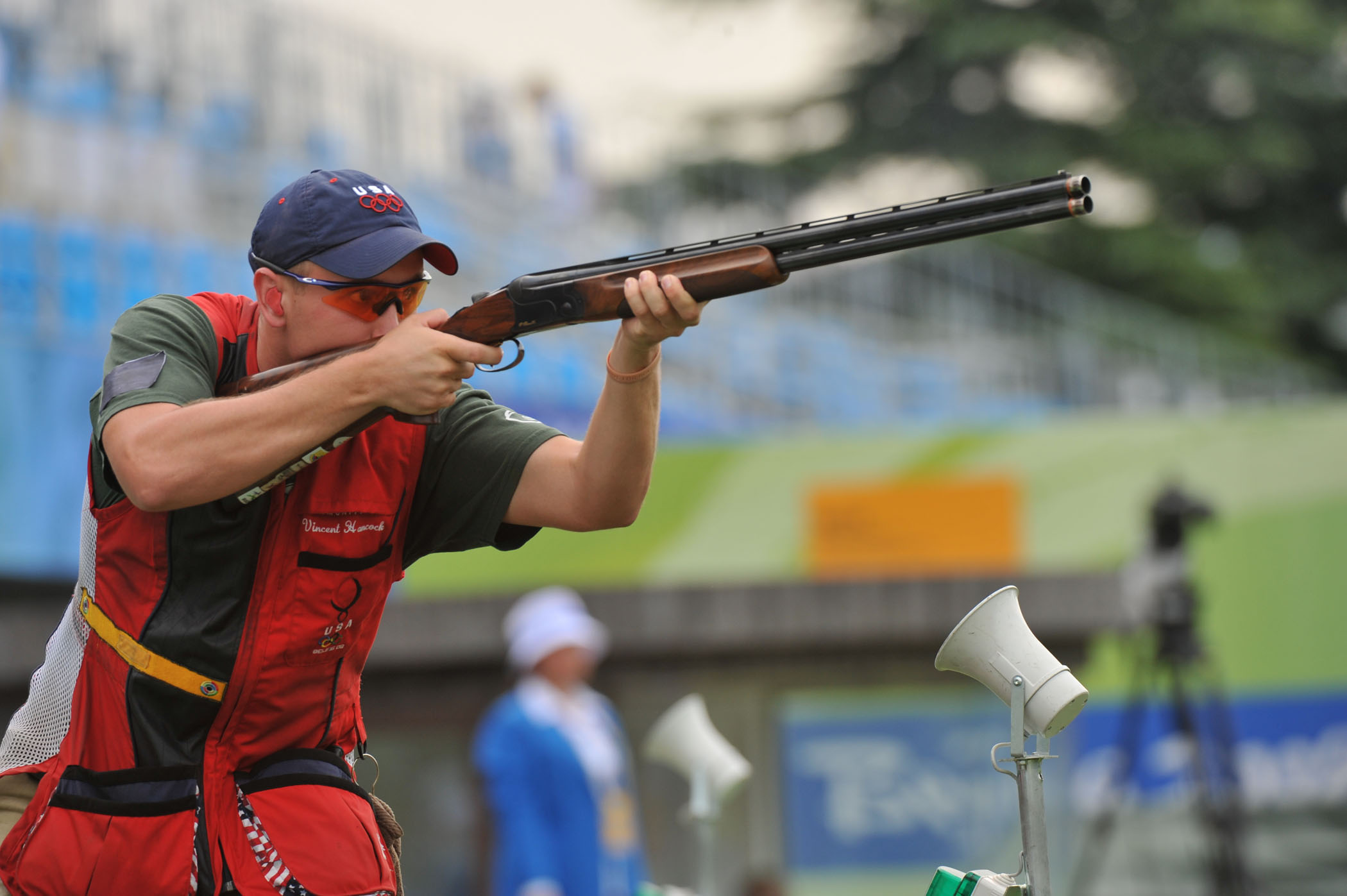
Shooters during a pause of a trap competition (top), Josh Richmond during a double trap event at Rio 2016 (middle), Vincent Hancock during the skeet final at Beijing 2008 (footer).

The shotgun is the name of the sport discipline assigned in the international shooting sports competitions, organized by the International Shooting Sport Federation (ISSF), which includes the three clay shooting disciplines of trap, double trap and skeet.

== Clay target shooting ==
Clay pigeon shooting are shotgun disciplines shot at flying clay pigeon targets.

- The three Shotgun ISSF/ Olympic shooting events are all are based on quick reaction to clay targets thrown by a machines called "Traps".
  - Skeet: Targets are either thrown in singles or doubles from two throwers called "traps" placed 40 meters apart.
  - Trap and Double Trap: Either one (trap) or two targets (double trap) are thrown from 16 meters in front of the shooter.
- The Fédération Internationale de Tir aux Armes Sportives de Chasse (FITASC) Compak Sporting is a type of shotgun sport shooting similar to sporting clays, trap and skeet.
- Other shotgun sports with (at least partial) international recognition include Sporting Clays, Down-The-Line/ATA and Five stand.

== Main competitions ==
- World Shotgun Championships
- European Shotgun Championships

== See also ==
- Shotgun
- ISSF Olympic trap
- ISSF Olympic skeet
- ISSF shooting events
- Trap shooting
- Double trap
- Skeet shooting
- International Shooting Sport Federation
