= Shooting at the 2019 European Games – Mixed team trap =

Mixed team trap at the 2019 European Games
- Venue: Sporting Club
- Dates: 24 June
- Competitors: 46 from 16 nations

Medalists
gold medal	Antonio Bailón; Fátima Gálvez	Spain
silver medal	Giovanni Pellielo; Jessica Rossi	Italy
bronze medal	Aleksey Alipov; Daria Semianova	Russia

The mixed team trap event at the 2019 European Games in Minsk, Belarus took place on 24 June at the Sporting Club.

== Schedule ==
All times are FET (UTC+03:00)

Date	Time	Event
Monday, 24 June 2019	10:00	Qualification
Monday, 24 June 2019	15:45	Final

== Records ==
Prior to this competition, the existing world, European and Games records were as follows.

Qualification
World Record	Australia; Turkey; United States	149	Acapulco, Mexico	20 March 2019
European Record	Turkey	149	Acapulco, Mexico	20 March 2019
Games Record	—	—	—	—
Final
World Record	Italy	47	Leobersdorf, Austria	5 August 2018
European Record	Italy	47	Leobersdorf, Austria	5 August 2018
Games Record	—	—	—	—

== Results ==
=== Qualification ===
The qualification round took place on 24 June to determine the qualifiers for the finals.

Rank	Nation	Athletes	Score	Notes
1	Spain	Antonio Bailón	143	GR, QG
1	Spain	Fátima Gálvez	143	GR, QG
2	Italy	Giovanni Pelleilo	138	QG
2	Italy	Jessica Rossi	138	QG
3	Russia	Aleksey Alipov	137	QB
3	Russia	Daria Semianova	137	QB
4	Italy	Valerio Grazini	135	QB
4	Italy	Silvana Stanco	135	QB
5	Turkey	Yavuz İlnam	134	
5	Turkey	Safiye Sarıtürk	134	
6	Ireland	Derek Burnett	133	
6	Ireland	Aoife Gormally	133	
7	Great Britain	Aaron Heading	130	
7	Great Britain	Abbey Ling	130	
8	Czech Republic	Jiří Lipták	129	
8	Czech Republic	Zina Hrdličková	129	
9	Spain	Alberto Fernández	129	
9	Spain	Beatriz Martínez	129	
10	Portugal	João Azevedo	128	
10	Portugal	Ana Rita Rodrigues	128	
11	Czech Republic	David Kostelecký	128	
11	Czech Republic	Kateřina Janečková	128	
11	Poland	Piotr Kowalczyk	128	
11	Poland	Sandra Bernal	128	
13	Slovakia	Marián Kovačócy	127	
13	Slovakia	Jana Špotáková	127	
14	France	Antonin Desert	127	
14	France	Mélanie Couzy	127	
15	Slovenia	Boštjan Maček	127	
15	Slovenia	Jasmina Maček	127	
16	France	Sébastien Guerrero	125	
16	France	Carole Cormenier	125	
17	Slovakia	Erik Varga	124	
17	Slovakia	Zuzana Rehák-Štefečeková	124	
18	Finland	Vesa Törnroos	123	
18	Finland	Satu Mäkelä-Nummela	123	
19	Cyprus	Andreas Makri	123	
19	Cyprus	Georgia Konstantinidou	123	
20	Great Britain	Matthew Coward-Holley	123	
20	Great Britain	Kirsty Barr	123	
21	Germany	Andreas Löw	120	
21	Germany	Sonja Scheibl	120	
22	San Marino	Gian Marco Berti	115	
22	San Marino	Alessandra Perilli	115	
23	Germany	Paul Pigorsch	115	
23	Germany	Katrin Quooss	115	

=== Finals ===
The finals round took place on 24 June to determine the final classification.

Rank	Nation	Athletes	Score	S-off
Gold medal match
1st place, gold medalist(s)	Spain	Antonio Bailón; Fátima Gálvez	44	
2nd place, silver medalist(s)	Italy	Giovanni Pellielo; Jessica Rossi	40	
Bronze medal match
3rd place, bronze medalist(s)	Russia	Aleksey Alipov; Daria Semianova	45	
4	Italy	Valerio Grazini; Silvana Stanco	43	
