= Shooting at the 2023 European Games – Mixed team skeet =

Mixed team skeet at the 2023 European Games
- Venue: Wrocław Shooting Centre
- Dates: 26 June
- Competitors: 34 from 12 nations
- Teams: 17

Medalists
gold medal	Simona Scocchetti; Gabriele Rossetti	Italy
silver medal	Anastasia Eleftheriou; Andreas Chasikos	Cyprus
bronze medal	Amber Rutter; Ben Llewellin	Great Britain

The mixed team skeet event at the 2023 European Games took place on 26 June at the Wrocław Shooting Centre in Wrocław Poland.

== Records ==
Prior to this competition, the existing world, European and Games records were as follows.

Qualification
World Record	United States; Kim Rhode; Christian Elliott	148	Lonato, Italy	7 July 2019
European Record	France; Lucie Anastassiou; Éric Delaunay	148	Doha, Qatar	8 March 2023
Games Record	Italy; Chiara Cainero; Gabriele Rossetti	146	Minsk, Belarus	28 June 2019

== Results ==
=== Qualification ===
Rank	Country	Athlete	Round			Total	Team total	Notes
Rank	Country	Athlete	1	2	3	Total	Team total	Notes
1	Cyprus 2	Anastasia Eleftheriou	23	25	25	73	148	QG, =WR, GR
1	Cyprus 2	Andreas Chasikos	25	25	25	75	148	QG, =WR, GR
2	Italy 1	Simona Scocchetti	25	24	24	73	147+23	QG
2	Italy 1	Gabriele Rossetti	25	24	25	74	147+23	QG
3	Great Britain 1	Amber Rutter	25	25	25	75	147+22	QB
3	Great Britain 1	Ben Llewellin	22	25	25	72	147+22	QB
4	Ukraine	Iryna Malovichko	23	25	25	73	147+2	QB
4	Ukraine	Mykola Milchev	25	25	24	74	147+2	QB
5	Finland	Marjut Heinonen	23	24	25	72	146	
5	Finland	Eetu Kallioinen	25	24	25	74	146	
6	France	Lucie Anastassiou	24	24	23	71	146	
6	France	Éric Delaunay	25	25	25	75	146	
7	Italy 2	Martina Bartolomei	23	25	24	72	145	
7	Italy 2	Elia Sdruccioli	24	25	24	73	145	
8	Cyprus 1	Konstantia Nikolaou	25	24	23	72	145	
8	Cyprus 1	Georgios Achilleos	23	25	25	73	145	
9	Germany 1	Nadine Messerschmidt	23	24	25	72	144	
9	Germany 1	Sven Korte	25	23	24	72	144	
10	Greece	Emmanouela Katzouraki	24	24	24	72	144	
10	Greece	Nikolaos Mavrommatis	25	23	24	72	144	
11	Poland	Natalia Szamrej	22	22	24	68	142	
11	Poland	Kacper Baksalary	25	25	24	74	142	
12	Czech Republic 1	Barbora Šumová	24	22	24	70	142	
12	Czech Republic 1	Jakub Tomeček	24	24	24	72	142	
13	Germany 2	Nele Wissmer	24	23	22	69	142	
13	Germany 2	Vincent Haaga	24	24	25	73	142	
14	Great Britain 2	Emily Hibbs	22	24	23	69	141	
14	Great Britain 2	Karl Killander	24	23	25	72	141	
15	Czech Republic 2	Martina Skalická	20	24	24	68	141	
15	Czech Republic 2	Tomáš Nýdrle	25	25	23	73	141	
16	Latvia	Anda Lita Vāvere	24	19	22	65	138	
16	Latvia	Dainis Upelnieks	25	24	24	73	138	
17	Netherlands	Esmee van der Veen	21	22	22	65	137	
17	Netherlands	Tobias Haccou	25	24	23	72	137	
	Sweden	Victoria Larsson	Did not start					
	Sweden	Henrik Jansson	Did not start					

=== Finals ===
Rank	Country	Athletes	Series					Total
Rank	Country	Athletes	1	2	3	4	5	Total
Gold medal match
1st place, gold medalist(s)	Italy 1	Simona Scocchetti; Gabriele Rossetti	7	5	8	5	8	6
2nd place, silver medalist(s)	Cyprus 2	Anastasia Eleftheriou; Andreas Chasikos	7	5	7	6	6	4
Bronze medal match
3rd place, bronze medalist(s)	Great Britain 1	Amber Rutter; Ben Llewellin	8	7	7	8	6	6
4	Ukraine	Iryna Malovichko; Mykola Milchev	7	7	7	8	6	4
