= 2019 European Shotgun Championships =

- Dates: 3–17 September
- Host city: Lonato del Garda, Italy
- Level: Senior & junior
- Events: 3 men + 3 women (individual); 3 men + 3 women + 2 mixed (team)

The 2019 European Shotgun Championships was the 51st edition of the global shotgun competition, European Shotgun Championships, organised by the European Shooting Confederation.

== Senior events ==
=== Men ===
Event	Gold	Silver	Bronze
Trap	Jiri Liptak (CZE)	Aaron Heading (GBR)	Mauro De Filippis (ITA)
Trap Team	Italy; Mauro De Filippis; Valerio Grazini; Giovanni Pellielo	Croatia; Josip Glasnović; Anton Glasnović; Marko Germin	France; Sebastian Guerrero; Clement Bourgue; Antonin Desert
Double Trap (Note: Medals were not awarded in this event owing to a lack of entries)	Daniele Di Spigno (ITA)	Ignazio Tronca (ITA)	Andrea Vescovi (ITA)
Skeet	Jakub Tomeček (CZE)	Tammaro Cassandro (ITA)	Nikolaos Mavrommatis (GRE)
Skeet Team	Czech Republic; Jakub Tomeček; Tomas Nydrle; Jaroslav Lang	France; Emmanuel Petit; Éric Delaunay; Anthony Terras	Cyprus; Dimitris Konstantinou; George Kazakos; Georgios Achilleos

=== Women ===
Event	Gold	Silver	Bronze
Trap	Daria Semianova (RUS)	Jessica Rossi (ITA)	Alessandra Perilli (SMR)
Trap Team	Italy; Fiammetta Rossi; Jessica Rossi; Silvana Stanco	Spain; María Quintanal; Fátima Gálvez; Beatriz Martínez	Great Britain; Abbey Ling; Sarah Wixey; Charlotte Hollands
Double Trap	Claudia De Luca (ITA)	Sofia Maglio (ITA)	Anne Focan (BEL)
Skeet	Danka Barteková (SVK)	Andri Eleftheriou (CYP)	Barbora Šumová (CZE)
Skeet Team	Italy; Diana Bacosi; Chiara Cainero; Simona Scocchetti	Slovakia; Danka Barteková; Lucia Kopcanová; Veronika Sýkorová	Russia; Zilia Batyrshina; Albina Shakirova; Anna Zhadnova

=== Mixed ===
Event	Gold	Silver	Bronze
Trap Team	Spain 1 Fátima Gálvez; Alberto Fernández	France 1 Carole Cormenier; Antonin Desert	Italy 1 Jessica Rossi; Mauro De Filippis
Skeet Team	Russia; Zilia Batyrshina; Nikolai Tiopliy	France; Lucie Anastassiou; Anthony Terras	Great Britain; Amber Hill; Ben Llewellin

== Junior events ==
=== Men ===
Event	Gold	Silver	Bronze
Trap	Murat İlbilgi (TUR)	Lorenzo Ferrari (ITA)	Jason Picaud (FRA)
Trap Team	Finland; Teemu Ruutana; Matias Koivu; Juho Mäkelä	Great Britain; Michael Bovingdon; Thomas Betts; Theo Ling	Italy; Lorenzo Ferrari; Matteo Dambrosi; Edoardo Antonioli
Double Trap	Jacopo Duprè De Foresta (ITA)	Marco Carli (ITA)	Lorenzo Franquillo (ITA)
Skeet	Alexandr Ivanov (RUS)	Sotiris Andreou (CYP)	Petros Englezoudis (CYP)
Skeet Team	Czech Republic; Daniel Korcak; Josef Stránský; Radek Prokop	Germany; Christopher Honkomp; Arne Hollensteiner; John Kellinghaus	Cyprus; Sotiris Andreou; Petros Englezoudis; Kleanthis Varnavides

=== Women ===
Event	Gold	Silver	Bronze
Trap	Mar Molné (ESP)	Sofia Littame (ITA)	Maria Inês de Barros (POR)
Trap Team	Russia; Polina Kniazeva; Polina Boiko; Tatiana Sarnskaia	Germany; Kathrin Murche; Marie-Louis Meyer; Johanna Brandt	Italy; Sofia Littame; Gaia Ragazzini; Greta Luppi
Skeet	Eva-Tamara Reichert (GER)	Vanessa Hocková (SVK)	Elena Bukhonova (RUS)
Skeet Team	Slovakia; Vanessa Hocková; Dominika Buzášová; Diana Marková	Russia; Elizaveta Evgrafova; Elena Bukhonova; Elizaveta Boiarshinova	Germany; Eva-Tamara Reichert; Johanna Wedekind; Maria Volkhardt

=== Mixed ===
Event	Gold	Silver	Bronze
Trap Team	Italy 1 Sofia Littame; Lorenzo Ferrari	Poland; Sandra Bernal; Remigiusz Charkiewicz	Italy 2 Gaia Ragazzini; Edoardo Antonioli
Skeet Team	Germany; Eva-Tamara Reichert; Christopher Honkomp	Russia; Elizaveta Evgrafova; Andrei Danilenkov	Cyprus; Anastasia Eleftheriou; Petros Englezoudis

== Medal table ==
* Host nation (Italy)

Rank	Nation	Gold	Silver	Bronze	Total
1	Italy*	4	4	5	13
2	Russia	4	2	2	8
3	Czech Republic	4	0	1	5
4	Germany	2	2	1	5
5	Slovakia	2	2	0	4
6	Spain	2	1	0	3
7	Finland	1	0	0	1
7	Turkey	1	0	0	1
9	France	0	3	2	5
10	Cyprus	0	2	4	6
11	Great Britain	0	2	2	4
12	Croatia	0	1	0	1
12	Poland	0	1	0	1
14	Greece	0	0	1	1
14	Portugal	0	0	1	1
14	San Marino	0	0	1	1
Totals (16 entries)		20	20	20	60

== See also ==
- 2019 European Shooting Championships
- European Shooting Confederation
- International Shooting Sport Federation
