= Shooting at the 2023 European Games – Women's trap =

Women's trap at the 2023 European Games
- Venue: Wrocław Shooting Centre
- Dates: 29–30 June
- Competitors: 30 from 21 nations

Medalists
gold medal	Jessica Rossi	Italy
silver medal	Satu Mäkelä-Nummela	Finland
bronze medal	Jana Špotáková	Slovakia

The women's trap event at the 2023 European Games took place on 29 and 30 June at the Wrocław Shooting Centre.

== Records ==
Prior to this competition, the existing world, European and Games records were as follows.

Qualification
World Record	Zuzana Rehák-Štefečeková (SVK)	125	Tokyo, Japan	29 July 2021
European Record	Zuzana Rehák-Štefečeková (SVK)	125	Tokyo, Japan	29 July 2021
Games Record	Fátima Gálvez (ESP)	114	Minsk, Belarus	29 June 2019

== Results ==
=== Qualification ===
Rank	Athlete	Country	Day 1			Day 2		Total	Notes
Rank	Athlete	Country	1	2	3	4	5	Total	Notes
1	Jessica Rossi	Italy	25	25	25	24	24	123	Q, GR
2	Alessandra Perilli	San Marino	22	24	24	25	25	120+4	Q
3	Carole Cormenier	France	25	24	23	24	24	120+3	Q
4	Satu Mäkelä-Nummela	Finland	24	25	23	25	22	119+8	Q
5	Fátima Gálvez	Spain	25	24	23	23	24	119+7	Q
6	Jana Špotáková	Slovakia	24	23	24	25	23	119+1	Q
7	Noora Antikainen	Finland	25	24	23	24	22	118+1	Q
8	Mar Molné	Spain	23	24	23	23	25	118+0	Q
9	Zina Hrdličková	Czech Republic	23	23	24	24	23	117	
10	Lucy Hall	Great Britain	24	22	23	23	24	116	
11	Rümeysa Pelin Kaya	Turkey	24	21	24	24	23	116	
12	Georgia Konstantinidou	Cyprus	24	23	24	24	21	116	
13	Safiye Sarıtürk Temizdemir	Turkey	18	25	24	23	25	115	
14	Maria Inês Barros	Portugal	22	24	22	24	23	115	
15	Aydan Jamalova	Azerbaijan	23	23	22	22	24	114	
16	Bettina Valdorf	Germany	22	22	25	22	23	114	
17	Sandra Bernal	Poland	21	25	22	24	22	114	
18	Aoife Gormally	Ireland	22	20	25	23	23	113	
19	Georgina Roberts	Great Britain	22	25	23	20	23	113	
20	Jasmina Maček	Slovenia	25	23	24	19	22	113	
21	Selin Ali	Bulgaria	23	22	22	21	24	112	
22	Giulia Grassia	Italy	24	22	20	23	23	112	
23	Kathrin Murche	Germany	24	21	23	19	24	111	
24	Mikaela Galea	Malta	22	20	21	24	23	110	
25	Loémy Recasens	France	22	23	22	21	21	109	
26	Emma Kortišová	Slovakia	20	23	21	22	21	107	
27	Petra Tömör-Tones	Hungary	18	21	22	21	24	106	
28	Olena Okhotska	Ukraine	22	22	22	18	21	105	
29	Ulviyya Eyvazova	Azerbaijan	21	22	21	21	20	105	
30	Lena Bidoli	Luxembourg	21	17	22	23	20	103	

=== Ranking matches ===
Rank	Athlete	Series					Total	Notes
Rank	Athlete	1	2	3	4	5	Total	Notes
1	Jessica Rossi (ITA)	4	5	4	4	5	22	Q
2	Noora Antikainen (FIN)	3	4	4	5	3	19	Q
3	Fátima Gálvez (ESP)	4	4	3	4	3	18	
4	Carole Cormenier (FRA)	3	4	3			10	

Rank	Athlete	Series					Total	Notes
Rank	Athlete	1	2	3	4	5	Total	Notes
1	Jana Špotáková (SVK)	3	5	5	4	5	22	Q
2	Satu Mäkelä-Nummela (FIN)	4	3	4	5	4	20+1	Q
3	Alessandra Perilli (SMR)	5	4	3	5	3	20+0	
4	Mar Molné (ESP)	2	5	4			11	

=== Medal match ===
Rank	Athlete	Series							Total
Rank	Athlete	1	2	3	4	5	6	7	Total
1st place, gold medalist(s)	Jessica Rossi (ITA)	4	4	4	4	4	4	4	28
2nd place, silver medalist(s)	Satu Mäkelä-Nummela (FIN)	3	3	5	4	3	5	3	26
3rd place, bronze medalist(s)	Jana Špotáková (SVK)	5	4	1	5	2			17
4	Noora Antikainen (FIN)	4	4	2					10
