= Shooting at the 2020 Summer Olympics – Men's skeet =

Olympic shooting event

Men's skeet at the Games of the XXXII Olympiad
- Olympic shooting pictogram
- Venue: Asaka Shooting Range
- Dates: 25–26 July
- Competitors: 30 from 22 nations
- Winning score: 59

Medalists
1st place, gold medalist(s)		Vincent Hancock	United States
2nd place, silver medalist(s)		Jesper Hansen	Denmark
3rd place, bronze medalist(s)		Abdullah Al-Rashidi	Kuwait

The Men's skeet event at the 2020 Summer Olympics took place on 25 and 26 July 2021 at the Asaka Shooting Range. After a disappointing showing in Rio, 2008 and 2012 champion Vincent Hancock of the United States rebounded to reclaim the gold medal, thus setting an Olympic record by becoming the first to win three gold medals in this event. Denmark's Jesper Hansen, after getting to the finals through three shoot-off rounds, won silver, the first Olympic medal in his career. The bronze was awarded to Kuwait's Abdullah Al-Rashidi, who was also the 2016 bronze medalist in skeet. The defending champion Gabriele Rossetti entered the competition but did not qualify for the finals.

== Records ==
Prior to this competition, the existing world and Olympic records were as follows.

Qualification records
World record	Valerio Luchini (ITA)	125	Beijing, China	9 July 2014
Olympic record	Abdullah Alrashidi (IOP); Marcus Svensson (SWE)	123	Rio de Janeiro, Brazil	13 August 2016

Final records
World record	Angad Vir Singh Bajwa (IND)	60	Kuwait City, Kuwait	6 November 2018
Olympic record	Not established	–	–	–

During the competition, Éric Delaunay and Tammaro Cassandro set the Olympic record in the qualification (124), whereas Vincent Hancock set the Olympic record in the finals (59).

== Schedule ==
All times are Japan Standard Time (UTC+9)

Date	Time	Round
Sunday, 25 July 2021; Monday, 26 July 2021	10:00	Qualification
Monday, 26 July 2021	15:50	Final

== Results ==
=== Qualification ===
Rank	Athlete	Country	1	2	3	4	5	Total	Shoot-off	Notes
1	Éric Delaunay	France	25	25	25	24	25	124	+6	Q, OR
2	Tammaro Cassandro	Italy	24	25	25	25	25	124	+5	Q, OR
3	Eetu Kallioinen	Finland	25	25	24	25	24	123		Q
4	Vincent Hancock	United States	25	25	25	25	22	122	+8	Q
5	Abdullah Al-Rashidi	Kuwait	25	25	24	25	23	122	+7	Q
6	Jesper Hansen	Denmark	25	24	23	25	25	122	+5+8+20	Q
7	Jakub Tomeček	Czech Republic	24	25	25	25	23	122	+5+8+19	
8	Nicolás Pacheco	Peru	24	24	25	25	24	122	+5+7	
9	Georgios Achilleos	Cyprus	25	24	24	25	24	122	+3	
10	Gabriele Rossetti	Italy	23	25	24	24	25	121 CB:37		
11	Emmanuel Petit	France	23	25	24	24	25	121 CB:28		
12	Dimitris Konstantinou	Cyprus	24	25	24	23	25	121		
13	Lee Jong-jun	South Korea	24	25	24	24	24	121		
14	Erik Watndal	Norway	25	24	25	23	24	121		
15	Phillip Jungman	United States	24	24	23	24	25	120 CB:47		
16	Mansour Al-Rashedi	Kuwait	24	24	23	24	25	120 CB:36		
17	Federico Gil	Argentina	25	23	25	23	24	120		
18	Angad Bajwa	India	24	25	24	23	24	120		
19	Azmy Mehelba	Egypt	25	24	24	24	23	120		
20	Nikolaos Mavrommatis	Greece	23	24	23	24	25	119		
21	Paul Adams	Australia	25	25	23	22	24	119		
22	Saeed Al-Mutairi	Saudi Arabia	24	24	23	25	23	119		
23	Stefan Nilsson	Sweden	25	24	23	24	23	119		
24	Saif Bin Futtais	United Arab Emirates	24	23	23	23	24	117		
25	Mairaj Ahmad Khan	India	25	24	22	23	23	117		
26	Emin Jafarov	Azerbaijan	25	23	23	22	23	116		
27	Hiroyuki Ikawa	Japan	23	23	23	22	23	114		
28	Lari Pesonen	Finland	23	25	23	24	19	114		
29	Mostafa Hamdy	Egypt	23	22	22	25	20	112		
30	Juan Schaeffer	Guatemala	21	22	22	23	19	107		

=== Final ===
Rank	Athlete	Series						Notes
Rank	Athlete	1	2	3	4	5	6	Notes
1st place, gold medalist(s)	Vincent Hancock (USA)	10	20	29	39	49	59	OR
2nd place, silver medalist(s)	Jesper Hansen (DEN)	9	19	29	39	48	55	
3rd place, bronze medalist(s)	Abdullah Al-Rashidi (KUW)	10	20	29	37	46		
4	Eetu Kallioinen (FIN)	10	20	28	36			
5	Éric Delaunay (FRA)	8	16	25				
6	Tammaro Cassandro (ITA)	8	16					
