= Shooting at the 2023 European Games – Men's skeet =

Men's skeet at the 2023 European Games
- Venue: Wrocław Shooting Centre
- Dates: 24–25 June
- Competitors: 30 from 20 nations

Medalists
| gold medal | Marcus Svensson | Sweden |
| silver medal | Dainis Upelnieks | Latvia |
| bronze medal | Eetu Kallioinen | Finland |

The men's skeet event at the 2023 European Games took place on 24 and 25 June at the Wrocław Shooting Centre.

== Records ==
Prior to this competition, the existing world, European and Games records were as follows.

Qualification
| World Record | Valerio Luchini (ITA) | 125 | Beijing, China | 9 July 2014 |
| European Record | Valerio Luchini (ITA) | 125 | Beijing, China | 9 July 2014 |
| Games Record | Anthony Terras (FRA) | 124 | Baku, Azerbaijan | 21 June 2015 |

== Results ==
=== Qualification ===
| Rank | Athlete | Country | Day 1 | | | Day 2 | | Total | Notes |
| Rank | Athlete | Country | 1 | 2 | 3 | 4 | 5 | Total | Notes |
|---|---|---|---|---|---|---|---|---|---|
| 1 | Tomáš Nýdrle | Czech Republic | 25 | 25 | 25 | 25 | 24 | 124+2 | Q, =GR |
| 2 | Peeter Jürisson | Estonia | 25 | 25 | 25 | 24 | 25 | 124+1+2 | Q, =GR |
| 3 | Dainis Upelnieks | Latvia | 25 | 25 | 25 | 24 | 25 | 124+1+1 | Q, =GR |
| 4 | Marcus Svensson | Sweden | 25 | 25 | 24 | 24 | 25 | 123+20 | Q |
| 5 | Henrik Jansson | Sweden | 25 | 23 | 25 | 25 | 25 | 123+19 | Q |
| 6 | Ben Llewellin | Great Britain | 25 | 24 | 25 | 25 | 24 | 123+9 | Q |
| 7 | Eetu Kallioinen | Finland | 24 | 25 | 24 | 24 | 25 | 122+38 | Q |
| 8 | Vincent Haaga | Germany | 24 | 24 | 24 | 25 | 25 | 122+37 | Q |
| 9 | Georgios Achilleos | Cyprus | 25 | 25 | 25 | 22 | 25 | 122+13 | |
| 10 | Jorgen Engen | Norway | 24 | 23 | 25 | 25 | 25 | 122+5 | |
| 11 | Sven Korte | Germany | 23 | 25 | 25 | 24 | 25 | 122+3 | |
| 12 | Emil Kjeldgaard Petersen | Denmark | 24 | 25 | 24 | 25 | 24 | 122+1+2+2 | |
| 13 | Mykola Milchev | Ukraine | 24 | 24 | 25 | 25 | 24 | 122+1+1 | |
| 14 | Éric Delaunay | France | 23 | 23 | 25 | 25 | 25 | 121 | |
| 15 | Kacper Baksalary | Poland | 24 | 24 | 24 | 24 | 25 | 121 | |
| 16 | Nikolaos Mavrommatis | Greece | 25 | 24 | 23 | 24 | 25 | 121 | |
| 17 | Jakub Tomeček | Czech Republic | 24 | 24 | 25 | 24 | 24 | 121 | |
| 18 | Charalampos Chalkiadakis | Greece | 24 | 25 | 24 | 24 | 24 | 121 | |
| 19 | Elia Sdruccioli | Italy | 25 | 24 | 24 | 24 | 24 | 121 | |
| 20 | Gabriele Rossetti | Italy | 25 | 24 | 24 | 24 | 24 | 121 | |
| 21 | Timi Vallioniemi | Finland | 25 | 24 | 25 | 24 | 23 | 121 | |
| 22 | Andreas Chasikos | Cyprus | 25 | 24 | 24 | 24 | 23 | 120 | |
| 23 | Marlon Attard | Malta | 22 | 24 | 24 | 24 | 25 | 119 | |
| 24 | Yaroslav Startsev | Georgia | 23 | 23 | 25 | 23 | 25 | 119 | |
| 25 | Karl Killander | Great Britain | 23 | 23 | 24 | 25 | 24 | 119 | |
| 26 | Clive Farrugia | Malta | 25 | 23 | 23 | 24 | 24 | 119 | |
| 27 | Jesper Hansen | Denmark | 25 | 23 | 24 | 23 | 24 | 119 | |
| 28 | Hákon Þór Svavarsson | Iceland | 23 | 22 | 24 | 25 | 24 | 118 | |
| 29 | Jack Fairclough | Ireland | 23 | 24 | 24 | 24 | 23 | 118 | |
| 30 | Tobias Haccou | Netherlands | 23 | 21 | 23 | 23 | 24 | 114 | |

=== Ranking matches ===
| Rank | Athlete | Series | | | Total | Notes |
| Rank | Athlete | 1 | 2 | 3 | Total | Notes |
|---|---|---|---|---|---|---|
| 1 | Dainis Upelnieks (LAT) | 10 | 10 | 10 | 30 | Q |
| 2 | Eetu Kallioinen (FIN) | 10 | 10 | 9 | 29 | Q |
| 3 | Henrik Jansson (SWE) | 9 | 10 | 8 | 27 | |
| 4 | Tomáš Nýdrle (CZE) | 10 | 8 | | 18 | |

| Rank | Athlete | Series | | | Total | Notes |
| Rank | Athlete | 1 | 2 | 3 | Total | Notes |
|---|---|---|---|---|---|---|
| 1 | Marcus Svensson (SWE) | 10 | 10 | 10 | 30 | Q |
| 2 | Peeter Jürisson (EST) | 9 | 9 | 9 | 27+12 | Q |
| 3 | Vincent Haaga (GER) | 9 | 9 | 9 | 27+11 | |
| 4 | Ben Llewellin (GBR) | 10 | 7 | | 17 | |

=== Medal match ===
| Rank | Athlete | Series | | | | Total |
| Rank | Athlete | 1 | 2 | 3 | 4 | Total |
|---|---|---|---|---|---|---|
| 1st place, gold medalist(s) | Marcus Svensson (SWE) | 10 | 10 | 10 | 8* | 38 |
| 2nd place, silver medalist(s) | Dainis Upelnieks (LAT) | 9 | 9 | 10 | 9 | 37 |
| 3rd place, bronze medalist(s) | Eetu Kallioinen (FIN) | 10 | 8 | 9 | | 27 |
| 4 | Peeter Jürisson (EST) | 9 | 8 | | | 17 |
