= Shooting at the 2019 European Games – Women's trap =

Women's trap at the 2019 European Games
- Venue: Sporting Club
- Dates: 22–23 June
- Competitors: 29 from 19 nations

Medalists
| gold medal | Silvana Stanco | Italy |
| silver medal | Jessica Rossi | Italy |
| bronze medal | Fátima Gálvez | Spain |

The women's trap event at the 2019 European Games in Minsk, Belarus took place from 22 to 23 June at the Sporting Club.

== Schedule ==
All times are FET (UTC+03:00)

| Date | Time | Event |
|---|---|---|
| Saturday, 22 June 2019 | 09:00 | Qualification day 1 |
| Sunday, 23 June 2019 | 09:00 | Qualification day 2 |
| Sunday, 23 June 2019 | 15:45 | Final |

== Records ==
Prior to this competition, the existing world, European and Games records were as follows.

Qualification
| World Record | Satu Mäkelä-Nummela (FIN) | 123 | Acapulco, Mexico | 18 March 2019 |
| European Record | Satu Mäkelä-Nummela (FIN) | 123 | Acapulco, Mexico | 18 March 2019 |
| Games Record | — | — | — | — |
Final
| World Record | Ashley Carroll (USA) | 48 | Guadalajara, Mexico | 5 March 2018 |
| European Record | Zuzana Rehák-Štefečeková (SVK) | 45 | Changwon, South Korea | 6 September 2018 |
| Games Record | — | — | — | — |

== Results ==
=== Qualification ===
The qualification round took place on 22 and 23 June to determine the qualifiers for the finals.

| Rank | Athlete | Country | Day 1 | Day 2 | Total | Notes |
|---|---|---|---|---|---|---|
| 1 | Fátima Gálvez | Spain | 70 | 44 | 114 | Q, GR |
| 2 | Silvana Stanco | Italy | 69 | 44 | 113 | Q |
| 3 | Marika Salmi | Finland | 64 | 48 | 112 | Q |
| 4 | Jessica Rossi | Italy | 68 | 42 | 110 | Q |
| 5 | Satu Mäkelä-Nummela | Finland | 67 | 42 | 109 | Q |
| 6 | Zuzana Rehák-Štefečeková | Slovakia | 67 | 40 | 107 | Q |
| 7 | Melanie Couzy | France | 65 | 41 | 106 | |
| 8 | Georgia Konstantinidou | Cyprus | 63 | 43 | 106 | |
| 9 | Jasmina Maček | Slovenia | 62 | 42 | 104 | |
| 10 | Abbey Ling | Great Britain | 62 | 41 | 103 | |
| 11 | Polina Kniazeva | Russia | 61 | 42 | 103 | |
| 12 | Sonja Scheibl | Germany | 64 | 39 | 103 | |
| 13 | Carole Cormenier | France | 63 | 40 | 103 | |
| 14 | Safiye Sarıtürk | Turkey | 63 | 40 | 103 | |
| 15 | Aoife Gormally | Ireland | 60 | 42 | 102 | |
| 16 | Adela Dohotaru | Romania | 64 | 38 | 102 | |
| 17 | Kirsty Barr | Great Britain | 63 | 38 | 101 | |
| 18 | Beatriz Martínez | Spain | 63 | 38 | 101 | |
| 19 | Alessandra Perilli | San Marino | 67 | 34 | 101 | |
| 20 | Daria Semianova | Russia | 60 | 40 | 100 | |
| 21 | Jana Špotáková | Slovakia | 60 | 40 | 100 | |
| 22 | Sandra Bernal | Poland | 61 | 39 | 100 | |
| 23 | Olena Okhotska | Ukraine | 64 | 35 | 99 | |
| 24 | Katrin Quooss | Germany | 59 | 39 | 98 | |
| 25 | Ana Rita Rodrigues | Portugal | 62 | 35 | 97 | |
| 26 | Maria Inês Coelho | Portugal | 60 | 36 | 96 | |
| 27 | Kateřina Janečková | Czech Republic | 56 | 34 | 90 | |
| 28 | Mikaela Galea | Malta | 50 | 39 | 89 | |
| 29 | Zina Hrdličková | Czech Republic | 56 | 28 | 84 | |

=== Final ===
The final round took place on 23 June to determine the final classification.

| Rank | Athlete | Series | | | | | | | | | | S-off | Notes |
| Rank | Athlete | 1 | 2 | 3 | 4 | 5 | 6 | 7 | 8 | 9 | 10 | S-off | Notes |
|---|---|---|---|---|---|---|---|---|---|---|---|---|---|
| 1st place, gold medalist(s) | Silvana Stanco (ITA) | 5 | 8 | 12 | 17 | 22 | 27 | 32 | 37 | 42 | 46 | | ER, GR |
| 2nd place, silver medalist(s) | Jessica Rossi (ITA) | 4 | 7 | 11 | 16 | 21 | 25 | 30 | 35 | 39 | 44 | | |
| 3rd place, bronze medalist(s) | Fátima Gálvez (ESP) | 4 | 9 | 12 | 16 | 21 | 26 | 31 | 34 | | | | |
| 4 | Marika Salmi (FIN) | 4 | 8 | 13 | 17 | 21 | 26 | 29 | | | | | |
| 5 | Satu Mäkelä-Nummela (FIN) | 1 | 5 | 9 | 12 | 17 | 20 | | | | | | |
| 6 | Zuzana Rehák-Štefečeková (SVK) | 4 | 6 | 10 | 12 | 16 | | | | | | | |
