= Shooting at the 2016 Summer Olympics – Men's skeet =

Men's skeet at the Games of the XXXI Olympiad
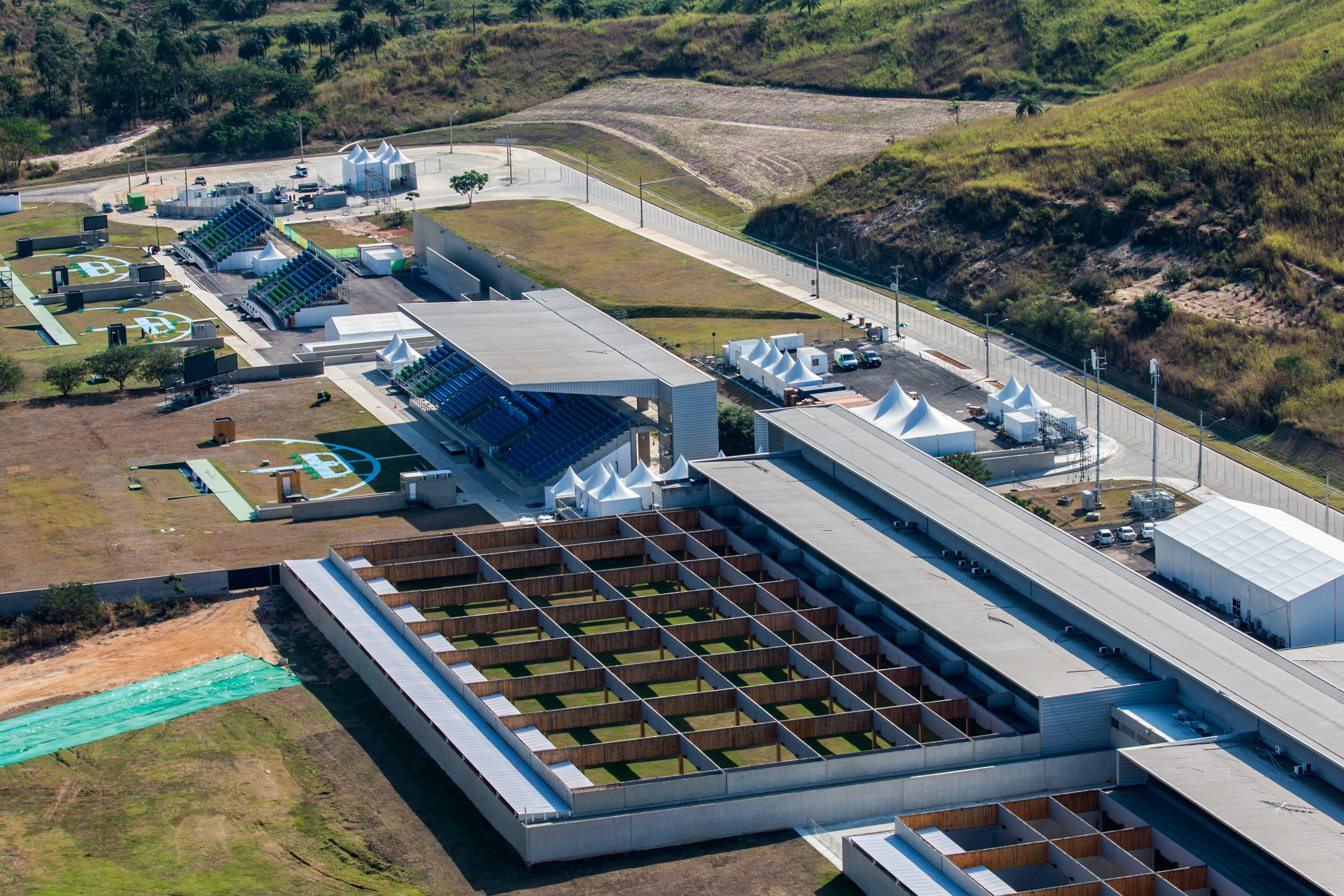
- Aerial view of the National Shooting Center in Deodoro, where the men's skeet event took place.
- Venue: National Shooting Center
- Date: 12–13 August 2016
- Competitors: 32 from 23 nations
- Winning score: 16/16 (in the gold medal match)

Medalists
1st place, gold medalist(s)		Gabriele Rossetti; Italy
2nd place, silver medalist(s)		Marcus Svensson; Sweden
3rd place, bronze medalist(s)		Abdullah Al-Rashidi; Independent Olympic Athletes

The Men's skeet event at the 2016 Olympic Games took place on 12 and 13 August 2016 at the National Shooting Center.

== Records ==
Prior to this competition, the existing world and Olympic records were as follows.

Qualification records
World record	Valerio Luchini (ITA)	125	Beijing, China	9 July 2014
Olympic record	ISSF Rule changed on January 1, 2013	—	—	—

== Results ==
=== Qualification round ===
Rank	Athlete	Country	1	2	3	4	5	Total	Shoot-off	Notes
1	Abdullah Al-Rashidi	Independent Olympic Athletes	24	25	25	25	24	123		Q, OR
2	Marcus Svensson	Sweden	25	25	25	24	24	123		Q, OR
3	Stefan Nilsson	Sweden	25	24	25	23	25	122		Q
4	Mykola Milchev	Ukraine	25	24	25	24	24	122		Q
5	Gabriele Rossetti	Italy	24	25	22	25	25	121	+12	Q
6	Jesper Hansen	Denmark	24	25	24	25	23	121	+12	Q
7	Éric Delaunay	France	24	25	25	24	24	121	+11	
8	Anthony Terras	France	24	23	25	24	25	121	+3	
9	Mairaj Ahmad Khan	India	24	25	23	25	24	121	+3	
10	Keith Ferguson	Australia	24	25	23	23	25	120		
11	Azmy Mehelba	Egypt	25	24	25	22	24	120		
12	Anton Astakhov	Russia	22	24	23	25	25	119		
13	Efthimios Mitas	Greece	23	24	22	25	25	119		
14	Dainis Upelnieks	Latvia	24	23	23	24	25	119		
15	Vincent Hancock	United States	23	24	24	24	24	119		
16	Andreas Chasikos	Cyprus	22	23	24	24	25	118		
17	Saeed Al Maktoum	United Arab Emirates	23	24	23	23	25	118		
18	Michael Maskell	Barbados	21	23	25	25	24	118		
19	Paul Adams	Australia	24	24	24	23	23	118		
20	Saud Habib	Independent Olympic Athletes	21	24	24	24	24	117		
21	Frank Thompson	United States	23	22	24	25	23	117		
22	Renato Portella	Brazil	24	22	21	25	24	116		
23	Ralf Buchheim	Germany	22	21	25	24	24	116		
24	Luigi Lodde	Italy	21	23	24	24	24	116		
25	Sebastian Kuntschik	Austria	22	22	24	24	24	116		
26	Juan Miguel Rodríguez	Cuba	24	21	23	25	23	116		
27	Federico Gil	Argentina	23	23	23	24	23	116		
28	Franco Donato	Egypt	22	23	23	24	23	115		
29	Saif bin Futtais	United Arab Emirates	21	23	24	23	23	114		
30	Ronaldas Račinskas	Lithuania	23	20	21	24	24	112		
31	Nasser Al-Attiyah	Qatar	21	22	21	24	23	111		
32	Rashid Saleh Hamad	Qatar	21	21	21	24	22	109		

=== Semifinal ===
Rank	Athlete	Country	Total	Shoot-off	Notes
1	Gabriele Rossetti	Italy	16		Gold Medal Match
1	Marcus Svensson	Sweden	16		Gold Medal Match
3	Mykola Milchev	Ukraine	15		Bronze Medal Match
4	Abdullah Al-Rashidi	Independent Olympic Athletes	14	+4	Bronze Medal Match
5	Jesper Hansen	Denmark	14	+3	
6	Stefan Nilsson	Sweden	14	+3	

=== Final (medal matches) ===
Rank	Athlete	Country	Total	Shoot-off	Notes
1st place, gold medalist(s)	Gabriele Rossetti	Italy	16		
2nd place, silver medalist(s)	Marcus Svensson	Sweden	15		
3rd place, bronze medalist(s)	Abdullah Al-Rashidi	Independent Olympic Athletes	16		
4	Mykola Milchev	Ukraine	14		
