= Shooting at the 2023 European Games – Men's team skeet =

Men's team skeet at the 2023 European Games
- Venue: Wrocław Shooting Centre
- Dates: 27 June
- Competitors: 18 from 6 nations
- Teams: 6

Medalists
| gold medal | Eetu Kallioinen; Tommi Takanen; Timi Vallioniemi | Finland |
| silver medal | Tammaro Cassandro; Gabriele Rossetti; Elia Sdruccioli | Italy |
| bronze medal | Charalampos Chalkiadakis; Nikolaos Mavrommatis; Efthimios Mitas | Greece |

The men's team skeet event at the 2023 European Games took place on 27 June at the Wrocław Shooting Centre.

== Records ==
Prior to this competition, the existing world, European and Games records were as follows.

Qualification
| World Record | — | — | — | — |
| European Record | Italy; Tammaro Cassandro; Luigi Lodde; Gabriele Rossetti | 221 | Larnaca, Cyprus | 11 September 2022 |
| Games Record | — | — | — | — |

== Results ==
=== Qualification ===
| Rank | Country | Athlete | Round | | | Total | Team total | Notes |
| Rank | Country | Athlete | 1 | 2 | 3 | Total | Team total | Notes |
|---|---|---|---|---|---|---|---|---|
| 1 | Finland | Tommi Takanen | 25 | 25 | 25 | 75 | 222 | QG, ER, GR |
| 1 | Finland | Eetu Kallioinen | 25 | 25 | 24 | 74 | 222 | QG, ER, GR |
| 1 | Finland | Timi Vallioniemi | 25 | 25 | 23 | 73 | 222 | QG, ER, GR |
| 2 | Italy | Tammaro Cassandro | 23 | 25 | 25 | 73 | 218 | QG |
| 2 | Italy | Elia Sdruccioli | 24 | 25 | 24 | 73 | 218 | QG |
| 2 | Italy | Gabriele Rossetti | 24 | 24 | 24 | 72 | 218 | QG |
| 3 | Germany | Vincent Haaga | 25 | 25 | 24 | 74 | 215 | QB |
| 3 | Germany | Sven Korte | 24 | 23 | 24 | 71 | 215 | QB |
| 3 | Germany | Felix Haase | 24 | 23 | 23 | 70 | 215 | QB |
| 4 | Greece | Efthimios Mitas | 25 | 23 | 24 | 72 | 213 | QB |
| 4 | Greece | Charalampos Chalkiadakis | 23 | 24 | 24 | 71 | 213 | QB |
| 4 | Greece | Nikolaos Mavrommatis | 24 | 23 | 23 | 70 | 213 | QB |
| 5 | Malta | Marlon Attard | 23 | 25 | 24 | 72 | 212 | |
| 5 | Malta | Clive Farrugia | 24 | 24 | 24 | 72 | 212 | |
| 5 | Malta | Marcello Attard | 22 | 22 | 24 | 68 | 212 | |
| 6 | Czech Republic | Tomáš Nýdrle | 23 | 24 | 25 | 72 | 210 | |
| 6 | Czech Republic | Radek Prokop | 23 | 22 | 24 | 69 | 210 | |
| 6 | Czech Republic | Jakub Tomeček | 23 | 22 | 24 | 69 | 210 | |
| | Cyprus | Georgios Achilleos | Did not start | | | | | |
| | Cyprus | Andreas Chasikos | Did not start | | | | | |
| | Cyprus | Nicolas Vasiliou | Did not start | | | | | |

=== Finals ===
| Rank | Country | Athletes | Series | | | | | Total |
| Rank | Country | Athletes | 1 | 2 | 3 | 4 | 5 | Total |
|---|---|---|---|---|---|---|---|---|
Gold medal match
| 1st place, gold medalist(s) | Finland | Eetu Kallioinen; Tommi Takanen; Timi Vallioniemi | 9 | 11 | 10 | 11 | 12 | 7 |
| 2nd place, silver medalist(s) | Italy | Tammaro Cassandro; Gabriele Rossetti; Elia Sdruccioli | 11 | 10 | 10 | 10 | — | 3 |
Bronze medal match
| 3rd place, bronze medalist(s) | Greece | Charalampos Chalkiadakis; Nikolaos Mavrommatis; Efthimios Mitas | 10 | 12 | 11 | 11 | | 6 |
| 4 | Germany | Vincent Haaga; Felix Haase; Sven Korte | 9 | 11 | 12 | 9 | | 2 |
