= Cyprus at the 2023 European Games =

- IOC code: CYP
- NOC: Cyprus Olympic Committee
- Website: www.olympic.org.cy

in Kraków and Małopolska, Poland 21 June – 2 July 2023
- Competitors: 74 in 8 sports
- Flag bearers: Constantina Nicolaou; Christos Achilleos
- Medals Ranked 36th: Gold 0 Silver 3 Bronze 2 Total 5

European Games appearances (overview)
- 2015; 2019; 2023; 2027

Cyprus competed at the 2023 European Games, in Kraków and Małopolska, Poland, from 21 June to 2 July 2023.

== Medallists ==
Medal	Name	Sport	Event	Date
Silver	Milan Trajkovic	Athletics	Men's 110 metres hurdles	24 June
Silver	Olivia Fotopoulou	Athletics	Women's 200 metres	25 June
Silver	Anastasia Eleftheriou; Andreas Chasikos	Shooting	Mixed team skeet	26 June
Bronze	Irene Kontou	Karate	Women's kumite 50 kg	22 June
Bronze	Kyriaki Kouttouki	Taekwondo	Women's 46 kg	23 June

== Competitors ==
Sport	Men	Women	Total
Archery	1	1	2
Athletics	22	25	47
Badminton	0	1	1
Boxing	2	0	2
Fencing	2	1	3
Karate	0	1	1
Shooting	4	6	10
Taekwondo	4	4	8
Total	35	39	74

== Archery ==
Recurve

Athlete	Event	Ranking round		Round of 64	Round of 32	Round of 16	Quarterfinals	Semifinals	Final / BM	
Athlete	Event	Score	Seed	Opposition Score	Opposition Score	Opposition Score	Opposition Score	Opposition Score	Opposition Score	Rank
Charalambos Charalambous	Men's individual	638	39	Sierakowski (POL)	Did not advance					
Elena Petrou	Women's individual	616	37	Sagoo (GBR); W w/o	Horáčková (CZE); L 3–7	Did not advance				
Charalambos Charalambous	Mixed team	1254	22	—N/a	Bye	Sweden; L 3–5	Did not advance			

== Athletics ==
Cyprus compete in the second division of the 2023 European Athletics Team Championships which was held in Chorzów during the Games.

=== European Athletics Team Championships Second Division ===
Team	Event		Event points																			Total	Rank
Team	Event		100m	200m	400m	800m	1500m	5000m	110m h*	400m h	3000m SC	4 × 100 m	4 × 400 m**	SP	JT	HT	DT	PV	HJ	TJ	LJ	Total	Rank
Cyprus	Team Championships Second Division	Men	8	3	4	11	1	15	16	7	3	6	4	3	5	12	7	0	13	7	8	288	12
Cyprus	Team Championships Second Division	Women	15	16	6	1	6	2	14	10	5	12	4	9	2	11	11	9	12	3	11	288	12

key: h: hurdles; SC; Steeplechase: SP; Shot put: JT: Javelin: HT: Hammer: DT: Discus: PV: Pole vault: HJ: High jump: TJ: Triple Jump: LJ: Long Jump

- Women compete at 100 metre hurdles, rather than 110 metre hurdles.
- 4 x 400 metres is held as a single mixed sex event

=== Individual events at the 2023 European Games ===
As a participant in the Team event, each nation automatically enters one athlete in each of the individual events.

Event	Male Athlete	Score	Rank	Female athlete	Score	Rank
100 m	Stavros Avgostinou	10.62	28	Olivia Fotopoulou	11.34	10
200 m	Stavros Avgostinou	21.57	36	Olivia Fotopoulou	22.71	2nd place, silver medalist(s)
400 m	Paisios Dimitriadis	47.54	32	Kalliopi Kountouri	54.13	29
800 m	Stavros Spyrou	1:49.30	21	Anastasia Papadovasilaki	2:20.08	42
1500 m	Andrea Gacumi Michara	3:49.95	37	Natalia Evangelidou	4:27.74	27
5000 m	Amine Khadiri	13:54.71	6	Eleni Ioannou	18:08.28	38
110/100 m h	Milan Trajkovic	13.38	2nd place, silver medalist(s)	Natalia Christofi	13.05	7
400m h	Anastasios Vasileiou	52.56	27	Kalypso Stavrou	59.61	24
3000m SC	Giorgos Tofi	9:22.34	34	Chrystalla Chadjipolydorou	10:58.32	33
4 × 100 m		40.61	25		44.63	16
4 × 400 m (mixed)	—N/a				3:26.00	30
Shot put	Petros Michaelides	16.05	35	Paraskeovulla Thrasyvoulou	14.39	26
Javelin	Spyros Savva	69.67	25	Christiana Ellina	40.51	36
Hammer	Alexandros Poursanidis	71.71	12	Valentina Savva	65.47	18
Discus	Giorgos Koniarakis	55.57	24	Androniki Lada	52.52	16
Pole vault	Christos Tamanis	NM		Andrea Vasou	3.65	25
High jump	Vasilios Konstantinou	2.21	8	Elena Kulichenko	1.91	7
Triple Jump	Grigoris Nikolaou	15.15	25	Nikoleta Chrysanthou	11.60	38
Long Jump	Antreas Machallekides	7.39	23	Filippa Kviten	6.34	14

== Badminton ==
Athletes	Event	Group stage				Round of 16	Quarter-finals	Semi-finals	Final	Rank
Athletes	Event	Opposition Score	Opposition Score	Opposition Score	Rank	Opposition Score	Opposition Score	Opposition Score	Opposition Score	Rank
Eleni Christodoulou	Women's singles	Gilmour (GBR); L (11–21, 9–21)	Dąbczyńska (POL); W (21–26, 22–20)	Laurens (NED); L (22–24, 16–21)	3	Did not advance				

== Boxing ==
Men

Athlete	Event	Round of 64	Round of 32	Round of 16	Quarterfinals	Semifinals	Final	
Athlete	Event	Opposition Result	Opposition Result	Opposition Result	Opposition Result	Opposition Result	Opposition Result	Rank
Alexandros Christodoulou	Light welterweight	—N/a	Kanlı (TUR); L 0–5	Did not advance				
Rafail Pafios	Light middleweight	Skogheim (NOR); L 0–5	Did not advance					

== Fencing ==
Men

Athlete	Event	Group Stage							Round of 64	Round of 32	Round of 16	Quarterfinals	Semifinals	Final	
Athlete	Event	Opposition Result	Opposition Result	Opposition Result	Opposition Result	Opposition Result	Opposition Result	Rank	Opposition Result	Opposition Result	Opposition Result	Opposition Result	Opposition Result	Opposition Result	Rank
Alexander Tofalides	Foil	De Greef (BEL); L 1–5	Cecet (MDA); W 5–0	Rosenfeld (ISR); L 3–5	Kuchta (SVK); W 5–4	Choupenitch (CZE); L 1–5	—N/a	4 Q	Choupenitch (CZE); L 11–15	Did not advancee					

Women

Athlete	Event	Group Stage							Round of 64	Round of 32	Round of 16	Quarterfinals	Semifinals	Final	
Athlete	Event	Opposition Result	Opposition Result	Opposition Result	Opposition Result	Opposition Result	Opposition Result	Rank	Opposition Result	Opposition Result	Opposition Result	Opposition Result	Opposition Result	Opposition Result	Rank
Iryna Mavrikiou	Épée	Stefanova (BUL); W 5–1	Muhari (HUN); W 5–1	Grabovskytė (LTU); W 5–4	Pawłowska (POL); L 3–5	Praxmarer (AUT); L 3–5	Varfolomyeyeva (UKR); L 4–5	3 Q	Bieleszová (CZE); L 10–15	Did not advancee					

== Karate ==
Kumite

Athlete	Event	Group stage				Semifinals	Final	
Athlete	Event	Opposition Result	Opposition Result	Opposition Result	Rank	Opposition Result	Opposition Result	Rank
Irene Kontou	Women's 50 kg	Kryva (UKR); W 3–0	Depta (POL); W 4–0	Plank (AUT); L 0–1	2 Q	Perfetto (ITA); L 0–1	Did not advance	3rd place, bronze medalist(s)

== Shooting ==
Men

Athlete	Event	Qualification		Ranking Match		Final	
Athlete	Event	Points	Rank	Points	Rank	Opponent	Rank
Georgios Achilleos	Skeet	122	9	Did not advance			
Andreas Chasikos	Skeet	120	22	Did not advance			
Andreas Makri	Trap	120	16	Did not advance			

Women

Athlete	Event	Qualification		Ranking Match		Final	
Athlete	Event	Points	Rank	Points	Rank	Opponent	Rank
Anastasia Eleftheriou	Skeet	115	16	Did not advance			
Konstantia Nikolaou	Skeet	110	25	Did not advance			
Georgia Konstantinidou	Trap	116	12	Did not advance			
Georgia Konstantinidou; Annita Kouukkouli; Despina Tsangaridou	Team trap	175	6	—N/a		Did not advance	

Mixed

Athlete	Event	Qualification		Final	
Athlete	Event	Points	Rank	Opponent	Rank
Georgios Achilleos; Konstantia Nikolaou	Team skeet	145	8	Did not advance	
Andreas Chasikos; Anastasia Eleftheriou	Team skeet	148	1 QG	Rossetti / Scocchetti (ITA); L 4–6	2nd place, silver medalist(s)
Andreas Makri; Georgia Konstantinidou	Team trap	139	13	Did not advance	

== Taekwondo ==
Men

Athlete	Event	Round of 32	Round of 16	Quarterfinals	Semifinals	Repechage	Final / BM	
Athlete	Event	Opposition Result	Opposition Result	Opposition Result	Opposition Result	Opposition Result	Opposition Result	Rank
Ioannis Pilavakis	63 kg	—N/a	Brečić (CRO); L 0–2	Did not advance		Stanić (SRB); L 0–2	Did not advance	
Christos Achilleos	80 kg	Jochman (CZE); L 0–2	Did not advance					
Andreas Theocharous	87 kg	—N/a	Biçer (TUR); L 0–2	Did not advance				
Andreas Stylianou	+87 kg	—N/a	Szaferski (POL); L WD	Did not advance				

Women

Athlete	Event	Round of 16	Quarterfinals	Semifinals	Repechage	Final / BM	
Athlete	Event	Opposition Result	Opposition Result	Opposition Result	Opposition Result	Opposition Result	Rank
Kyriaki Kouttouki	46 kg	Kamińska (POL); W 2–0	Nahurina (UKR); W 2–1	Stojković (CRO); L 0–2	—N/a	Akbarova (AZE); W 2–0	3rd place, bronze medalist(s)
Despina Pilavaki	53 kg	Pérez (ESP); L 0–2	Did not advance		Hronová (CZE); L 0–2	Did not advance	
Souzanna Tomazou	73 kg	Laurin (FRA); L 0–2	Did not advance				
Sofia Antoniou	+73 kg	Jahl (AUT); L 0–2	Did not advance				
