= Dimitris Konstantinou (sport shooter) =

Cypriot sport shooter

Personal information
- Nationality: Cypriot
- Born: June 8, 1988 (age 38) Paphos, Cyprus
- Height: 1.68 m (5 ft 6 in)
- Weight: 60 kg (132 lb)

Sport
- Sport: Shooting
- Event: Skeet
- Club: SKO Paphos
- Coached by: Piero Genga
Medal record
Men's shooting
Representing Cyprus
World Championships
Silver medal – second place	2019 Lonato del Garda	Skeet team
European Championships
Bronze medal – third place	2019 Lonato del Garda	Skeet team

Dimitris Konstantinou (Greek: Δημήτρης Κωνσταντίνου; born 8 June 1988) is a Cypriot sport shooter. He competed in the men's skeet event at the 2020 Summer Olympics.

== Career ==
Konstantinou won a silver medal at the 2019 World Shotgun Championships in the skeet team event. A few months later he won another skeet team medal, with Cyprus taking bronze at the 2019 European Shotgun Championships. He also reached the final shoot-off in the individual event, finishing in sixth place and securing his spot at the 2020 Summer Olympics in Tokyo. First-place finisher Jakub Tomeček had already qualified for Tokyo, and three other shooters ahead of Konstantinou came from countries who had already filled their quota places, meaning he and third-place finisher Nikolaos Mavrommatis received them instead.

The 2020 Summer Olympics were delayed due to the COVID-19 pandemic, during which Konstantinou placed second at the 2020 Paphos Skeet Cup. He also achieved an eighth-place finish at the second stage of the 2021 ISSF World Cup in New Delhi, his best-ever result at a World Cup competition. In Tokyo, Konstantinou placed 12th in the men's skeet event with a score of 121, failing to qualify for the final in his Olympic debut.
