= 2026 European Shotgun Championships =

- Dates: 27 September - 10 October
- Host city: Athens, Greece
- Level: Senior
- Events: 18
- Participation: 487 athletes from 40 nations

The 2026 European Shotgun Championships is the 55th edition of the global shotgun competition, European Shotgun Championships, organised by the European Shooting Confederation.

== Senior ==
=== Men ===
Event	Gold		Silver		Bronze	
Skeet	Eetu Kallioinen; Finland	31 (+4)	Mikola Milchev; Ukraine	31 (+3)	Henrik Jansson; Sweden	26
Skeet Team	Gabriele Rossetti; Tammaro Cassandro; Erik Pittini; Italy	365	Eetu Kallioinen; Tommi Takanen; Timi Vallioniemi; Finland	360	Jesper Hansen; Emil Kjeldgaard Petersen; Kasper Rasmussen; Denmark	359
Trap	N. Tolga Tuncer; Turkey	29 (+3)	Erik Varga; Slovakia	29 (+2)	Aaron Heading; Great Britain	24
Trap Team	Yavuz İlnam; N. Tolga Tuncer; Murat İlbilgi; Turkey	364	Erminio Frasca; Massimo Fabbrizi; Mauro De Filippis; Italy	364	Josip Glasnović; Giovanni Cernogoraz; Anton Glasnović; Croatia	364

=== Women ===
Event	Gold		Silver		Bronze	
Skeet	Amber Jo Rutter; Great Britain	34	Diana Bacosi; Italy	33	Victoria Larsson; Sweden	27
Skeet Team	Sara Bongini; Diana Bacosi; Martina Bartolomei; Italy	352	Amber Jo Rutter; Madeleine Zarina Russell; Phoebe Bodley-Scott; Great Britain	351	Anna Šindelářová; Barbora Šumová; Martina Kučerová; Czech Republic	343
Trap	Fátima Gálvez; Spain	26	Silvana Stanco; Italy	24	Jessica Rossi; Italy	20
Trap Team	Jessica Rossi; Silvana Stanco; Erica Sessa; Italy	359	Fátima Gálvez; Beatriz Martínez; Mar Molné Magriña; Spain	345	Sara Nummela; Satu Mäkelä-Nummela; Noora Antikainen; Finland	344

== Mixed ==
Event	Gold		Silver		Bronze	
Trap Team	Daria Semianova; Ramir Nikolaev; Individual Neutral Athletes	36 ER	Zuzana Rehak Stefecekov; Erik Varga; Slovakia	33	Zina Hrdlickova; Jiri Liptak; Czech Republic	24

== Junior ==
=== Men ===
Event	Gold		Silver		Bronze	
Skeet	Antonio La Volpe; Italy	34 EWRJ,EERJ	Fotios Baxevanakis; Greece	33	Henry Lungley; Great Britain	28
Skeet Team	Antonio La Volpe; Marco Coco; Antonio Bellu; Italy	357	Kirill Makarov; Egor Ivanov; Pavel Golubev; Individual Neutral Athletes	354	Aapo Jaakko Ylimaeki; Lassi Akseli Matias Kauppinen; Artturi Edvard Ervasti; Finland	353
Trap	Egemen Agca; Turkey	27	Georgios Kounadinis; Greece	25	Alessandro Materazzo; Italy	22
Trap Team	Luca Gerri; Andrea Diana; Francesco Tanfoglio; Italy	355	Egemen Agca; Huseyin Efe Ozmen; Fehmi Gezer; Turkey	351	Enzo Dury; Thomas Agez; Louis Desert; France	351

=== Women ===
Event	Gold		Silver		Bronze	
Skeet	Emilie Bundan; Germany	31	Ielyzaveta Pyvovarova; Ukraine	31	Jessica Louise Hambrook; Great Britain	27
Skeet Team	Kseniia Shuliak; Varvara Zaitseva; Olesia Atamanenko; Individual Neutral Athletes	342	Arianna Nember; Dalia Buselli; Eleonora Ruta; Italy	341	Katy Jane Essex; Jessica Louise Hambrook; Bethany Lilian Norton; Great Britain	340
Trap	Valentina Archetti; Italy	28 EWRJ, EERJ	Greta Sforzi; Italy	26	Anna Nyitrai; Hungary	20
Trap Team	Olga Niellen-Dezecache; Jeanne Auriche; Chloe Dutang; France	342	Valentina Archetti; Martina Montani; Maria Iovinella; Italy	336	Aleksandra Kosmina; Dara Chupina; Kseniia Samofalova; Individual Neutral Athletes	335

=== Mixed ===
Event	Gold		Silver		Bronze	
Trap Team	Isabella Margaret Mackintosh; Thomas William Betts; Great Britain	32	Irene Delrey Ruiz; Eduard Salichs; Spain	27	Anna Nyitrai; Bence Doeboerhegyi; Hungary	19

== Medal table ==
=== Senior ===
* Host nation (Greece)

Rank	Nation	Gold	Silver	Bronze	Total
1	Italy	3	3	1	7
2	Turkey	2	0	0	2
3	Finland	1	1	1	3
3	Great Britain	1	1	1	3
5	Spain	1	1	0	2
6	Individual Neutral Athletes	1	0	0	1
7	Slovakia	0	2	0	2
8	Ukraine	0	1	0	1
9	Czech Republic	0	0	2	2
9	Sweden	0	0	2	2
11	Croatia	0	0	1	1
11	Denmark	0	0	1	1
Totals (12 entries)		9	9	9	27

=== Junior ===
* Host nation (Greece)

Rank	Nation	Gold	Silver	Bronze	Total
1	Italy	4	3	1	8
2	Individual Neutral Athletes	1	1	1	3
3	Turkey	1	1	0	2
4	Great Britain	1	0	3	4
5	France	1	0	1	2
6	Germany	1	0	0	1
7	Greece	0	2	0	2
8	Spain	0	1	0	1
8	Ukraine	0	1	0	1
10	Hungary	0	0	2	2
11	Finland	0	0	1	1
Totals (11 entries)		9	9	9	27
