= Jessica Rossi =

Italian sport shooter (born 1992)

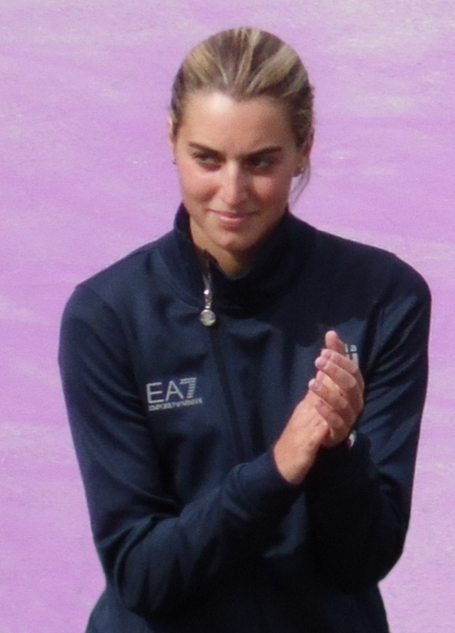
- Rossi in 2012

Personal information
- Born: 7 January 1992 (age 34) Cento, Italy
- Height: 1.70 m (5 ft 7 in)
- Weight: 55 kg (121 lb)

Sport
- Country: Italy
- Sport: Shooting
- Event: Trap shooting
- Club: Fiamme Oro
Medal record
Women's shooting
Representing Italy
Event	1st	2nd	3rd
Olympic Games	1	0	0
World Championships	10	2	3
World Cup Final	1	2	0
World Cup	2	5	1
European Championships	2	3	1
Total	16	12	5
Olympic Games
Gold medal – first place	2012 London	Trap
World Championships
Gold medal – first place	2009 Maribor	Trap
Gold medal – first place	2009 Maribor	Trap team
Gold medal – first place	2010 Munich	Trap team
Gold medal – first place	2013 Lima	Trap
Gold medal – first place	2013 Lima	Trap team
Gold medal – first place	2017 Moscow	Trap
Gold medal – first place	2018 Changwon	Trap team
Gold medal – first place	2022 Osijek	Trap team
Gold medal – first place	2023 Baku	Trap team
Gold medal – first place	2026 Doha	Trap team
Gold medal – first place	2026 Doha	Trap
Gold medal – first place	2026 Doha	Trap mixed team
Silver medal – second place	2014 Granada	Trap team
Silver medal – second place	2023 Baku	Trap
Bronze medal – third place	2010 Munich	Trap
Bronze medal – third place	2017 Moscow	Trap team
Bronze medal – third place	2019 Lonato	Trap team
European Games
Gold medal – first place	2023 Kraków-Małopolska	Trap
Gold medal – first place	2023 Kraków-Małopolska	Team trap
Gold medal – first place	2023 Kraków-Małopolska	Mixed team trap
Silver medal – second place	2019 Minsk	Trap
Silver medal – second place	2019 Minsk	Mixed team trap
European Championships
Gold medal – first place	2009 Osijek	Trap
Gold medal – first place	2026 Athens	Team Trap
Silver medal – second place	2012 Larnaca	Trap
Silver medal – second place	2019 Lonato	Trap
Silver medal – second place	2024 Lonato	Team trap
Bronze medal – third place	2026 Athens	Trap

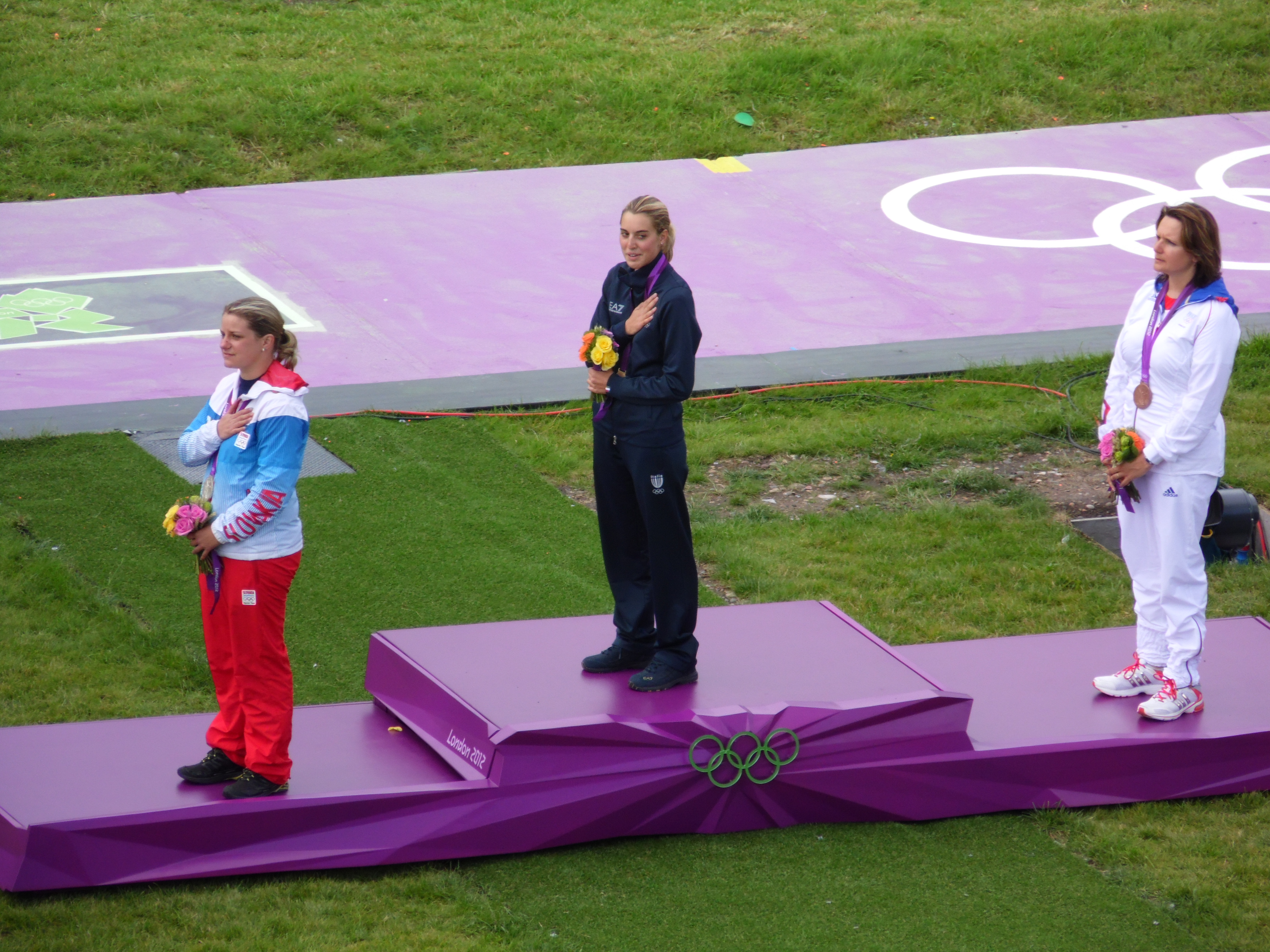
Rossi at the 2012 London Olympics

Jessica Rossi (born 7 January 1992) is a female Italian sports shooter. She has won Olympic gold and three world titles in the women's trap event.

== Biography ==
She took up shooting in 2001. Her father Ivan had also competed in shooting for Italy. She won the gold medal in the Women's Trap event at the 2012 Summer Olympics, where she scored a world record of 75 in the qualification and a world record of 99 in the final. At the time of the 2012 Olympics, she was working as a police officer. She also competed at the 2016 and 2020 Summer Olympics.

She has won three world titles in the women's trap, in 2009, 2013 and 2017, alongside silver in 2023 and bronze in 2010. She has also won six world championships in the women's team trap event, in 2009, 2010, 2013 (with Francesca Caporuscio and Silvana Stanco), 2018, 2022 and 2023, alongside silver in 2014, and bronze in 2017 and 2019.

At European level, she won the women's trap event twice (in 2009, and 2013) alongside three silvers (2012, 2019 and 2021) and two bronze medals (2015, 2022), the women's team event twice (in 2019 and 2022, with silver in 2021) and the mixed team event twice (2021 and 2022, with bronze in 2019). She also won two gold medals at the 2023 European Games, one in the women's trap and one in the mixed team trap event, following silver medals in the same events at the 2019 European Games.

In 2013, she was the ISSF women's shooter of the year. She was also selected to be Italy's flag-bearer at the 2020 Olympics.

== Records ==
Current world records held in Trap
Women	Qualification	75	Jessica Rossi (ITA)	Aug 4, 2012	London (GBR)
Women	Final	99	Jessica Rossi (ITA) (75+24)	Aug 4, 2012	London (GBR)
Junior Women	Individual	75	Jessica Rossi (ITA)	Aug 4, 2012	London (GBR)
World records held in Trap (2018–2025)
Mixed Team	Final	47	Jessica Rossi (Italy); Giovanni Pellielo (Italy)	August 5, 2018	Leobersdorf (AUT)

== Achievements ==
World Championships

Year	Competition	Venue	Rank	Event	Score	Notes
2009	World Shotgun Championships	(Slovenia) Maribor	1st	Trap	92	
2009	World Shotgun Championships	(Slovenia) Maribor	1st	Trap team	211	(Note: With Deborah Gelisio and Giulia Iannotti)
2010	World Shooting Championships	(Germany) Munchen	3rd	Trap	91	
2010	World Shooting Championships	(Germany) Munchen	1st	Trap team	211	(Note: With Deborah Gelisio and Giulia Iannotti)
2013	World Shotgun Championships	(Peru) Lima	1st	Trap	94	
2013	World Shotgun Championships	(Peru) Lima	1st	Trap team	206	(Note: With Federica Caporuscio and Silvana Stanco)
2014	World Shooting Championships	(Spain) Granada	2nd	Trap team	213	(Note: With Deborah Gelisio and Silvana Stanco)
2017	World Shotgun Championships	(Russia) Moscow	1st	Trap	43	
2017	World Shotgun Championships	(Russia) Moscow	3rd	Trap team	203	(Note: With Alessia Iezzi and Silvana Stanco)
2014	World Shooting Championships	(China) Changwon	1st	Trap team	343	(Note: With Alessia Iezzi and Silvana Stanco) WR
2019	World Shotgun Championships	(Italy) Lonato	3rd	Trap team	343	(Note: With Maria Palmitessa and Silvana Stanco)
2022	World Shotgun Championships	(Croatia) Osijek	1st	Trap team	214	(Note: With Alessia Iezzi and Giulia Grassia)
2023	World Shooting Championships	(Azerbaijan) Baku	2nd	Trap	39	
2023	World Shooting Championships	(Azerbaijan) Baku	1st	Trap team	354	(Note: With Maria Palmitessa and Silvana Stanco) EWR

== See also ==
- Italian sportswomen multiple medalists at Olympics and World Championships

== Notes ==
Olympic Games
Preceded by Federica Pellegrini	Flagbearer for Italy (with Elia Viviani); Tokyo 2020	Succeeded by Incumbent
