= Shooting at the 2023 European Games – Women's team trap =

Women's team trap at the 2023 European Games
- Venue: Wrocław Shooting Centre
- Dates: 2 July
- Competitors: 18 from 6 nations
- Teams: 6

Medalists
gold medal	Giulia Grassia; Jessica Rossi; Silvana Stanco	Italy
silver medal	Rümeysa Pelin Kaya; Dilara Bedia Kızılsu; Safiye Temizdemir	Turkey
bronze medal	Sarah Bindrich; Kathrin Murche; Bettina Valdorf	Germany

The women's team trap event at the 2023 European Games took place on 2 July at the Wrocław Shooting Centre.

== Records ==
Prior to this competition, the existing world, European and Games records were as follows.

Qualification
World Record	—	—	—	—
European Record	Italy; Giulia Grassia; Jessica Rossi; Silvana Stanco	215	Larnaca, Cyprus	29 August 2022
Games Record	—	—	—	—

== Results ==
=== Qualification ===
Rank	Country	Athlete	Round			Total	Team total	Notes
Rank	Country	Athlete	1	2	3	Total	Team total	Notes
1	Italy	Jessica Rossi	25	24	25	74	210	QG, GR
1	Italy	Silvana Stanco	23	23	23	69	210	QG, GR
1	Italy	Giulia Grassia	22	22	23	67	210	QG, GR
2	Turkey	Safiye Sarıtürk Temizdemir	24	24	24	72	206	QG
2	Turkey	Rümeysa Pelin Kaya	21	24	22	67	206	QG
2	Turkey	Dilara Bedia Kızılsu	24	22	21	67	206	QG
3	Finland	Mopsi Veromaa	22	23	25	70	202	QB
3	Finland	Noora Antikainen	21	24	22	67	202	QB
3	Finland	Satu Mäkelä-Nummela	23	21	21	65	202	QB
4	Germany	Kathrin Murche	24	24	22	70	196	QB
4	Germany	Bettina Valdorf	21	24	23	68	196	QB
4	Germany	Sarah Bindrich	21	18	19	58	196	QB
5	Azerbaijan	Aydan Jamalova	23	18	23	64	187	
5	Azerbaijan	Ulviyya Eyvazova	21	19	23	63	187	
5	Azerbaijan	Alina Rafikhanova	20	20	20	60	187	
6	Cyprus	Despina Tsangaridou	21	22	24	67	175	
6	Cyprus	Georgia Konstantinidou	21	22	23	66	175	
6	Cyprus	Annita Koukkoulli	14	12	16	42	175	

=== Finals ===
Rank	Country	Athletes	Series					Total
Rank	Country	Athletes	1	2	3	4	5	Total
Gold medal match
1st place, gold medalist(s)	Italy	Giulia Grassia; Jessica Rossi; Silvana Stanco	14	13	11			6
2nd place, silver medalist(s)	Turkey	Rümeysa Pelin Kaya; Dilara Bedia Kızılsu; Safiye Temizdemir	11	12	6*			0
Bronze medal match
3rd place, bronze medalist(s)	Germany	Sarah Bindrich; Kathrin Murche; Bettina Valdorf	12	12	12	12	12	5+2
4	Finland	Noora Antikainen; Satu Mäkelä-Nummela; Mopsi Veromaa	13	11	13	12	9	5+1
