= Taekwondo at the 2023 European Games – Women's 46 kg =

Taekwondo competition

Women's 46 kg at the 2023 European Games
- Venue: Krynica-Zdrój Arena
- Date: 23 June
- Competitors: 16 from 16 nations

Medalists
gold medal	Lena Stojković	Croatia
silver medal	Sofia Zampetti	Italy
bronze medal	Kyriaki Kouttouki	Cyprus
bronze medal	Süheda Nur Çelik	Germany

The women's 46 kg competition in taekwondo at the 2023 European Games took place on 23 June at the Krynica-Zdrój Arena.

== Schedule ==
All times are Central European Summer Time (UTC+2).

Date	Time	Event
Friday, 23 June 2023	09:00	Round of 16
Friday, 23 June 2023	14:00	Quarterfinals
Friday, 23 June 2023	15:36	Semifinals
Friday, 23 June 2023	16:24	Repechage
Friday, 23 June 2023	19:00	Bronze medal bouts
Friday, 23 June 2023	20:00	Final

== Results ==
Round of 16
Lena Stojković (CRO)	10	14
Hanna Csáki (HUN)	0	6
Ana Jiménez (ESP)	5	15	3
Phoenix Goodman (GBR)	6	7	8
Dalya Rehani (FRA)	13	7
Viktoriia Nahurna (UKR)	13	10
Kyriaki Kouttouki (CYP)	10	13
Anita Kamińska (POL)	8	1
Dina Pouryounes (EOR)	5	2	5^{P}
Lana Komnenović (SRB)	4	8	7
Sofia Zampetti (ITA)	5	5
Minaya Akbarova (AZE)	3	0
Süheda Nur Çelik (GER)	16	13
Rukiye Yıldırım (TUR)	8	5
Ida Tammila (FIN)	10	0
Rivka Bayech (ISR)	17	12

Quarterfinals
Lena Stojković (CRO)	4	10
Phoenix Goodman (GBR)	1	5
Viktoriia Nahurna (UKR)	4	10	5
Kyriaki Kouttouki (CYP)	2	15	6
Dina Pouryounes (EOR)	6	7
Sofia Zampetti (ITA)	13	19
Süheda Nur Çelik (GER)	19	22
Rivka Bayech (ISR)	11	14

Semifinals
Lena Stojković (CRO)	11	17
Kyriaki Kouttouki (CYP)	3	7
Sofia Zampetti (ITA)	7	14
Süheda Nur Çelik (GER)	2	8

Final
Lena Stojković (CRO)	17	14
Sofia Zampetti (ITA)	4	10

=== Repechage ===
Repechage
Phoenix Goodman (GBR)	11	17
Hanna Csáki (HUN)	2	6
Minaya Akbarova (AZE)	4	6
Dina Pouryounes (EOR)	2	4

Bronze medal bout
Süheda Nur Çelik (GER)	13	8
Phoenix Goodman (GBR)	2	8
Minaya Akbarova (AZE)	0	2
Kyriaki Kouttouki (CYP)	9	2
