= Renato Portella =

Brazilian sports shooter

Personal information
- Born: 5 December 1962 (age 63)

Sport
- Sport: Sports shooting

Renato Portella (born 5 December 1962) is a Brazilian sports shooter. He competed in the men's skeet event at the 2016 Summer Olympics.
