= Safiye Sarıtürk Temizdemir =

Turkish sport shooter (born 1995)

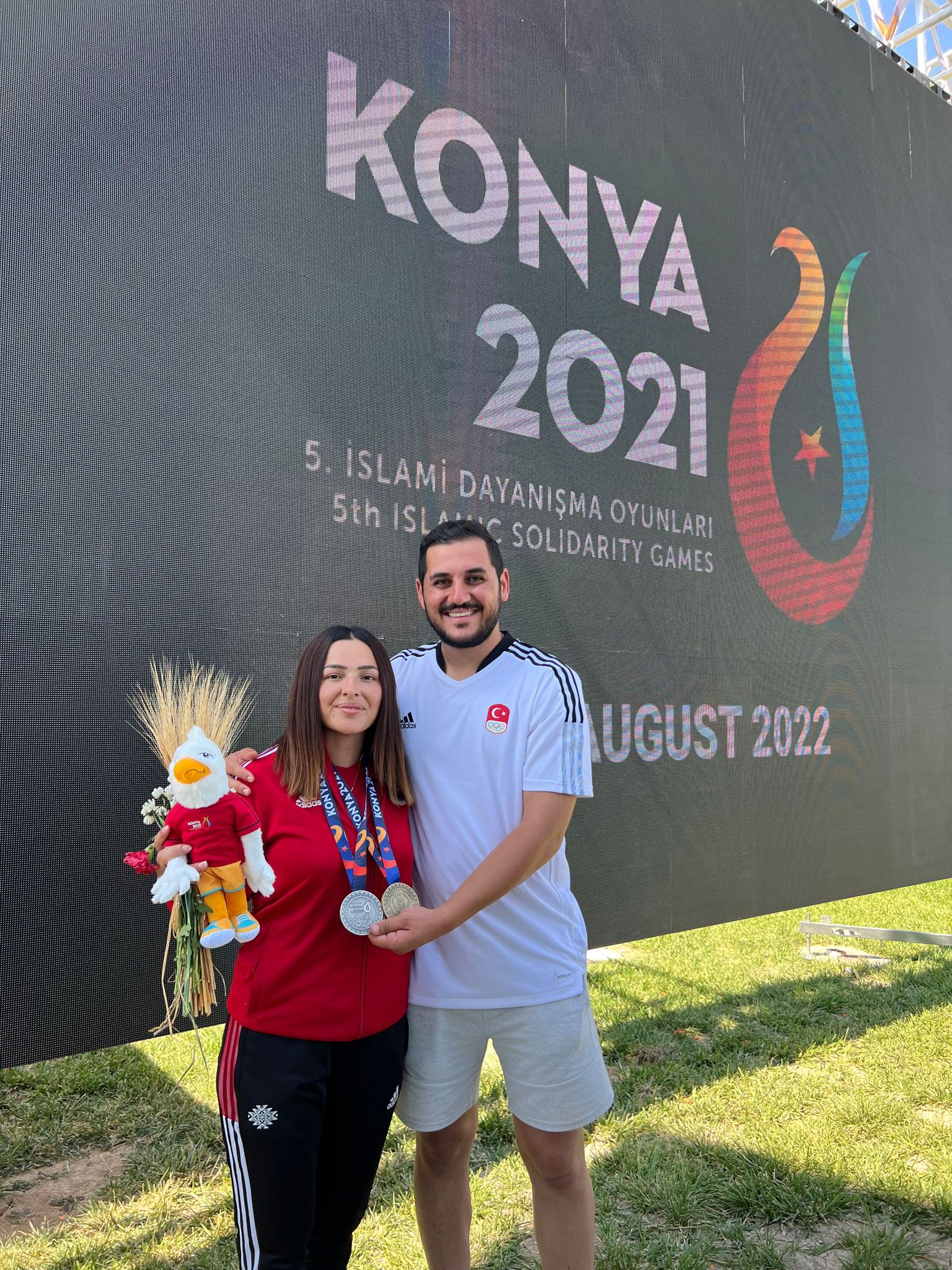
- Sarıtürk Temizdemir with husband

Personal information
- Nationality: Turkish
- Born: Safiye Sarıtürk; 12 October 1995 (age 31) Kahramanmaraş, Turkey
- Height: 1.63 m (5 ft 4 in)
- Weight: 52 kg (115 lb)

Sport
- Country: Turkey
- Sport: Shooting
- Event: Trap
- Club: Ankara Aski Spor Kulübü
Medal record
Women's shooting
Representing Turkey
World Championships
Bronze medal – third place	2026 Doha	Trap team
European Games
Silver medal – second place	2023 Kraków-Małopolska	Team trap
European Shotgun Championships
Silver medal – second place	2022 Larnaca	Mixed team trap
Bronze medal – third place	2018 Leobersdorf	Team trap
Bronze medal – third place	2013 Suhl	Junior team trap
Mediterranean Games
Gold medal – first place	2026 Taranto	Trap
Gold medal – first place	2026 Taranto	Mixed team trap
Islamic Solidarity Games
Gold medal – first place	2021 Konya	Mixed team trap
Silver medal – second place	2021 Konya	Trap
World Shotgun Championships
Silver medal – second place	2011 Belgrade	Junior trap

Safiye Sarıtürk Temizdemir, née Safiye Sarıtürk (born 12 October 1995), is a Turkish sport shooter competing in the trap event. She married Enes Temizdemir on 7 November 2021. In addition to her sports career, she also works as a physical education teacher.

== Sports career ==
Sarıtürk Temizdemir obtained her license in 2010 and is a member of Kahramanmaraş Gençlik S.K. She has competed in various domestic competitions. She is coached by Ali Emre Guray. Her height is 1.63 m (5 ft 4 in), and she weighs 52 kg (115 lb).

She won the silver medal in the Junior category at the 2011 World Shotgun Championships in Belgrade, Serbia. In 2013, she earned a bronze medal in the team trap event at the European Shotgun Championships in Suhl, Germany. She claimed another bronze in the mixed team trap event at the 2018 European Shotgun Championships in Leobersdorf, Austria. She also competed at the 2018 Mediterranean Games in Tarragona, Spain, and at the 2019 European Games in Minsk, Belarus.

She secured bronze medals in the mixed team trap events at both the 2020 ISSF World Cup in Nicosia, Cyprus, and the 2021 ISSF World Cup in New Delhi, India. In the 2021 Islamic Solidarity Games in Konya, Turkey, she won a silver medal. She participated in the 2022 Mediterranean Games in Oran, Algeria, and took the gold medal in the mixed team event, as well as a silver medal in the individual trap event at the 2022 Grand Prix in Konya, Turkey. She also won the silver medal in the mixed team trap event at the 2022 European Shotgun Championships in Larnaca, Cyprus.

She won the silver medal in the individual trap event at the first leg of the 2023 ISSF World Cup held in Rabat, Morocco between 11–24 January . Despite being affected by the 2023 Turkey earthquake, which also severely devastated her hometown on 6 February 2023, she competed at the 2023 ISSF World Cup's fourth leg in Doha, Qatar on 4–13 March and won a bronze medal. She was able to recover her training gear and competition shotgun from the intact trunk of her car, which was trapped under the wreckage during the 2023 earthquake. She also secured a silver medal in the team trap event at the 2023 European Games in Wrocław, Poland, alongside teammates Dilara Bedia Kızılsu and Rümeysa Pelin Kaya.

She shares the current world record in the mixed team trap event with the United States and Australia teams, scoring 149 out of 150 points in Guadalajara, Mexico.

At the 2026 Mediterranean Games in Taranto, Italy, she became champion in the individual trap event. She won another gold medal in the mixed team trap event with Yavuz İlnam at the same competition.

== Personal life ==
Born on 12 October 1995, Safiye Sarıtürk Temizdemir, née Safiye Sarıtürk, is a native of Kahramanmaraş, Turkey. She studied at the Physical Education School of Kahramanmaraş Sütçüimam University and works as a physical education teacher.

During the 2023 Turkey earthquake, which significantly hit also her hometown Kahramanmaraş, her home was destroyed and her car was buried under the rubble, she was rescued from under the debris.
