= Rümeysa Pelin Kaya =

Turkish sport shooter (born 2000)

Personal information
- Nationality: Turkish
- Born: 6 August 2000 (age 26) Kahramanmaraş, Turkey
- Height: 1.59 m (5 ft 3 in)
- Weight: 55 kg (121 lb)

Sport
- Country: Turkey
- Sport: Shooting
- Event: Trap
- Club: Kahramanmaraş Gençlik S.K.
Medal record
Women's shooting
Representing Turkey
World Championships
Bronze medal – third place	2026 Doha	Trap team
Bronze medal – third place	2026 Doha	Trap mixed team
European Games
Silver medal – second place	2023 Kraków-Małopolska	Team trap
European Championships
Bronze medal – third place	2024 Lonato	Trap

Rümeysa Pelin Kaya (born 6 August 2000) is a Turkish sport shooter competing in trap event.

== Sport career ==
Kaya obtained her license in 2014. She is a member of Kahramanmaraş Gençlik S.K. She competed at various domestic competitions.

In the Mixed team trap event of the 2022 ISSF World Cup, she shared the gold medal with Murat İlbilgi in Nicosia, Cyprus and the bronze medal with Tolga Tunçer in Baku, Azerbaijan. She took the bronze medal in the Mixed team event of the 2022 Grand Prix in Konya, Turkey. She took part at the 2022 Mediterranean Games in Oran, Algeria without any success. Although she became a victim of the 2023 Turkey earthquake, which devastated her hometown on 6 February, she took part at the 2023 ISSF World Cup in Doha, Qatar in 4–13 March. She and her teammate Tolga Tunçer placed fourth in the Mixed team event. She won the silver medal in the Team trap event at the 2023 European Games held in Wrocław, Poland, along with teammates Dilara Bedia Kızılsu and Safiye Sarıtürk Temizdemir.

== Personal life ==
Born on 6 August 2000, Rümeysa Pelin Kaya is a native of Kahramanmaraş, Turkey. She studied at the Faculty of Sport Science of Kahramanmaraş Sütçüimam University graduating in 2022.
