= Dilara Bedia Kızılsu =

Turkish sport shooter

Personal information
- Nationality: Turkish
- Born: Dilara Bedia Minare; 25 April 1965 (age 61) Gemlik, Bursa, Turkey

Sport
- Country: Turkey
- Sport: Shooting
- Event: Trap
- Club: Bursa Merkez Avcılık-Atıcık S.K.
Medal record
Women's shooting
Representing Turkey
European Games
Silver medal – second place	2023 Kraków-Małopolska	Team trap

Dilara Bedia Kızılsu, née Dilara Bedia Minare (born 25 April 1965), is a Turkish sport shooter competing in the trap event.

== Sport career ==
Kızılsu started with shooting in 2001, and obtained her license in 2011. She is a member of "Bursa Merkez Avcılık-Atıcılık S.K." ("Hunting-Shooting Sports Club"). She competed at various domestic competitions.

She won the silver medal in the Team trap event at the 2023 European Games held in Wrocław, Poland, along with teammates Rümeysa Pelin Kaya and Safiye Santürk Temizdemir.

== Personal life ==
Born on 25 April 1965, Dilara Bedia Kızılsu, née Dilara Bedia Minare, is a native of Gemlik in Bursa Province, Turkey. Her spouse Alp Kızılsu is also a trap sport shooter.
