= Eetu Kallioinen =

Finnish sport shooter (born 1998)

Personal information
- Nationality: Finnish
- Born: 23 May 1998 (age 28) Loppi, Finland

Sport
- Sport: Shooting
Medal record
Men's shooting
Representing Finland
World Championships
| Silver medal – second place | 2023 Baku | Skeet |
| Silver medal – second place | 2026 Doha | Team skeet |
| Bronze medal – third place | 2015 Lonato | Team skeet |
European Games
| Gold medal – first place | 2023 Kraków-Małopolska | Team skeet |
| Bronze medal – third place | 2023 Kraków-Małopolska | Skeet |
European Championships
| Gold medal – first place | 2026 Athens | Skeet |
| Silver medal – second place | 2026 Athens | Skeet team |
| Bronze medal – third place | 2021 Osijek | Skeet |

Eetu Kallioinen (born 23 May 1998) is a Finnish sport shooter. He won a bronze medal in skeet at the 2021 European Shooting Championships. He represented Finland at the 2020 Summer Olympics in Tokyo 2021, competing in men's skeet.
