= Tammaro Cassandro =

Italian sport shooter (born 1993)

Personal information
- Nationality: Italian
- Born: 5 April 1993 (age 33) Capua, Italy
- Height: 1.73 m (5 ft 8 in)
- Weight: 68 kg (150 lb)

Sport
- Country: Italy
- Sport: Shooting
- Event: Skeet
- Club: Carabinieri
Medal record
Men's shooting
Representing Italy
World Championships
Gold medal – first place	2014 Granada	Skeet team
Gold medal – first place	2017 Moscow	Skeet team
Gold medal – first place	2022 Osijek	Skeet team
Silver medal – second place	2018 Changwon	Skeet team
Silver medal – second place	2019 Lonato del Garda	Skeet
Bronze medal – third place	2017 Moscow	Mixed skeet team
Bronze medal – third place	2019 Lonato del Garda	Skeet team
Bronze medal – third place	2023 Baku	Skeet team
European Games
Silver medal – second place	2023 Kraków-Małopolska	Skeet team
European Championships
Gold medal – first place	2014 Sarlóspuszta	Skeet team
Gold medal – first place	2022 Larnaca	Skeet team
Gold medal – first place	2023 Osijek	Skeet team
Gold medal – first place	2025 Chateauroux	Skeet team
Gold medal – first place	2026 Athens	Skeet team
Silver medal – second place	2017 Baku	Skeet team
Silver medal – second place	2019 Lonato del Garda	Skeet
Silver medal – second place	2022 Larnaca	Mixed skeet team
Silver medal – second place	2024 Lonato	Skeet team
Silver medal – second place	2025 Chateauroux	Skeet
Bronze medal – third place	2021 Osijek	Skeet team
Bronze medal – third place	2023 Osijek	Skeet
Bronze medal – third place	2023 Osijek	Mixed team skeet
Mediterranean Games
Silver medal – second place	2022 Oran	Mixed skeet team
Universiade
Silver medal – second place	2013 Kazan	Skeet
Silver medal – second place	2013 Kazan	Skeet team

Tammaro Cassandro (born 5 April 1993) is an Italian sport shooter.

He participated at the 2018 ISSF World Shooting Championships, winning a medal.
