= Kyriaki Kouttouki =

Cypriot taekwondo practitioner

Personal information
- Born: 12 September 1996 (age 29)

Sport
- Country: Cyprus
- Sport: Taekwondo
- Weight class: 49 kg
Medal record
Women's taekwondo
Representing Cyprus
European Games
Bronze medal – third place	2023 Kraków-Małopolska	46 kg
Mediterranean Games
Bronze medal – third place	2013 Mersin	49 kg
Summer Universiade
Silver medal – second place	2017 Taipei	46 kg
Bronze medal – third place	2015 Gwangju	46 kg
Bronze medal – third place	2019 Naples	49 kg

Kyriaki Kouttouki (born 12 September 1996) is a Cypriot taekwondo practitioner. She won the silver medal in the women's 46 kg event at the 2017 Summer Universiade held in Taipei, Taiwan.

== Career ==
Kouttouki represented Cyprus at the 2013 Mediterranean Games held in Mersin, Turkey and she won one of the bronze medals in the women's 49 kg event. In 2013, she also competed in the women's finweight event at the World Taekwondo Championships held in Puebla, Mexico. In this competition she was eliminated in her second match by Itzel Manjarrez of Mexico.

In 2015, Kouttouki competed in the women's finweight event at the World Taekwondo Championships held in Chelyabinsk, Russia where she was eliminated in her third match by Iryna Romoldanova of Ukraine. In the same year, she also competed in the women's 49 kg event at the 2015 European Games held in Baku, Azerbaijan where she was eliminated in her first match by Ioanna Koutsou of Greece.

In 2019, Kouttouki competed in the women's finweight event at the World Taekwondo Championships held in Manchester, United Kingdom. She was eliminated in her first match against Hung Yu-ting of Chinese Taipei. In 2019, she also represented Cyprus at the Summer Universiade in Naples, Italy and she won one of the bronze medals in the women's –49 kg event.

In 2021, Kouttouki competed at the European Olympic Qualification Tournament held in Sofia, Bulgaria hoping to qualify for the 2020 Summer Olympics in Tokyo, Japan. In 2022, she competed in the women's 49 kg event at the Mediterranean Games held in Oran, Algeria. She was eliminated in her first match.

She competed at the 2024 European Taekwondo Olympic Qualification Tournament held in Sofia, Bulgaria hoping to qualify for the 2024 Summer Olympics in Paris, France.
