= Bettina Valdorf =

German sport shooter (born 1997)

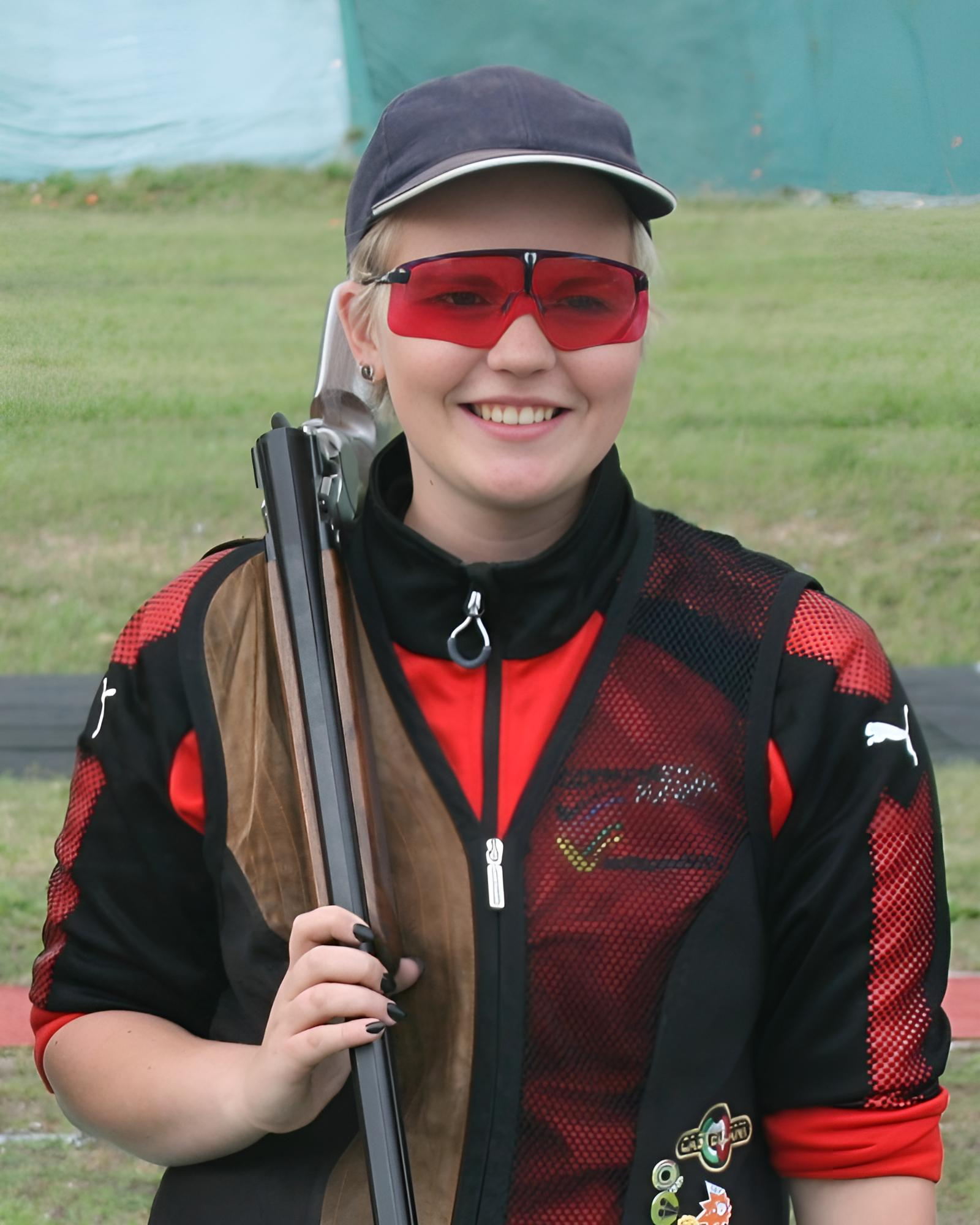

Personal information
- Born: 22 October 1997 (age 28)

Sport
- Sport: Shooting
- Event: Trap
Medal record
Women's shooting
Representing Germany
European Games
Bronze medal – third place	2023 Kraków-Małopolska	Team trap

Bettina Valdorf (born 22 October 1997) is a German sport shooter.
