= Marcus Svensson =

Swedish sport shooter (born 1990)

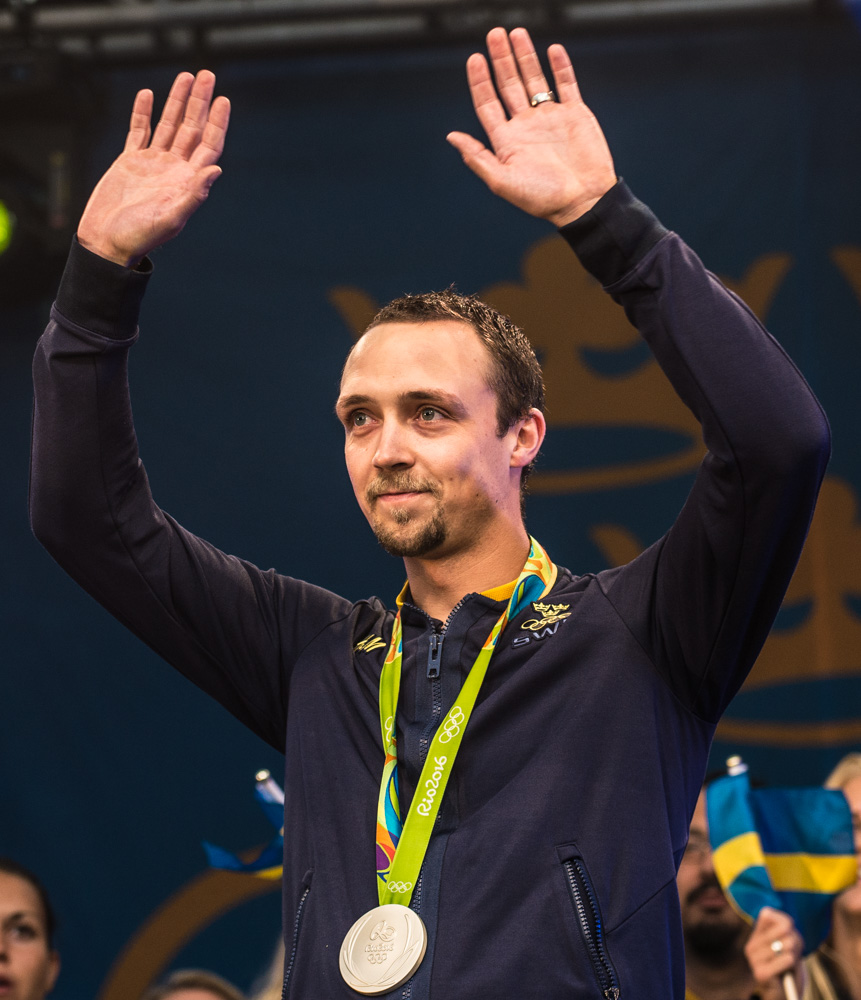

Personal information
- Nationality: Swedish
- Born: 22 March 1990 (age 36)

Sport
- Country: Sweden
- Sport: Shooting
Medal record
Men's shooting
Representing Sweden
Olympic Games
Silver medal – second place	2016 Rio de Janeiro	Skeet
World Championships
Gold medal – first place	2019 Lonato del Garda	Skeet team
European Games
Gold medal – first place	2023 Kraków-Małopolska	Skeet
European Championships
Bronze medal – third place	2017 Baku	Skeet team

Marcus Svensson (born 22 March 1990) is a Swedish sport shooter. At the 2012 Summer Olympics he competed in the Men's skeet, finishing in 7th place. At the 2016 Summer Olympics he competed in the Men's skeet and finished in second place, earning a silver medal for his native Sweden.
