= Andreas Makri =

Cypriot sports shooter (born 1991)

Personal information
- Nationality: Cypriot
- Born: 27 August 1991 (age 33); Paphos, Cyprus

Sport
- Sport: Sports shooting

Andreas Makri (born 27 August 1991) is a Cypriot sports shooter. He competed in the men's trap event at the 2020 Summer Olympics.
