= Silvana Stanco =

Italian sport shooter (born 1993)

Personal information
- Born: 6 January 1993 (age 33) Zürich, Switzerland
- Height: 1.61 m (5 ft 3 in)

Sport
- Country: Italy
- Sport: Shooting
- Event: Trap
- Club: Gruppo Sportivo Fiamme Gialle
Medal record
Women's shooting
Representing Italy
Olympic Games
Silver medal – second place	2024 Paris	Trap
World Championships
Gold medal – first place	2013 Lima	Trap team
Gold medal – first place	2018 Changwon	Trap team
Gold medal – first place	2023 Baku	Trap team
Gold medal – first place	2026 Doha	Trap team
Silver medal – second place	2014 Granada	Trap team
Silver medal – second place	2025 Athens	Trap
Silver medal – second place	2025 Athens	Trap team
Bronze medal – third place	2018 Changwon	Trap
Bronze medal – third place	2017 Moscow	Trap team
Bronze medal – third place	2019 Lonato del Garda	Trap team
European Games
Gold medal – first place	2019 Minsk	Trap
Gold medal – first place	2023 Kraków-Małopolska	Team trap
European Championships
Gold medal – first place	2016 Lonato del Garda	Trap
Gold medal – first place	2019 Lonato del Garda	Trap team
Gold medal – first place	2022 Larnaca	Trap
Gold medal – first place	2022 Larnaca	Trap team
Gold medal – first place	2024 Lonato del Garda	Mixed team trap
Gold medal – first place	2025 Chateauroux	Trap Team
Gold medal – first place	2026 Athens	Team Trap
Silver medal – second place	2016 Lonato del Garda	Trap
Silver medal – second place	2023 Osijek	Trap
Silver medal – second place	2024 Lonato del Garda	Team trap
Silver medal – second place	2026 Athens	Trap
Bronze medal – third place	2023 Osijek	Team trap
Mediterranean Games
Bronze medal – third place	2022 Oran	Trap
Bronze medal – third place	2026 Taranto	Mixed team trap
Universiade
Gold medal – first place	2013 Kazan	Trap team
Gold medal – first place	2015 Gwangju	Trap
Gold medal – first place	2015 Gwangju	Trap team
Silver medal – second place	2013 Kazan	Trap

Silvana Stanco (born 6 January 1993) is an Italian sport shooter.

== Career ==
She participated at the 2018 ISSF World Shooting Championships, winning a medal.

She gained a gold medal at the 2022 European Shooting Championships in Larnaca in Cyprus which also guaranteed that the Italy would be represented in the Olympics.
