= Dainis Upelnieks =

Latvian sport shooter (born 1982)

Personal information
- Nationality: Latvian
- Born: 1 October 1982 (age 43) Bauska, Latvian SSR
- Height: 1.93 m (6 ft 4 in)
- Weight: 103 kg (227 lb)

Sport
- Country: Latvia
- Sport: Shooting
Medal record
Men's shooting
Representing Latvia
European Games
Silver medal – second place	2023 Kraków-Małopolska	Skeet

Dainis Upelnieks (born 1 October 1982) is a Latvian shooter. He represented his country at the 2016 Summer Olympics.
