= Jesper Hansen (sport shooter) =

Danish sport shooter (born 1980)

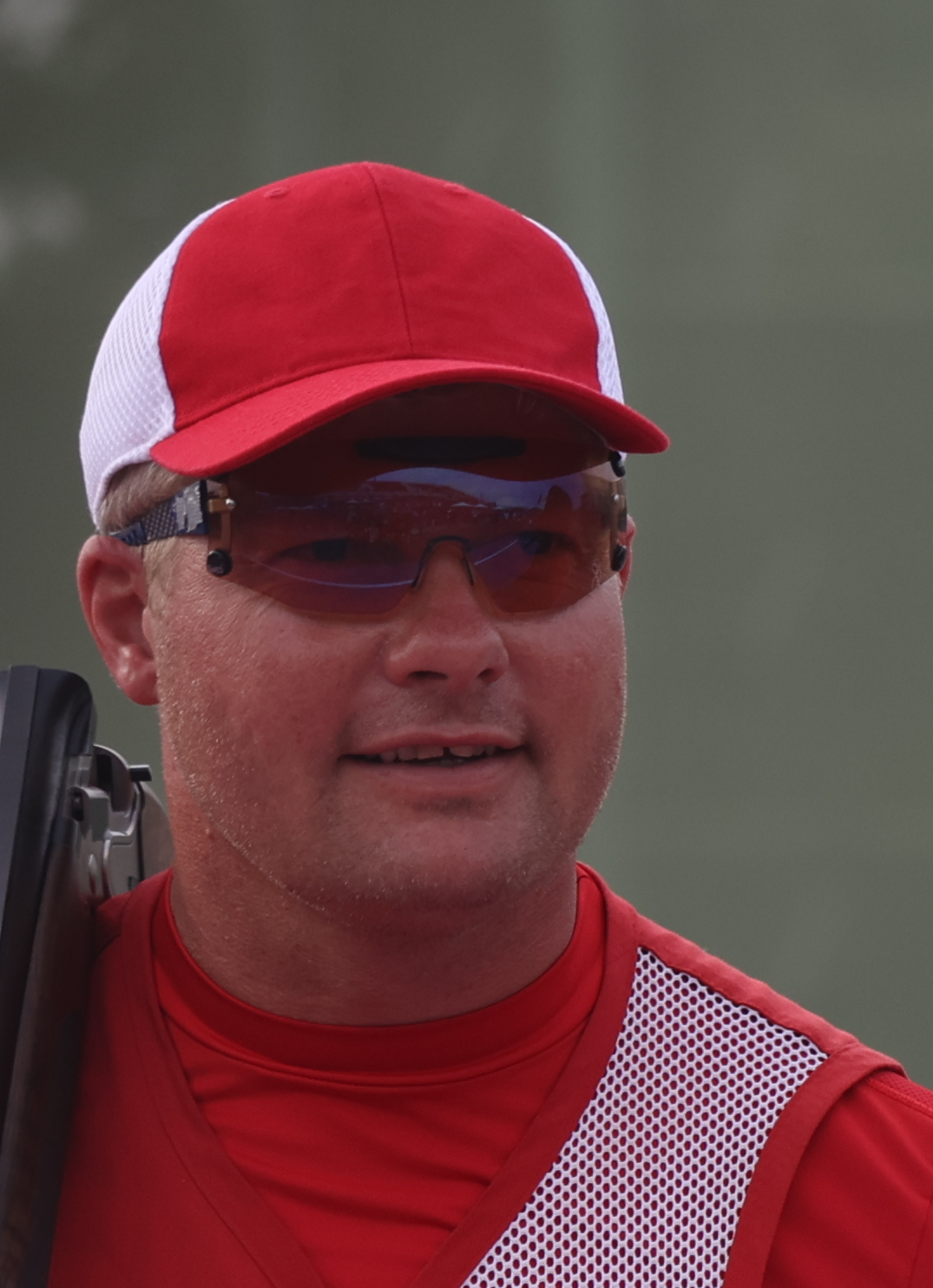
- Hansen in skeet at the 2020 Summer Olympic Games

Medal record

Men's shooting

Representing Denmark

Olympic Games
Silver medal – second place	2020 Tokyo	Skeet

ISSF World Championships
Gold medal – first place	2013 Lima	Skeet
Gold medal – first place	2026 Doha	Skeet

European Championships
Bronze medal – third place	2026 Athens	Skeet team

Jesper Hansen (born 19 November 1980 in Bjergsted) is a Danish sport shooter. At the 2012 Summer Olympics he competed in the Men's skeet, finishing in 26th place. In 2013, he won the skeet shooting world championship in Lima, Peru.

At the 2020 Summer Olympics in Tokyo, Hansen won a silver medal.
