= Konstantia Nikolaou =

Cypriot sport shooter (born 1984)

Personal information
- Nationality: Cypriot
- Born: 19 April 1984 (age 42)
- Height: 1.75 m (5 ft 9 in)
- Weight: 58 kg (128 lb)

Sport
- Country: Cyprus
- Sport: Shooting
- Event: Skeet
- Club: Famagusta shooting club
Medal record
Women's Shooting
Representing Cyprus
World Championships
Bronze medal – third place	2018 Changwon	Skeet team
Mediterranean Games
Bronze medal – third place	2026 Taranto	Skeet

Konstantia Nikolaou (born 19 April 1984) is a Cypriot sport shooter.

== Career ==
She participated at the 2018 ISSF World Shooting Championships, winning a medal.
