= Jana Špotáková =

Slovak sport shooter (born 1985)

Personal information
- Nationality: Slovak
- Born: 10 September 1985 (age 40)

Sport
- Sport: Sports shooting
Medal record
European Championships
Silver medal – second place	2023 Osijek	Trap team
European Games
Bronze medal – third place	2023 Kraków-Małopolska	Trap

Jana Špotáková (née Mezeiová) (born 10 September 1985) is a Slovak sports shooter.
