= Daria Semianova =

Russian sport shooter (born 2002)

Personal information
- Nationality: Russian
- Born: 13 August 2002 (age 24) Makhachkala, Russia

Sport
- Sport: Shooting
Medal record
Women's shooting
Representing Russia and AIN
World Championships
Bronze medal – third place	2026 Doha	Trap
European Games
Bronze medal – third place	2019 Minsk	Mixed trap

Daria Vitalyevna Semianova (Russian: Дарья Витальевна Семьянова; born 13 August 2002) is a Russian sport shooter. She represents Russia at the 2020 Summer Olympics in Tokyo.
