= Beatriz Martínez =

Spanish sport shooter

Personal information
- Nationality: Spanish
- Born: 6 March 1986 (age 40) Oviedo, Spain
- Height: 1.64 m (5 ft 5 in)
- Weight: 64 kg (141 lb)

Sport
- Country: Spain
- Sport: Shooting
- Event: Trap
- Club: Mieres, Las Acacias
Medal record
World Championships
Silver medal – second place	2018 Changwon	Trap team
European Championships
Silver medal – second place	2025 Chateauroux	Trap Team
Silver medal – second place	2026 Athens	Team Trap

Beatriz Martínez (born 6 March 1986) is a Spanish sport shooter.

She participated at the 2018 ISSF World Shooting Championships, winning a medal.
