= Carole Cormenier =

French sports shooter (born 1990)

Personal information
- Nationality: French
- Born: 13 February 1990 (age 36) Limoges, France

Sport
- Sport: Sports shooting
Medal record
Women's shooting
Representing France
World Championships
Gold medal – first place	2022 Osijek	Trap
European Championships
Silver medal – second place	2016 Lonato del Garda	Team trap
Silver medal – second place	2019 Lonato del Garda	Mixed team trap
Bronze medal – third place	2015 Maribor	Team trap
Bronze medal – third place	2021 Osijek	Trap
Bronze medal – third place	2021 Osijek	Team trap
Mediterranean Games
Gold medal – first place	2022 Oran	Trap

Carole Cormenier (born 13 February 1990) is a French sports shooter. She competed in the women's trap event at the 2020 Summer Olympics.
