= Leobersdorf =

- Municipality
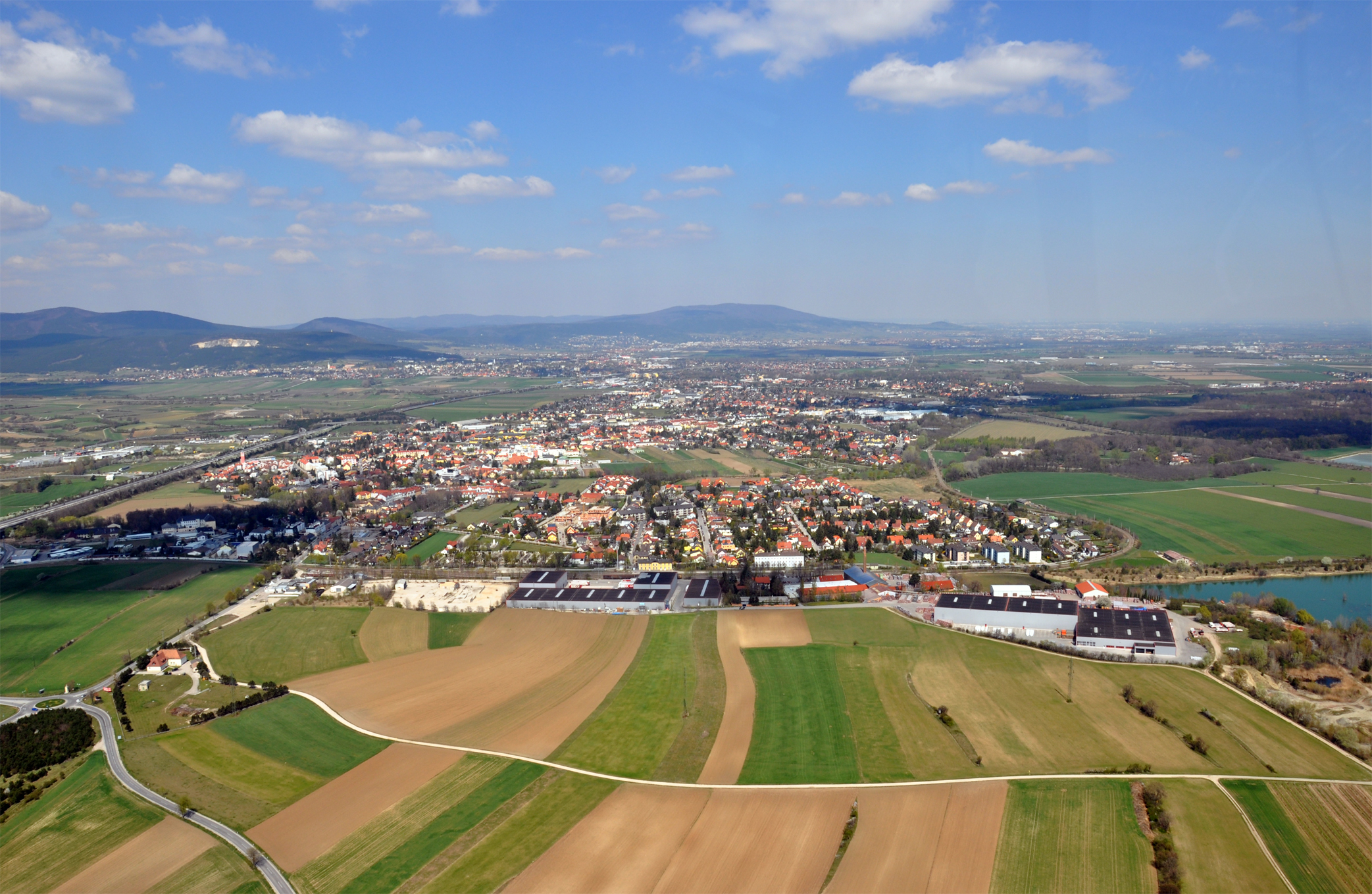
- Aerial view of Leobersdorf

- Coat of arms

- Location within Austria
- Coordinates: 47°55′N 16°13′E
- Country: Austria
- State: Lower Austria
- District: Baden

Government
  - Mayor: Andreas Ramharter

Area
  - Total: 12.35 km^{2} (4.77 sq mi)
- Elevation: 267 m (876 ft)

Population (2026)
  - Total: 5,365
  - Density: 434.4/km^{2} (1,125/sq mi)
- Time zone: UTC+1 (CET)
  - Summer (DST): UTC+2 (CEST)
- Postal code: 2544
- Area code: 02256
- Website: www.leobersdorf.at

Leobersdorf is a market town in the Baden district of Lower Austria, Austria.

== Geography ==
Leobersdorf is situated at the exit of the Triesting Valley on the edge of the Vienna Basin and is traversed by the Triesting River.

=== Municipal divisions ===
Leobersdorf consists of one catastral community (Katastralgemeinde) (Population as of 2025):

- Leobersdorf (5,344)

Leobersdorf can be further divided into one locality (Ortschaft) (Population as of 2025):

- Leobersdorf (5,344)

== History ==
=== Early settlements ===
First indices of settlement in the area date back to 3000 BC.

Around 350 BC Celtic settlers found Noricum, from their word Tristis, which means rushing or dangerous, derived the name for the river Triesting which flows through Leobersdorf.

About 15 AD, Noricum was taken peacefully by the Romans. They most likely built a watchtower where the church is currently standing.

=== Name ===
Leobersdorf was first named in the Bayrische Traditionsbücher (Bavarian Traditionbooks) as Liubetsendorf around 1165 / 1174. This name possibly derives from the old-Slavic name Ljubac or the Celtic word Lewer or Loben, which means Border- or Gravehill.

The name changed over time. In 1311 it was Lewbesdorf, 1350 Leubesdorf and finally, 1588, Leobersdorf.

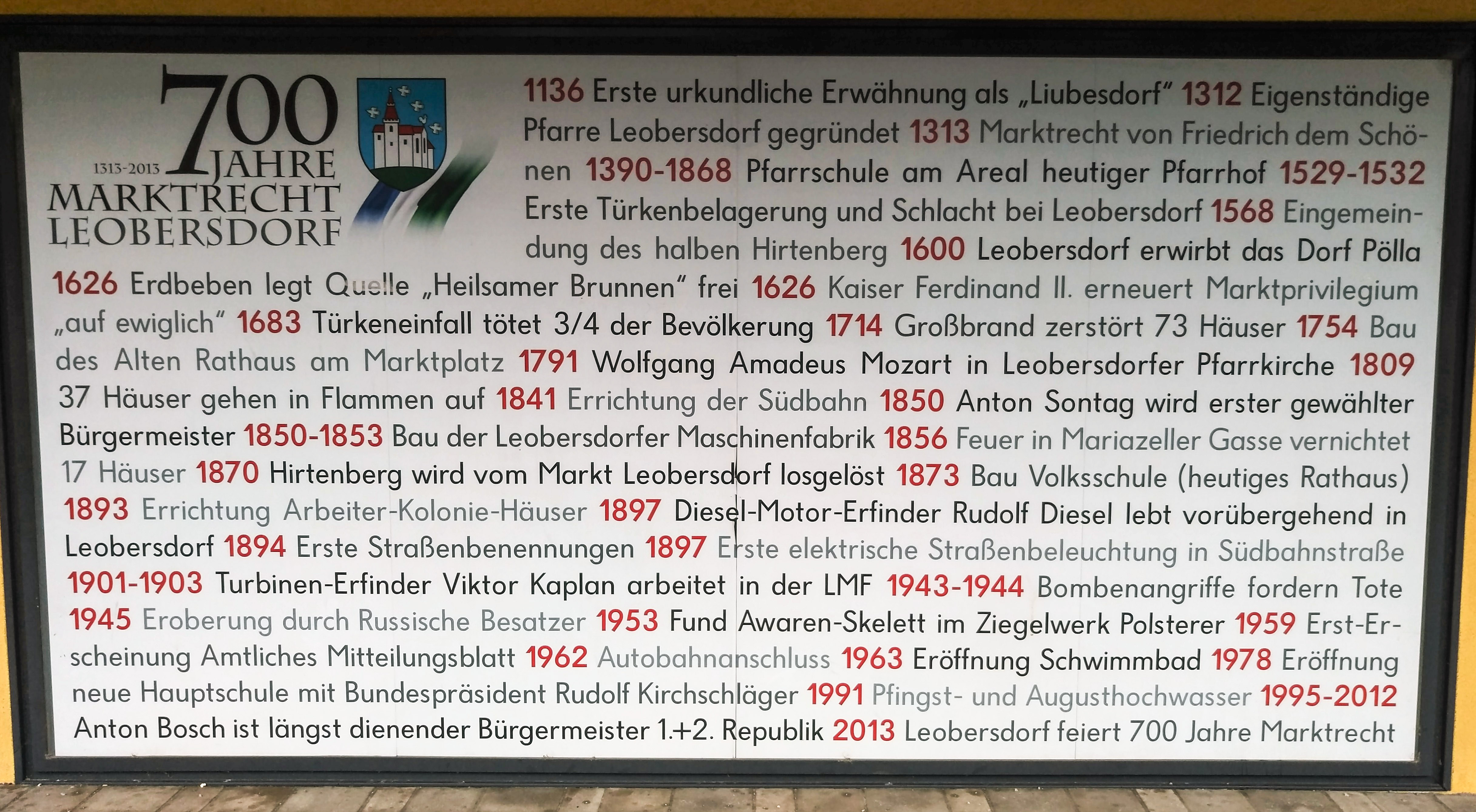
Important dates in the history of Leobersdorf

=== Archeological finds ===
Burial sites from the Avar Khaganate (650–800 CE) have been found in Leobersdorf, and the remains are mostly of East Asian ancestry.

== Demographics ==
Historical population
Year	Pop.	±%
1869	1,762	—
1880	1,939	+10.0%
1890	2,702	+39.4%
1900	3,558	+31.7%
1910	4,075	+14.5%
1923	3,969	−2.6%
1934	3,784	−4.7%
1939	3,793	+0.2%
1951	3,515	−7.3%
1961	3,396	−3.4%
1971	3,561	+4.9%
1981	3,486	−2.1%
1991	3,751	+7.6%
2001	4,145	+10.5%
2011	4,661	+12.4%
2021	4,946	+6.1%
2026	5,365	+8.5%

== Politics ==
The municipal council (Gemeinderat) consists of 29 members. Since the 2025 Lower Austrian local elections, it is made up of the following parties and lists:

- List Future Leobersdorf (LZL): 11 seats
- Citizen List Leobersdorf Now (JETZT): 11 seats
- Social Democratic Party of Austria (SPÖ): 3 seats
- Freedom Party of Austria (FPÖ): 3 seats
- Austrian People's Party (ÖVP): 1 seat

== Notable people ==
Ing. Viktor Kaplan worked at the Leobersdorfer Maschinenfabrik from 1901 to 1903 and developed his idea of the Kaplan turbine there.
