= Andreas Chasikos =

Cypriot sport shooter (born 1984)

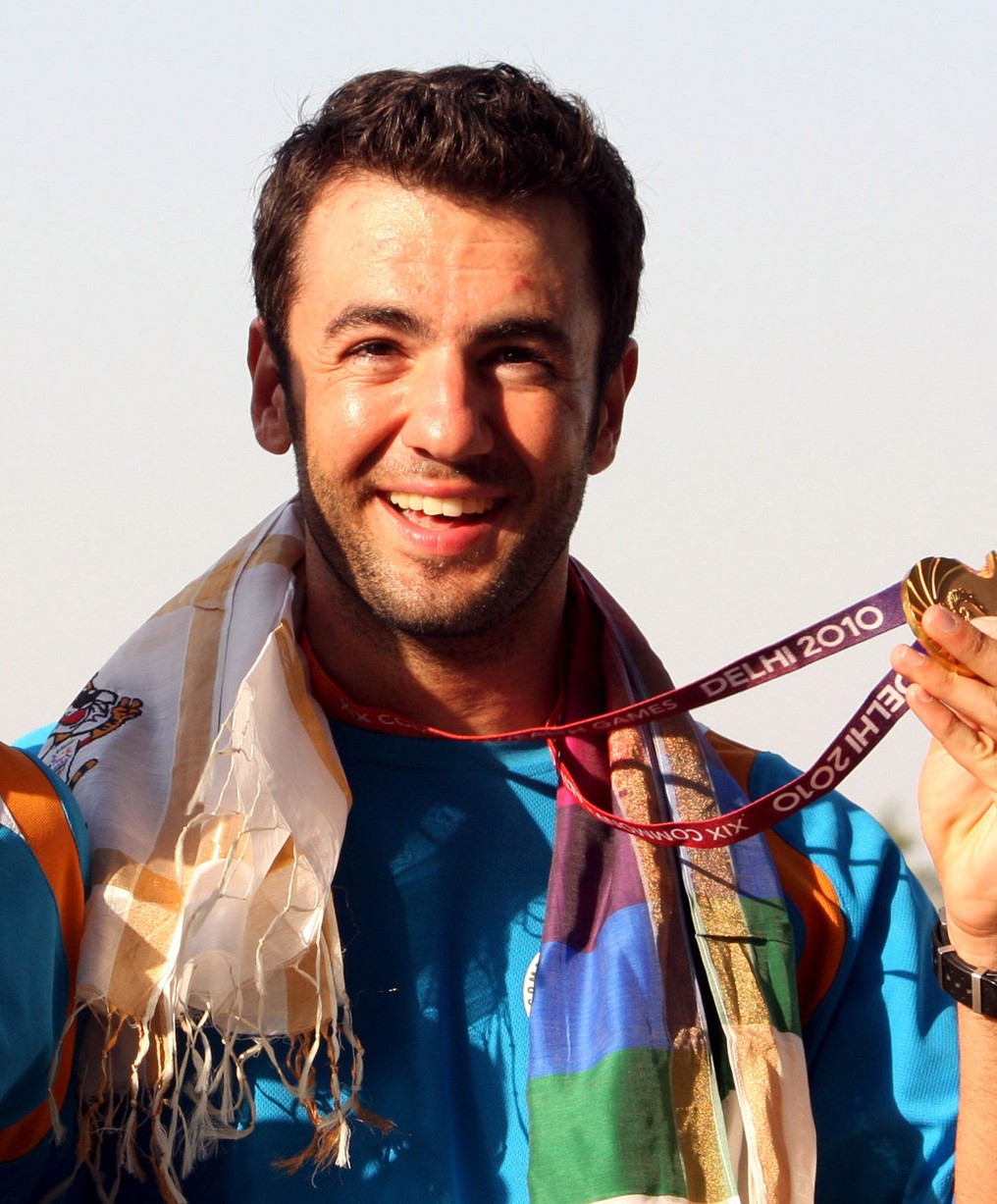
- Chasikos at 2010 Commonwealth Games

Personal information
- Born: June 7, 1984 (age 42) Larnaca, Cyprus
Medal record
Men's Shooting
Representing Cyprus
European Games
Silver medal – second place	2023 Kraków-Małopolska	Skeet mixed team
Commonwealth Games
Gold medal – first place	2010 New Delhi	Skeet pairs
Games of the Small States of Europe
Gold medal – first place	2017 San Marino	Skeet
Summer Universiade
Gold medal – first place	2007 Bangkok	Skeet
Silver medal – second place	2007 Bangkok	Skeet team
Bronze medal – third place	2011 Shenzhen	Skeet team

Andreas Chasikos (Greek: Ανδρέας Χασικός; born June 7, 1984) is a Cypriot sport shooter. He along with Georgios Achilleos won the gold medal in pairs skeet shooting at the 2010 Commonwealth Games.
