= Sandra Bernal =

Polish sports shooter (born 1999)

Personal information
- Nationality: Polish
- Born: 9 July 1999 (age 26) Wrocław, Poland

Sport
- Sport: Sports shooting

Sandra Bernal (born 9 July 1999) is a Polish sports shooter. She competed in the women's trap event at the 2020 Summer Olympics.
