= Éric Delaunay =

French sports shooter (born 1987)

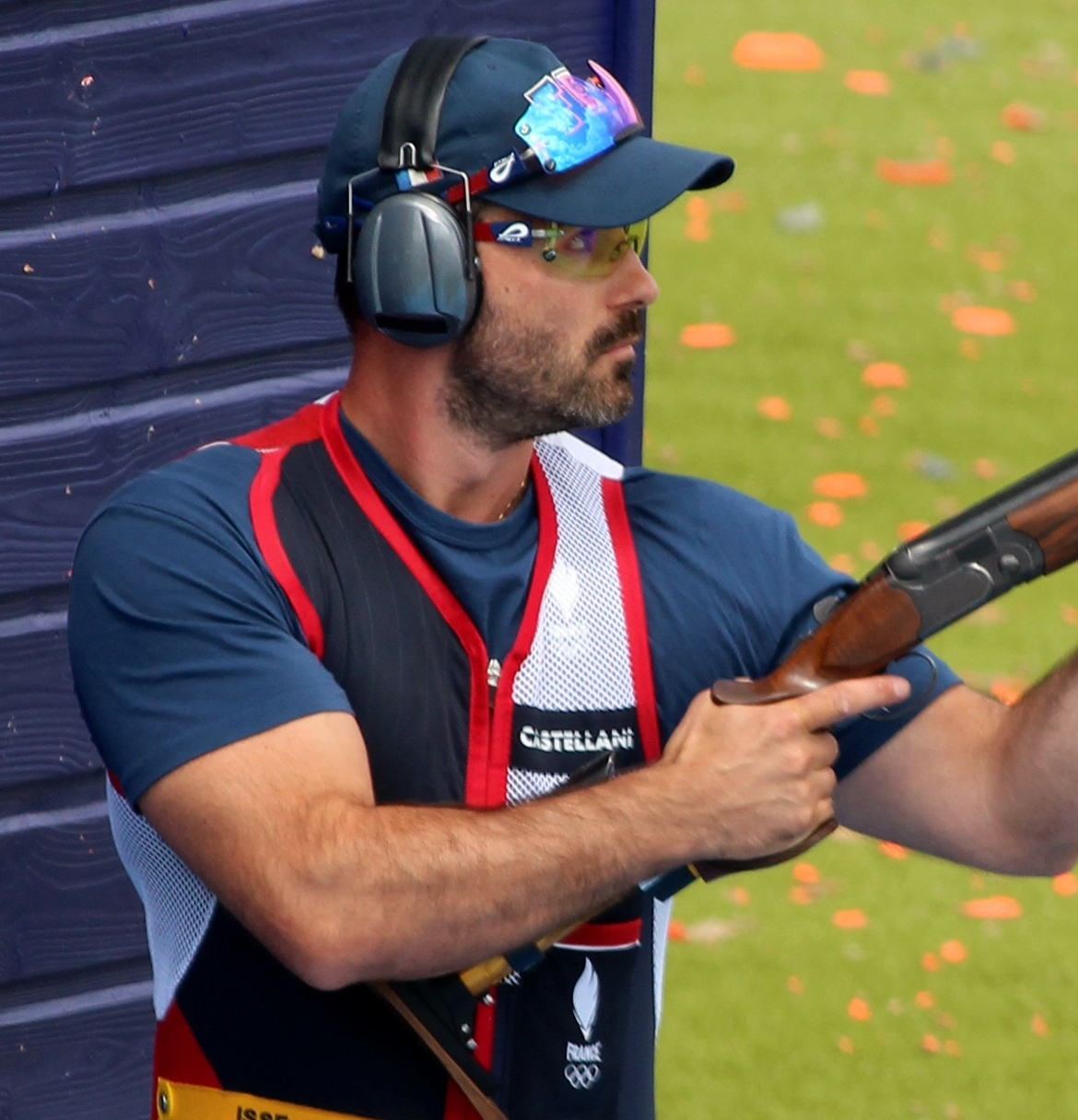
- Delaunay at the 2024 Summer Olympics

Personal information
- Born: 4 December 1987 (age 38) Saint-Lô, France
- Height: 1.80 m (5 ft 11 in)
- Weight: 85 kg (187 lb)

Sport
- Country: France
- Sport: Sports shooting
- Event: Skeet
- Club: BTC Breville
Medal record
World Championships
Gold medal – first place	2018 Changwon	Team skeet
European Championships
Gold medal – first place	2024 Lonato	Mixed team skeet
Silver medal – second place	2025 Chateauroux	Skeet team

Éric Delaunay (born 4 December 1987) is a French sports shooter. He represented France in the men's skeet event at the 2016 Summer Olympics, the 2020 Summer Olympics, and the 2024 Summer Olympics.

Delaunay was born in 1987 in Saint-Lô. His parents owned a shooting range and gun shop, giving him early exposure to shooting sports; he began shooting at ten years old. He is a member of the Ball-Trap Club de Breville-sur-Mer, and was coached by Sandro Bellini. He also studied at the INSEP in Paris.
