= Nikolaos Mavrommatis =

Greek sport shooter (born 1980)

Personal information
- Born: July 19, 1980 (age 45) Cholargos, Athens, Greece

Sport
- Country: Greece
- Sport: Shooting
Medal record
Men's shooting
Representing Greece
World Championships
Silver medal – second place	2023 Baku	Team skeet
European Games
Bronze medal – third place	2023 Kraków-Małopolska	Team skeet

Nikolaos Mavrommatis (born 19 July 1980) is a Greek sport shooter. At the 2012 Summer Olympics he competed in the Men's skeet, finishing in 9th place.

He earned a quota place for the 2020 Summer Olympics with a bronze-medal performance at the 2019 European Shotgun Championship.
