= Jakub Tomeček =

Czech sport shooter (born 1991)

Personal information
- Nationality: Czech Republic
- Born: 23 May 1991 (age 35) Kyjov, Czechoslovakia

Sport
- Sport: Shooting
- Event: Skeet
- Club: SKP Kometa Brno
Medal record
Men's shooting
Representing Czech Republic
World Championships
Gold medal – first place	2026 Doha	Team skeet
Silver medal – second place	2013 Lima	Team skeet
Bronze medal – third place	2022 Osijek	Team skeet
European Games
Bronze medal – third place	2019 Minsk	Mixed team skeet
European Championships
Gold medal – first place	2018 Leobersdorf	Team skeet
Gold medal – first place	2019 Lonato del Garda	Skeet
Gold medal – first place	2022 Larnaca	Skeet
Gold medal – first place	2019 Lonato del Garda	Team skeet
Silver medal – second place	2021 Osijek	Mixed team skeet
Silver medal – second place	2023 Osijek	Team skeet
Bronze medal – third place	2011 Belgrade	Skeet
Bronze medal – third place	2012 Larnaca	Team skeet
Bronze medal – third place	2022 Larnaca	Mixed team skeet
Bronze medal – third place	2024 Lonato	Mixed team skeet

Jakub Tomeček (Czech pronunciation: [ˈjakup ˈtomɛtʃɛk]; born 23 May 1991) is a Czech sport shooter. At the 2012 Summer Olympics he competed in the Men's skeet, finishing in 19th place.
