= Shooting at the 2015 European Games – Women's skeet =

Women's skeet at the 2015 European Games
- Venue: Baku Shooting Centre
- Date: 20 June
- Competitors: 19 from 14 nations

Medalists
gold medal	Amber Hill	Great Britain
silver medal	Diana Bacosi	Italy
bronze medal	Chiara Cainero	Italy

The Women's skeet competition at the 2015 European Games in Baku, Azerbaijan was held on 16 June at the Baku Shooting Centre.

== Schedule ==
All times are local (UTC+5).

Date	Time	Event
Saturday, 20 June 2015	9:35	Qualification
Saturday, 20 June 2015	15:30	Final

== Results ==
=== Qualification ===
Rank	Athlete	Series			Total	Note
Rank	Athlete	1	2	3	Total	Note
1	Diana Bacosi (ITA)	25	25	25	75	GR
2	Amber Hill (GBR)	24	24	25	73	
3	Chiara Cainero (ITA)	24	24	24	72	
4	Danka Barteková (SVK)	25	23	24	72	
5	Christine Wenzel (GER)	22	24	25	71	+2
6	Andri Eleftheriou (CYP)	24	23	24	71	+2
7	Aleksandra Jarmolinska (POL)	24	23	24	71	+1
8	Nataliya Panas (GEO)	25	24	22	71	+1
9	Marjut Heinonen (FIN)	24	22	23	69	
10	Viktoriia Cherviakova (UKR)	25	22	22	69	
11	Albina Shakirova (RUS)	23	21	24	68	
12	Lucie Anastassiou (FRA)	22	23	23	68	
13	Panagiota Andreou (CYP)	22	21	24	67	
14	Elena Allen (GBR)	24	20	23	67	
15	Therese Lundqvist (SWE)	23	23	20	66	Cb:55
16	Libuše Jahodová (CZE)	23	23	20	66	Cb:52
17	Anastasia Krakhmaleva (RUS)	20	23	22	65	
18	Nurlana Jafarova (AZE)	23	21	21	65	
19	Andrea Stranovska (SVK)	23	20	21	64	

=== Semifinal ===
Rank	Athlete	Score	S-off
1	Diana Bacosi (ITA)	16	
2	Amber Hill (GBR)	16	
3	Danka Barteková (SVK)	14	
4	Chiara Cainero (ITA)	14	
5	Christine Wenzel (GER)	12	
6	Andri Eleftheriou (CYP)	12	

=== Finals ===
==== Bronze medal match ====
Rank	Athlete	Score	S-off
3rd place, bronze medalist(s)	Chiara Cainero (ITA)	16	
4	Danka Barteková (SVK)	15	

==== Gold medal match ====
Rank	Athlete	Score	S-off
1st place, gold medalist(s)	Amber Hill (GBR)	15	30
2nd place, silver medalist(s)	Diana Bacosi (ITA)	15	29
