= Shooting at the 2019 European Games – Women's skeet =

Women's skeet at the 2019 European Games
- Venue: Sporting Club
- Dates: 26–27 June
- Competitors: 28 from 19 nations

Medalists
gold medal	Diana Bacosi	Italy
silver medal	Lucie Anastassiou	France
bronze medal	Chiara Cainero	Italy

The women's skeet event at the 2019 European Games in Minsk, Belarus took place from 26 to 27 June at the Sporting Club.

== Schedule ==
All times are FET (UTC+03:00)

Date	Time	Event
Wednesday, 26 June 2019	09:00	Qualification day 1
Thursday, 27 June 2019	09:00	Qualification day 2
Thursday, 27 June 2019	16:45	Final

== Records ==
Prior to this competition, the existing world, European and Games records were as follows.

Qualification
World Record	Samantha Simonton (USA); Zhang Heng (CHN)	123	Acapulco, Mexico	24 March 2019
European Record	Diana Bacosi (ITA)	123	Changwon, South Korea	10 May 2019
Games Record	—	—	—	—
Final
World Record	Kimberly Rhode (USA)	58	Changwon, South Korea	28 April 2018
European Record	Diana Bacosi (ITA)	56	New Delhi, India	25 October 2017
Games Record	—	—	—	—

== Results ==
=== Qualification ===
The qualification round took place on 26 and 27 June to determine the qualifiers for the finals.

Rank	Athlete	Country	Day 1	Day 2	Total	S-off	Notes
1	Diana Bacosi	Italy	74	46	120		Q, GR
2	Lucie Anastassiou	France	69	47	116	+8	Q
3	Panayiota Andreou	Cyprus	69	47	116	+7	Q
4	Albina Shakirova	Russia	70	46	116	+1	Q
5	Marjut Heinonen	Finland	67	48	115	+10	Q
6	Chiara Cainero	Italy	69	46	115	+9	Q
7	Andri Eleftheriou	Cyprus	68	47	115	+1	
8	Veronika Sýkorová	Slovakia	68	46	114		
9	Danka Barteková	Slovakia	65	47	112		
10	Aleksandra Jarmolińska	Poland	65	47	112		
11	Amber Hill	Great Britain	65	47	112		
12	Barbara Šumová	Czech Republic	66	45	111		
13	Martina Skalická	Czech Republic	67	44	111		
14	Nurlana Jafarova	Azerbaijan	66	44	110		
15	Esmee van der Veen	Netherlands	66	44	110		
16	Bianka Pongrátz	Hungary	67	42	109		
17	Nur Banu Özpak	Turkey	68	41	109		
18	Katrin Wieslhuber	Germany	63	45	108		
19	Victoria Larsson	Sweden	67	41	108		
20	Roxana Sofia Mikloş	Romania	67	40	107		
21	Iryna Malovichko	Ukraine	67	40	107		
22	Vanessa Hauff	Germany	64	42	106		
23	Rigina Meftakhetdinova	Azerbaijan	60	44	104		
24	Alisa Bogdanova	Lithuania	61	43	104		
25	Malin Farsjø	Norway	65	38	103		
26	Elena Allen	Great Britain	65	38	103		
27	Noémie Battault	France	60	43	103		
28	Natalia Szamrej	Poland	65	42	102		

=== Final ===
The final round took place on 27 June to determine the final classification.

Rank	Athlete	Series						S-off	Notes
Rank	Athlete	1	2	3	4	5	6	S-off	Notes
1st place, gold medalist(s)	Diana Bacosi (ITA)	9	17	26	33	43	53	+4	GR
2nd place, silver medalist(s)	Lucie Anastassiou (FRA)	8	17	25	35	45	53	+3	GR
3rd place, bronze medalist(s)	Chiara Cainero (ITA)	10	17	26	34	42			
4	Albina Shakirova (RUS)	8	17	24	33				
5	Panayiota Andreou (CYP)	8	15	22					
6	Marjut Heinonen (FIN)	7	14						
