= Shooting at the 2015 Pan American Games – Women's skeet =

Shooting – Women's skeet at the 2015 Pan American Games
- Venue: Pan Am Shooting Centre
- Dates: July 18
- Competitors: 9 from 8 nations

Medalists
Gold medal	Kim Rhode	United States
Silver medal	Melisa Gil	Argentina
Bronze medal	Francisca Crovetto	Chile

The women's skeet shooting event at the 2015 Pan American Games was held on July 18 at Pan Am Shooting Centre in Innisfil. The defending Pan American Games champion is Kim Rhode of the United States.

The event consisted of three rounds: a qualifier, a semifinal and a medal round. In the qualifier, each shooter fired 3 sets of 25 shots in the set order of skeet shooting.

The top 6 shooters in the qualifying round moved on to the semifinal. There, they fired a round of 16 shoots. The top 2 qualified to dispute the golden medal, while the third and fourth place qualified to dispute the bronze medal.

The winners of all fifteen events, along with the runner up in the men's air rifle, skeet, trap and both women's rifle events will qualify for the 2016 Summer Olympics in Rio de Janeiro, Brazil (granted the athlete has not yet earned a quota for their country).

== Schedule ==
Date	Time	Round
July 18, 2015	9:00	Qualification
July 18, 2015	14:30	Semifinal
July 18, 2015	14:45	Finals

== Records ==
The existing world and Pan American Games records were as follows.

Qualification records
World record	Diana Bacosi (ITA)	75	Baku, Azerbaijan	June 26, 2015
Pan American record	Kim Rhode (USA)	73	Guadalajara, Mexico	October 21, 2011

== Results ==
=== Qualification round ===
Rank	Athlete	Country	1	2	3	Total	Notes
1	Kim Rhode	United States	25	24	25	74	Q, PR
2	Melisa Gil	Argentina	23	24	25	72	Q
3	Andrea Romero	Guatemala	22	21	23	66	Q
4	Francisca Crovetto	Chile	22	21	20	63	Q
5	Anabel Molina	Mexico	23	21	18	62	Q
6	Daniella Borda	Peru	20	17	22	59	Q
7	Daniela Carraro	Brazil	19	18	21	58	
8	Gabriela Rodriguez	Mexico	15	19	18	52	
9	Michelle Elliot	Barbados	15	16	17	48	

=== Semifinal ===
Rank	Athlete	Country	Score	S-off	Notes
1	Kim Rhode	United States	16		QG
2	Melisa Gil	Argentina	14		QG
3	Daniella Borda	Peru	13		QB
4	Francisca Crovetto	Chile	12		QB
5	Andrea Romero	Guatemala	11		
6	Anabel Molina	Mexico	9		

=== Finals ===
==== Bronze-medal match ====
Rank	Athlete	Country	Score	S-off	Notes
3rd place, bronze medalist(s)	Francisca Crovetto	Chile	15		
4	Daniella Borda	Peru	12		

==== Gold-medal match ====
Rank	Athlete	Country	Score	S-off	Notes
1st place, gold medalist(s)	Kim Rhode	United States	15		
2nd place, silver medalist(s)	Melisa Gil	Argentina	12		
