= Shooting at the 2023 European Games – Women's skeet =

Women's skeet at the 2023 European Games
- Venue: Wrocław Shooting Centre
- Dates: 24–25 June
- Competitors: 28 from 18 nations

Medalists
gold medal	Martina Bartolomei	Italy
silver medal	Emmanouela Katzouraki	Greece
bronze medal	Nadine Messerschmidt	Germany

The women's skeet event at the 2023 European Games took place on 24 and 25 June at the Wrocław Shooting Centre.

== Records ==
Prior to this competition, the existing world, European and Games records were as follows.

Qualification
World Record	Francisca Crovetto (CHI)	125	Lonato del Garda, Italy	27 April 2022
European Record	Danka Barteková (SVK)	125	Doha, Qatar	7 March 2023
Games Record	Diana Bacosi (ITA)	120	Minsk, Belarus	27 June 2019

== Results ==
=== Qualification ===
Rank	Athlete	Country	Day 1			Day 2		Total	Notes
Rank	Athlete	Country	1	2	3	4	5	Total	Notes
1	Amber Rutter	Great Britain	25	25	23	25	25	123	Q, GR
2	Marjut Heinonen	Finland	25	23	25	24	25	122	Q
3	Victoria Larsson	Sweden	25	25	25	24	22	121+5	Q
4	Emmanouela Katzouraki	Greece	24	24	24	25	24	121+4	Q
5	Martina Bartolomei	Italy	23	25	24	24	25	121+3	Q
6	Lucie Anastassiou	France	24	24	23	24	25	120+6	Q
7	Nadine Messerschmidt	Germany	24	24	25	24	23	120+5	Q
8	Nele Wissmer	Germany	24	24	24	24	24	120+3	Q
9	Danka Barteková	Slovakia	23	25	24	22	25	119	
10	Vanesa Hocková	Slovakia	22	23	25	23	25	118	
11	Iryna Malovichko	Ukraine	24	24	23	23	24	118	
12	Martina Skalická	Czech Republic	23	22	23	25	24	117	
13	Viktoriia Naumenko	Ukraine	21	25	23	23	24	116	
14	Emily Hibbs	Great Britain	22	24	21	23	25	115	
15	Noémie Battault	France	25	22	23	21	24	115	
16	Anastasia Eleftheriou	Cyprus	23	23	23	23	23	115	
17	Nur Banu Balkancı	Turkey	24	22	23	24	22	115	
18	Rigina Meftakhetdinova	Azerbaijan	22	25	23	24	21	115	
19	Anda Lita Vāvere	Latvia	23	22	22	23	24	114	
20	Simona Scocchetti	Italy	20	23	25	24	22	114	
21	Bianka Pongrátz	Hungary	20	24	21	24	24	113	
22	Barbora Šumová	Czech Republic	21	24	21	24	23	113	
23	Yerjanik Avetisyan	Armenia	25	22	18	25	22	112	
24	Esmee van der Veen	Netherlands	23	23	23	23	20	112	
25	Konstantia Nikolaou	Cyprus	22	24	21	24	19	110	
26	Nurlana Jafarova	Azerbaijan	22	21	24	23	19	109	
27	Sena Can	Turkey	19	19	22	21	20	101	
28	Natalia Szamrej	Poland	20	22	19	20	20	101	

=== Ranking matches ===
Rank	Athlete	Series			Total	Notes
Rank	Athlete	1	2	3	Total	Notes
1	Nadine Messerschmidt (GER)	10	10	10	30	Q
2	Martina Bartolomei (ITA)	10	9	9	28	Q
3	Victoria Larsson (SWE)	9	9	9	27	
4	Amber Rutter (GBR)	7	9		16	

Rank	Athlete	Series			Total	Notes
Rank	Athlete	1	2	3	Total	Notes
1	Emmanouela Katzouraki (GRE)	9	9	9	27	Q
2	Marjut Heinonen (FIN)	8	8	10	26+12	Q
3	Lucie Anastassiou (FRA)	9	8	9	26+11	
4	Nele Wissmer (GER)	8	8		16	

=== Medal match ===
Rank	Athlete	Series				Total
Rank	Athlete	1	2	3	4	Total
1st place, gold medalist(s)	Martina Bartolomei (ITA)	9	10	8	10	37
2nd place, silver medalist(s)	Emmanouela Katzouraki (GRE)	10	10	7	8	35
3rd place, bronze medalist(s)	Nadine Messerschmidt (GER)	9	9	7		25
4	Marjut Heinonen (FIN)	9	8			17
