= Shooting at the 2015 European Games – Mixed Skeet =

Mixed Skeet at the 2015 European Games
- Venue: Baku Shooting Centre
- Date: June 22, 2015
- Competitors: 22 from 11 nations

Medalists
gold medal	Valerio Luchini; Diana Bacosi	Italy
silver medal	Georgios Achilleos; Andri Eleftheriou	Cyprus
bronze medal	Anthony Terras; Lucie Anastassiou	France

The Mixed Skeet shooting competition at the 2015 European Games in Baku, Azerbaijan was held on 22 June at the Baku Shooting Centre.

== Schedule ==
All times are local (UTC+5).

Date	Time	Event
Monday, 22 June 2015	9:30	Qualification
Monday, 22 June 2015	18:15	Final

== Results ==
Rank	Team	Series		Total	Notes
Rank	Team	1	2	Total	Notes
1	Cyprus (CYP)	49	48	97	
	Andri Eleftheriou	24	24	48	
	Georgios Achilleos	25	24	49	
2	Italy (ITA)	48	45	93	+2
	Diana Bacosi	24	23	47	
	Valerio Luchini	24	22	46	
3	Germany (GER)	46	47	93	+1
	Christine Wenzel	22	24	46	
	Ralf Buchheim	24	23	47	
4	Slovakia (SVK)	45	46	91	+4
	Danka Barteková	23	23	46	
	Štefan Zemko	22	23	45	
5	France (FRA)	45	46	91	+3
	Lucie Anastassiou	20	21	41	
	Anthony Terras	25	25	50	
6	Czech Republic (CZE)	47	43	90	+2
	Libuše Jahodová	22	19	41	
	Jan Sychra	25	24	49	
7	Russia (RUS)	45	45	90	+1
	Anastasia Krakhmaleva	21	22	43	
	Valeriy Shomin	24	23	47	
8	Ukraine (UKR)	47	42	89	
	Viktoriia Cherviakova	23	19	42	
	Mikola Milchev	24	23	47	
9	Sweden (SWE)	41	47	88	
	Therese Lundqvist	20	23	43	
	Stefan Nilsson	21	24	45	
10	Finland (FIN)	44	44	88	
	Marjut Heinonen	20	21	41	
	Tommi Takanen	24	23	47	
11	Azerbaijan (AZE)	42	45	87	
	Nurlana Jafarova	20	23	43	
	Emin Jafarov	22	22	44	

=== Semi-final 1 ===
Rank	Team	Total
1	Cyprus (CYP)	26
	Andri Eleftheriou	13
	Georgios Achilleos	13
2	Slovakia (SVK)	25
	Danka Barteková	13
	Štefan Zemko	12
3	Germany (GER)	17
	Christine Wenzel	8
	Ralf Buchheim	9

=== Semi-final 2 ===
Rank	Team	Total
1	Italy (ITA)	29
	Diana Bacosi	14
	Valerio Luchini	15
2	France (FRA)	24
	Lucie Anastassiou	10
	Anthony Terras	14
3	Czech Republic (CZE)	16
	Libuše Jahodová	8
	Jan Sychra	8

=== Finals ===
==== Bronze medal match ====
Rank	Team	Total
3rd place, bronze medalist(s)	France (FRA)	28
	Lucie Anastassiou	13
	Anthony Terras	15
4	Slovakia (SVK)	24
	Danka Barteková	11
	Štefan Zemko	14

==== Gold medal match ====
Rank	Team	Total
1st place, gold medalist(s)	Italy (ITA)	30
	Diana Bacosi	14
	Valerio Luchini	16
2nd place, silver medalist(s)	Cyprus (CYP)	29
	Andri Eleftheriou	15
	Georgios Achilleos	14
