= Shooting at the 2020 Summer Olympics – Women's skeet =

Olympic shooting event

Women's skeet at the Games of the XXXII Olympiad
- Olympic shooting pictogram
- Venue: Asaka Shooting Range
- Dates: 25–26 July 2021
- Competitors: 28 from 22 nations
- Winning score: 56

Medalists
1st place, gold medalist(s)		Amber English	United States
2nd place, silver medalist(s)		Diana Bacosi	Italy
3rd place, bronze medalist(s)		Wei Meng	China

The Women's skeet event at the 2020 Summer Olympics took place on 25 and 26 July 2021 at the Asaka Shooting Range.

== Records ==
Prior to this competition, the existing world and Olympic records were as follows.

Qualification records
World record	Wei Meng (CHN)	124	Doha, Qatar	10 November 2019
Olympic record	Not established	–	–	–

Final records
World record	Wei Meng (CHN)	59	Al Ain, United Arab Emirates	12 October 2019
Olympic record	Not established	–	–	–

During the competition, Wei Meng established a new Olympic record (124) in qualification, and Amber English in the finals (56).

== Schedule ==
All times are Japan Standard Time (UTC+9)

Date	Time	Round
Sunday, 25 July 2021; Monday, 26 July 2021	9:00; 9:00	Qualification
Monday, 26 July 2021	14:50	Final

== Results ==
=== Qualification ===
Rank	Athlete	Country	1	2	3	4	5	Total	Notes
1	Wei Meng	China	25	25	25	24	25	124	Q, =WR, OR
2	Diana Bacosi	Italy	25	25	25	24	24	123	Q
3	Amber English	United States	23	25	24	24	25	121	Q
4	Isarapa Imprasertsuk	Thailand	23	24	25	24	24	120+6	Q
5	Nadine Messerschmidt	Germany	24	24	24	24	24	120+5	Q
6	Natalia Vinogradova	ROC	25	25	23	23	24	120+1	Q
7	Andri Eleftheriou	Cyprus	24	24	23	23	25	119	
8	Iryna Malovichko	Ukraine	24	24	23	25	23	119	
9	Lucie Anastassiou	France	24	23	25	24	23	119	
10	Austen Smith	United States	23	25	25	23	23	119	
11	Sutiya Jiewchaloemmit	Thailand	23	23	24	23	25	118	
12	Gabriela Rodríguez	Mexico	23	23	24	24	24	118	
13	Danka Barteková	Slovakia	24	22	25	24	23	118	
14	Barbora Šumová	Czech Republic	24	24	23	24	23	118	
15	Zilia Batyrshina	ROC	22	23	23	25	24	117	
16	Ibtissam Marirhi	Morocco	22	23	24	25	23	117	
17	Zhang Donglian	China	23	24	23	24	22	116	
18	Melisa Gil	Argentina	23	24	23	22	23	115	
19	Aleksandra Jarmolińska	Poland	22	23	24	21	24	114	
20	Chiara Cainero	Italy	22	22	23	24	23	114	
21	Naoko Ishihara	Japan	24	21	23	23	23	114	
22	Zoya Kravchenko	Kazakhstan	24	22	22	24	21	113	
23	Francisca Crovetto	Chile	24	21	21	22	24	112	
24	Maryam Hassani	Bahrain	22	22	22	23	23	112	
25	Laura Coles	Australia	24	22	22	24	20	112	
26	Assem Orynbay	Kazakhstan	23	22	24	19	23	111	
27	Chloe Tipple	New Zealand	22	18	22	23	23	108	
28	Chiara Costa	Senegal	25	20	22	23	18	108	
	Amber Hill	Great Britain	Did not start						

=== Final ===
Rank	Athlete	Series						Notes
Rank	Athlete	1	2	3	4	5	6	Notes
1st place, gold medalist(s)	Amber English (USA)	10	19	28	38	47	56	OR
2nd place, silver medalist(s)	Diana Bacosi (ITA)	10	19	29	38	47	55	
3rd place, bronze medalist(s)	Wei Meng (CHN)	9	17	27	36	46		
4	Isarapa Imprasertsuk (THA)	9	18	27	36			
5	Nadine Messerschmidt (GER)	9	17	26				
6	Natalia Vinogradova (ROC)	8	17					
