= Shooting at the 2011 Pan American Games – Women's skeet =

Shooting – Women's skeet at the 2011 Pan American Games
- Venue: Pan American Shooting Polygon
- Dates: October 21
- Competitors: 5 from 5 nations

Medalists
Gold medal	Kim Rhode	United States
Silver medal	Francisca Crovetto	Chile
Bronze medal	Melisa Gil	Argentina

The women's skeet shooting event at the 2011 Pan American Games was on October 21 at the Jalisco Hunting Club in Guadalajara. The defending Pan American Games champion is Haley Dunn of the United States.

The event consisted of two rounds: a qualifier and a final. In the qualifier, each shooter fired 3 sets of 25 shots in the set order of skeet shooting.

The top 6 shooters in the qualifying round moved on to the final round. There, they fired one additional round of 25. The total score from all 100 shots was used to determine final ranking. Ties are broken using a shoot-off; additional shots are fired one at a time until there is no longer a tie.

== Schedule ==
All times are Central Standard Time (UTC-6).

Date	Time	Round
October 21, 2011	10:00	Qualification
October 21, 2011	14:00	Final

== Records ==
The existing world and Pan American Games records were as follows.

Qualification records
World record	Elena Little (GBR); Shi Hong Yan (CHN); Christine Brinker (GER); Zemfira Meftahatdinova (AZE); Erdzhanik Avetisyan (RUS); Christine Brinker (GER); Danka Barteková (SVK); Sutiya Jiewchaloemmit (THA); Wei Ning (CHN)	74	Belgrade, Serbia; Qingyuan, China; Qingyuan, China; Cairo, Egypt; Lonato, Italy; Nicosia, Cyprus; Nicosia, Cyprus; Cairo, Egypt; Munich, Germany	July 17, 2005; April 9, 2006; April 9, 2006; May 18, 2006; June 13, 2007; July 9, 2008; July 9, 2008; May 8, 2009; May 19, 2009
Pan American record	Haley Dunn (USA)	70	Rio de Janeiro, Brazil	July 19, 2007

Final records
World record	Danka Barteková (SVK)	99 (74+25)	Nicosia, Cyprus	July 9, 2008
Pan American record	Haley Dunn (USA)	94 (70+24)	Rio de Janeiro, Brazil	July 19, 2007

== Results ==
5 athletes from 5 countries competed. Due to the low number of participants, all athletes advanced to the final.

=== Qualification ===
Rank	Athlete	Country	1	2	3	Shoot-off	Total	Notes
1	Kim Rhode	United States	25	24	24		73	Q PR
2	Francisca Crovetto	Chile	22	22	23		67	Q
3	Melisa Gil	Argentina	23	20	22		65	Q
4	Anabel Molina	Mexico	21	21	18		60	Q
5	Andrea Romero	Guatemala	22	17	20		59	Q

=== Final ===
Rank	Athlete	Qual	Final	Total	Notes
1st place, gold medalist(s)	Kim Rhode (USA)	73	25	98	FPR
2nd place, silver medalist(s)	Francisca Crovetto (CHI)	67	22	89	
3rd place, bronze medalist(s)	Melisa Gil (ARG)	65	23	88	
4	Anabel Molina (MEX)	60	21	81	
5	Andrea Romero (GUA)	59	21	80	
