= Shooting at the 2016 Summer Olympics – Women's skeet =

Women's skeet at the Games of the XXXI Olympiad
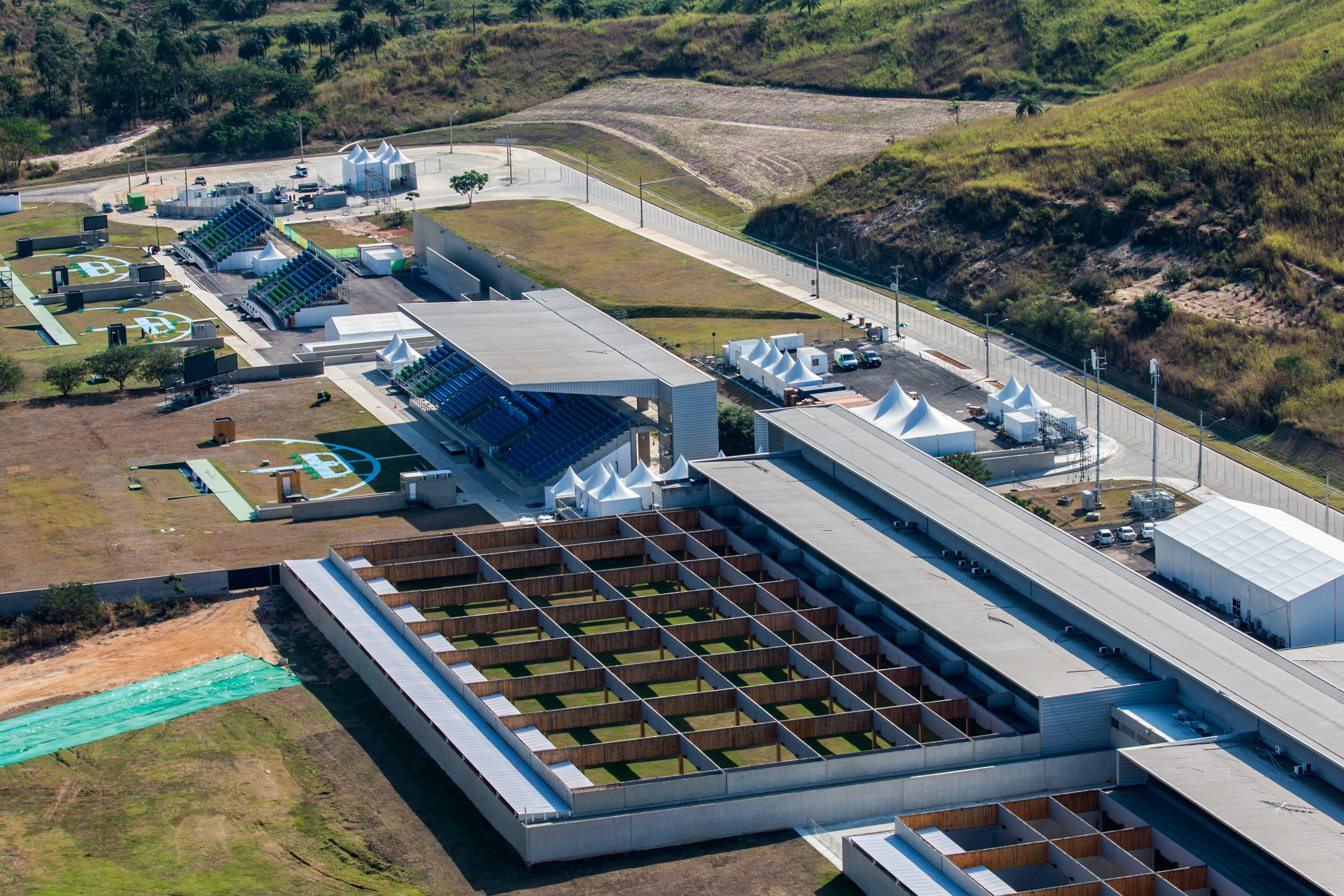
- Aerial view of the National Shooting Center in Deodoro, where the women's skeet event took place.
- Venue: National Shooting Center
- Date: 12 August 2016
- Competitors: 21 from 17 nations
- Winning score: 15/16 (in the gold medal match)

Medalists
1st place, gold medalist(s)		Diana Bacosi	Italy
2nd place, silver medalist(s)		Chiara Cainero	Italy
3rd place, bronze medalist(s)		Kim Rhode	United States

The Women's skeet event at the 2016 Olympic Games took place on 12 August 2016 at the National Shooting Center.

== Competition format ==
The event consisted of three rounds: a qualifier, semifinal and a final. In the qualifier, each shooter fired 3 sets of 25 shots in the set order of skeet shooting.

The top 6 shooters in the qualifying round moved on to the semifinal round. There, they fired one additional round of 16. Ties are broken using a shoot-off; additional shots are fired one at a time until there is no longer a tie.

== Records ==
Prior to this competition, the existing world and Olympic records were as follows.

Qualification records
World record	Diana Bacosi (ITA); Aleksandra Jarmolińska (POL); Chiara Cainero (ITA)	75	Baku, Azerbaijan; Gabala, Azerbaijan; Lonato, Italy	20 June 2015; 8 August 2015; 9 July 2016
Olympic record	ISSF Rule changed on 1 January 2013	—	—	—

== Results ==
=== Qualification round ===
Rank	Athlete	Country	1	2	3	Tie break	Total	Notes
1	Wei Meng	China	23	25	25		73	Q, OR
2	Kim Rhode	United States	23	25	24		72	Q
3	Diana Bacosi	Italy	25	23	24		72	Q
4	Chiara Cainero	Italy	24	22	24		70	Q
5	Amber Hill	Great Britain	23	24	23		70	Q
6	Morgan Craft	United States	24	24	21	+2	69	Q
7	Albina Shakirova	Russia	21	23	25	+1	69	
8	Melisa Gil	Argentina	23	21	25	+1	69	
9	Wei Ning	China	24	20	24		68	
10	Sutiya Jiewchaloemmit	Thailand	23	22	23		68	
11	Christine Wenzel	Germany	22	24	22		68	
12	Aleksandra Jarmolińska	Poland	23	23	22		68	
13	Chloe Tipple	New Zealand	21	23	23		67	
14	Elena Allen	Great Britain	23	18	23		64	
15	Andri Eleftheriou	Cyprus	21	21	22		64	
16	Danka Barteková	Slovakia	22	20	22		64	
17	Aislin Jones	Australia	21	20	22		63	
18	Naoko Ishihara	Japan	18	20	24		62	
19	Francisca Crovetto	Chile	21	22	19		62	
20	Libuše Jahodová	Czech Republic	18	19	21		58	
21	Daniela Carraro	Brazil	19	19	20		58	

=== Semifinal ===
Rank	Athlete	Country	Total	Tie break	Notes
1	Chiara Cainero	Italy	16		Gold Medal Match
2	Diana Bacosi	Italy	15		Gold Medal Match
3	Wei Meng	China	14	+4	Bronze Medal Match
4	Kim Rhode	United States	14	+4	Bronze Medal Match
5	Morgan Craft	United States	14	+3	
6	Amber Hill	Great Britain	13		

=== Final (medal matches) ===
Rank	Athlete	Country	Total	Tie break	Notes
1st place, gold medalist(s)	Diana Bacosi	Italy	15		
2nd place, silver medalist(s)	Chiara Cainero	Italy	14		
3rd place, bronze medalist(s)	Kim Rhode	United States	15	+7	
4	Wei Meng	China	15	+6	
