= Shooting at the 2010 South American Games – Women's trap =

The Women's trap event at the 2010 South American Games was held on March 22 at 9:00.

== Medalists ==
Gold	Silver	Bronze
Anne-Marie Pietersz; Netherlands Antilles	Janice Teixeira; Brazil	Pamela Boghikian; Chile

== Results ==
=== Qualification ===
Rank	Athlete	Series			Total	Shoot-off
Rank	Athlete	1	2	3	Total	Shoot-off
1	Janice Teixeira (BRA)	18	24	19	61	
2	Anne-Marie Pietersz (AHO)	22	20	17	59	
3	Pamela Boghikian (CHI)	17	18	18	53	
4	Gina Baez (COL)	14	18	20	52	
5	Melisa Gil (ARG)	14	19	17	50	
6	Nicole Andrea Torres (CHI)	17	19	14	50	
7	Monica Falla Osorio (COL)	13	18	16	47	

==== Final ====
Rank	Athlete	Qual Score	Final Score	Total	Shoot-off
1st place, gold medalist(s)	Anne-Marie Pietersz (AHO)	59	18	77	
2nd place, silver medalist(s)	Janice Teixeira (BRA)	61	9	70	
3rd place, bronze medalist(s)	Pamela Boghikian (CHI)	53	15	68	
4	Gina Baez (COL)	52	11	63	
5	Nicole Andrea Torres (CHI)	50	11	61	1
6	Melisa Gil (ARG)	115	19	134	0
