= Shooting at the 2008 Summer Olympics – Women's skeet =

Women's skeet at the Games of the XXIX Olympiad
- Venue: Beijing Shooting Range Clay Target Field
- Date: August 14, 2008
- Competitors: 19 from 19 nations
- Winning score: 93 (OR)

Medalists
1st place, gold medalist(s)		Chiara Cainero	Italy
2nd place, silver medalist(s)		Kim Rhode	United States
3rd place, bronze medalist(s)		Christine Brinker	Germany

The Women's skeet event at the 2008 Olympic Games took place on August 14 at the Beijing Shooting Range Clay Target Field.

The event consisted of two rounds: a qualifier and a final. In the qualifier, each shooter fired 3 sets of 25 shots in the set order of skeet shooting.

The top 6 shooters in the qualifying round moved on to the final round. There, they fired one additional round of 25. The total score from all 100 shots was used to determine final ranking. Ties are broken using a shoot-off; additional shots are fired one at a time until there is no longer a tie.

== Records ==
Prior to this competition, the existing world and Olympic records were as follows.

Qualification records
World record	Elena Little (GBR); Shi Hong Yan (CHN); Christine Brinker (GER); Zemfira Meftahatdinova (AZE); Erdzhanik Avetisyan (RUS); Christine Brinker (GER); Danka Barteková (SVK)	74	Belgrade, Serbia; Qingyuan, China; Qingyuan, China; Cairo, Egypt; Lonato, Italy; Nicosia, Cyprus; Nicosia, Cyprus	17 July 2005; 9 April 2006; 9 April 2006; 18 May 2006; 13 June 2007; 9 July 2008; 9 July 2008
Olympic record	ISSF Rule changed on 01.01.2005	–	–	–

Final records
World record	Danka Barteková (SVK)	99 (74+25)	Nicosia, Cyprus	9 July 2008
Olympic record	ISSF Rule changed on 01.01.2005	–	–	–

== Qualification round ==
Rank	Athlete	Country	1	2	3	Total	Notes
1	Chiara Cainero	Italy	25	23	24	72	Q OR
2	Sutiya Jiewchaloemmit	Thailand	23	23	25	71	Q
3	Kim Rhode	United States	24	23	23	70	Q
4	Christine Brinker	Germany	25	22	23	70	Q
5	Wei Ning	China	25	23	22	70	Q
6	Nathalie Larsson	Sweden	23	23	23	69	Q
7	Andri Eleftheriou	Cyprus	22	23	22	67	
8	Danka Barteková	Slovakia	23	22	22	67	
9	Pak Jong-ran	North Korea	20	23	23	66	
10	Lucia Mihalache	Romania	23	20	23	66	
11	Natalia Rahman	Australia	22	23	21	66	
12	Svetlana Demina	Russia	22	23	21	66	
13	Diána Igaly	Hungary	22	23	21	66	
14	Elena Little	Great Britain	24	21	21	66	
15	Zemfira Meftahatdinova	Azerbaijan	22	21	20	63	
16	Veronique Girardet	France	22	22	19	63	
17	Marjut Heinonen	Finland	21	21	19	61	
18	Kim Min-ji	South Korea	21	18	16	55	
19	Mona El-Hawary	Egypt	18	16	16	50	

OR Olympic record – Q Qualified for final

== Final ==
Rank	Athlete	Qual	Final	Total	4th place shoot-off	Gold shoot-off	Silver shoot-off	Notes
1st place, gold medalist(s)	Chiara Cainero (ITA)	72	21	93		2		OR
2nd place, silver medalist(s)	Kim Rhode (USA)	70	23	93		1	2	OR
3rd place, bronze medalist(s)	Christine Brinker (GER)	70	23	93		1	1	OR
4	Nathalie Larsson (SWE)	69	23	92	2			
5	Sutiya Jiewchaloemmit (THA)	71	21	92	1			
6	Wei Ning (CHN)	70	21	91				

OR Olympic record
