= Nathalie Larsson =

Swedish sport shooter

Personal information
- Full name: Nathalie Linda Larsson
- Nationality: Sweden
- Born: 25 May 1984 (age 42) Uppsala, Sweden
- Height: 1.80 m (5 ft 11 in)
- Weight: 67 kg (148 lb)

Sport
- Sport: Shooting
- Event: Skeet
- Club: Dannemora JSK
- Coached by: Tore Brovold

Nathalie Linda Larsson (born May 25, 1984 in Uppsala) is a Swedish sport shooter. She won two gold medals in the women's skeet at the 2005 European Shooting Championships in Belgrade, Serbia, and at the 2009 European Shooting Championships in Osijek, Croatia, accumulating scores of 92 and 93 targets, respectively.

Larsson qualified for the women's skeet at the 2008 Summer Olympics in Beijing, after placing fourth from the 2007 ISSF World Cup series in the same venue, with a score of 94 targets. She narrowly lost a bronze medal by one point to Germany's Christine Brinker in the entire event, with a total score of 92 targets (69 in the preliminary rounds and 23 in the final), and a bonus of two from a fourth-place shoot-off (against Thailand's Sutiya Jiewchaloemmit).
