= Sena Can =

Turkish sport shooter (born 2001)

Sena Can Kökgöz
Personal information
- Nationality: Turkish
- Born: 10 November 2001 (age 24) Osmangazi, Bursa Province, Turkey

Sport
- Country: Turkey
- Sport: Shooting
- Event: Skeet
Medal record
Women's shooting
Representing Turkey
Islamic Solidarity Games
Gold medal – first place	2021 Konya	Skeet

Sena Can (born 10 November 2001) is a Turkish sport shooter, who competes in the skeet event. She was a national record holder. She qualified to participate at the 2024 Summer Olympics.

== Sport career ==
Can started sport shooting in 2016 with the encouragement and support of her father, who is a hunter. In the beginning, she was a member of Osmangazi Belediye Sports Club in her hometown.

She won several medals at Republic Cup and Federation Cup in skeet events. She won the gold medal in the Junior women's category at the 2019 Republic Cup in Konya, and set a new national record with 114 points. The same year, she became Turkish champion, and was selected to the national shooting team.

She took part at the 2019 World Shotgun Championships in Lonato del Garda, Italy competing in the Juniors category, and at the 2019 ISSF Junior World Cup in Suhl, Germany.

She took part at the 2022 Mediterranean Games in Oran, Algier, placing at ninth rank. She won the gold medal at the 2021 Islamic Solidarity Games in Konya, Turkey.

She set a new Turkish record with 121 hits while competing in the women's team event at the 2023 ISSF World Shooting Championships in Baku, Azerbaijan. She advanced to the finals with her teammates Nur Banu Balkancı and Çiğdem Özyaman Özenir, and placed seventh. She secured so a quota at the 2024 Summer Olympics. She competed at the Shooting at the 2023 European Games in Wrocław, Poland in the individual and team events without a success.

== Personal life ==
Sena Can was born in Osmangazi, Bursa Province on 10 November 2001. She married Fazıl Kökgöz in 2025.She lives in Konya.
