= Zemfira Meftahatdinova =

Azerbaijani sports shooter

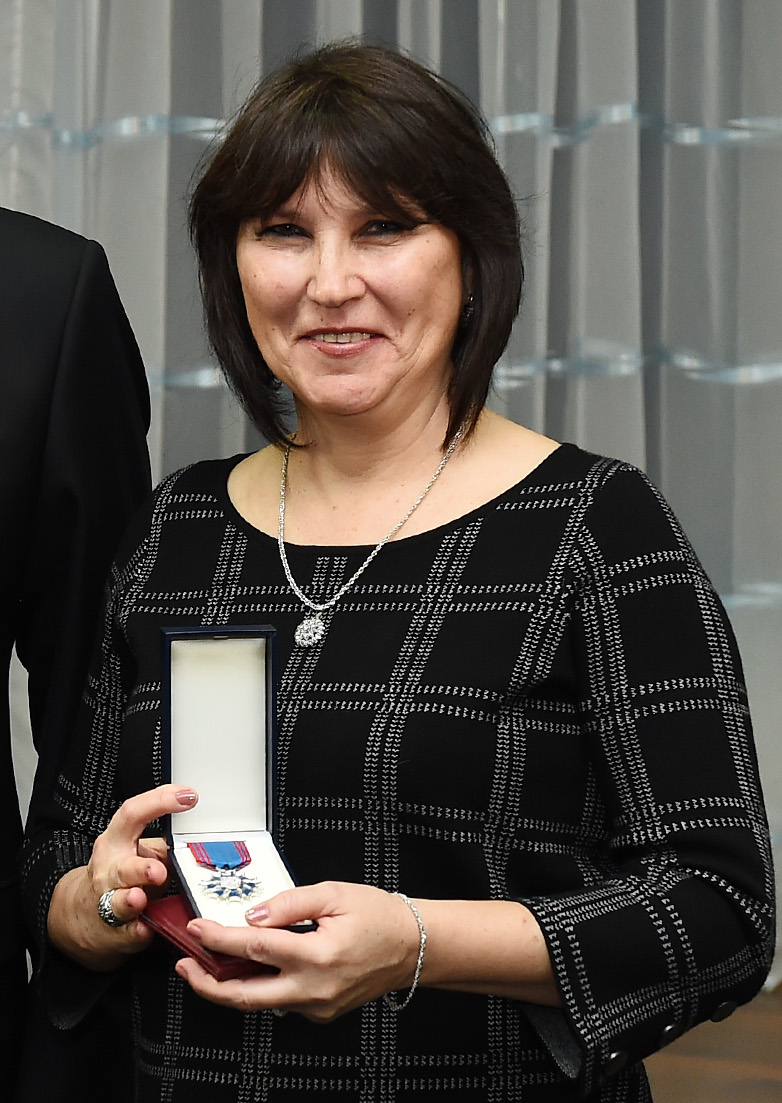
- Meftahatdinova in 2017 with her Honored Figure of Physical Education and Sports medal

Personal information
- Native name: Zemfira Meftahətdinova
- Born: 28 May 1963 (age 63) Baku, Azerbaijan SSR, Soviet Union
- Height: 1.64 m (5 ft 5 in)
- Weight: 66 kg (146 lb)

Sport
- Sport: Shooting
- Club: Dynamo Baku
Medal record
Representing Azerbaijan
Olympic Games
Gold medal – first place	2000 Sydney	Skeet
Bronze medal – third place	2004 Athens	Skeet
World Championships
Gold medal – first place	1995 Nikosia	Skeet
Gold medal – first place	2001 Cairo	Skeet
European Championships
Gold medal – first place	1993 Brno	Skeet
Gold medal – first place	1997 Sipoo	Skeet
Gold medal – first place	2003 Brno	Skeet
Bronze medal – third place	1995 Lahti	Skeet
Representing Soviet Union
European Championships
Silver medal – second place	1986 Montecatini	Skeet
Silver medal – second place	1988 Istanbul	Skeet
Silver medal – second place	1990 Uddevalla	Skeet
Bronze medal – third place	1987 Lahti	Skeet

Zemfira Ali gizi Meftahatdinova (Tatar: Зимфирә Гали кызы Мифтахетдинова, romanized: Zimfirä Ğäli qızı Miftaxetdineva, Azerbaijani: Zemfira Əli qızı Meftahətdinova, born 28 May 1963) is an Azerbaijani retired sport shooter who won two Olympic medals in skeet.

== Biography ==
Zemfira Meftahatdinova was born on 28 May 1963. While studying at school, she practiced artistic gymnastics. After moving to another district in Baku, where a shooting range was located near her home, she began visiting it. She quickly developed an interest for shooting and decided to pursue it as a sport.

In 1984, she graduated from the Azerbaijan State Academy of Physical Education and Sport. She competed for the Dynamo Baku club, and her personal coach was Hafiz Jafarov. She holds the rank of police colonel and has been serving as the Chairperson of the Athletic Society of the Ministry of Internal Affairs of Azerbaijan since 2015. She is also the Vice President of the National Olympic Committee of Azerbaijan and, since 15 December 2021, the Vice President of the Azerbaijan Shooting Federation.

== Sports career ==
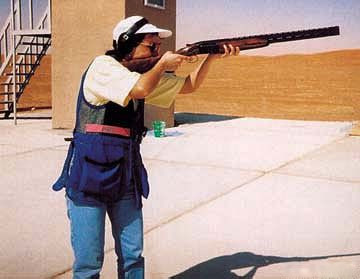
Zemfira Meftahatdinova at the 2000 Summer Olympics

In 1993, she became the European champion, and in 1995, the world champion. At the 2000 Summer Olympics in Sydney, she won the first gold medal for the Azerbaijan national team in trap shooting with a score of 73+25. At the 2004 Summer Olympics in Athens, she placed third in trap shooting with a score of 71+22. She also participated in the 2008 Summer Olympics in Beijing, where she finished 15th in trap shooting, hitting 63 targets.

== Accolades ==
In January 1991, Zemfira Meftakhetdinova was awarded an Honorary Diploma of the Azerbaijan SSR. In March 1995, she received the Taraggi Medal for her achievements in international competitions and her contribution to Azerbaijani sports. In recognition of her performance at the 2000 Sydney Olympics and her efforts in the development of Azerbaijani sports, she was honored with the Shohrat Order. In September 2004, she was again recognized for her role in Azerbaijani sports and the Olympic team's success, receiving the Taraggi Medal. In May 2016, she was awarded the For Sporting Courage Medal. In 2017, Zemfira Meftahatdinova was awarded the honorary title of Honored Figure of Physical Education and Sports of Azerbaijan for her contributions to the development of physical culture and sports in Azerbaijan. In May 2023, she was honored with the "Woman Sport" award by the International Olympic Committee.

== Olympic results ==
Event	2000	2004	2008
Skeet	(gold) Gold; 73+25	(bronze) Bronze; 71+22	15th 63
