= Chiara Costa =

Italian-Senegalese sports shooter

Personal information
- Full name: Chiara Costa
- Nationality: Italian; Senegalese
- Born: 29 May 1975 (age 49); Rome, Italy
- Weight: 56 kg (123 lb)

Sport
- Country: Italy (2014–18); Senegal (2020–present)
- Sport: Sports shooting

Chiara Costa (born 29 May 1975) is an Italian-Senegalese sports shooter. She competed in the women's skeet event at the 2020 Summer Olympics.

She resides in Rome and also works as a teacher and journalist.
