= Shooting at the 2021 Islamic Solidarity Games =

Shooting competition

- Venue: Saraçoğlu Sport Complex
- Dates: 10–15 August 2022

Shooting at the 2021 Islamic Solidarity Games was held in Konya, Turkey from 10 to 15 August 2022 in Konya Saraçoğlu Sport Complex.

The Games were originally scheduled to take place from 20 to 29 August 2021 in Konya, Turkey. In May 2020, the Islamic Solidarity Sports Federation (ISSF), who are responsible for the direction and control of the Islamic Solidarity Games, postponed the games as the 2020 Summer Olympics were postponed to July and August 2021, due to the global COVID-19 pandemic.

== Medal table ==
* Host nation (Turkey)

Rank	Nation	Gold	Silver	Bronze	Total
1	Kuwait (KUW)	3	3	0	6
2	Turkey (TUR)*	2	2	2	6
3	Azerbaijan (AZE)	1	1	0	2
4	Morocco (MAR)	0	0	2	2
5	Bahrain (BHR)	0	0	1	1
5	Qatar (QAT)	0	0	1	1
Totals (6 entries)		6	6	6	18

== Medal summary ==
=== Men ===
Event	Gold	Silver	Bronze
Trap	Abdulrahman Al-Faihan; Kuwait	Talal Al-Rashidi; Kuwait	Rashid Hamad Al-Athba; Qatar
Skeet	Mansour Al-Rashidi; Kuwait	Muhammet Seyhun Kaya; Turkey	Mustafa Serhat Sahin; Turkey

=== Women ===
Event	Gold	Silver	Bronze
Trap	Sara Al-Hawal; Kuwait	Safiye Sarıtürk Temizdemir; Turkey	Yasmine Marirhi; Morocco
Skeet	Sena Can; Turkey	Nurlana Jafarova; Azerbaijan	Maryam Hassani; Bahrain

=== Mixed team ===
Event	Gold	Silver	Bronze
Trap mixed team	Turkey; Safiye Sarıtürk Temizdemir; Oğuzhan Tüzün	Kuwait; Sara Al-Hawal; Talal Al-Rashidi	Morocco; Yasmine Marirhi; Abdelmounaim Bouain
Skeet mixed team	Azerbaijan; Nurlana Jafarova; Fuad Gurbanov	Kuwait; Eman Al-Shamaa; Abdulaziz Al-Saad	Turkey; Nur Banu Balkancı; Mustafa Serhat Şahin
