= Natalia Vinogradova (sport shooter) =

Russian sport shooter

Personal information
- Nationality: Russian
- Born: 14 July 1993 (age 31); Moscow, Russia

Sport
- Sport: Shooting

Natalia Vitaliyevna Vinogradova (Russian: Наталья Витальевна Виноградова; born 14 July 1993) is a Russian sport shooter. She represented Russia at the 2020 Summer Olympics in Tokyo, where she took part in the skeet event, qualifying to the finals, where she finished sixth.
