= Amber English =

American sport shooter

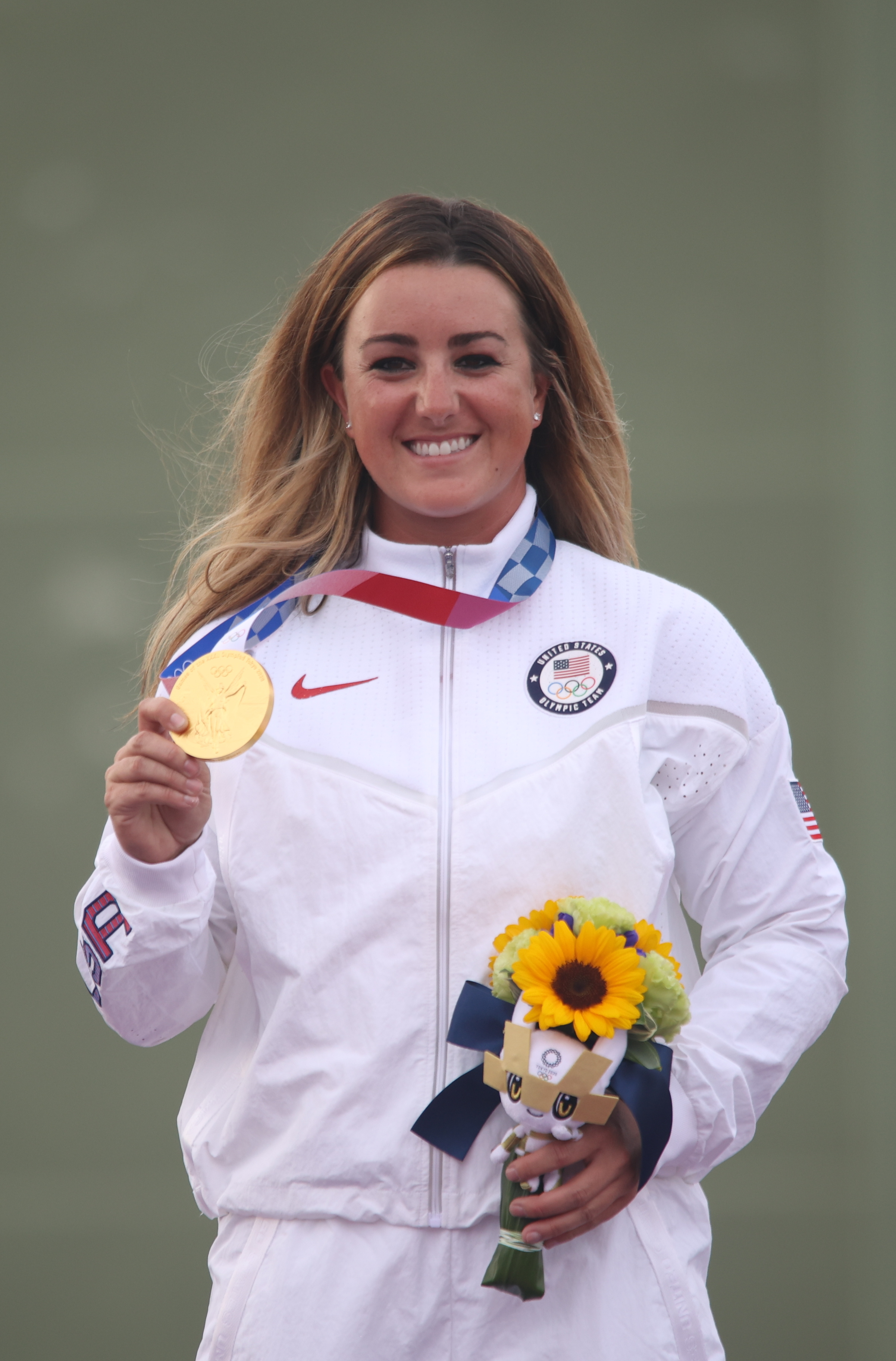
- English wins gold in skeet at 2020 Summer Olympic Games

Personal information
- Born: October 25, 1989 (age 37) Colorado Springs, Colorado, U.S.
- Education: University of Colorado Colorado Springs
- Height: 5 ft 4 in (163 cm)
- Weight: 135 lb (61 kg)

Sport
- Country: United States
- Sport: Shooting
- Event: Skeet
- Club: U.S. Army WCAP
- Military career
- Allegiance: United States
- Branch: United States Army
- Service years: 2017–present
- Rank: Captain
Medal record
Women's shooting
Representing the United States
Olympic Games
Gold medal – first place	2020 Tokyo	Skeet
World Championships
Gold medal – first place	2018 Changwon	Skeet team
Bronze medal – third place	2018 Changwon	Skeet

Amber English (born October 25, 1989) is an American sport shooter who won the gold medal in the women's skeet at the 2020 Olympic Games in Tokyo, Japan, setting a new Olympic record of 56. Amber English is currently serving as a First lieutenant in the United States Army.

== Early life ==
Born to a family of hunters and sport shooters, English began shooting at age 6. She later attended the University of Colorado Colorado Springs.

== Career ==
She participated at the 2018 ISSF World Shooting Championships, winning two medals including a gold medal in the skeet team event.

English was elected to the ISSF Athletes Committee at the 2023 World Championships in Baku.

== Gallery ==
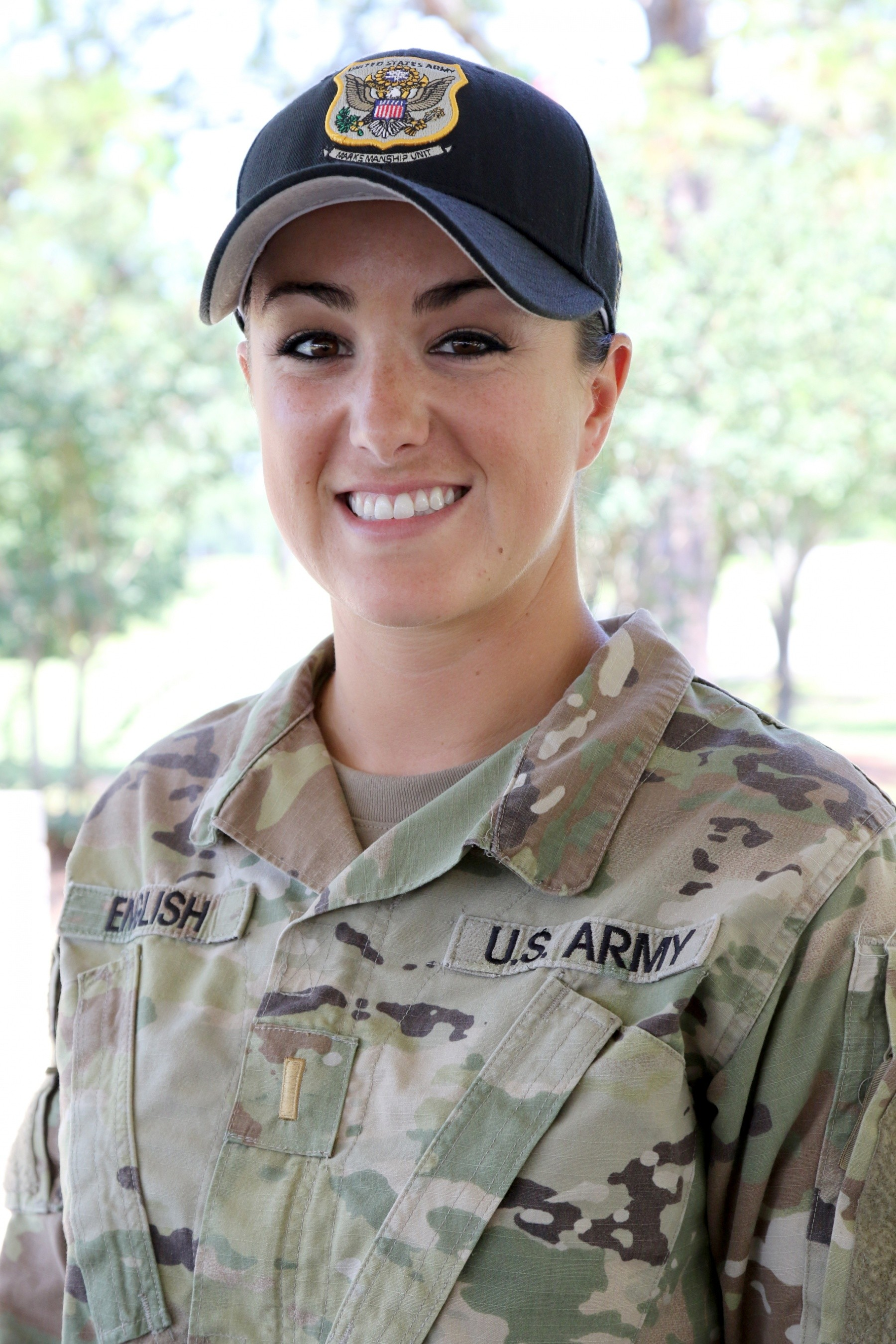
English in 2018

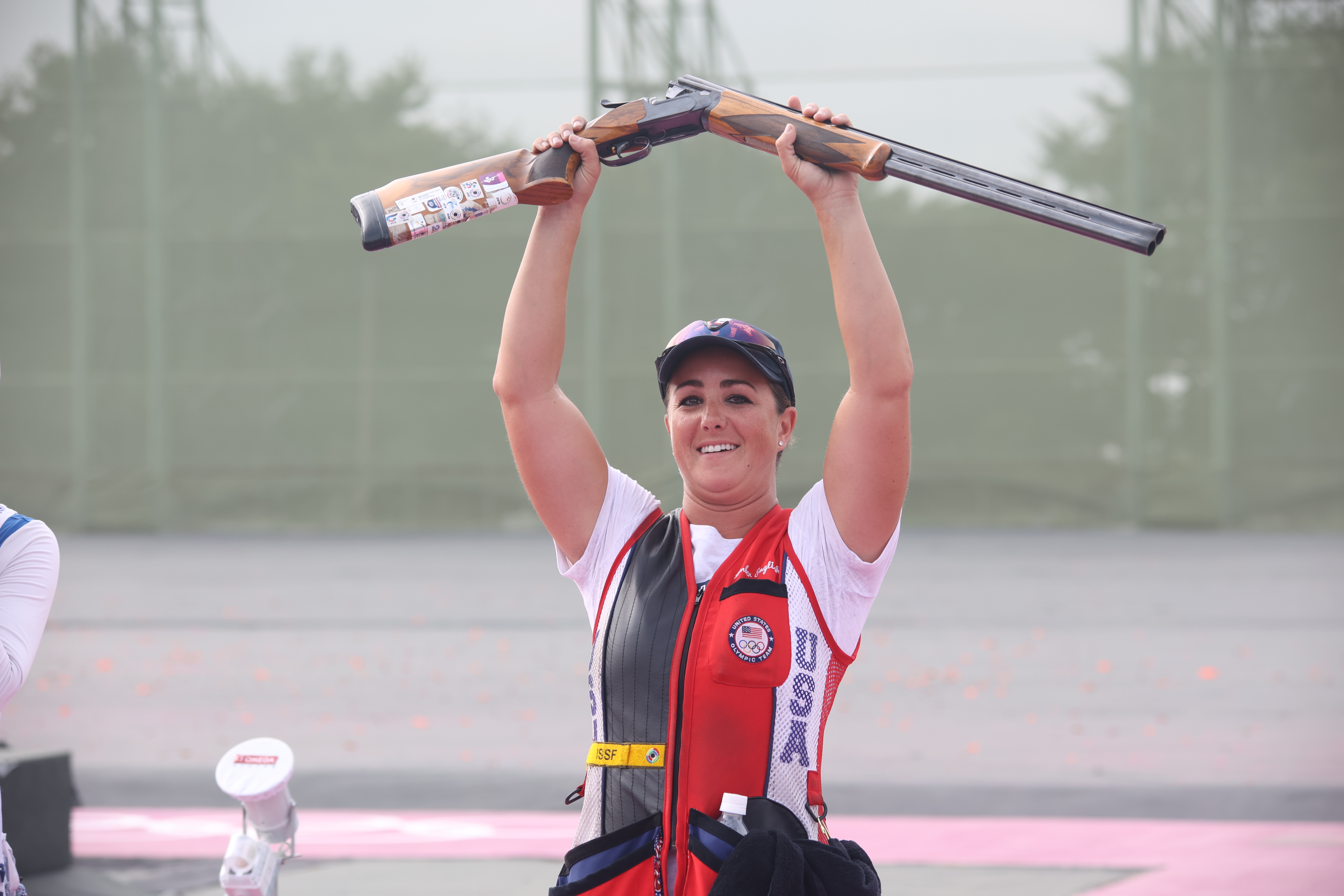
English at 2020 Summer Olympic Games
