= Chiara Cainero =

Italian sport shooter (born 1978)

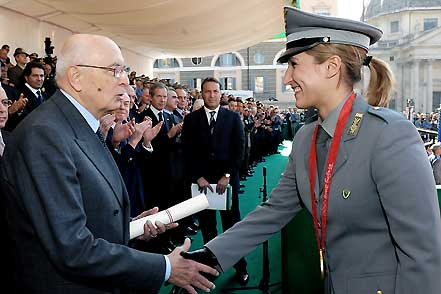
- Chiara Cainero with the former President of Italy, Giorgio Napolitano

Personal information
- Nationality: Italian
- Born: 24 March 1978 (age 48) Udine, Italy
- Height: 1.70 m (5 ft 7 in)
- Weight: 65 kg (143 lb)

Sport
- Country: Italy
- Sport: Shooting
- Event: Skeet
- Club: G.S. Forestale
Medal record
| Event | 1st | 2nd | 3rd |
|---|---|---|---|
| Olympic Games | 1 | 1 | 0 |
| World Championships | 0 | 2 | 1 |
| World Cup Final | 1 | 1 | 1 |
| World Cup | 4 | 4 | 5 |
| European Games | 1 | 0 | 2 |
| European Championships | 5 | 0 | 1 |
| Total | 12 | 8 | 10 |
| Event | 1st | 2nd | 3rd |
|---|---|---|---|
| World Championships | 1 | 5 | 4 |
| European Championships | 3 | 3 | 0 |
| Total | 4 | 8 | 4 |
Women's shooting
Representing Italy
Olympic Games
| Gold medal – first place | 2008 Beijing | Skeet individual |
| Silver medal – second place | 2016 Rio de Janeiro | Skeet individual |
World Championships
| Silver medal – second place | 2006 Zagreb | Skeet individual |
| Silver medal – second place | 2018 Changwon | Skeet team |
| Silver medal – second place | 2019 Lonato | Skeet team |
| Silver medal – second place | 2022 Osijek | Skeet team |
| Bronze medal – third place | 2007 Nicosia | Skeet individual |
European Games
| Gold medal – first place | 2019 Minsk | Mixed skeet pairs |
| Bronze medal – third place | 2015 Baku | Skeet individual |
| Bronze medal – third place | 2019 Minsk | Skeet individual |
European Championships
| Gold medal – first place | 2006 Maribor | Skeet individual |
| Gold medal – first place | 2007 Granada | Skeet individual |
| Gold medal – first place | 2013 Suhl | Skeet individual |
| Gold medal – first place | 2014 Sarlóspuszta | Skeet individual |
| Gold medal – first place | 2016 Lonato | Skeet individual |
| Bronze medal – third place | 2015 Baku | Skeet individual |

Chiara Cainero (born 24 March 1978) is an Italian sport shooter who won a gold medal in Skeet at the 2008 Summer Olympics.

At the age of 41 she qualified for the Tokyo Olympics 2020.

== Biography ==
Cainero has competed at three Olympic Games, becoming the first Italian woman to win gold in skeet shooting at the Beijing Olympics. She has also won a silver and a bronze medal at the ISSF world championships.

Cainero is an athlete of the Centro Sportivo Carabinieri.

== Achievements ==
| Year | Competition | Venue | Position | Event | Notes |
|---|---|---|---|---|---|
| 2004 | Olympic Games | (Greece) Athens | 8th | Skeet | |
| 2008 | Olympic Games | (China) Beijing | 1st | Skeet | Olympic record |
| 2012 | Olympic Games | (United Kingdom) London | 5th | Skeet | |
| 2016 | Olympic Games | (Brazil) Rio de Janeiro | 2nd | Skeet | |
| 2020 | Olympic Games | (Japan) Tokyo | 20th | Skeet | |

== See also ==
- Italian sportswomen multiple medalists at Olympics and World Championships
