= Cyprus at the 2015 European Games =

- IOC code: CYP
- NOC: Cyprus Olympic Committee
- Website: www.olympic.org.cy

in Baku, Azerbaijan 12 – 28 June 2015
- Competitors: 23 in 10 sports
- Flag bearer: Marios Yeoryiou
- Medals Ranked 36th: Gold 0 Silver 1 Bronze 0 Total 1

European Games appearances (overview)
- 2015; 2019; 2023; 2027

Cyprus competed at the 2015 European Games in Baku, Azerbaijan, from 12 to 28 June 2015.

== Medalists ==
| Medal | Name | Sport | Event | Date |
|---|---|---|---|---|
| Silver | Georgios Achilleos; Andri Eleftheriou | Shooting | Mixed Skeet | 22 June |

== Archery ==
| Athlete | Event | Ranking round | | Round of 64 | Round of 32 | Round of 16 | Quarterfinals | Semifinals | Final / BM | |
| Athlete | Event | Score | Seed | Opposition Score | Opposition Score | Opposition Score | Opposition Score | Opposition Score | Opposition Score | Rank |
|---|---|---|---|---|---|---|---|---|---|---|
| Mimis El Helali | Men's individual | 638 | 48 | Naploszek (POL); L 3–7 | Did not advance | | | | | 33 |
| Mikaella Kourouna | Women's individual | 615 | 48 | Marchenko (UKR); L 2–6 | Did not advance | | | | | 33 |
| Mikaella Kourouna; Mimis El Helali | Mixed Team | 1253 | 25 | —N/a | | Did not advance | | | | 25 |

== Gymnastics ==
=== Artistic ===
- Women's individual – 1 quota place

== Shooting ==
Mixed Skeet – Georgios Achilleos & Andri Eleftheriou (silver)
