= Nadine Messerschmidt =

German sport shooter (born 1993)

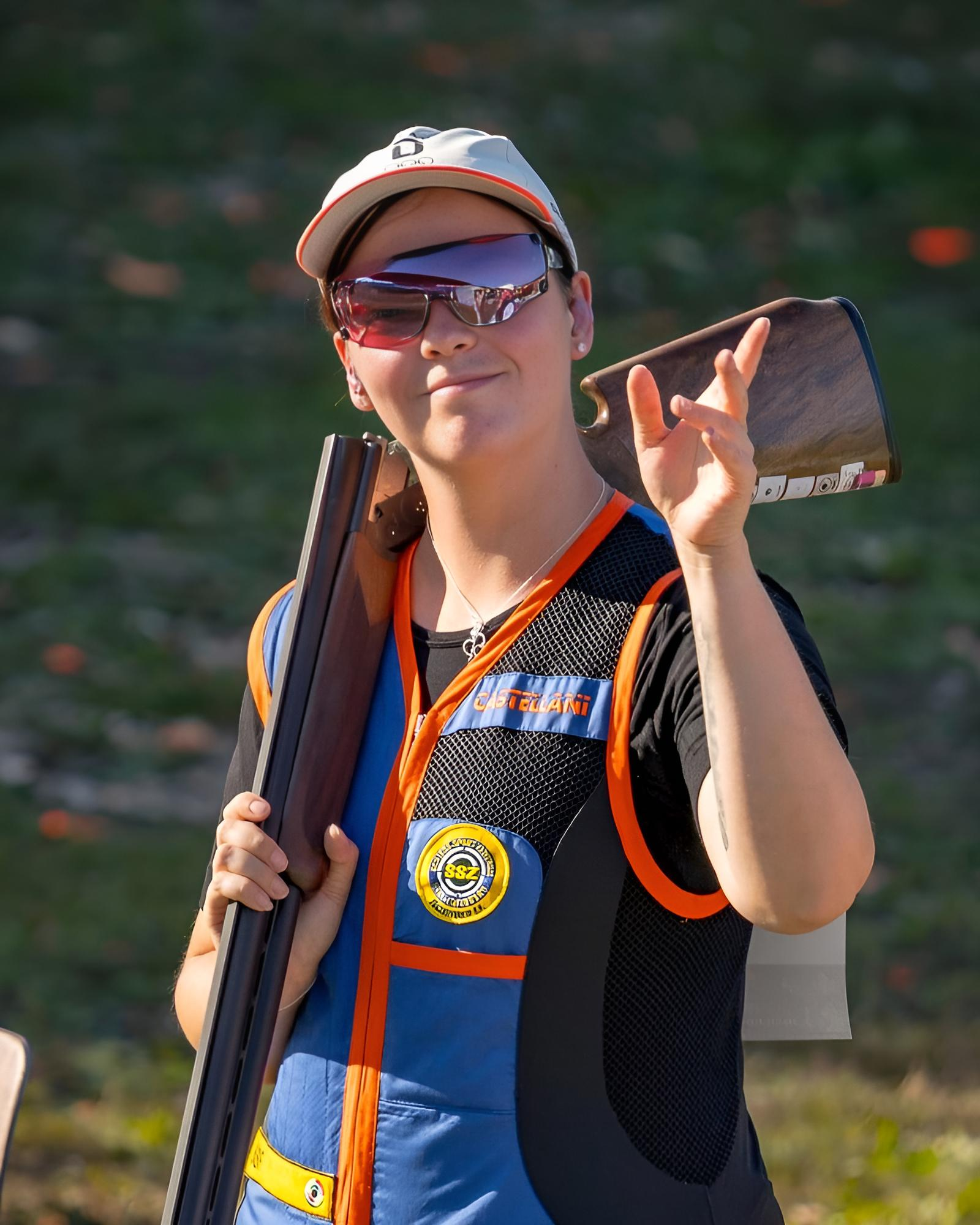
- Nadine Messerschmidt 2021

Personal information
- Nationality: German
- Born: 15 September 1993 (age 32) Suhl, Germany

Sport
- Sport: Shooting
Medal record
Women's shooting
Representing Germany
European Games
Bronze medal – third place	2023 Kraków-Małopolska	Skeet
European Shooting Championships
Gold medal – first place	2021 Osijek	Skeet team
Silver medal – second place	2018 Leobersdorf	Skeet team
Silver medal – second place	2022 Lanarka	Skeet
Silver medal – second place	2022 Lanarka	Skeet team
Bronze medal – third place	2018 Leobersdorf	Skeet mixed
ISSF World Cup
Gold medal – first place	2020 Nikosia	Skeet
Gold medal – first place	2022 Baku	Skeet team
Gold medal – first place	2023 Larnaka	Skeet mixed
Bronze medal – third place	2022 Lonato	Skeet
Bronze medal – third place	2022 Lonato	Skeet team
Bronze medal – third place	2023 Cairo	Skeet

Nadine Messerschmidt (born 15 September 1993) is a German sport shooter, born in Suhl. She won a gold medal in Skeet Team at the 2021 European Shooting Championships. She qualified to represent Germany at the 2020 Summer Olympics in Tokyo 2021, where she placed fifth in women's skeet.
