= Toronto International Trap and Skeet Club =

Sport gun club in Ontario, Canada

Coordinates: 44.18559°N 79.66410°W

- Interactive map of Toronto International Trap and Skeet Club
- Location: 5206 5 Side Rd, Innisfil, Ontario

Tenant
- 2015 Pan American Games

The Toronto International Trap and Skeet Club is a shooting facility located in Innisfil, Ontario, Canada. Despite the name, the facility is located 75 kilometres north of the city.

The facility opened in 1970 and in 2014 it was officially named the host venue of the shooting events at the 2015 Pan American Games scheduled in July 2015 in Toronto, where it was known as the Pan Am Shooting Centre. For the games a new permanent combined 25-metre and 50-metre range, a new separate 10-metre air rifle range and improvements two of the already existing trap and skeet ranges were built and renovated. During the Games the facility was known as the Pan Am Shooting Centre. A total of $6.2 million CAD was spent to upgrade the facilities for the games.

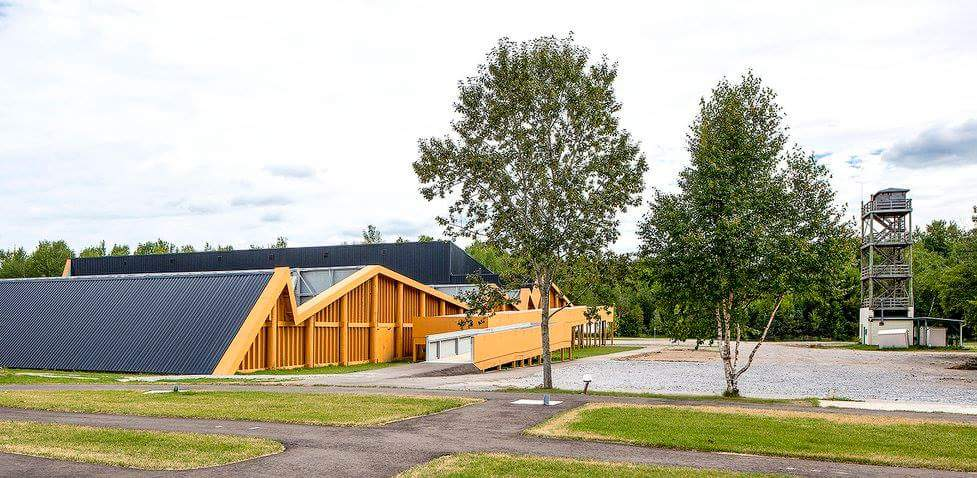
The Toronto International Trap and Skeet Club (Pan Am Shooting Centre), in Innisfil, Ontario, was the venue for the shooting competitions
