= Kim Rhode =

American sport shooter (born 1979)

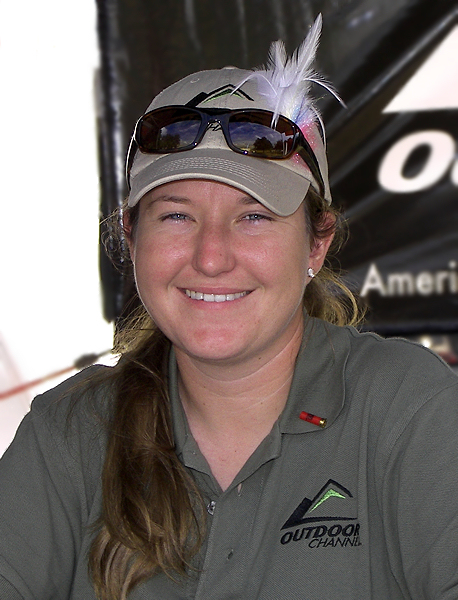
- Rhode at the Texas Parks and Wildlife Expo 2007

Personal information
- Full name: Kimberly Susan Rhode
- Born: July 16, 1979 (age 47) Whittier, California, U.S.
- Education: California State Polytechnic University, Pomona
- Height: 5 ft 4 in (163 cm)
- Weight: 180 lb (82 kg)

Sport
- Country: United States
- Sport: Shooting
- Events: Double trap, skeet
Medal record
Women's shooting
Representing United States
Olympic Games
Gold medal – first place	1996 Atlanta	Double trap
Gold medal – first place	2004 Athens	Double trap
Gold medal – first place	2012 London	Skeet
Silver medal – second place	2008 Beijing	Skeet
Bronze medal – third place	2000 Sydney	Double trap
Bronze medal – third place	2016 Rio	Skeet
World Championships
Gold medal – first place	1995 Nicosia	Skeet team
Gold medal – first place	1998 Barcelona	Double trap team
Gold medal – first place	2010 Münich	Skeet
Gold medal – first place	2010 Munich	Skeet team
Gold medal – first place	2015 Lonato	Skeet team
Gold medal – first place	2017 Moscow	Skeet team
Gold medal – first place	2018 Changwon	Skeet team
Gold medal – first place	2019 Lonato	Skeet team
Silver medal – second place	1998 Barcelona	Double trap
Silver medal – second place	2001 Cairo	Double trap team
Silver medal – second place	2002 Lahti	Double trap team
Silver medal – second place	2003 Nicosia	Double trap team
Silver medal – second place	2007 Nicosia	Skeet team
Silver medal – second place	2018 Changwon	Skeet
Bronze medal – third place	1995 Nicosia	Double trap team
Bronze medal – third place	2011 Belgrade	Skeet
Bronze medal – third place	2014 Granada	Skeet team
Pan American Games
Gold medal – first place	1999 Winnipeg	Double trap
Gold medal – first place	2003 Santo Domingo	Double trap
Gold medal – first place	2011 Guadalajara	Skeet
Gold medal – first place	2015 Toronto	Skeet
Gold medal – first place	2019 Lima	Skeet
Silver medal – second place	2007 Rio de Janeiro	Skeet

Kimberly Susan Rhode (born July 16, 1979) is an American double trap and skeet shooter. A California native, she is a six-time Olympic medal winner, including three gold medals, and six-time national champion in double trap. She is the most successful female shooter at the Olympics as the only triple Olympic Champion and the only woman to have won two Olympic gold medals for Double Trap. She won a gold medal in skeet shooting at the 2012 Summer Olympics, equaling the world record of 99 out of 100 clays. Most recently, she won the bronze medal at the Rio 2016 Olympics, making her the first Olympian to win a medal on five continents, the first Summer Olympian to win an individual medal at six consecutive summer games, and the first woman to medal in six consecutive Olympics.

== Early life ==
Kimberly Rhode was born in Whittier, California, in 1979. Rhode began sport hunting at an early age, traveling on African safaris by the age of 12. Rhode began competing in skeet at age 10.

== International competition ==
Rhode, at 13, won her first world championship title in women's double trap shooting. After double trap shooting was eliminated from the 2008 Summer Olympics, she has concentrated on skeet. Rhode became a Distinguished International Shooter in 1995 (Badge #388). In ISSF World Cup competition, she has won 19 Gold, 7 Silver, and 8 Bronze medals. At the 2007 World Cup competition in Santo Domingo, she set a new world record in this event with 98 hits (73 in the qualification round and a perfect 25 in the final).

=== 1996 Olympics ===
Rhode won a gold medal at the 1996 Summer Olympics, making her the youngest female gold medalist in the history of Olympic shooting.

=== 2000 Olympics ===
Rhode won a bronze medal at the 2000 Summer Olympics in Sydney, Australia.

=== 2004 Olympics ===
Rhode won a gold medal at the 2004 Summer Olympics in Athens in Women's Double trap.

=== 2008 Olympics ===
Rhode won the silver medal at the 2008 Summer Olympics in women's skeet.

=== 2012 Olympics ===
On July 29 at the 2012 Summer Olympics, Rhode won the gold medal in skeet shooting with an Olympic record score of 99, tying the world record in this event. With this medal, Rhode is the only American competitor to win medals for an individual event in five consecutive Olympics. She also became one of the three competitors (and the only woman) to win three Olympic individual gold medals for shooting, along with Ralf Schumann of Germany and Jin Jong-oh of Korea.

=== 2016 Olympics ===
Qualifying for the 2016 Summer Olympics made Rhode the first U.S. Olympian to qualify for an Olympic team on five different continents. Kim Rhode won the bronze medal at the Rio 2016 Olympics, making her the first Olympian to win a medal on five different continents, the first Summer Olympian to win an individual medal at six consecutive summer games, and the first woman to medal in six consecutive Olympics.

== TV Host ==
Rhode is co-host of the Outdoor Channel's TV program Step Outside. Rhode studied Pre-veterinary medicine at Cal Poly Pomona.

== Stolen competition shotgun ==
On September 11, 2008, Rhode's competition shotgun was stolen from her pickup; she had been using it in competition for eighteen years. The gun was returned to her in January 2009 after it was discovered during an unrelated search of a parolee's home; the parolee was charged with possession of stolen property. In the meantime fans had donated to buy her a new $13,000 Perazzi shotgun. Having become used to training with the new gun, she elected to retire "Old Faithful" after four Summer Games.

== Personal life ==
Rhode spoke at the 2012 Republican National Convention, introducing several other Olympians on the stage.

Rhode married Mike Harryman in 2009. Their son was born in 2013.

In addition to being a member of USA Shooting's National Team, Rhode is an honorary lifetime member of the National Rifle Association and a member of Safari Club International.

In July 2025, the US 9th Circuit Court of Appeals ruled in favor of Rhode's lawsuit against the State of California. Rhode asserted that the California law requiring a background check violated her rights. Quoting Townhall Magazine, "The 9th U.S. Circuit Court of Appeals ruled Thursday that California’s law requiring background checks for people purchasing ammunition is unconstitutional." The decision upholds a San Diego federal judge’s previous ruling that struck the law down.

== Awards ==
- ANOC Gala Awards 2015：Best Female Athlete of the Pan American Games 2015

== Career results ==
Olympic results
Event	1996	2000	2004	2008	2012	2016
Double trap	(gold) Gold; 108+33	(bronze) Bronze; 103+36	(gold) Gold; 110+36	Not held		
Skeet	Not held	7th 69	5th 68+23	(silver) Silver; 70+23	(gold) Gold; 74+25	(bronze) Bronze; 72+14+15(+3)
Trap	Not held	—	—	—	9th 68	—
