= Honored Figure of Physical Education and Sports =

Əməkdar Bədən Tərbiyəsi və İdman Xadimi
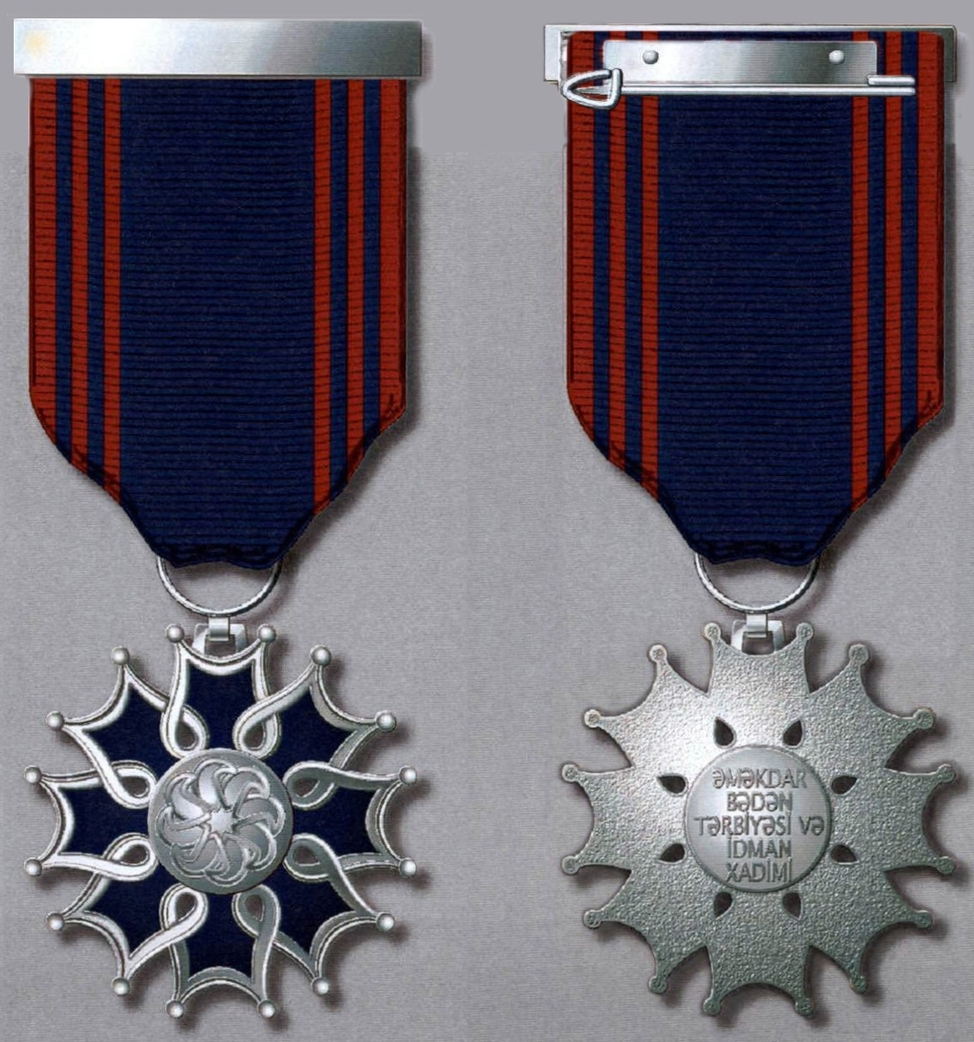
- Country: Azerbaijan

Honored Figure of Physical Education and Sports (Azerbaijani: Əməkdar bədən tərbiyəsi və idman xadimi) is an honorary title awarded to those who have made contributions to the development of physical education and sports in Azerbaijan.
