= Daniela Carraro =

Brazilian sports shooter (born 1985)

Personal information
- Nationality: Brazilian
- Born: 25 March 1985 (age 41)
- Height: 5'5
- Weight: 148 lb (67 kg)

Sport
- Sport: Sports shooting

Daniela Carraro (born 25 March 1985) is a Brazilian sports shooter. She competed in the women's skeet event at the 2016 Summer Olympics.
