= Diana Bacosi =

Italian sport shooter (born 1983)

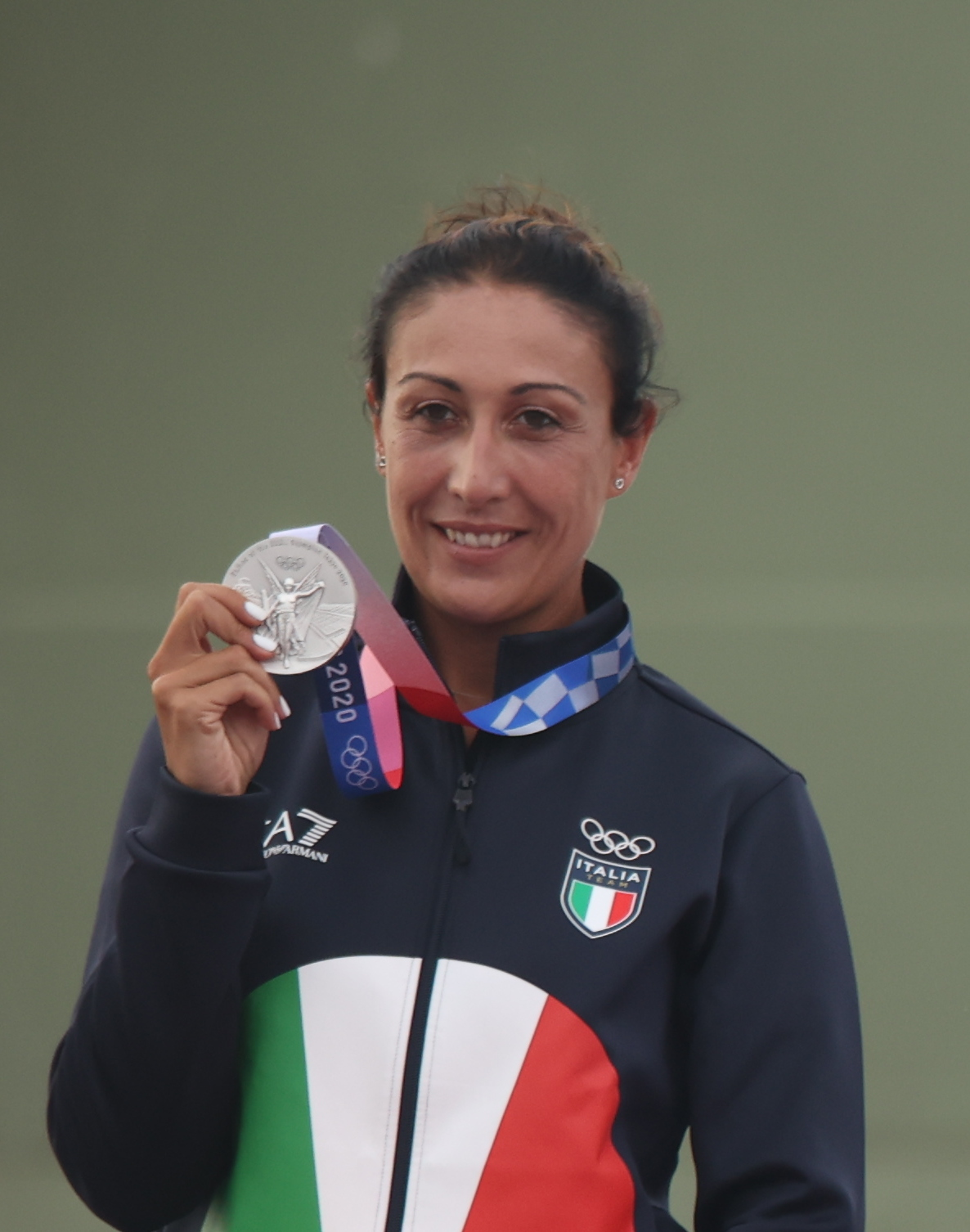
- Bacosi wins silver in skeet at 2020 Summer Olympic Games

Personal information
- Born: 13 July 1983 (age 43) Città della Pieve, Umbria, Italy
- Height: 1.75 m (5 ft 9 in)
- Weight: 80 kg (176 lb)

Sport
- Country: Italy
- Sport: Shooting
- Event: Skeet
- Club: Esercito Italiano
Medal record
Women's shooting
Representing Italy
Olympic Games
Gold medal – first place	2016 Rio de Janeiro	Skeet
Gold medal – first place	2024 Paris	Skeet mixed team
Silver medal – second place	2020 Tokyo	Skeet
World Championships
Gold medal – first place	2013 Lima	Skeet team
Gold medal – first place	2019 Lonato del Garda	Skeet
Gold medal – first place	2019 Lonato del Garda	Mixed skeet pairs
Gold medal – first place	2022 Osijek	Skeet
Silver medal – second place	2015 Lonato del Garda	Skeet team
Silver medal – second place	2017 Moscow	Skeet team
Silver medal – second place	2018 Changwon	Skeet team
Silver medal – second place	2019 Lonato del Garda	Skeet team
Silver medal – second place	2022 Osijek	Skeet team
Silver medal – second place	2022 Osijek	Mixed skeet team
Silver medal – second place	2023 Baku	Skeet team
Bronze medal – third place	2026 Doha	Skeet team
European Games
Gold medal – first place	2015 Baku	Mixed skeet pairs
Gold medal – first place	2019 Minsk	Skeet
Silver medal – second place	2015 Baku	Skeet
Silver medal – second place	2019 Minsk	Mixed skeet pairs
European Championships
Gold medal – first place	2013 Suhl	Skeet team
Gold medal – first place	2016 Lonato del Garda	Mixed skeet pairs
Gold medal – first place	2019 Lonato del Garda	Skeet team
Gold medal – first place	2023 Osijek	Skeet team
Gold medal – first place	2024 Lonato	Skeet
Gold medal – first place	2026 Athens	Skeet team
Silver medal – second place	2014 Sarlóspuszta	Skeet team
Silver medal – second place	2016 Lonato del Garda	Skeet team
Silver medal – second place	2017 Baku	Skeet team
Silver medal – second place	2018 Leobersdorf	Mixed skeet pairs
Silver medal – second place	2021 Osijek	Skeet team
Silver medal – second place	2022 Larnaca	Mixed skeet pairs
Silver medal – second place	2023 Osijek	Skeet
Silver medal – second place	2024 Lonato	Skeet team
Silver medal – second place	2026 Athens	Skeet
Bronze medal – third place	2017 Baku	Mixed skeet pairs
Bronze medal – third place	2018 Leobersdorf	Skeet team
Bronze medal – third place	2023 Osijek	Mixed team skeet
Mediterranean Games
Silver medal – second place	2022 Oran	Skeet mixed team
Bronze medal – third place	2022 Oran	Skeet

Diana Bacosi (born 13 July 1983) is an Italian shooter. She began shooting at 14. She represented her country in Women's skeet shooting at the 2016 Summer Olympics where she won the gold medal, and at the 2020 Summer Olympics where she won the silver medal.

== Career ==
Bacosi began shooting at the age of 14, as it was a family tradition. At the age of 18, she narrowed her passion for shooting and focused on skeet shooting professionally. She made her debut in 2004 on the ISSF "world stage during the European Championships in Nicosia, where she finished in 16th position."

In the 2005 World Cup in Brazil, Bacosi finished second place. Bacosi was awarded a bronze medal for Supporting Merit in 2007. The following year she won Gold in the World Cup at Suhl and Silver at the World Cup in Beijing. In 2008, as well, she gained a silver medal for Supporting Merit and "was also awarded the "Discobolo d’Oro" (Golden Discus) by the Italian Sports Centre National Council."

In 2011, she received another Silver Medal in the Tucson desert and the "Stella d’Oro" (Silver Star) for Athletic Valour. In 2013 she was awarded the silver medal at the World Cup in Acapulco and two bronze medals respectively at Nicosia and the final in Abu Dhabi. In the same year, she won the World Championships in Lima.

Bacosi continued to place Bronze in the World Cup Finals in Abu Dhabi (2013), Gabala (2014), Nicosia (2015), Rome (2016), and then subsequently won Silver in New Delhi in 2017. She won the World Cup in 2015 in Larnaka and Al Ain, respectively.

Bacosi's biggest achievement was when she won the Olympic gold medal in Women's Skeet Shooting in Rio de Janeiro in 2016. Talking about the win, Bacosi said: "winning an Olympic medal is a unique emotion, also because you get there after a long preparation" but when asked if it was more exciting than becoming a mother she replied: "no, that’s above all and everyone. But gold comes soon after."

In 2018, Bacosi began competing in Skeet Women (SK125W) competitions. From this, she achieved Gold in Changwon in 2018, and Lonato in 2019. She won Gold for the European games in 2019 and won several silver medals in 2018 and 2019 in Changwon, Siggiewi, Acapulco and Al Ain.

In 2019, Bacosi began competing in the Skeet Mixed Team (SKMIX) and won Gold that year in Lonato and Silver in Minsk. She was selected to partake in the 2020 Tokyo Olympics before they were delayed by COVID-19.

== Personal life ==
Bacosi gave birth to her first son, Mattia, who was born on 13 February 2009. On 11 November 2011, Bacosi married a man named Vincent.

== Awards and honors ==
- Bronze Medal for Sporting Merit - 2007
- Discobolo d’Oro (Golden Discus Thrower) - 2008
- Stella d’Oro (Golden Star) for Athletic Valor - 2011
