= Therese Lundqvist =

Swedish sport shooter (born 1990)

Medal record

Representing Sweden

Women's shooting

World Junior Championships
Gold medal – first place	Maribor 2009	Clay pigeon shooting

European Junior Championships
Gold medal – first place	2009	Clay pigeon shooting

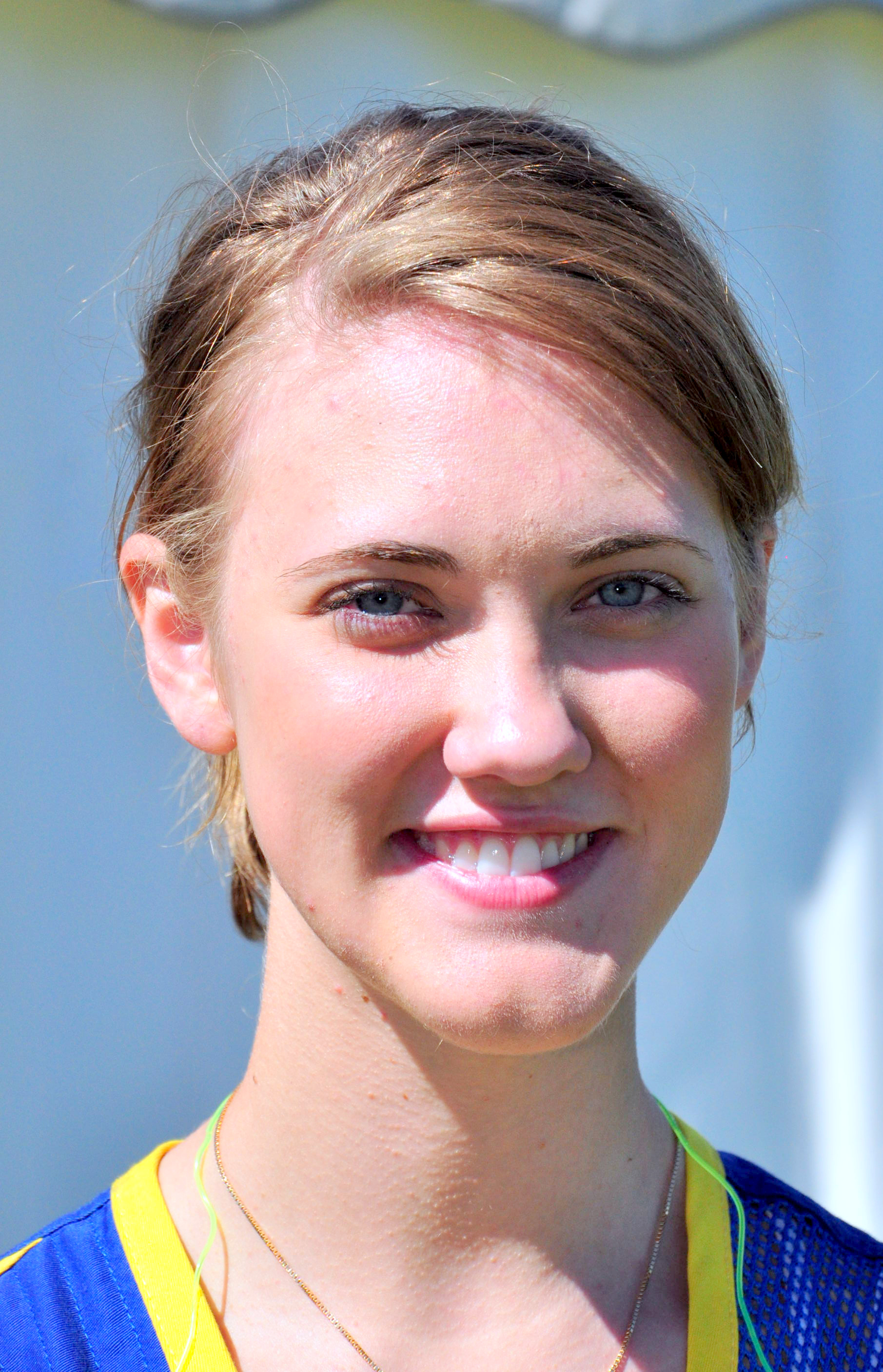
Therese Lundqvist at the 2011 Elmia Game Fair in Jönköping.

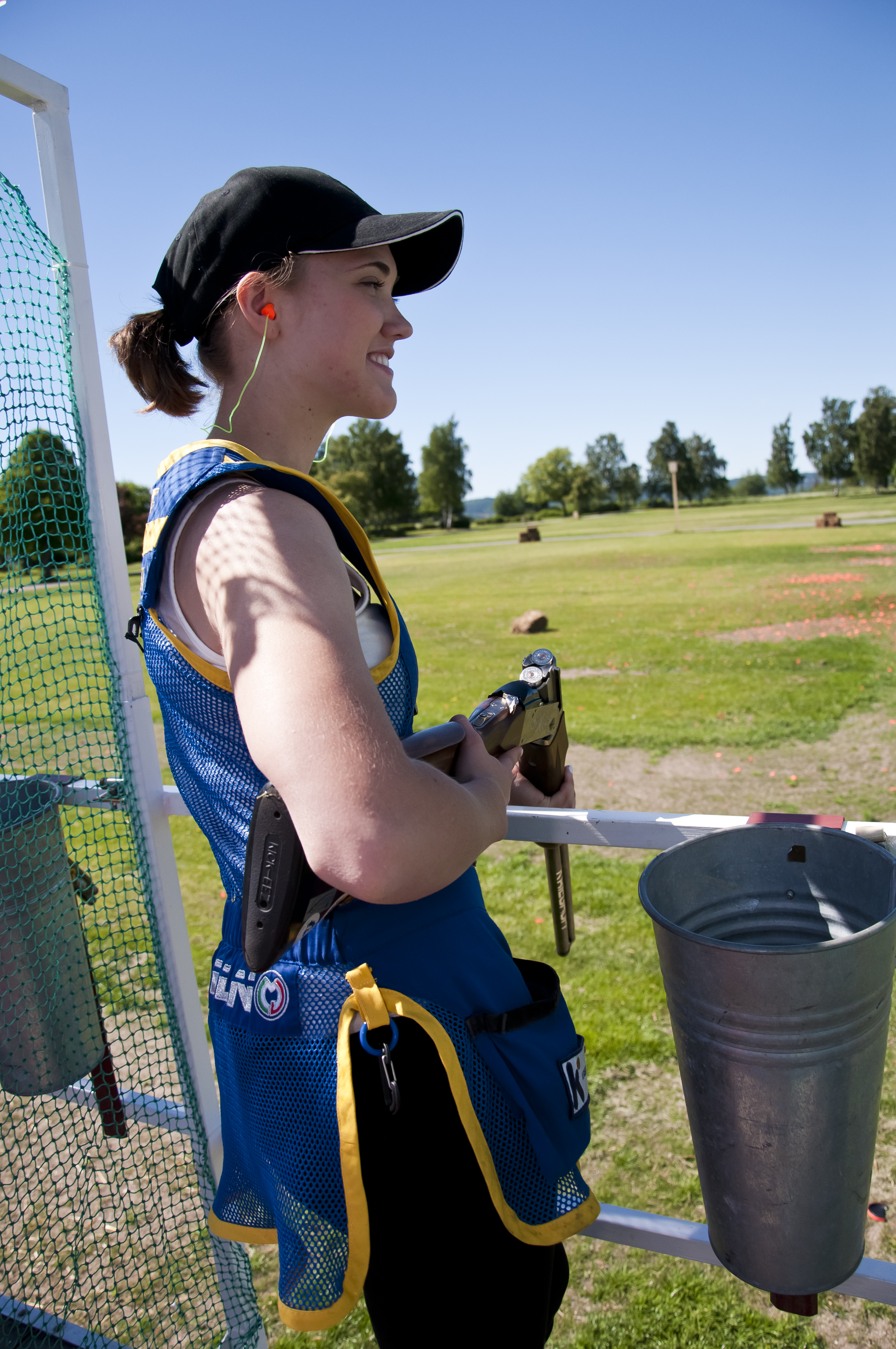
Lundqvist at the shooting range.

Maria-Therese Christina Lundqvist (born 23 August 1990 in Uppsala) is a Swedish clay pigeon shooter. She is member of Uppsala JSK and is trained by her father Gert-Ove Lundqvist.

Lundqvist qualified for the 2012 Olympic Games, and finished 7th in the skeet event. She had previously won the world junior event in that weapon in 2009. She also won the European junior event that year.

Current world records held in Olympic skeet
Junior Women	Individual	74	Therese Lundqvist (SWE)	11 August 2009	Maribor (SLO)
