= Albina Shakirova =

Russian sports shooter (born 1987)

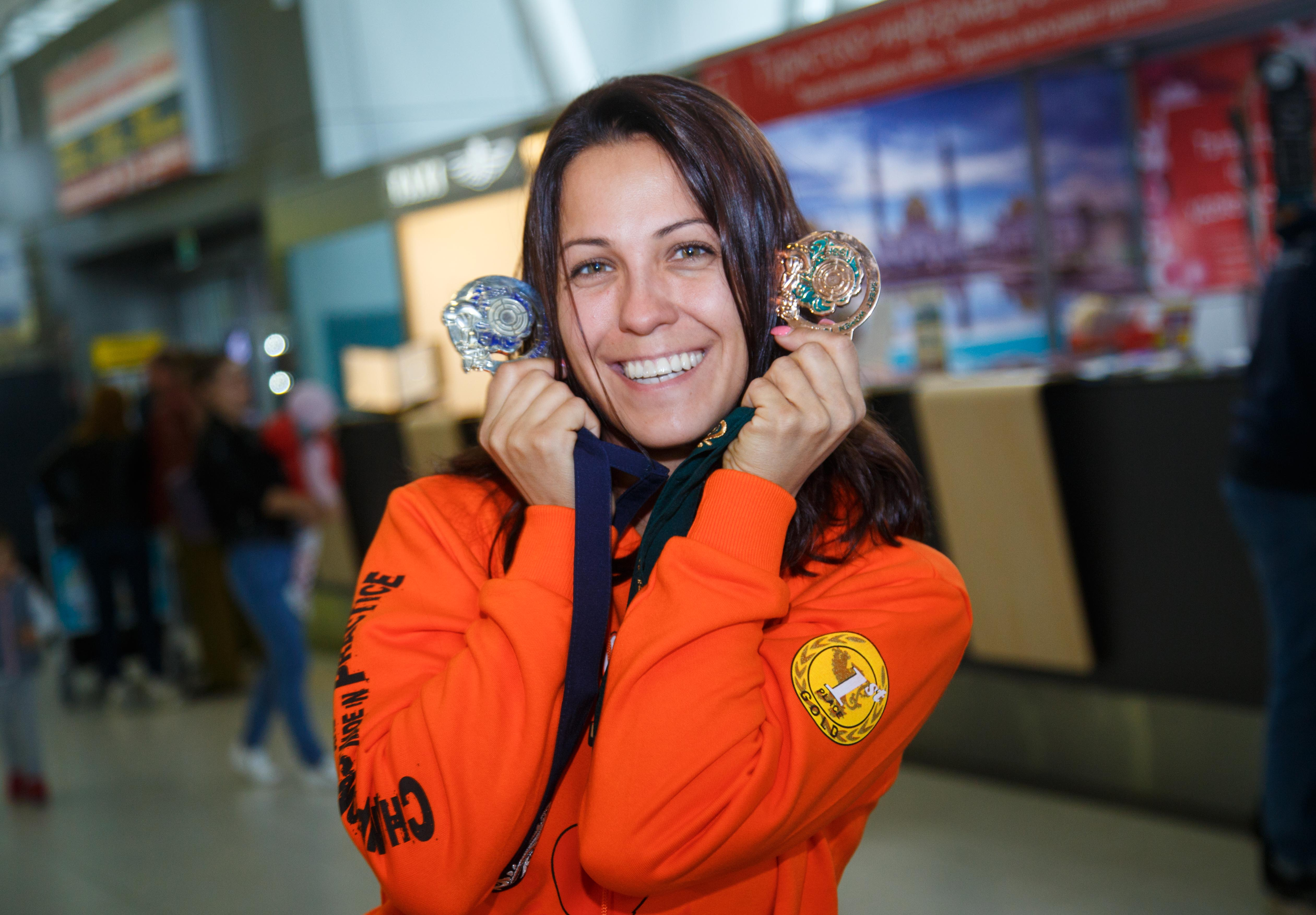

Personal information
- Born: 30 March 1987 (age 37)

Sport
- Sport: Sports shooting

Albina Shakirova (born 30 March 1987) is a Russian sports shooter. She competed in the women's skeet event at the 2016 Summer Olympics.
