= Nur Banu Özpak =

Turkish sport shooter (born 1996)

Nur Banu Paköz
Personal information
- Nationality: Turkish
- Born: 21 January 1996 (age 30) Karatay, Konya Province, Turkey
- Height: 1.63 m (5 ft 4 in)

Sport
- Country: Turkey
- Sport: Shooting
- Event: Skeet
- Club: Karatay Belediyesi Sport Club
Medal record
Women's shooting
Representing Turkey
Islamic Solidarity Games
Bronze medal – third place	2021 Konya	Mixed team Skeet
Gold medal – first place	2017 Baku	Skeet
Bronze medal – third place	2017 Baku	Mixed team Skeet
European Shotgun Championships
Bronze medal – third place	2016 Lonato	Junior Team Skeet
ISSF Junior World Cup
Bronze medal – third place	2016 Qabala	Junior Skeet
Gold medal – first place	2016 Qabala	Junior Team Skeet
Bronze medal – third place	2016 Suhl	Junior Team Skeet

Nur Banu Özpak (born 21 January 1996), also known as Nur Banu Balkancı after her marriage, is a Turkish sport shooter, who competes in the skeet event. She is the holder of two national records. She is also a coach.

== Early years ==
Nur Banu Özpak learned sport shooting in 2001 with the support of her father. She has been a licensed member of the Karatay Belediyesi Sport Club in her hometown since 2008. She started her career in 2009, and began participating in competitions in 2010. Özpak was selected to the national skeet team in 2011. The 1.63 m (5 ft 4 in)-tall sportswoman's personal oach is Ahmet Balkancı, and she is coached in the national team by Duygu Tüzün. She serves also as a coach.

== Sport career ==
In the Suhl, Germany leg of the 2016 ISSF Junior World Cup, she received the bronze medal in the team event, and in the Qabala, Azerbaijan leg, she took the bronze medal in the individual event, and the gold medal in the team event. She took the bronze medal in the Junior team event at the 2016 European Shotgun Championships in Lonato, Italy.

She won the gold medal at the 2017 Islamic Solidarity Games in Baku, Azerbaijan, and the bronze medal in the mixed team event.

She won the bronze medal with her teammate Mustafa Serhat Şahin in the mixed team event at the 2021 Islamic Solidarity Games in Konya, Turkey.

In 2022, she took two silver medals, in the individual and the mixed team events, of the ISSF Grand Prix Shotgun Konya. She placed 4th in the individual event, and 8th in the mixed team event of the 2022 Mediterranean Games in Oran, Algeria.

She represented her country at the 10th leg of the 2023 ISSF World Cup in Almaty, Kazakhstan placing 8th. At the 2023 European Games in Wrocław, Poland, she was not able to qualify for the finals. In September 2023, she won the gold medal at the Victory Cup in Eskişehir, Turkey. She set a new national record with 122 hits and another record with 54 points in the same competition.

== Personal life ==
Nur Banu Özpak was born to Müjdat and Berrin Özpak, in Karatay district of Konya Province, Turkey on 21 January 1996. On 21 February 2022, she married Ahmet Balkancı, and took her spouse's surname.

She studied Physical Education at Selçuk University in Konya.
