= Amber Rutter =

English sport shooter (born 1997)

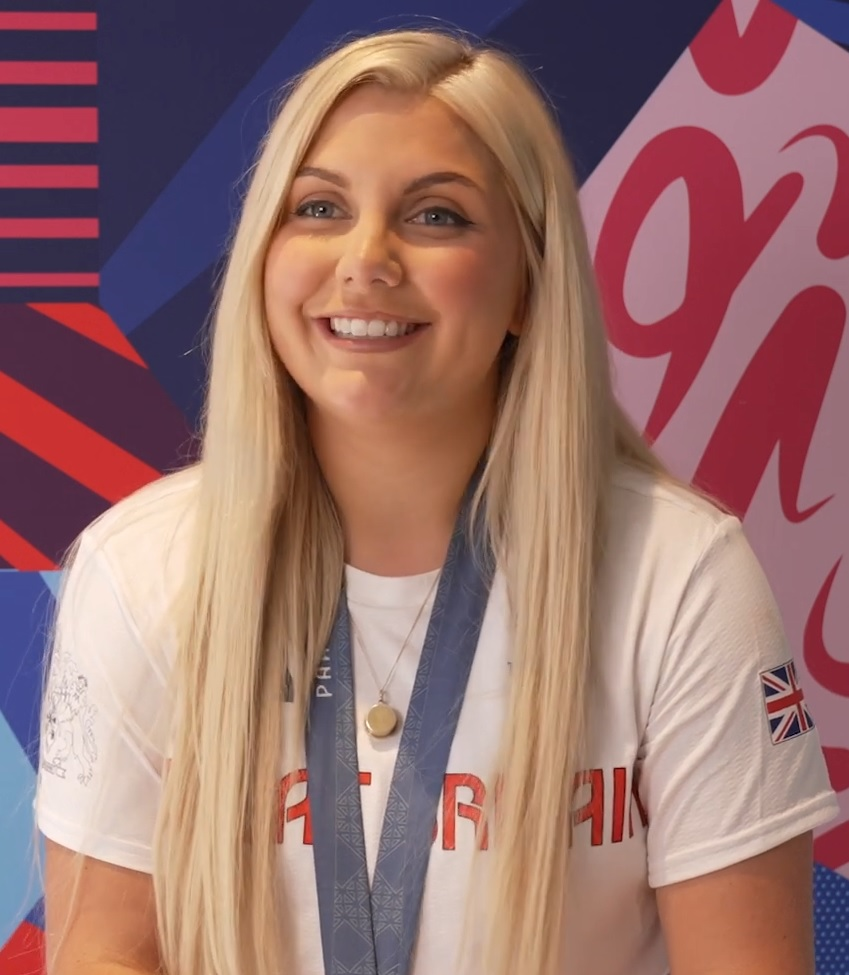
- Hill at the 2024 Summer Olympics

Personal information
- Full name: Amber Jo Rutter
- National team: Great Britain
- Born: Amber Jo Hill; 21 August 1997 (age 29) Windsor, Berkshire, England
- Height: 1.57 m (5 ft 2 in)
- Spouse: James Rutter

Sport
- Country: United Kingdom
- Sport: Shooting
- Event: Skeet (SK125)
- Club: E.J. Churchill Shooting Ground
- Coached by: Joe Neville
Medal record
Women's shooting
Representing Great Britain
Olympic Games
Silver medal – second place	2024 Paris	Skeet
World Championships
Gold medal – first place	2014 Granada	Team skeet
Gold medal – first place	2022 Osijek	Mixed team skeet
Silver medal – second place	2013 Peru	Team skeet
Silver medal – second place	2022 Osijek	Skeet
Silver medal – second place	2026 Doha	Team skeet
Bronze medal – third place	2023 Baku	Mixed team skeet
European Games
Gold medal – first place	2015 Baku	Skeet
Bronze medal – third place	2023 Kraków-Małopolska	Mixed team skeet
European Championships
Gold medal – first place	2022 Larnaca	Skeet
Gold medal – first place	2022 Larnaca	Mixed team skeet
Gold medal – first place	2022 Larnaca	Team skeet
Gold medal – first place	2023 Osijek	Mixed team skeet
Gold medal – first place	2026 Athens	Skeet
Silver medal – second place	2013 Suhl	Team skeet
Silver medal – second place	2025 Chateauroux	Skeet
Silver medal – second place	2026 Athens	Skeet team
Bronze medal – third place	2014 Sarlóspuszta	Team skeet
Bronze medal – third place	2015 Maribor	Team skeet
Bronze medal – third place	2019 Lonato del Garda	Mixed team skeet
Bronze medal – third place	2021 Osijek	Skeet
Bronze medal – third place	2023 Osijek	Skeet
Bronze medal – third place	2023 Osijek	Team skeet
Representing England
Commonwealth Games
Silver medal – second place	2018 Gold Coast	Skeet
Commonwealth Championships
Gold medal – first place	2017 Brisbane	Skeet

Amber Jo Rutter (née Hill, born 21 August 1997) is an English sport shooter who specialises in skeet. She has won a total of three gold medals in a major international competition, spanning the ISSF World Cup series (2013 and 2015), and the inaugural European Games held in Baku, Azerbaijan. She also finished with a silver medal at the 2024 Summer Olympics in the women's skeet event. A member of the GB team, Hill trains with her personal coach Joe Neville at E.J. Churchill Shooting Ground in Wycombe. Since her withdrawal from the 2020 Olympics, she has been active in promoting mental health in sport.

== Biography ==
Hill began shooting at the age of ten when she decided to go to the firing range in Binfield with the encouragement of her grandfather, Bill Rogers. Since then, she has taken part in small shooting competitions across Berkshire, earning numerous age group titles and records for shotgun. By the age of twelve, Hill had been selected to England's senior women's team with a speciality in skeet shooting.

In 2013, Hill made shooting history by becoming the sport's youngest ever winner (aged 15) at the ISSF World Cup series. She prevailed over Italy's Diana Bacosi in a shoot-off 15 clays to 11 to secure a gold medal and establish a junior world record at her very first career attempt. Because of her noteworthy success and talent in the sport, Hill finished the season as the top-ranked senior for Great Britain and the world ranked number five in the leaderboard. She had also been named the BBC's Young Sports Personality of the Year.

At the 2015 European Games in Baku, Azerbaijan, Hill beat her Italian rival Bacosi in a lengthy, tense 30-clay shoot-off to claim the top spot on the podium in the women's skeet. By winning the gold on her senior international debut, Hill gained another Olympic quota place for Great Britain. A few months later she added another title to her career treasury at the World Cup Final in Nicosia, Cyprus, outclassing Thailand's Sutiya Jiewchaloemmit with a score of 15 to 13 hits.

Amber Hill competed for Team GB's shooting squad in the women's skeet at the 2016 Summer Olympics in Rio de Janeiro. She was selected for England's squad for the 2018 Commonwealth Games which was held at the Gold Coast, Australia, in April 2018. Hill was selected for Team GB's shooting squad in the women's skeet at the 2020 Summer Olympics, but had to withdraw after testing positive for COVID-19.

In July 2022, Hill became the most successful Briton in ISSF World Cup events when she won the silver medal at the 2022 World Cup in Changwon, South Korea. This was her 11th World Cup medal surpassing the 10 of Richard Faulds.

At the 2024 Olympics, she participated in the women's skeet event and finished in silver under controversial conditions. During the fourth round of a tiebreaking shoot-off with Francisca Crovetto, one of her shots was called a miss; however, upon slow motion review, replays showed that the shot hit the target.

== Personal life ==
In February 2023, Hill married motocross racer James Rutter. In October 2023, Rutter announced she was expecting her first child, a son named Tommy, in April 2024. It was reported in March 2024 that she still intended to compete at the 2024 Summer Olympics in Paris later in the year.
