= Lucie Anastassiou =

French sport shooter (born 1993)

Personal information
- Born: 10 January 1993 (age 33) La Rochelle, France

Sport
- Country: France
- Sport: Sport shooting
- Event: Skeet
Medal record
Women's shooting
Representing France
World Championships
Bronze medal – third place	2022 Osijek	Mixed skeet team
European Games
Silver medal – second place	2019 Minsk	Skeet
Bronze medal – third place	2015 Baku	Mixed team skeet
European Championships
Gold medal – first place	2017 Baku	Skeet
Gold medal – first place	2017 Baku	Mixed team skeet
Gold medal – first place	2018 Leobersdorf	Mixed team skeet
Gold medal – first place	2024 Lonato	Mixed team skeet
Gold medal – first place	2025 Chateauroux	Skeet
Silver medal – second place	2016 Lonato del Garda	Mixed team skeet
Silver medal – second place	2018 Leobersdorf	Skeet
Silver medal – second place	2019 Lonato del Garda	Mixed team skeet
Silver medal – second place	2024 Lonato	Skeet

Lucie Anastassiou (born 10 January 1993) is a French sport shooter. She won the silver medal in the women's skeet event at the 2019 European Games held in Minsk, Belarus. In 2015, she won, alongside Anthony Terras, the bronze medal in the mixed skeet at the European Games held in Baku, Azerbaijan.

She represented France at the 2020 Summer Olympics in Tokyo, Japan.
