= Aleksandra Jarmolińska =

Polish sports shooter (born 1990)

Personal information
- Born: 6 September 1990 (age 36) Warsaw, Poland
- Height: 160 cm (5 ft 3 in)

Sport
- Sport: Sports shooting

Aleksandra Jarmolińska (born 6 September 1990) is a Polish sports shooter. She competed in the women's skeet event at the 2016 Summer Olympics. She came out as lesbian shortly before the 2020 Summer Olympic Games. She announced her plan to get married in Denmark after the Olympics.
