= Marjut Heinonen =

Finnish sport shooter (born 1976)

Personal information
- Nationality: Finland
- Born: 28 October 1976 (age 49) Trollhättan, Sweden
- Height: 1.62 m (5 ft 4 in)
- Weight: 77 kg (170 lb)

Sport
- Sport: Shooting
- Event: Skeet
- Club: Haapaveden Ampumaseura
- Coached by: Rauli Honka

Marjut Heinonen (born October 28, 1976, in Trollhättan, Sweden) is a Finnish sport shooter. At age thirty-one, Heinonen made her official debut for the 2008 Summer Olympics in Beijing, where she competed in women's skeet shooting. She placed seventeenth in the qualifying rounds of the event, with a total score of 61 points.

Heinonen currently resides in Haapavesi, Finland, where she trains full-time at Haapaveden Ampumaseura, under her personal coach Rauli Honka.
