= Melisa Gil =

Argentine sports shooter (born 1984)

Personal information
- Born: 9 August 1984 (age 41) Buenos Aires, Argentina
- Height: 160 cm (5 ft 3 in)
- Weight: 65 kg (143 lb)

Sport
- Country: Argentina
- Sport: Sports shooting
Medal record
Representing Argentina
Pan American Games
Silver medal – second place	2003 Santo Domingo	Skeet
Silver medal – second place	2015 Toronto	Skeet
Bronze medal – third place	2007 Rio de Janeiro	Skeet
Bronze medal – third place	2011 Guadalajara	Skeet

Melisa Gil (born 9 August 1984) is an Argentine sports shooter. She competed in the women's skeet event at the 2016 Summer Olympics where she placed eighth. She qualified to represent Argentina again at the 2020 Summer Olympics in the women's skeet event.

She is the sister of Federico Gil.
