= Christine Wenzel =

German sport shooter (born 1981)

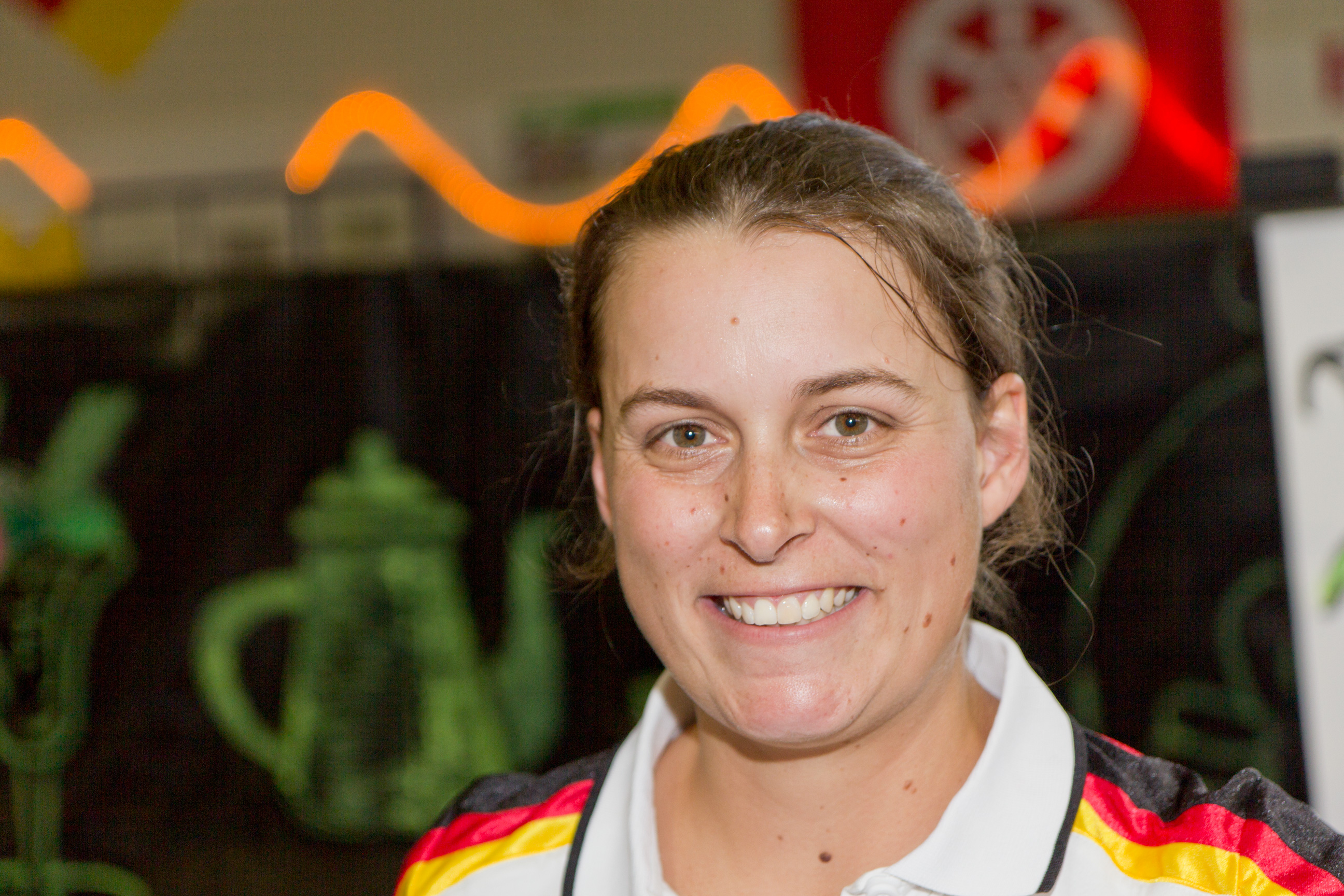
- Wenzel in 2012

Medal record

Women's shooting

Representing Germany

Olympic Games
Bronze medal – third place	2008 Beijing	Skeet

World Championships
Gold medal – first place	2007 Nicosia	Skeet
Gold medal – first place	2009 Maribor	Skeet
Gold medal – first place	2011 Belgrade	Skeet
Gold medal – first place	2013 Lima	Skeet

Christine Wenzel (née Brinker on 10 July 1981 in Ibbenbüren) is a German skeet shooter. A four-time world champion, she started shooting in 2000 and is competing for German club SSC Schale under the guidance of Wilhelm Metelmann. She won the bronze in the women's skeet at the 2008 Olympic Games. At the 2012 Games, she again reached the final, finishing in 6th place.
