= Andri Eleftheriou =

Cypriot sport shooter (born 1984)

Personal information
- Nationality: Cypriot
- Born: 19 June 1984 (age 42) Limassol, Cyprus
- Height: 1.68 m (5 ft 6 in)
- Weight: 55 kg (121 lb)

Sport
- Country: Cyprus
- Sport: Shooting
- Event: Skeet
- Club: Limassol Shooting Club
- Turned pro: 2008

Achievements and titles
- World finals: 2 times World Cup winner, 1 time World Championships 3rd place, 2 times European Championship 2nd place, 2 times Commonwealth Champion, multiple medalist at World Cups
- Highest world ranking: 3rd
Medal record
Women's shooting
Representing Cyprus
World Championships
Bronze medal – third place	2018 Changwon	Skeet team
Commonwealth Games
Gold medal – first place	2018 Gold Coast	Skeet
Gold medal – first place	2006 Melbourne	Skeet individual
Silver medal – second place	2006 Melbourne	Skeet pairs
Bronze medal – third place	2014 Glasgow	Skeet

Andri Eleftheriou (Greek: Άντρη Ελευθερίου; born 19 June 1984) is a Cypriot sport shooter, and a member of the women's national shooting team of Cyprus.

Eleftheriou was born in Limassol. In 2006, she won the skeet shooting gold medal at the Melbourne Commonwealth Games. She has also won silver at the 2006 ISSF World Cup in Germany, gold at the 2007 World Cup in Belgrade, Gold at the 2008 World Cup final in Minsk, and placed seventh in the 2008 Olympic Games in Beijing. She won a bronze medal at the 2014 Commonwealth Games in the skeet event and a gold medal at the 2018 Commonwealth Games in the skeet event. She is openly lesbian.

Olympic Games
Preceded by Pavlos Kontides	Flagbearer for Cyprus (with Pavlos Kontides); Tokyo 2020	Succeeded by Incumbent
