= ISSF Olympic trap =

Variant of trap shooting

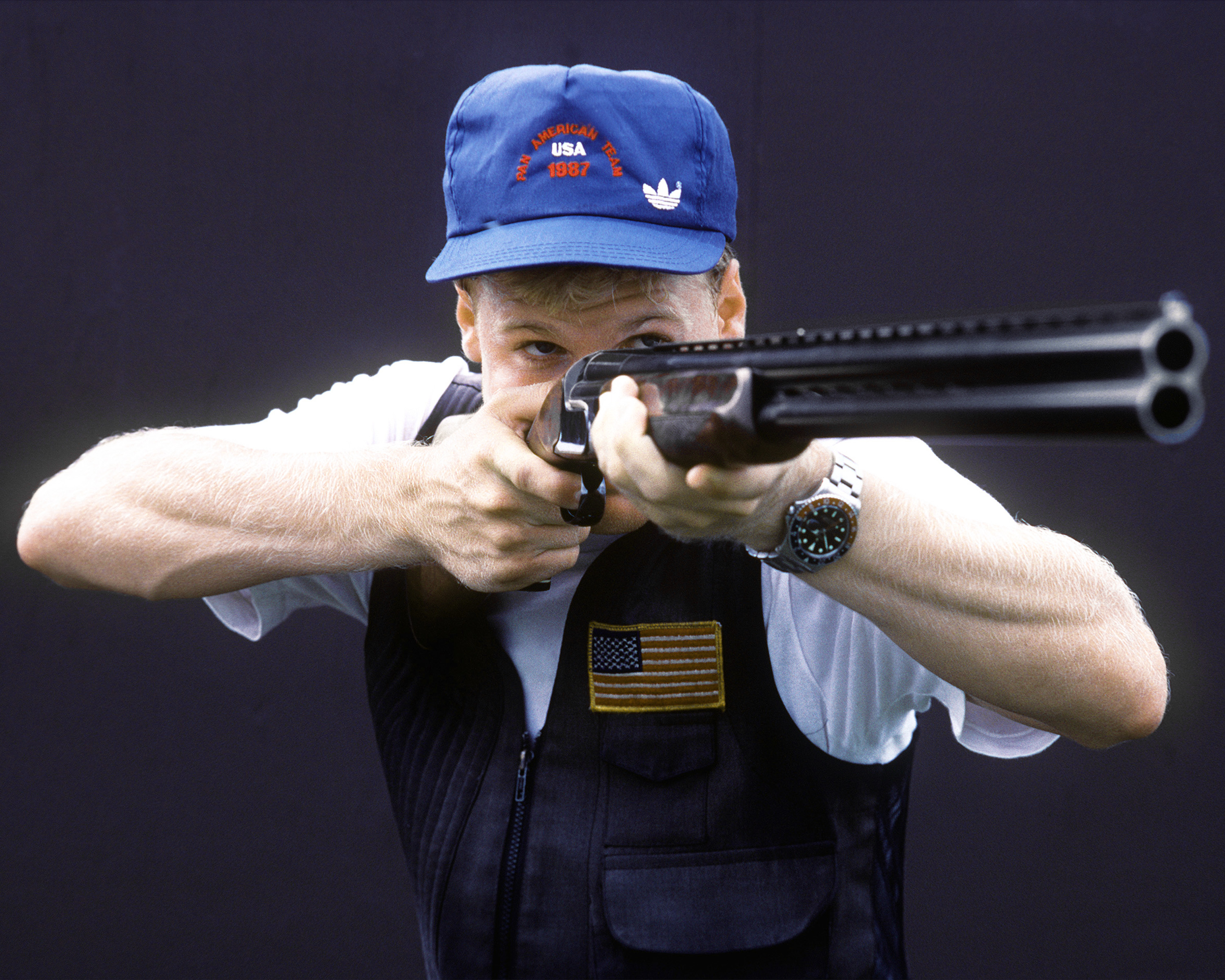

Men
- Number of targets: 125 + 50
- Olympic Games: Since 1900
- World Championships: Since 1929
- Abbreviation: TR125

Women
- Number of targets: 125 + 50
- Olympic Games: Since 2000
- World Championships: Since 1962
- Abbreviation: TR125W

Mixed Team
- Number of targets: 150 (75 each) + 50
- Olympic Games: Beginning 2020
- World Championships: Since 2017
- Abbreviation: TRMIX

Olympic trap is a shooting sports discipline contested at the Olympic Games and sanctioned by the International Shooting Sport Federation. Usually referred to simply as "trap", the discipline is also known in the United States as international trap, bunker trap, trench or international clay pigeon. It is considered more difficult than most other trap versions in that the distance to the targets and the speed with which they are thrown are both greater.

Until 1992, the Olympic trap event was open to both men and women. In 1996, it was open to men only; since 2000, men and women have had separate competitions.

The course of fire is 125 targets in the qualification round for both men and women since 2018. In 2005, the final rules were changed so that only one shot could be taken at each target instead of two in the qualification round. The competitors use 12-bore or smaller shotguns. All types of smoothbore shotguns, excluding semi-automatics and pump action shotguns, may be used, provided their caliber does not exceed 12 gauge.

== Olympic Games ==
Until 1992, trap was open to both men and women. In 1996, there was no women's trap event, and since 2000, women and men have had separate events in the Olympics.

=== Mixed / Men's trap ===
Year	Place	Gold	Silver	Bronze
1900	(France) Paris	Roger de Barbarin (FRA)	René Guyot (FRA)	Justinien de Clary (FRA)
1908	(United Kingdom) London	Walter Ewing (CAN)	George Beattie (CAN)	Alexander Maunder (GBR)
1912	(Sweden) Stockholm	James Graham (USA)	Alfred Goeldel (GER)	Harry Blau (RUS)
1920	(Belgium) Antwerp	Mark Arie (USA)	Frank Troeh (USA)	Frank Wright (USA)
1924	(France) Paris	Gyula Halasy (HUN)	Konrad Huber (FIN)	Frank Hughes (USA)
1952	(Finland) Helsinki	George Genereux (CAN)	Knut Holmqvist (SWE)	Hans Liljedahl (SWE)
1956	(Australia) Melbourne	Galliano Rossini (ITA)	Adam Smelczyński (POL)	Alessandro Ciceri (ITA)
1960	(Italy) Rome	Ion Dumitrescu (ROU)	Galliano Rossini (ITA)	Sergei Kalinin (URS)
1964	(Japan) Tokyo	Ennio Mattarelli (ITA)	Pāvels Seničevs (URS)	William Morris (USA)
1968	Mexico City	Bob Braithwaite (GBR)	Thomas Garrigus (USA)	Kurt Czekalla (GDR)
1972	(West Germany) Munich	Angelo Scalzone (ITA)	Michel Carrega (FRA)	Silvano Basagni (ITA)
1976	(Canada) Montreal	Donald Haldeman (USA)	Armando Marques (POR)	Ubaldesco Baldi (ITA)
1980	(Soviet Union) Moscow	Luciano Giovannetti (ITA)	Rustam Yambulatov (URS)	Jörg Damme (GDR)
1984	(United States) Los Angeles	Luciano Giovannetti (ITA)	Francisco Boza (PER)	Daniel Carlisle (USA)
1988	(South Korea) Seoul	Dmitry Monakov (URS)	Miloslav Bednařík (TCH)	Frans Peeters (BEL)
1992	(Spain) Barcelona	Petr Hrdlička (TCH)	Kazumi Watanabe (JPN)	Marco Venturini (ITA)
1996	(United States) Atlanta	Michael Diamond (AUS)	Josh Lakatos (USA)	Lance Bade (USA)
2000	(Australia) Sydney	Michael Diamond (AUS)	Ian Peel (GBR)	Giovanni Pellielo (ITA)
2004	(Greece) Athens	Aleksey Alipov (RUS)	Giovanni Pellielo (ITA)	Adam Vella (AUS)
2008	(China) Beijing	David Kostelecký (CZE)	Giovanni Pellielo (ITA)	Aleksey Alipov (RUS)
2012	(United Kingdom) London	Giovanni Cernogoraz (CRO)	Massimo Fabbrizi (ITA)	Fehaid Al-Deehani (KUW)
2016	(Brazil) Rio de Janeiro	Josip Glasnović (CRO)	Giovanni Pellielo (ITA)	Edward Ling (GBR)
2020	(Japan) Tokyo	Jiří Lipták (CZE)	David Kostelecký (CZE)	Matthew Coward-Holley (GBR)
2024	(France) Paris	Nathan Hales (GBR)	Qi Ying (CHN)	Jean Pierre Brol (GUA)

=== Women's trap ===
Year	Place	Gold	Silver	Bronze
2000	(Australia) Sydney	Daina Gudzinevičiūtė (LTU)	Delphine Racinet (FRA)	Gao E (CHN)
2004	(Greece) Athens	Suzanne Balogh (AUS)	María Quintanal (ESP)	Lee Bo-na (KOR)
2008	(China) Beijing	Satu Mäkelä-Nummela (FIN)	Zuzana Štefečeková (SVK)	Corey Cogdell (USA)
2012	(United Kingdom) London	Jessica Rossi (ITA)	Zuzana Štefečeková (SVK)	Delphine Réau (FRA)
2016	(Brazil) Rio de Janeiro	Catherine Skinner (AUS)	Natalie Rooney (NZL)	Corey Cogdell (USA)
2020	(Japan) Tokyo	Zuzana Rehák-Štefečeková (SVK)	Kayle Browning (USA)	Alessandra Perilli (SMR)
2024	(France) Paris	Adriana Ruano Oliva (GUA)	Silvana Maria Stanco (ITA)	Penny Smith (AUS)

=== Mixed trap team ===
Mixed trap team only took place for the 2020 Summer Olympics before being replaced by Mixed skeet team

Year	Place	Gold	Silver	Bronze
2020	(Japan) Tokyo	(Spain) Spain; Fátima Gálvez; Alberto Fernández	(San Marino) San Marino; Alessandra Perilli; Gian Marco Berti	(United States) United States; Madelynn Bernau; Brian Burrows

== World Championships, Men ==
Year	Place	Gold	Silver	Bronze
1929	(Sweden) Stockholm	Sándor Lumniczer (HUN)	Fredric Landelius P. (SWE)	Helmuth Keller (GER)
1930	(Italy) Rome	Mark Peter Arie (USA)	Helmuth Keller (GER)	Sándor Lumniczer (HUN); Kurt Schöbel (GER)
1931	(Poland) Lvov	Józef Kiszkurno (POL)	Sándor Lumniczer (HUN)	August Baumgartner (AUT)
1933	(Austria) Vienna	Sándor Lumniczer (HUN)	Pal Dora (HUN)	Sándor Dora (HUN)
1934	(Hungary) Budapest	András Montagh (HUN)	Jean de Beaumont (FRA)	Kurt Schöbel (GER)
1935	(Belgium) Brussels	Rudolf Sack (GER)	Sándor Lumniczer (HUN)	Ludo Sheid (BEL)
1936	(Germany) Berlin	Józef Kiszkurno (POL)	Gyula Halasy Dr. (HUN)	Kurt Schöbel (GER)
1937	(Finland) Helsinki	Konrad Walentin Huber (FIN)	Ake Afforselles (FIN)	Sándor Lumniczer (HUN)
1938	(Czechoslovakia) Luhačovice	István Strassburger (HUN)	Hocke (TCH)	Józef Kiszkurno (POL)
1939	(Germany) Berlin	Sándor Lumniczer (HUN)	(Germany) Hermann von dem Bongart	Adolfo Manfredi (ITA)
1947	(Sweden) Stockholm	Hans Liljedahl (SWE)	Klas Kleberg (SWE)	Seif Allah Ghaleb (EGY)
1949	(Argentina) Buenos Aires	Fulvio Rocchi (ARG)	Klas Kleberg (SWE)	Ivar Borg (SWE)
1950	(Spain) Madrid	Carlo Sala (ITA)	Italo Bellini (ITA)	Giulio Prati (ITA)
1952	(Norway) Oslo	Pablo Grossi (ARG)	George Genereux (CAN)	Knut Holmqvist (SWE)
1954	(Venezuela) Caracas	Cesare Merlo (ITA)	Galliano Rossini (ITA)	Hans Aasnaes (NOR)
1958	(Soviet Union) Moscow	Francis Eisenlauer (USA)	Galliano Rossini (ITA)	Edoardo Casciano (ITA)
1959	(Egypt) Cairo	Hussam El-Badrawi (EGY)	Edoardo Casciano (ITA)	Galliano Rossini (ITA)
1961	(Norway) Oslo	Ennio Mattarelli (ITA)	Francis Eisenlauer (USA)	Ion Dumitrescu (ROM)
1962	(Egypt) Cairo	Vladimir Zimenko (URS)	Karni Singh (IND)	Joachim Marscheider (GDR)
1965	(Chile) Santiago	Juan Enrique Lira (CHI)	Jürgen Henke (GDR)	William Abbott (USA)
1966	(West Germany) Wiesbaden	Ken Jones (USA)	Gheorghe Enache (ROM)	Pavel Senichev (URS)
1967	(Italy) Bologna	Guy Renard (BEL)	Richard Loffelmacher (USA)	Adam Smelczyński (POL)
1969	(Spain) San Sebastian	Ennio Mattarelli (ITA)	Jürgen Henke (GDR)	James Beck (USA)
1970	(United States) Phoenix	Michel Carrega (FRA)	Jean-Jacques Baud (FRA)	Larry Stafford (USA)
1971	(Italy) Bologna	Michel Carrega (FRA)	Jürgen Henke (GDR)	Gheorghe Florescu (ROM)
1973	(Australia) Melbourne	Aleksandr Androshkin (URS)	Hugh Bowie (USA)	Ennio Mattarelli (ITA)
1974	(Switzerland) Bern	Michel Carrega (FRA)	Giorgio Rosatti (ITA)	Silvano Basagni (ITA)
1975	(West Germany) Munich	John Primrose (CAN)	Alexander Alipov (URS)	Charvin Dixon (USA)
1977	(France) Antibes	Esteban Azcue Larranaga (ESP)	Armando Marques Da Silva (POR)	Carlo Danna (ITA)
1978	(South Korea) Seoul	Eladio Vallduvi (ESP)	Silvano Basagni (ITA)	James Ellis (AUS)
1979	(Italy) Montecatini Terme	Michel Carrega (FRA)	Aleksandr Asanov (URS)	Angelo Alberto Giani (ITA)
1981	(Argentina) Tucuman	Aleksandr Asanov (URS)	James Ellis (AUS)	Eladio Vallduvi (ESP)
1982	(Venezuela) Caracas	Luciano Giovannetti (ITA); Eladio Vallduvi (ESP)		Daniele Cioni (ITA)
1983	(Canada) Edmonton	John Primrose (CAN)	Daniel Carlisle (USA)	Aleksandr Asanov (URS)
1985	(Italy) Montecatini Terme	Miloslav Bednařík (TCH)	Daniele Cioni (ITA)	Oleksandr Lavrinenko (URS)
1986	(East Germany) Suhl	Miloslav Bednařík (TCH)	Jörg Damme (GDR)	Daniele Cioni (ITA)
1987	(Venezuela) Valencia	Dmytro Monakov (URS)	João Rebelo (POR)	Oleksandr Lavrinenko (URS)
1989	(Italy) Montecatini Terme	Marco Venturini (ITA)	Pavel Senichev (URS)	Albano Pera (ITA)
1990	(Soviet Union) Moscow	Jörg Damme (GDR)	Daniele Cioni (ITA)	Marco Venturini (ITA)
1991	(Australia) Perth	Marco Venturini (ITA)	Michael Diamond (AUS)	Jörg Damme (GER)
1993	(Spain) Barcelona	Marco Venturini (ITA)	Giovanni Pellielo (ITA)	José Bladas (ESP)
1994	(Italy) Fagnano	Dmytro Monakov (UKR)	Christophe Vicard (FRA)	Lance Bade (USA)
1995	(Cyprus) Nicosia	Giovanni Pellielo (ITA)	Michael Diamond (AUS)	Francesco Amici (SMR)
1997	(Peru) Lima	Giovanni Pellielo (ITA)	José Silva (POR)	Roberto Scalzone (ITA)
1998	(Spain) Barcelona	Giovanni Pellielo (ITA)	Lance Bade (USA)	Marco Venturini (ITA)
1999	(Finland) Tampere	Michael Diamond (AUS)	Aleksey Alipov (RUS)	Manuel Silva (POR)
2001	(Egypt) Cairo	Michael Diamond (AUS)	Bret Erickson (USA)	Pavel Gurkin (RUS)
2002	(Finland) Lahti	Khaled Almudhaf (KUW)	Michael Diamond (AUS)	Giovanni Pellielo (ITA)
2003	(Cyprus) Nicosia	Karsten Bindrich (GER)	Giovanni Pellielo (ITA)	Aleksey Alipov (RUS)
2005	(Italy) Lonato	Massimo Fabbrizi (ITA)	Massimiliano Mola (ITA)	Josip Glasnović (CRO)
2006	(Croatia) Zagreb	Manavjit Singh Sandhu (IND)	Erminio Frasca (ITA)	Bret Erickson (USA)
2007	(Cyprus) Nicosia	Michael Diamond (AUS)	Philip Murphy (IRL)	Karsten Bindrich (GER)
2009	(Slovenia) Maribor	Marián Kovačócy (SVK)	Massimo Fabbrizi (ITA)	Oğuzhan Tüzün (TUR)
2010	(Germany) Munich	Alberto Fernández (SPA)	Aleksey Alipov (RUS)	Jiří Lipták (CZE)
2011	(Serbia) Belgrade	Massimo Fabbrizi (ITA)	David Kostelecký (CZE)	Stéphane Clamens (FRA)
2013	(Peru) Lima	Giovanni Pellielo (ITA)	Anton Glasnović (CRO)	Aleksey Alipov (RUS)
2014	(Spain) Granada	Erik Varga (SVK)	Edward Ling (GBR)	Giovanni Pellielo (ITA)
2015	(Italy) Lonato	Erik Varga (SVK)	Giovanni Pellielo (ITA)	Maxime Mottet (BEL)
2017	(Russia) Moscow	Daniele Resca (ITA)	Edward Ling (GBR)	Jiří Lipták (CZE)
2018	(South Korea) Changwon	Alberto Fernández (ESP)	Erik Varga (SVK)	Abdulrahman Al-Faihan (KUW)
2019	(Italy) Lonato	Matthew Coward-Holley (GBR)	Mauro De Filippis (ITA)	Khaled Al-Mudhaf (KUW)
2022	(Croatia) Osijek	Derrick Mein (USA)	Nathan Hales (GBR)	Yang Kun-pi (TPE)
2023	(Azerbaijan) Baku	Giovanni Cernogoraz (CRO)	Marián Kovačócy (SVK)	Khaled Al-Mudhaf (KUW)

== World Championships, Men Team ==
Year	Place	Gold	Silver	Bronze
1929	(Sweden) Stockholm	(Hungary) Hungary; Sándor Dora; Pal Dora; Sándor Lumniczer; István Strassburger	(Finland) Finland; Ake Afforselles; Werner Ekman; Robert Waldemar Huber; Konrad Walentin Huber	(Germany) Germany; Helmuth Keller; L. Schivy; Rudolf Sack; Sierslorpff
1931	(Poland) Lvov	(Austria) Austria; August Baumgartner; O. Czernin; H. Mühlbauer; András Montagh	(Hungary) Hungary; Sándor Dora; Pal Dora; Sándor Lumniczer; Konstantyn Lyszkowski	(Poland) Poland; Tadeusz Baranski; Baranowski; Józef Kiszkurno
1933	(Austria) Vienna	(Hungary) Hungary; Pal Dora; Sándor Dora; Sándor Lumniczer; András Montagh	Denmark	Austria
1934	(Hungary) Budapest	(Hungary) Hungary; Sándor Lumniczer; Pal Dora; András Montagh; István Strassburger	Germany	Denmark
1935	(Belgium) Brussels	(Hungary) Hungary; Pal Dora; Sándor Dora; Sándor Lumniczer; István Strassburger	Belgium	Germany
1936	(Germany) Berlin	(Hungary) Hungary; Sándor Dora; Gyula Halasy; Sándor Lumniczer; István Strassburger	Germany	(United Kingdom) Great Britain
1937	(Finland) Helsinki	(Finland) Finland; Ake Afforselles; Werner Ekman; W. Heinonen; Konrad Walentin Huber	(Germany) Germany; Rudolf Sack; Kurt Schöbel von Gramon; Hermann Josef von dem Bongart	(Sweden) Sweden; T. Adlers; Axel Ekblom; Klas Kleberg; G. Lundgren
1938	(Czechoslovakia) Luhačovice	(Poland) Poland; Józef Kiszkurno; Wilhelm Ziegenhirte; Konstantyn Lyszkowski; Stefan Sztukowski	Czechoslovakia	(Hungary) Hungary; Sándor Dora; Sándor Lumniczer; Ladislaus Szapary; István Strassburger
1939	(Germany) Berlin	Germany Hermann Josef von dem Bongart Kurt Schöbel	Italy	(Hungary) Hungary; Sándor Dora; Sándor Lumniczer; István Strassburger; Ladislaus Szapary
1947	(Sweden) Stockholm	(Sweden) Sweden; N. Högfeldt; Klas Kleberg; Hans Liljedahl; Carl Palmstierna	(Egypt) Egypt; Seifullah Ghaleb; F. Makarius; Mohamed Labib; S. Shahin	(Finland) Finland; Werner Ekman de Prado A. Konrad Walentin Huber; Sven-Erik Theodor Rosenlew
1949	(Argentina) Buenos Aires	(Argentina) Argentina; Leon Bozzi; Juan de Giacomi; Juan Angel Martini Tronconi; Fulvio Rocchi	(Sweden) Sweden; Ivar Borg; Klas Kleberg; Hans Liljedahl; Carl Palmstierna	(Uruguay) Uruguay; L. Malugani; H. Barrera; J. Nocetti; F. Fleurguin
1950	(Spain) Madrid	(Italy) Italy; Carlo Sala; Italo Bellini; Giulio Prati; Giacomo Prati	(Greece) Greece; Jean Coutzis; Manfredi; George Coutzis; Lynardakis	(Spain) Spain; Mascort Amigo; Serrahima; Sarasqueta; Rafael Juan Garcia
1952	(Norway) Oslo	(Sweden) Sweden; Alwen C. Knut Holmqvist; Hans Liljedahl; Carl Palmstierna	(Egypt) Egypt; Seifullah Ghaleb; Youssef Fares; Marabouti M. S. Shahin	(Italy) Italy; Italo Bellini; Crocco A. Adolfo Manfredi; Galliano Rossini
1954	(Venezuela) Caracas	(Italy) Italy; Raffaele de Donato; Cesare Merlo; Galliano Rossini; Guglielmo Tuccimei	(Sweden) Sweden; K. Alwen; C. Alwen; Knut Holmqvist; Bengt Malmgren	(Egypt) Egypt; S. A. Chaleb; M. Badraur; M. el Senoussi; A. Riad
1958	(Soviet Union) Moscow	(Soviet Union) Soviet Union; Sergei Kalinin; Yury Nikandrov; Valentin Styepin; Vladimir Zimenko	(Italy) Italy; Edoardo Casciano; Alessandro Ciceri; Daniele Ciceri; Galliano Rossini	(United States) United States; H. Clark; W. Everhart; Francis Eisenlauer; E. Session
1959	(Egypt) Cairo	Italy	Lebanon	Egypt
1962	(Egypt) Cairo	(Soviet Union) Soviet Union; Sergei Kalinin; Yury Nikandrov; Pavel Senichev; Vladimir Zimenko	(East Germany) East Germany; Gerhard Assmus; Joachim Marscheider; Karl Heinz Kramer; Heinz Rehder	(Egypt) Egypt; Hussam El Badrawi; C. Bidair; Mohamed Chahin Mehrez; Y. Saleh
1966	(West Germany) Wiesbaden	(United States) United States; Billy Hicks; Gordon Horner; Charles Jenson; Ken Jones	(Romania) Romania; Ion Dumitrescu; Gheorghe Florescu; Gheorghe Enache; Popovici S.	(Soviet Union) Soviet Union; Aleksandr Alipov; Yury Nikandrov; Pavel Senichev; Vladimir Zimenko
1967	(Italy) Bologna	(Italy) Italy; Silvano Basagni; Ennio Mattarelli; Angelo Scalzone; Galliano Rossini	(United States) United States; James Beck; Chris Bishop; Billy Hicks; Richard Loffelmacher	(Soviet Union) Soviet Union; Aleksandr Alipov; Karlo Daraseliya; Yury Kostylev; Pavel Senichev
1969	(Spain) San Sebastian	(Italy) Italy; Umberto Bertozzi; Alberto Giani; Ennio Mattarelli; Giorgio Rosatti	(United States) United States; James Beck; Thomas Garrigus; Howard Terry; Larry Stafford	(Egypt) Egypt; Maly; Mohamed Chahin Mehrez; Sabet; Wahdan
1970	(United States) Phoenix	(United States) United States; James Columbo; Dallas Krapf; Larry Stafford; Walter Zobell	(France) France; Jean-Jacques Baud; Pierre Candelo; Michel Carrega; Dominique Veneny	(Italy) Italy; Silvano Basagni; Ennio Mattarelli; Giorgio Rosatti; Galliano Rossini
1971	(Italy) Bologna	(West Germany) West Germany; Peter Blecher; Heinz Leibinger; Ludwig Roselius; Hubertus Underberg	(Italy) Italy; Silvano Basagni; Serafino Giani; Ennio Mattarelli; Giorgio Rosatti	(France) France; Jean-Jacques Baud; Pierre Candelo; Michel Carrega; Michel Prévost
1973	(Australia) Melbourne	(Soviet Union) Soviet Union; Aleksandr Alipov; Aleksandr Androshkin; Gennady Galkin; Peeter Vehm	(United States) United States; Hugh Bowie; Kenneth Gilbert; Frank Little; Harry Skalsky	(Australia) Australia; James Ellis; Kenneth Lowry; Douglas Smith; Peter Wray
1974	(Switzerland) Bern	(France) France; Jean-Jacques Baud; Michel Carrega; Daniel Lagarrigue; Robert Pereira	(Italy) Italy; Silvano Basagni; Alberto Carneroli; Ennio Mattarelli; Giorgio Rosatti	(United States) United States; Ken Blasi; Frank Little; James Poindexter; Walter Zobell
1975	(West Germany) Munich	(United States) United States; Daniel Carlisle; Charvin Dixon; Donald Haldeman; Walter Zobell	(Canada) Canada; Larry Ivanny; James Platz; John Primrose; Edward Wladichuk	(Spain) Spain; Esteban Azcue Larranaga; Jaime Bladas Santasusagna; Ricardo Sancho Navarro; Eladio Vallduvi Casals
1977	(France) Antibes	(Italy) Italy; Silvano Basagni; Alberto Carneroli; Carlo Danna; Angelo Alberto Giani	(Spain) Spain; Esteban Azcue Larranaga; Ricardo Sancho Navarro; Ruiz Rumoroso; Eladio Vallduvi Casals	(United States) United States; Hugh Bowie; Donald Haldeman; Frank Little; James Poindexter
1978	(South Korea) Seoul	(United States) United States; Lee Bannerman; Daniel Carlisle; Randy Voss; Walter Zobell	(Japan) Japan; Kan Numajiri; Mitsuyoshi Kodaira; Masao Obara; Kazumi Watanabe	(Spain) Spain; Luis Granados; Ricardo Sancho Navarro; Ruiz Rumoroso; Eladio Vallduvi Casals
1979	(Italy) Montecatini Terme	(Italy) Italy; Silvano Basagni; Alberto Carneroli; Luciano Giovannetti; Angelo Alberto Giani	(Soviet Union) Soviet Union; Aleksandr Asanov; Rustam Yambulatov; Sergei Okhotsky; Yury Nikandrov	(France) France; Pierre Boutin; Christian Demarle; Bernard Blondeau; Michel Carrega
1981	(Argentina) Tucuman	(Soviet Union) Soviet Union; Aleksandr Asanov; Oleksandr Lavrinenko; Sergei Okhotsky; Rustam Yambulatov	(Spain) Spain; Esteban Azcue Larranaga; Pedro Sainz; Ricardo Sancho Navarro; Eladio Vallduvi Casals	(United Kingdom) Great Britain; Peter Boden; Peter Croft; James Young; John Tennison
1982	(Venezuela) Caracas	(Italy) Italy; Silvano Basagni; Daniele Cioni; Luciano Giovannetti; Angelo Alberto Giani	(France) France; Christophe Blein; Bernard Blondeau; Michel Carrega; Patrick Mahaut	(Soviet Union) Soviet Union; Aleksandr Asanov; Oleksandr Lavrinenko; Sergei Okhotsky; Igor Semyonov
1983	(Canada) Edmonton	(United States) United States; Daniel Carlisle; Peter Piffath; Dayne Johnson	(Soviet Union) Soviet Union; Aleksandr Asanov; Oleksandr Lavrinenko; Igor Semyonov	(Australia) Australia; Graeme Boyd; James Ellis; John Maxwell
1985	(Italy) Montecatini Terme	(Italy) Italy; Silvano Basagni; Daniele Cioni; Luciano Giovannetti	(Soviet Union) Soviet Union; Aleksandr Asanov; Rustam Yambulatov; Oleksandr Lavrinenko	(Czechoslovakia) Czechoslovakia; Miloslav Bednařík; Josef Machan; Jindřich Paroubek
1986	(East Germany) Suhl	(Czechoslovakia) Czechoslovakia; Miloslav Bednařík; Josef Machan; Jindřich Paroubek	(Italy) Italy; Daniele Cioni; Luciano Giovannetti; Albano Pera	(Soviet Union) Soviet Union; Aleksandr Asanov; Oleksandr Lavrinenko; Pavel Senichev
1987	(Venezuela) Valencia	(Portugal) Portugal; Helder Cavaco; João Rebelo; José Pinto	(Soviet Union) Soviet Union; Oleksandr Lavrinenko; Dmytro Monakov; Urmas Saaliste	(United States) United States; Ken Blasi; Daniel Carlisle; George Allen Haas
1989	(Italy) Montecatini Terme	(Italy) Italy; Daniele Cioni; Albano Pera; Marco Venturini	(Hungary) Hungary; Zoltan Bodo; Karoly Gombos; Istvan Putz	(Portugal) Portugal; Antonio Marques; João Rebelo; Luis Tinoco
1990	(Soviet Union) Moscow	(Italy) Italy; Daniele Cioni; Albano Pera; Marco Venturini	(Portugal) Portugal; Antonio Marques; João Rebelo; Manuel Silva	(East Germany) East Germany; Jörg Damme; Thomas Fichtner; Ralf Rehberg
1991	(Australia) Perth	(United States) United States; Richard Chordash; Bret Erickson; Jay Waldron	(United Kingdom) Great Britain; Peter Boden; Peter Croft; Kevin Gill	(Spain) Spain; José Bladas; Rafael Axpe; Juan Torne
1993	(Spain) Barcelona	(Italy) Italy; Giovanni Pellielo; Roberto Scalzone; Marco Venturini	(Spain) Spain; José Bladas; Pedro Martin; José Luis Perez	(Germany) Germany; Jörg Damme; Olaf Kirchstein; Uwe Möller
1994	(Italy) Fagnano	(Italy) Italy; Giovanni Pellielo; Roberto Scalzone; Marco Venturini	(Portugal) Portugal; João Rebelo; Luis Pereira; Manuel Silva	(Germany) Germany; Karsten Bindrich; Jörg Damme; Björn Hille
1995	(Cyprus) Nicosia	(Italy) Italy; Giovanni Pellielo; Marcello Tittarelli; Marco Venturini	(Australia) Australia; Michael Diamond; Russell Mark; Filippo Petriella	(United States) United States; Brian Ballard; Lance Bade; Joshua Lakatos
1997	(Peru) Lima	(Italy) Italy; Giovanni Pellielo; Roberto Scalzone; Rodolfo Vigano	(Portugal) Portugal; João Rebelo; José Silva; Manuel Silva	(Australia) Australia; Benjamin Kelley; Russell Mark; Adam Vella
1998	(Spain) Barcelona	(Italy) Italy; Marco Venturini; Marcello Tittarelli; Giovanni Pellielo	(United States) United States; Dominic Grazioli; James Graves; Lance Bade	(Portugal) Portugal; José Silva; João Rebelo; Luis Pereira
1999	(Finland) Tampere	(Australia) Australia; Michael Diamond; Russell Mark; Glenn Kable	(Russia) Russia; Aleksey Alipov; Sergey Lyubomirov; Igor Chebanov	(United States) United States; Dominic Grazioli; Matthew Depuydt; Lance Bade
2001	(Egypt) Cairo	(Australia) Australia; Michael Diamond; Benjamin Kelley; Nathan Cassells	(United States) United States; Bret Erickson; Joshua Lakatos; Lance Bade	(Russia) Russia; Pavel Gurkin; Aleksey Alipov; Ivan Derevsky
2002	(Finland) Lahti	(Republic of Ireland) Ireland; Derek Burnett; David Malone; Philip Murphy	(Australia) Australia; Michael Diamond; Russell Mark; Adam Vella	(Finland) Finland; Tommi Andelin; Ville Laitinen; Petri Nummela
2003	(Cyprus) Nicosia	(Russia) Russia; Aleksey Alipov; Maksim Kosarev; Igor Chebanov	(Italy) Italy; Giovanni Pellielo; Marco Venturini; Massimo Fabbrizi	(Slovakia) Slovakia; Vladimír Slamka; Mário Filipovič; Roman Čavara
2005	(Italy) Lonato	(Italy) Italy; Massimiliano Mola; Massimo Fabbrizi; Giovanni Pellielo	(Australia) Australia; Thomas Turner; Michael Diamond; Adam Vella	(France) France; Stéphane Clamens; Jean-Pierre Chavassieux; Yves Tronc
2006	(Croatia) Zagreb	(Russia) Russia; Pavel Gurkin; Aleksey Alipov; Maksim Kosarev	(India) India; Manavjit Singh Sandhu; Mansher Singh; Anwer Sultan	(United States) United States; Bret Erickson; Matthew Wallace; Lance Bade
2007	(Cyprus) Nicosia	(Kuwait) Kuwait; Khaled Almudhaf; Naser Meqlad; Abdulrahman Al-Faihan	(Italy) Italy; Giovanni Pellielo; Erminio Frasca; Massimo Fabbrizi	(Republic of Ireland) Ireland; Philip Murphy; Derek Burnett; David Malone
2009	(Slovenia) Maribor	(Italy) Italy; Massimo Fabbrizi; Erminio Frasca; Giovanni Pellielo	(Slovakia) Slovakia; Marián Kovačócy; Erik Varga; Mário Filipovič	(Czech Republic) Czech Republic; David Kostelecký; Robin Daněk; Jiří Lipták
2010	(Germany) Munich	(Italy) Italy; Giovanni Pellielo; Erminio Frasca; Massimo Fabbrizi	(China) China; Yajun Li; Chonglun Sun; Xiaokai Yu	(San Marino) San Marino; Stefano Selva; Manuel Mancini; Francesco Amici
2011	(Serbia) Belgrade	(Italy) Italy; Massimo Fabbrizi; Giovanni Pellielo; Rodolfo Vigano	(Czech Republic) Czech Republic; David Kostelecký; Jiří Gach; Jiří Lipták	(United Kingdom) Great Britain; Aaron Heading; Edward Ling; Carl Exton
2013	(Peru) Lima	(Spain) Spain; Alberto Fernandez; Jesus Serrano; Antonio Bailon	(Portugal) Portugal; Jose Manuel Bruno Faria; Ricardo Colaco; Joao Azevedo	(Croatia) Croatia; Anton Glasnovic; Giovanni Cernogoraz; Sasa Sedmak
2014	(Spain) Granada	(Italy) Italy; Giovanni Pellielo; Valerio Grazini; Massimo Fabbrizi	(Kuwait) Kuwait; Fehaid Aldeehani; Talal Alrashidi; Abdulrahman Al-Faihan	(Czech Republic) Czech Republic; Jiří Lipták; David Kostelecký; Robin Daněk
2015	(Italy) Lonato	(Russia) Russia; Alexey Alipov; Maksim Smykov; Denis Zotov	(Italy) Italy; Giovanni Pellielo; Massimo Fabbrizi; Valerio Grazini	(San Marino) San Marino; Stefano Selva; Gian Marco Berti; Manuel Mancini
2017	(Russia) Moscow	(Italy) Italy; Daniele Resca; Valerio Grazini; Giovanni Pellielo	(Czech Republic) Czech Republic; Jiří Lipták; David Kostelecký; Vladimír Štěpán	(Spain) Spain; Alberto Fernandez; Antonio Bailon; Jose Luis Rodriguez Uris
2018	(South Korea) Changwon	(Kuwait) Kuwait; Abdulrahman Al-Faihan; Talal Alrashidi; Khaled Almudhaf	(United States) United States; Glenn Eller; Grayson Davey; Casey Wallace	(Italy) Italy; Mauro De Filippis; Giovanni Pellielo; Valerio Grazini
2019	(Italy) Lonato del Garda	(Italy) Italy; Mauro De Filippis; Valerio Grazini; Giovanni Pellielo	(Kuwait) Kuwait; Khaled Al-Mudhaf; Abdulrahman Al-Faihan; Talal Al-Rashidi	(United Kingdom) Great Britain; Matthew Coward-Holley; Nathan Hales; Aaron Heading
2022	(Croatia) Osijek	(United Kingdom) Great Britain; Aaron Heading; Matthew Coward-Holley; Nathan Hales	(Czech Republic) Czech Republic; Jiří Lipták; Vladimír Štěpán; David Kostelecký	(Italy) Italy; Mauro De Filippis; Marco Correzzola; Lorenzo Ferrari
2023	(Azerbaijan) Baku	(United States) United States; William Hinton; Derrick Mein; Derek Haldeman	(Italy) Italy; Giovanni Pellielo; Massimo Fabbrizi; Daniele Resca	(Czech Republic) Czech Republic; Jiří Lipták; Pavel Vaněk; David Kostelecký

== World Championships, Women ==
Year	Place	Gold	Silver	Bronze
1962	(Egypt) Cairo	Valentina Gerasina (URS)	Charlotte Berkenkamp (USA)	Sheila Breckon (GBR)
1966	(West Germany) Wiesbaden	Elisabeth von Soden (FRG)	Charlotte Berkenkamp (USA)	Valentina Gerasina (URS)
1967	(Italy) Bologna	Elisabeth von Soden (FRG)	Valentina Gerasina (URS)	Vera Verigina (URS)
1969	(Spain) San Sebastian	Bina Avrile Guiducci (ITA)	Elisabeth von Soden (FRG)	Valentina Gerasina (URS)
1970	(United States) Phoenix	Julia Sidorova (URS)	Bina Avrile Guiducci (ITA)	Valentina Gerasina (URS)
1971	(Italy) Bologna	Galina Khomutova (URS)	Susan Nattrass (CAN)	Nuria Ortiz (MEX)
1974	(Switzerland) Bern	Susan Nattrass (CAN)	Audrey Grosch (USA)	Francoise Robrolle (FRA)
1975	(West Germany) Munich	Susan Nattrass (CAN)	Elisabeth von Soden (FRG)	Natalia Ukolova (URS)
1977	(France) Antibes	Susan Nattrass (CAN)	Audrey Grosch (USA)	Wanda Gentiletti (ITA)
1978	(South Korea) Seoul	Susan Nattrass (CAN)	Wanda Gentiletti (ITA)	Maria Carmen Garcia de Cubas (ESP)
1979	(Italy) Montecatini Terme	Susan Nattrass (CAN)	Julia Klekova (URS)	Larisa Tushkina (URS)
1981	(Argentina) Tucuman	Susan Nattrass (CAN)	Mauricette Colavito (FRA)	Frances Strodtman (USA)
1982	(Venezuela) Caracas	Maria Carmen Garcia de Cubas (ESP)	Susan Nattrass (CAN)	Elena Shishirina (URS)
1983	(Canada) Edmonton	Connie Tomsovic (USA)	Elena Shishirina (URS)	Susan Nattrass (CAN)
1985	(Italy) Montecatini Terme	Li Li (CHN)	Elena Shishirina (URS)	Frances Strodtman (USA)
1986	(East Germany) Suhl	Gao E (CHN)	Elena Shishirina (URS)	Susan Nattrass (CAN)
1987	(Venezuela) Valencia	Weiping Yin (CHN)	Gao E (CHN)	Satu Pusila (FIN)
1989	(Italy) Montecatini Terme	Elena Shishirina (URS)	Gema Usieto (ESP)	Muriel Bernard (FRA)
1990	(Soviet Union) Moscow	Pia Baldisserri (ITA)	Roberta Pelosi (ITA)	Yujin Wang (CHN)
1991	(Australia) Perth	Gema Usieto (ESP)	Susan Nattrass (CAN)	Roberta Pelosi (ITA)
1993	(Spain) Barcelona	Gema Usieto (ESP)	Deena Julin (USA)	Gao E (CHN)
1994	(Italy) Fagnano	Paola Tattini (ITA)	Deena Julin (USA)	Denise Morrison (USA)
1995	(Cyprus) Nicosia	Frances Strodtman (USA)	Deena Julin (USA)	Satu Makela (FIN)
1997	(Peru) Lima	Elena Shishirina (RUS)	Gema Usieto (ESP)	Deserie Wakefield-Baynes (AUS)
1998	(Spain) Barcelona	Satu Pusila (FIN)	Susanne Kiermayer (GER)	Hua Guo (CHN)
1999	(Finland) Tampere	Cindy Gentry (USA)	Satu Pusila (FIN)	Delphine Racinet (FRA)
2001	(Egypt) Cairo	Irina Laricheva (RUS)	Susan Nattrass (CAN)	Gao E (CHN)
2002	(Finland) Lahti	Elena Tkach (RUS)	Daina Gudzinevičiūtė (LTU)	Yujin Wang (CHN)
2003	(Cyprus) Nicosia	Victoria Chuyko (UKR)	Roberta Pelosi (ITA)	Zuzana Štefečeková (SVK)
2005	(Italy) Lonato	Deborah Gelisio (ITA)	Irina Laricheva (RUS)	Susan Nattrass (CAN)
2006	(Croatia) Zagreb	Susan Nattrass (CAN)	Li Chen (CHN)	Hye Gyong Chae (PRK)
2007	(Cyprus) Nicosia	Yingzi Liu (CHN)	Deborah Gelisio (ITA)	Daniela Del Din (SMR)
2009	(Slovenia) Maribor	Jessica Rossi (ITA)	Irina Laricheva (RUS)	Satu Mäkelä-Nummela (FIN)
2010	(Germany) Munich	Zuzana Štefečeková (SVK)	Yingzi Liu (CHN)	Jessica Rossi (ITA)
2011	(Serbia) Belgrade	Yingzi Liu (CHN)	Zuzana Štefečeková (SVK)	Elena Tkach (RUS)
2013	(Peru) Lima	Jessica Rossi (ITA)	Yukie Nakayama (JPN)	Elena Tkach (RUS)
2014	(Spain) Granada	Katrin Quooss (GER)	Fatima Galvez (ESP)	Catherine Skinner (AUS)
2015	(Italy) Lonato	Fátima Gálvez (ESP)	Elena Tkach (RUS)	Yong Hui Pak (PRK)
2017	(Russia) Moscow	Jessica Rossi (ITA)	Catherine Skinner (AUS)	Zuzana Štefečeková (SVK)
2018	(South Korea) Changwon	Zuzana Štefečeková (SVK)	Xiaojing Wang (CHN)	Silvana Stanco (ITA)
2019	(Italy) Lonato del Garda	Ashley Carroll (USA)	Xiaojing Wang (CHN)	Fátima Gálvez (ESP)
2022	(Croatia) Osijek	Carole Cormenier (FRA)	Fátima Gálvez (ESP)	Zuzana Štefečeková (SVK)
2023	(Azerbaijan) Baku	Lin Yi-chun (TPE)	Jessica Rossi (ITA)	Kathrin Murche (GER)

== World Championships, Women Team ==
Year	Place	Gold	Silver	Bronze
1975	(West Germany) Munich	(Soviet Union) Soviet Union; Valentina Gerasina; Julia Klekova; Natalia Ukolova	(West Germany) West Germany; Marlene Caspary; Beate Roselius; Elisabeth von Soden	(United States) United States; Audrey Grosch; Kathleen Sedleczky; Frances Strodtman
1977	(France) Antibes	(Italy) Italy; Bina Avrile Guiducci; Wanda Gentiletti; Elda Rolandi	(United States) United States; Audrey Grosch; Loral Delaney; Frances Strodtman	(Spain) Spain; Maria Carmen Garcia de Cubas; Maria Pilar Gonzalez de Rionda; Teresa de Llaurador
1978	(South Korea) Seoul	(Italy) Italy; Wanda Gentiletti; Bina Avrile Guiducci; Bianca Rosa Hansberg	(Spain) Spain; Maria Carmen Garcia de Cubas; Maria Pilar Gonzalez de Rionda; Maria Teresa Munoz	(United States) United States; Loral Delaney; Audrey Grosch; Valeria Johnson
1979	(Italy) Montecatini Terme	(Soviet Union) Soviet Union; Larisa Tushkina; Valentina Hlebnikova; Julia Klekova	(Italy) Italy; Bina Avrile Guiducci; Wanda Gentiletti; Elda Rolandi	(United States) United States; Hoyle C. Valeria Johnson; Frances Strodtman
1981	(Argentina) Tucuman	(Spain) Spain; Maria Carmen Garcia de Cubas; Maria Pilar Gonzalez de Rionda; Maria Teresa Munoz	(United States) United States; Audrey Grosch; Glenda Stark; Frances Strodtman	
1982	(Venezuela) Caracas	(United States) United States; Carol Mc Clure; Frances Strodtman; Connie Tomsovic	(Spain) Spain; Maria Carmen Garcia de Cubas; Maria Teresa Munoz; Maria Dolores Palazon Hurtado	(China) China; Gao E Li Li; Yali Xu
1983	(Canada) Edmonton	(United States) United States; Loral Delaney; Frances Strodtman; Connie Tomsovic	(Spain) Spain; Maria Carmen Garcia de Cubas; Maria Pilar Gonzalez de Rionda; Maria Dolores Palazon Hurtado	(China) China; Gao E Li Li; Yali Xu
1985	(Italy) Montecatini Terme	(China) China; Gao E Li Li; Yujin Wang	(Italy) Italy; Paola Tattini; Pia Baldisserri; Wanda Gentiletti	(Canada) Canada; Susan Nattrass; Anne Mc Garvey; Lisa Salt
1986	(East Germany) Suhl	(Soviet Union) Soviet Union; Svetlana Lazareva; Marina Michailova; Elena Shishirina	(China) China; Gao E Li Li; Weiping Yin	(Italy) Italy; Wanda Gentiletti; Roberta Morara; Pia Baldisserri
1989	(Italy) Montecatini Terme	(Soviet Union) Soviet Union; Daina Gudzinevičiūtė; Svetlana Lazareva; Elena Shishirina	(Spain) Spain; Maria Dolores Palazon Hurtado; María Quintanal; Gema Usieto	(China) China; Gao E Ruizhen Lu; Weiping Yin
1990	(Soviet Union) Moscow	(Italy) Italy; Paola Tattini; Pia Baldisserri; Roberta Pelosi	(Soviet Union) Soviet Union; Maya Gubieva; Irina Laricheva; Elena Shishirina	(China) China; Ruizhen Lu; Yujin Wang; Weiping Yin
1991	(Australia) Perth	(China) China; Li Li; Yujin Wang; Weiping Yin	(Soviet Union) Soviet Union; Victoria Chuyko; Elena Shishirina; Elena Tkach	(France) France; Muriel Bernard; Mauricette Colavito; Gisele Renaud
1993	(Spain) Barcelona	(China) China; Gao E Yujin Wang; Weiping Yin	(Germany) Germany; Silke Huesing; Susanne Kiermayer; Petra Knetemann	(Spain) Spain; Maria Dolores Palazon Hurtado; Mari Luz Terol; Gema Usieto
1994	(Italy) Fagnano	(Italy) Italy; Emanuela Caponi; Roberta Pelosi; Paola Tattini	(United States) United States; Deena Julin; Denise Morrison; Theresa Wentzel	(Germany) Germany; Silke Huesing; Susanne Kiermayer; Petra Knetemann
1995	(Cyprus) Nicosia	(United States) United States; Deena Julin; Denise Morrison; Frances Strodtman	(Italy) Italy; Cristina Bocca; Roberta Pelosi; Paola Tattini	(Finland) Finland; Satu Makela; Satu Pusila; Tiina Viljanen
1997	(Peru) Lima	(Italy) Italy; Cristina Bocca; Roberta Pelosi; Paola Tattini	(United States) United States; Carolyn Koch-Paramore; Deena Mendicino; Joetta Novinski	(Russia) Russia; Irina Laricheva; Elena Shishirina; Maria Volkova
1998	(Spain) Barcelona	(China) China; Li Chen; Hua Guo; Gao E	(United States) United States; Deena Minyard; Cindy Gentry; Theresa Dewitt	(Germany) Germany; Sonja Scheibl; Silke Huesing; Susanne Kiermayer
1999	(Finland) Tampere	(China) China; Fang Han; Li Chen; Gao E	(France) France; Delphine Racinet; Gisele Renaud; Yolande Vidal	(Italy) Italy; Cristina Bocca; Giulia Iannotti; Roberta Pelosi
2001	(Egypt) Cairo	(Russia) Russia; Irina Laricheva; Elena Tkach; Maria Zub	(China) China; Gao E Hua Guo; Yingzi Liu	(Australia) Australia; Suzanne Balogh; Deserie Baynes; Nessa Jenkins
2002	(Finland) Lahti	(Russia) Russia; Irina Laricheva; Elena Tkach; Maria Zub	(Spain) Spain; Vanessa Leon; Vanesa Majuelo; María Quintanal	(China) China; Gao E Huike Ma; Yujin Wang
2003	(Cyprus) Nicosia	(Italy) Italy; Roberta Pelosi; Giulia Iannotti; Maria Sole Santasilia	(China) China; Gao E Yujin Wang; Yingzi Liu	(Spain) Spain; Vanessa Leon; María Quintanal; Vanesa Majuelo
2005	(Italy) Lonato	(Russia) Russia; Irina Laricheva; Elena Tkach; Elena Shishirina	(Italy) Italy; Deborah Gelisio; Romina Giansanti; Giulia Iannotti	(China) China; Huike Ma; Gao E Yi Wen Wang
2006	(Croatia) Zagreb	(China) China; Li Chen; Mei Zhu; Gao E	(United Kingdom) Great Britain; Lesley Goddard; Charlotte Kerwood; Shona Marshall	(Russia) Russia; Elena Tkach; Irina Laricheva; Tatiana Barsuk
2007	(Cyprus) Nicosia	(Italy) Italy; Deborah Gelisio; Giulia Iannotti; Arianna Perilli	(China) China; Yingzi Liu; Li Chen; Gao E	(Germany) Germany; Sonja Scheibl; Susanne Kiermayer; Jana Beckmann
2009	(Slovenia) Maribor	(Italy) Italy; Jessica Rossi; Deborah Gelisio; Giulia Iannotti	(United Kingdom) Great Britain; Shona Marshall; Charlotte Kerwood; Abbey Burton	(San Marino) San Marino; Alessandra Perilli; Daniela Del Din; Francesca Spadoni
2010	(Germany) Munich	(Italy) Italy; Jessica Rossi; Deborah Gelisio; Giulia Iannotti	(China) China; Yingzi Liu; Gao E Xingyu Lu	(San Marino) San Marino; Marina Santolini; Alessandra Perilli; Daniela Del Din
2011	(Serbia) Belgrade	(Russia) Russia; Elena Tkach; Irina Laricheva; Tatiana Barsuk	(France) France; Marina Sauzet; Delphine Racinet; Stephanie Neau	(China) China; Yingzi Liu; Gao E Cuicui Wu
2013	(Peru) Lima	(Italy) Italy; Jessica Rossi; Frederica Caporuscio; Silvana Stanco	(Russia) Russia; Elena Tkach; Irina Laricheva; Tatiana Barsuk	(Australia) Australia; Suzanne Balogh; Catherine Skinner; Laetisha Scanlan
2014	(Spain) Granada	(Germany) Germany; Katrin Quooss; Jana Beckmann; Christiane Goehring	(Italy) Italy; Deborah Gelisio; Jessica Rossi; Silvana Stanco	(Spain) Spain; Fatima Galvez; Eva Maria Clemente; Maria Quintanal Zubizarreta
2015	(Italy) Lonato	(United Kingdom) Great Britain; Charlotte Kerwood; Kristy Barr; Abbey Ling	(Finland) Finland; Markita Salmi; Noora Antikainen; Satu Mäkelä-Nummela	(Russia) Russia; Elena Tkach; Ekaterina Rabaya; Tatiana Barsuk
2017	(Russia) Moscow	(United States) United States; Ashley Carroll; Caitlin Barney Weinheimer; Corey Cogdell	(Finland) Finland; Markita Salmi; Satu Mäkelä-Nummela; Mopsi Veromaa	(Italy) Italy; Jessica Rossi; Silvana Stanco; Alessia Iezzi
2018	(South Korea) Changwon	(Italy) Italy; Silvana Stanco; Jessica Rossi; Alessia Iezzi	(Spain) Spain; Beatriz Martinez; Fatima Galvez; Francisca Muñoz De Leon Moral	(United States) United States; Kayle Browning; Ashley Carroll; Aeriel Skinner
2019	(Italy) Lonato del Garda	(United States) United States; Ashley Carroll; Rachel Tozier; Kayle Browning	(Russia) Russia; Iuliia Saveleva; Yulia Tugolukova; Tatiana Barsuk	(Italy) Italy; Silvana Stanco; Jessica Rossi; Maria Palmitessa
2022	(Croatia) Osijek	(Italy) Italy; Giulia Grassia; Alessia Iezzi; Jessica Rossi	(Finland) Finland; Mopsi Veromää; Noora Antikainen; Satu Makela-Nummela	(Australia) Australia; Penny Smith; Catherine Skinner; Laetisha Scanlan
2023	(Azerbaijan) Baku	(Italy) Italy; Jessica Rossi; Silvana Stanco; Maria Lucia Palmitessa	(Australia) Australia; Penny Smith; Laetisha Scanlan; Catherine Skinner	(China) China; Wu Cuicui; Li Qingnian; Zhang Xinqiu

== World Championships, Mixed Team ==
Following the 2016 Rio Olympics, the ISSF created a new event, Mixed Team Trap. The mixed team consists of one male and one female shooter. During the qualification rounds, each team is squadded with two other teams and each shooter shoots 25 targets per round, just as in the individual event. This continues for three rounds (75 targets per shooter, 150 targets per team). The finals are contested between the top 6 teams. Shooters take turns shooting five targets each (1 rotation) for five rotations (25 targets), at which time the lowest scoring is eliminated. Another team is eliminated after five additional targets until the final two teams are left. The final two teams shoot ten targets to determine a winner, for 50 targets in the finals.

The first World Championship for Mixed Team was held at the 2017 World Shotgun Championships in Moscow, RUS.

Year	Place	Gold	Silver	Bronze
2017	(Russia) Moscow	(Australia) Australia; Penny Smith; Thomas Grice	(Spain) Spain; Beatriz Martinez; Antonio Bailon	(United States) United States; Ashley Carroll; Derek Haldeman
2018	(South Korea) Changwon	(Slovakia) Slovakia; Zuzana Štefečeková; Erik Varga	(Russia) Russia; Ekaterina Rabaya; Alexey Alipov	(United Kingdom) Great Britain; Kirsty Barr; Aaron Heading
2019	(Italy) Lonato del Garda	(Australia) Australia; Laetisha Scanlan; James Willett	(Russia) Russia; Iuliia Saveleva; Maksim Smykov	(Australia) Australia; Penny Smith; Thomas Grice
2022	(Croatia) Osijek	Italy; Mauro De Filippis; Giulia Grassia	United Kingdom; Nathan Hales; Lucy Hall	Australia; James Willett; Laetisha Scanlan Slovenia; Boštjan Maček; Jasmina Maček
2023	(Azerbaijan) Baku	Portugal; Maria Ines Coelho de Barros; João Azevedo	United States; Rachel Tozier; Derrick Mein	Kazakhstan; Mariya Dmitriyenko; Daniel Pochivalov

== Junior World Championships, Men ==
Year	Place	Gold	Silver	Bronze
1989	(Italy) Montecatini	Michael Diamond (AUS)	Manuel Silva (POR)	Carlo Angelantoni (ITA)
1991	(Australia) Perth	Julian Womble (GBR)	Lance Bade (USA)	Karsten Bindrich (GER)
1993	(Spain) Barcelona	Joshua Lakatos (USA)	Adriano Lamera (ITA)	Ricardo Queiros (POR)
1994	(Italy) Fagnano	Erik Varga (SVK)	Martin Davies (USA)	Yiannis Christofi (CYP)
1995	(Cyprus) Nicosia	David Kostelecký (CZE)	Martin Davies (USA)	Benjamin Kelley (AUS)
1997	(Peru) Lima	Nathan Cassells (AUS)	Rafael Garcia (ESP)	Matthew Depuydt (USA)
1998	(Spain) Barcelona	Raul Formoso (ESP)	Mariano Guarnieri (ARG)	Manuel Murica (ESP)
1999	(Finland) Tampere	Oguzhan Tuzun (TUR)	Abel Ampudia (ESP)	Victor Shaw (NZL)
2001	(Egypt) Cairo	Marián Kovačócy (SVK)	Ville Laitinen (FIN)	Anton Glasnović (CRO)
2002	(Finland) Lahti	Edward Ling (GBR)	Oguzhan Tuzun (TUR)	Giovanni Cernogoraz (CRO)
2003	(Cyprus) Nicosia	Erminio Frasca (ITA)	Joao Azevedo (POR)	Carl Exton (GBR)
2005	(Italy) Lonato	Marco Panizza (ITA)	Bradley Davis (GBR)	Julien Meunier (FRA)
2006	(Croatia) Zagreb	Abdulrahman Al-Faihan (KUW)	Carl Exton (GBR)	Daniele Resca (ITA)
2007	(Cyprus) Nicosia	Valerio Vallifuoco (ITA)	Saud Meqlad (KUW)	Yavuz Ilnam (TUR)
2009	(Slovenia) Maribor	Valerio Grazini (ITA)	Paco Mechado (ESP)	Daniel Wiesemann (GER)
2010	(Germany) Munich	Danny Baiesi (ITA)	Július Vass (SVK)	Giulio Fioravanti (ITA)
2011	(Serbia) Belgrade	Talal Alrashidi (KUW)	Allan Jack Norwood (NZL)	Maksim Smykov (RUS)
2013	(Peru) Lima	Nicolás Pacheco (PER)	Pavel Vaněk (CZE)	Daniel Adrian Games Tarrant (GBR)
2014	(Spain) Granada	Ian O'Sullivan (IRL)	Jack Wallace (AUS)	Nathan Hales (GBR)
2015	(Italy) Lonato	Filip Praj (SVK)	Luca Miotto (ITA)	Adrián Drobný (SVK)
2017	(Russia) Moscow	Clement Francis Andre Bourgue (FRA)	Matteo Marongiu (ITA)	Jack Wallace (AUS)
2018	(South Korea) Changwon	Nathan Argiro (AUS)	Logan Lucas (USA)	Lorenzo Ferrari (ITA)
2019	(Italy) Lonato del Garda	Leonardo Lustoza (BRA)	Matias Koivu (FIN)	Rene Maček (SLO)

== Junior World Championships, Women ==
Year	Place	Gold	Silver	Bronze
1999	(Finland) Tampere	Mopsi Veromaa (FIN)	Lacy Holtz (USA)	Sonja Scheibl (GER)
2001	(Egypt) Cairo	Angelique Psarakis (AUS)	Nihan Gurer (TUR)	Collyn Loper (USA)
2002	(Finland) Lahti	Dongni Sun (CHN)	Tatiana Barsuk (RUS)	Zuzana Štefečeková (SVK)
2003	(Cyprus) Nicosia	Amanda Dorman (USA)	Simone Tigani (AUS)	Tatiana Barsuk (RUS)
2005	(Italy) Lonato	Fatima Galvez (ESP)	Abbey Burton (GBR)	Susan Sledge (USA)
2006	(Croatia) Zagreb	Wen Qin (CHN)	Marina Sauzet (FRA)	Emma Eagles (USA)
2007	(Cyprus) Nicosia	Jessica Rossi (ITA)	Abbey Burton (GBR)	Ray Bassil (LIB)
2009	(Slovenia) Maribor	Qiuwen Qi (CHN)	Tian Xu (CHN)	Tachel Yardy (GBR)
2010	(Germany) Munich	Miranda Wilder (USA)	Catherine Skinner (AUS)	Rachael Lynn Heiden (USA)
2011	(Serbia) Belgrade	Janessa Jo Beaman (USA)	Safiye Sariturk (TUR)	Kelly Coogan (AUS)
2013	(Peru) Lima	Miranda Wilder (USA)	Svetlana Krasheninnikova (RUS)	Alessia Iezzi (ITA)
2014	(Spain) Granada	Yulia Tugolukova (RUS)	Valeria Raffaelli (ITA)	Serdag Saadet Kandira (TUR)
2015	(Italy) Lonato	Alessia Iezzi (ITA)	Yulia Tugolukova (RUS)	Ellie Roditis (USA)
2017	(Russia) Moscow	Maria Lucia Palmitessa (ITA)	Iuliia Saveleva (RUS)	Diana Ghilarducci (ITA)
2018	(South Korea) Changwon	Erica Sessa (ITA)	Manisha Keer (IND)	Daria Semianova (RUS)
2019	(Italy) Lonato del Garda	Selin Ali (BUL)	Tatiana Saranskaia (RUS)	Zina Hrdličková (CZE)

== Junior World Championships, Mixed Team ==
Year	Place	Gold	Silver	Bronze
2018	(South Korea) Changwon	(Italy) Italy; Erica Sessa; Lorenzo Ferrari	(Italy) Italy; Maria Lucia Palmitessa; Matteo Marongiu	(China) China; Wendi Gao; Yiliu Ouyang
2019	(Italy) Lonato del Garda	(Czech Republic) Czech Republic; Zina Hrdličková; Fabio Beccari	(Italy) Italy; Gaia Ragazzini; Matteo Marongiu	(Bulgaria) Bulgaria; Selin Ali; Ivan Georgiev

== World Championships, total medals ==
Rank	Nation	Gold	Silver	Bronze	Total
1	Italy	44	31	21	96
2	United States	16	25	19	60
3	Soviet Union	16	13	15	44
4	China	10	6	12	28
5	Hungary	10	6	5	21
6	Canada	9	6	4	19
7	Slovakia	9	4	4	17
8	Russia	8	4	5	17
9	Spain	7	10	10	27
10	Australia	5	8	6	19
11	France	5	7	7	19
12	Germany	3	7	14	24
13	Sweden	3	5	3	11
14	Finland	3	3	6	12
15	West Germany	3	3	0	6
16	Czechoslovakia	3	2	1	6
17	Poland	3	0	3	6
18	Argentina	3	0	0	3
19	Portugal	2	6	3	11
20	Kuwait	2	0	1	3
21	Ukraine	2	0	0	2
22	East Germany	1	5	2	8
23	Egypt	1	2	5	8
24	India	1	2	0	3
25	Belgium	1	1	1	3
25	Ireland	1	1	1	3
27	Austria	1	0	2	3
28	Croatia	1	0	1	2
29	Chile	1	0	0	1
29	Chinese Taipei	1	0	0	1
31	Great Britain	0	3	3	6
32	Romania	0	2	2	4
33	Denmark	0	1	1	2
34	Greece	0	1	0	1
34	Japan	0	1	0	1
34	Lebanon	0	1	0	1
34	Lithuania	0	1	0	1
38	San Marino	0	0	3	3
39	Czech Republic	0	0	2	2
40	Kazakhstan	0	0	1	1
40	Mexico	0	0	1	1
40	North Korea	0	0	1	1
40	Norway	0	0	1	1
40	Turkey	0	0	1	1
40	Uruguay	0	0	1	1
Totals (45 entries)		175	167	168	510

== Current world records ==
Current world records in trap as of July 12, 2026
Men	Qualification	125	Giovanni Pellielo (ITA); Ray Ycong (USA); Marcello Tittarelli (ITA); Lance Bade (USA); Pavel Gurkin (RUS); David Kostelecký (CZE); Massimo Fabbrizi (ITA); Massimo Fabbrizi (ITA); Michael Diamond (AUS); Giovanni Pellielo (ITA); Casey Wallace (USA); Jean Pierre Brol Cardenas (GUA); James Willett (AUS); Josip Glasnovic (CRO); Jiří Lipták (CZE); Sebastien Guerrero (FRA); Anton Glasnović (CRO)	April 1, 1994; June 9, 1995; June 11, 1996; July 23, 1998; August 10, 2005; October 5, 2006; May 15, 2009; September 6, 2011; August 6, 2012; April 18, 2013; October 16, 2014; August 15, 2015; March 19, 2019; April 9, 2019; June 2, 2021; September 24, 2023; October 17, 2025	Nicosia (CYP); Lahti (FIN); Suhl (GER); Barcelona (ESP); Americana (BRA); Granada (ESP); Munich (GER); Belgrade (SRB); London (ENG); Al Ain (UAE); Guadalajara (MEX); Qabala (AZE); Guadalajara (MEX); Al Ain (UAE); Osijek (CRO); Osijek (CRO); Athens (GRE)
Men	Final	30	Erminio Frasca (ITA)	July 11, 2026	Lonato (ITA)
Men	Teams	371	Italy (De Filippis, Pellielo, Fabbrizi)	September 24, 2023	Osijek (CRO)
Junior Men	Qualification	124	Khaled Almudhaf (KUW); Ilya Vinogradov (RUS); Matteo Dambrosi (ITA); Hussein Daruich (BRA)	May 14, 1998; August 5, 2011; May 12, 2022; June 24, 2026	Atlanta (USA); Belgrade (SRB); Suhl (GER); Suhl (GER)
Junior Men	Final	28	Thomas Agez (FRA); Francesco Tanfoglio (ITA)	June 24, 2026	Cairo (EGY); Suhl (GER)
Junior Men	Teams	364	Italy (Grazini, Mancarella, Fioravanti)	August 5, 2011	Belgrade (SRB)
Women	Qualification	125	Zuzana Rehák-Štefečeková (SVK)	July 29, 2021	Tokyo (JPN)
Women	Final	30	Penny Smith (AUS)	May 9, 2026	Almaty (KAZ)
Women	Teams	357	China (Wu, Zhang, Li)	October 1, 2023	Hangzhou (CHN)
Junior Women	Qualification	121	Maria Lucia Palmitessa (ITA)	September 3, 2018	Changwon (KOR)
Junior Women	Qualification	121	Kseniia Stepina (AIN)	May 25, 2025	Suhl (GER)
Junior Women	Final	28	Valentina Archetti (ITA)	June 24, 2026	Suhl (GER)
Junior Women	Teams	352	Italy (Palmitessa, Sessa, Littame)	September 3, 2018	Changwon (KOR)
Mixed Team	Qualification	149	Kayle Browning (USA); Brian Burrows (USA) Safiye Sariturk (TUR); Nedim Tolga Tuncer (TUR) Penny Smith (AUS); Mitchell Iles-Crevatin (AUS)	March 20, 2019 March 20, 2019 March 20, 2019	Guadalajara (MEX) Guadalajara (MEX) Guadalajara (MEX)
Mixed Team	Final	30	Catherine Skinner (AUS); James Willett (AUS)	July 12, 2026	Lonato (ITA)
Junior Mixed Team	Qualification	145	Sofia Littame (ITA); Samuele Faustinelli (ITA)	October 7, 2021	Lima (PER)
Junior Mixed Team	Final	35	Maria Iovinella (ITA); Francesco Tanfoglio (ITA)	June 25, 2026	Suhl (GER)

== See also ==
- ISSF shooting events
- ISSF Olympic skeet
- Double trap
