= 1985 World Shotgun Championships =

- Host city: Montecatini Terme, Italy
- Level: Senior
- Events: 53

The 1985 World Shotgun Championships was the 17th edition of the global shooting competition World Shotgun Championships, organised by the International Shooting Sport Federation.

== Results ==
=== Men ===
==== Trap ====
Evento	Gold		Silver		Bronze	
Evento	Athlete	Results	Athlete	Results	Athlete	Results
Individual	(Czechoslovakia) Miroslav Bednařík	197	(Italy) Daniele Cioni	196	(Soviet Union) Aleksandr Lavrinenko	194
Team	Italy; Silvano Basagni; Daniele Cioni; Luciano Giovannetti	434	Soviet Union; Aleksandr Asanov; Rustam Yambulatov; Aleksandr Lavrinenko	428	Czechoslovakia; Miroslav Bednařík; Josef Machan; Jindrich Paroubek	428

==== Skeet ====
Evento	Gold		Silver		Bronze	
Evento	Athlete	Results	Athlete	Results	Athlete	Results
Individual	(East Germany) Bernhard Hochwald	196	(North Korea) Sin Nam-Ho	195	(Sweden) Björn Thorwaldson	195
Team	United States; Dean Clark; Joseph Dickson; Michael Schmidt	433	Italy; Andrea Benelli; Celso Giardini; Luca Scribani Rossi	433	Czechoslovakia; Lubos Adamec; Bronislav Bechynsky; Stanislav Klofonda	432

=== Women ===
==== Trap ====
Evento	Gold		Silver		Bronze	
Evento	Athlete	Results	Athlete	Results	Athlete	Results
Individual	(China) Li Li	188	(Soviet Union) Elena Shishirina	182	(United States) Frances Strodtman	176
Team	China; Gao E Li Li; Yujin Wang	383	Italy; Paola Tattini; Pia Baldisserri; Wanda Gentiletti	377	Canada; Susan Nattrass; Anne Mc Garvey; Lisa Salt	366

==== Skeet ====
Evento	Gold		Silver		Bronze	
Evento	Athlete	Results	Athlete	Results	Athlete	Results
Individual	(United States) Terry Carlisle	190	(China) Liu Ling	185	(China) Shao Weiping	184
Team	China; Liu Ling; Wu Jie; Shao Weiping	412	United States; Terry Carlisle; Ellen Dryke; Eva Funes	405	Italy; Rossane Bernardini; Sonia Garagnani; Bianca Rosa Hansberg	386

== Medal table ==
#	Country	1st place, gold medalist(s)	2nd place, silver medalist(s)	3rd place, bronze medalist(s)	Tot.
1	China	3	1	1	5
2	United States	2	1	1	4
3	Italy	1	3	1	5
4	Czechoslovakia	1	0	2	3
5	East Germany	1	0	0	1
6	Soviet Union	0	2	1	3
7	North Korea	0	1	0	1
8	Canada	0	0	1	1
8	Sweden	0	0	1	1

== See also ==
- Trap World Champions
- Skeet World Champions
