= Daniele Cioni =

Italian sport shooter (1959–2021)

Personal information
- National team: Italy
- Born: 5 April 1959 Campi Bisenzio, Italy
- Died: 6 May 2021 (aged 62) Campi Bisenzio, Italy
- Height: 1.80 m (5 ft 11 in)
- Weight: 90 kg (198 lb)

Sport
- Sport: Shooting
- Event: Trap
- Start activity: 1981 (senior)
Medal record
Individual
Event	1st	2nd	3rd
World Championships	0	2	2
European Championships	3	3	0
World Cup Final	1	0	1
World Cup	4	1	1
Total	8	6	4
Team
Event	1st	2nd	3rd
World Championships	5	1	1
European Championships	1	1	1
Total	6	2	2

Daniele Cioni (5 April 1959 – 6 May 2021) was an Italian sport shooter who competed in the 1984 Summer Olympics, in the 1988 Summer Olympics, and in the 1992 Summer Olympics.

== Biography ==
Cioni won 18 medals (8 gold) at individual senior and junior level in the international championships and World Cup. His first great success was in 1982 when he was team world champion, individual bronze in Caracas, Venezuela and world record equaled in Montecatini, where he won the individual European title on the occasion and is team silver.

== Achievements ==
Year	Competition	Venue	Individual			Team			Other teammates
Year	Competition	Venue	1st place, gold medalist(s)	2nd place, silver medalist(s)	3rd place, bronze medalist(s)	1st place, gold medalist(s)	2nd place, silver medalist(s)	3rd place, bronze medalist(s)	Other teammates
1982	World Championships	(Venezuela) Caracas	0	0	1	1	0	0	Silvano Basagni, Angelo Alberto Giani, Luciano Giovannetti
1982	European Championships	(Italy) Montecatini	1	0	0	0	1	0	Luciano Giovannetti, ?
1983	European Championships	(Romania) Bucharest	0	0	0	1	0	0	Carlo Danna, Marco Vaccari
1985	World Championships	(Italy) Montecatini	0	1	0	1	0	0	Silvano Basagni, Luciano Giovannetti
1986	World Championships	(East Germany) Suhl	0	0	1	0	1	0	Silvano Basagni, Luciano Giovannetti
1986	European Championships	(Italy) Montecatini	1	0	0	0	0	0	
1989	World Championships	(Italy) Montecatini	0	0	0	1	0	0	Albano Pera, Marco Venturini
1990	World Championships	(Soviet Union) Moscow	0	1	0	1	0	1	Albano Pera, Marco Venturini
1990	European Championships	(Sweden) Uddevalla	0	0	0	1	0	0	Albano Pera, Marco Venturini

== See also ==
- Trap World Champions
- Double trap World Champions
