= Perazzi =

Italian firearms manufacturer

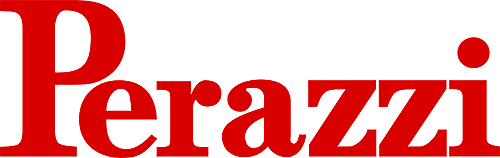
- Company type: Privately held
- Founded: 1957
- Founder: Daniele Perazzi
- Headquarters: Brescia, Italy
- Products: Custom shotguns
- Owner: Czechoslovak Group (80%)
- Number of employees: 100
- Website: www.perazzi.com

Perazzi is a manufacturer of precision shotguns from Brescia, Italy. The company sells hunting and sporting models of shotguns noted for their removable trigger groups, high quality, and high prices (US$7,500–440,000). Its founder is Daniele Perazzi, and his family owns and operates it.

The Perazzi factory is in Botticino near Brescia, Italy. The guns are made to order and the customer can visit the factory to select options and receive a custom gun fit. This is called "The Perazzi Experience". The process of purchasing a shotgun normally begins with the specification of all the metalwork first. Custom options include the gauge of the shotgun, the blank and grade of wood for the stock and forearm, barrel length and diameter, rib height and width, the trigger group, and receiver engraving. The guns can also be engraved and there are different levels of engraving quality and also side plates available. A "test gun" is used to determine the correct fit and measurements for the shotgun to be made for the customer. In the Perazzi factory there is a public viewing area of shotgun production. Customers also have the option of visiting the nearby family owned cafe/restaurant for homemade pasta and wine while their shotgun is being made.

== History ==
Daniele Perazzi was six years old when he was introduced to firearms by his uncle. Later when he was fourteen, he was hired by a local gunsmith. Before becoming an apprentice to the gunsmith, he often ran errands around town on a bicycle. Perazzi began working on his own at the age of twenty. He found his first commercial success after inventing and patenting a trigger design which he sold to other gun manufacturers. At the age of twenty five in 1957, Perazzi officially established Perazzi Armi.

In 1960, Perazzi met Ivo Fabbri, a young automotive engineer who worked for Fiat. The two joined together to create high class, yet affordable shotguns. They were inspired by the British gun makers Boss & Co. and Woodward, who made firearms by hand with extravagant prices. Perazzi and Ivo believed there was a way to create such high class firearms that would be affordable for the average Italian. The pair then began to work with Italian shooting star and gun designer, Ennio Mattarelli. From this partnership the first Olympic grade Perazzi shotgun was born, which Mattarelli used to win the gold medal in Olympic trap at the 1964 Tokyo Olympics with a world record score of 198/200 targets. A year later Fabbri separated from Perazzi to establish his own firearm company, Fabbri Arms. Perazzi continued to work with Mattarelli. The two focused on developing a new shotgun for Mattarelli to shoot at the 1968 Mexico City Olympics. The model MX8 shotgun was born, built specifically for the conditions of shooting in Mexico City. The gun featured a higher rib and respective higher stock to reduce heat distortion along the sight plane in the hot climate. Doing so lowered to the placement of the stock on the shoulder, resulting in the recoil being directed horizontally back into the shooter, rather than vertical muzzle jump. A pistol grip was included to increase the control over traditional straight English stocks. The MX8 was also one of the first guns to have interchangeable screw in chokes in the bottom barrel. This feature is now found in nearly every modern shotgun. Also included was the revolutionary detachable v-springs trigger assembly. Perazzi preferred v-springs over the traditional coil trigger assembly due to their better trigger pulls. The draw back of v-springs was their unreliability. When worn out they can break without warning, unlike the coil trigger assemblies they slowly wear down with age. Since the v-spring assembly was detachable, they could be changed at any time by the competitor for peace of mind. This innovation along with slanted hammers reduced misfires significantly.

Following Daniele Perazzi's death in 2012, his son, Mauro, and his daughter, Roberta, have taken over the business. In December 2023, Prague-based Czechoslovak Group acquired a 80% stake in the company.

== Olympic use ==
1964 Tokyo

- Ennio Mattarelli ITA. Olympic Trap. Gold. Model SHO.

1980 Moscow

- Rustam Yambulatov RUS. Olympic Trap. Silver. Model MX8.

1984 Los Angeles

- Daniel Carlisle USA. Olympic Trap. Bronze. Model MX8.

1988 Seoul

- Jorge Guardiola ESP. Olympic Skeet. Bronze. Model MX8.

1996 Atlanta

- Kim Rhode USA. Double Trap Ladies. Gold. Model MX12.
- Michael Diamond AUS. Olympic Trap. Gold. Model MX8.
- Josh Lakatos USA. Olympic Trap. Silver. Model MX10.
- Lance Bade USA. Olympic Trap. Bronze. Model MX8.

2000 Sydney

- Michael Diamond AUS. Olympic Trap. Gold. Model MX8.
- Daina Gudzineviciute LTU. Olympic Trap Ladies. Gold. Model MX8.
- Zemfira Meftakhetdinova AZE. Olympic Skeet Ladies. Gold. Model MX8.
- Deborah Gelisio ITA. Double Trap Ladies. Silver. Model MX2000/8.
- Giovanni Pellielo ITA. Olympic Trap. Silver. Model MX8.
- Fehaid Al-Deehani KUW. Double Trap. Bronze. Model MX8.
- Kim Rhode USA. Double Trap Ladies. Bronze. Model MX12.
- James Graves USA. Olympic Skeet. Bronze. Model MX8.
- Diana Igaly HUN. Olympic Skeet Ladies. Bronze. Model MX8.

2004 Athens

- Aleksey Alipov RUS. Olympic Trap. Gold. Model MX8.
- Suzanne Balogh AUS. Olympic Trap Ladies. Gold. Model MX8.
- Kim Rhode USA. Double Trap Ladies. Gold. Model MX12.
- Diana Igaly HUN. Olympic Skeet Ladies. Gold. Model SC3.
- Maria Quintanal ESP. Olympic Trap Ladies. Silver. Model MX2000/8.
- Lee Bo-na KOR. Double Trap Ladies. Silver. Model MX8.
- Rajyavardhan Singh Rathore IND. Double Trap. Silver. Model MX8.
- Marko Kemppainen FIN. Olympic Skeet. Silver. Model MX2000/8.
- Lee Bo-na KOR. Olympic Trap Ladies. Bronze. Model MX8.
- Wang Zheng CHN. Double Trap. Bronze. Model MX2000/8.
- Zemfira Meftakhetdinova AZE. Olympic Skeet Ladies. Bronze. Model MX8.
- Juan Miguel Rodriguez CUB. Olympic Skeet. Bronze. Model MX8.

2012 London

- Peter Wilson GBR. Double Trap. Gold. Model MX2005.
- Giovanni Cernogoraz CRO. Olympic Trap. Gold. Model MX2000/8.
- Kim Rhode. USA. Olympic Skeet Ladies. Gold. Model MX2000/S.
- Jessica Rossi ITA. Olympic Trap Ladies. Gold. Model MX8.
- Zuzana Stefecekova SVK. Olympic Trap Ladies. Silver. Model MX2000/3.
- Hakan Dahlby SWE. Double Trap. Silver. Model MX2008.
- Massimo Fabbrizi ITA. Olympic Trap. Silver. Model MX8.
- Anders Golding DEN. Olympic Skeet. Silver. Model MX2000/8
- Vasily Mosin RUS. Double Trap. Bronze. Model MX2008.
- Fehaid Al-Deehani KUW. Olympic Trap. Bronze. Model MX2005.
- Delphine Reau FRA. Olympic Trap Ladies. Bronze. Model MX8.
- Danka Bartekova SVK. Olympic Skeet Ladies. Bronze. Model MX8.

2016 Rio de Janeiro

- Fehaid Al-Deehani KUW. Double Trap. Gold. Model MX8.
- Steven Scott GBR. Double Trap. Bronze. Model High Tech.
- Edward Ling GBR. Olympic trap. Bronze. Model MX2000/3.

2020 Tokyo

- Zuzana Stefecekova SVK. Olympic Trap Ladies. Gold. Model High Tech 2020.
- Alberto Fernandez ESP. Olympic Trap Mixed Team. Gold. Model MX2000/8.
- Amber English USA. Olympic Skeet Ladies. Gold. Model MX8.
- David Kostelecký CZE. Olympic trap. Silver. Model High Tech 3.
- Gian Marco Berti SMR. Olympic Trap Mixed Team. Silver. Model MX8.
- Matthew Coward-Holley GBR. Olympic trap. Bronze. Model MX2000/8.
- Brian Burrows USA. Olympic Trap Mixed Team. Bronze. Model MX8.
