= Kiszkurno =

Kiszkurno is a Polish surname. Notable people with the surname include:

- Józef Kiszkurno (1895–1981), Polish sport shooter
- Zygmunt Kiszkurno (1921–2012), Polish sport shooter, son of Józef
