= Carrega =

Carrega may refer to:

- Carrega Ligure, a comune (municipality) in Alessandria, Italy
- Michel Carrega (born 1934), French trap shooter
- Baga (grape), also known as Carrega Burros
