= Alipov =

Alipov (Russian: Алипов) is a Russian masculine surname, its feminine counterpart is Alipova. It may refer to

- Aleksandr Alipov (born 1948), Russian sports shooter
- Alexey Alipov (born 1975), Russian sports shooter, son of Aleksandr
- Yuliya Alipova (born 1977), Belarusian-born Russian sport shooter, wife of Alexey
- Yulia Alipova (Miss Russia) (born 1990), Russian model
