= 1969 World Shotgun Championships =

International sport shooting competition

The 1969 World Shotgun Championships were separate ISSF World Shooting Championships for the trap and skeet events held in San Sebastián, Spain.

== Medal count ==
Rank	Nation	Gold	Silver	Bronze	Total
1	Italy (ITA)	3	0	1	4
2	Soviet Union (URS)	2	2	2	6
3	Mexico (MEX)	1	0	0	1
4	United States (USA)	0	1	2	3
5	East Germany (GDR)	0	1	0	1
5	Poland (POL)	0	1	0	1
5	West Germany (FRG)	0	1	0	1
8	Egypt (EGY)	0	0	1	1
Totals (8 entries)		6	6	6	18

== Men ==
Individual			Teams		
Trap
1st place, gold medalist(s)	Ennio Mattarelli (ITA)	192	1st place, gold medalist(s)	Italy	559
2nd place, silver medalist(s)	Jürgen Henke (GDR)	191	2nd place, silver medalist(s)	United States	555
3rd place, bronze medalist(s)	James Beck (USA)	191	3rd place, bronze medalist(s)	Egypt	538
Skeet
1st place, gold medalist(s)	Yuri Tsuranov (URS)	198	1st place, gold medalist(s)	Soviet Union	587
2nd place, silver medalist(s)	Nikolay Benesh (URS)	196	2nd place, silver medalist(s)	Poland	567
3rd place, bronze medalist(s)	Romano Garagnani (ITA)	196	3rd place, bronze medalist(s)	United States	560

== Women ==
Individual
Trap
1st place, gold medalist(s)	Bina Avrile (ITA)	129
2nd place, silver medalist(s)	Elisabeth von Soden (FRG)	123
3rd place, bronze medalist(s)	Valentina Gerasina (URS)	123
Skeet
1st place, gold medalist(s)	Nuria Ortiz (MEX)	145
2nd place, silver medalist(s)	Larisa Gurvich (URS)	142
3rd place, bronze medalist(s)	Yelena Shebashova (URS)	137

== See also ==
- 1969 World Running Target Championships
