= Bina Avrile =

Italian sharpshooter

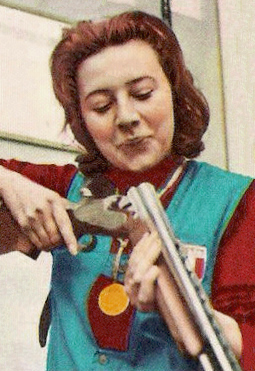

Sport
- Sport: Olympic trap shooting
Medal record
Representing Italy
World championships
Gold medal – first place	1969 San Sebastián	Trap, individual
Silver medal – second place	1970 Phoenix	Trap, individual
Gold medal – first place	1977 Antibes	Trap, team
Gold medal – first place	1978 Seoul	Trap, team
Silver medal – second place	1979 Montecatini Terme	Trap, team

Bina Avrile Guiducci is a retired Italian shotgun shooter who won three world titles in 1969–1979. She was the first Italian woman to win a world title in shooting. She retired around 1992.

Avrile took up shotgun shooting as therapy to recover from an illness, which left her bed-ridden. She used a Perazzi shotgun.
