= Shooting at the 1980 Summer Olympics – Mixed trap =

Sports shooting at the Olympics

Mixed trap at the Games of the XXII Olympiad
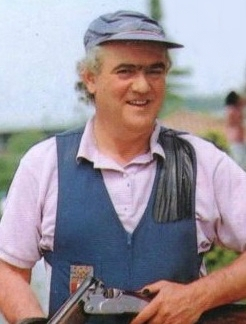
- Gold medalist Luciano giovannetti (1987)
- Venue: Moscow, Soviet Union
- Dates: 20–22 July 1980
- Competitors: 34 from 19 nations
- Winning score: 198

Medalists
1st place, gold medalist(s)		Luciano Giovannetti	Italy
2nd place, silver medalist(s)		Rustam Yambulatov	Soviet Union
3rd place, bronze medalist(s)		Jörg Damme	East Germany

The trap was a shooting sports event held as part of the Shooting at the 1980 Summer Olympics programme. The competition was held between 20 and 22 July 1980 at the shooting ranges in Moscow. 34 shooters from 19 nations competed. Each nation was limited to two shooters. The event was won by Luciano Giovannetti of Italy, the nation's fourth victory in the trap (most among nations, moving out of a tie with the United States). Silver went to the host Soviet Union's Rustam Yambulatov, that nation's first medal in the event since 1964. Jörg Damme of East Germany took bronze. The second through fourth places required a shoot-off, with a second shoot-off for silver and bronze.

== Background ==
This was the 13th appearance of the men's ISSF Olympic trap event. The event was held at every Summer Olympics from 1896 to 1924 (except 1904, when no shooting events were held) and from 1952 to 2016. As with most shooting events, it was nominally open to women from 1968 to 1980; the trap remained open to women through 1992. Very few women participated these years. The event returned to being men-only for 1996, though the new double trap had separate events for men and women that year. In 2000, a separate women's event was added and it has been contested at every Games since. There was also a men's team trap event held four times from 1908 to 1924.

Only one of the top 10 shooters from the 1976 Games returned: fourth-place finisher Burckhardt Hoppe of East Germany. The reigning champion, Donald Haldeman of the United States, was kept out by the American-led boycott. Three different Italian shooters had earned medals at the World Championships since the 1976 Games; Silvano Basagni was among the two shooters selected for the Olympic team. Basagni had earned Olympic bronze in 1972 and a World silver in 1978. He was joined by Luciano Giovannetti on the Italian squad. None of the three World Champions competed in Moscow; indeed, Basagni and 1979 silver medalist Aleksandr Asanov of the Soviet Union were the only two World medalists from the last three years.

Jordan made its debut in the event. Great Britain missed the event for the first time; Italy was the competing nation with the most appearances (9), with four nations (Great Britain, Canada, France, and Sweden) with more appearances not competing.

== Competition format ==
The competition used the 200-target format introduced with the return of trap to the Olympics in 1952. Only a single round of shooting was done, with all shooters facing 200 targets. Shooting was done in 8 series of 25 targets. The first three series (75 shots) were on day 1, the next three (75 shots) on day 2, and the final two series (50 shots) on day 3. Shoot-offs of 25 shots were used as necessary to break ties for medals.

== Records ==
Prior to this competition, the existing world and Olympic records were as follows.

World record	Angelo Scalzone (ITA)	199	Munich, West Germany	27–29 August 1972
Olympic record	Angelo Scalzone (ITA)	199	Munich, West Germany	27–29 August 1972

No new world or Olympic records were set during the competition.

== Schedule ==
Date	Time	Round
Sunday, 20 July 1980	10:00	Course 1
Monday, 21 July 1980	10:00	Course 2
Tuesday, 22 July 1980	10:00	Final course

== Results ==
Rank	Shooter	Nation	Total	Shoot-off 1	Shoot-off 2
1st place, gold medalist(s)	Luciano Giovannetti	Italy	198	—	
2nd place, silver medalist(s)	Rustam Yambulatov	Soviet Union	196	24	25
3rd place, bronze medalist(s)	Jörg Damme	East Germany	196	24	24
4	Josef Hojný	Czechoslovakia	196	23	—
5	Eladio Vallduvi	Spain	195	—	
6	Aleksandr Asanov	Soviet Union	195	—	
7	Silvano Basagni	Italy	194	—	
8	Burckhardt Hoppe	East Germany	192	—	
9	István Putz	Hungary	191	—	
10	Ricardo Sancho	Spain	190	—	
11	Thomas Hewitt	Ireland	189	—	
11	Josef Machan	Czechoslovakia	189	—	
11	Larry Vella	Malta	189	—	
14	László Ludmann	Hungary	188	—	
14	Heinrich Münzberger	Austria	188	—	
14	Karni Singh	India	188	—	
14	Pencho Vichev	Bulgaria	188	—	
18	Stayko Nenov	Bulgaria	187	—	
18	Marcos José Olsen	Brazil	187	—	
18	Nikolaus Reinprecht	Austria	187	—	
21	Randhir Singh	India	186	—	
22	Leo Franciosi	San Marino	185	—	
22	Elio Gasperoni	San Marino	185	—	
24	Francesco Gaset	Andorra	184	—	
25	Paul Meyer	Zimbabwe	183	—	
26	Adnan Houjeij	Syria	181	—	
26	Joan Tomas	Andorra	181	—	
28	Frans Chetcuti	Malta	179	—	
29	Nidal Nasser	Syria	178	—	
30	Francisco Romero Portilla	Guatemala	172	—	
31	Mohamed Issa Shahin	Jordan	171	—	
32	Francisco Boza	Peru	169	—	
33	Jason Cambitzis	Zimbabwe	165	—	
34	Nader George Shalhoub	Jordan	66	—	
