= Jürgen Henke =

East German sport shooter

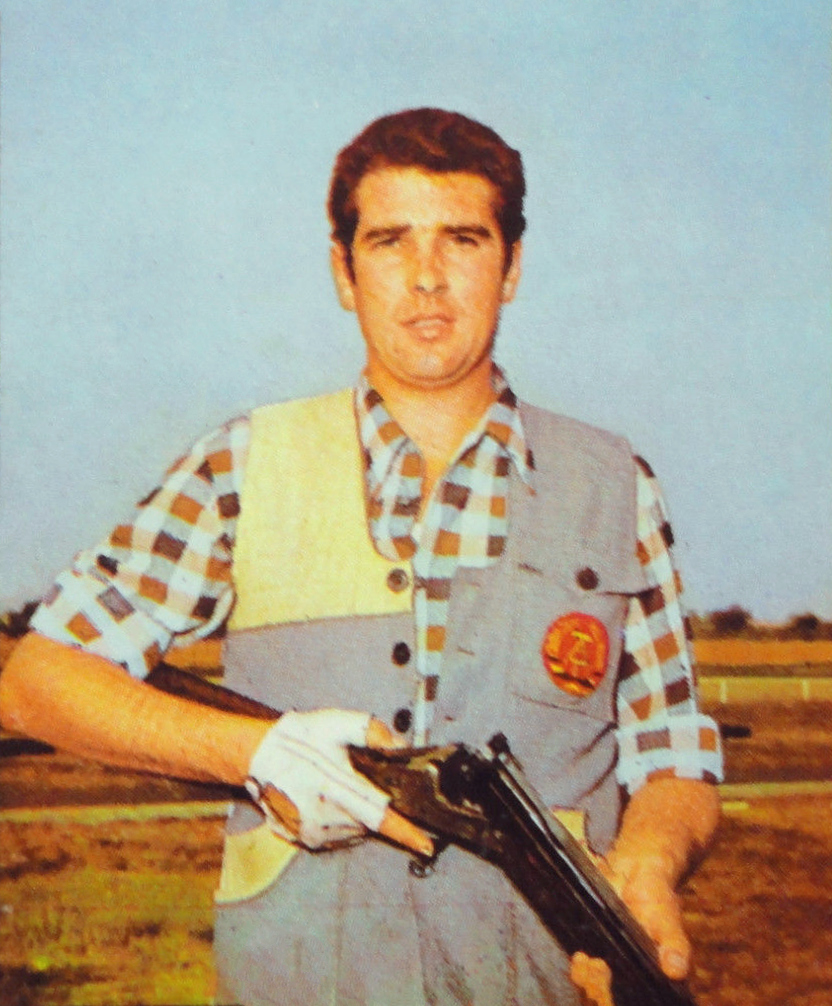
- Henke in 1972

Sport
- Sport: Shooting
- Event: Olympic trap
Medal record
Representing East Germany
World Championships
Silver medal – second place	1969 San Sebastián	Trap
Silver medal – second place	1971 Bologna	Trap

Jürgen Henke is a retired Olympic trap shooter from East Germany who won silver medals at the world championships in 1969 and 1971.
