= Alberto Carneroli =

Italian sport shooter (1943–2016)

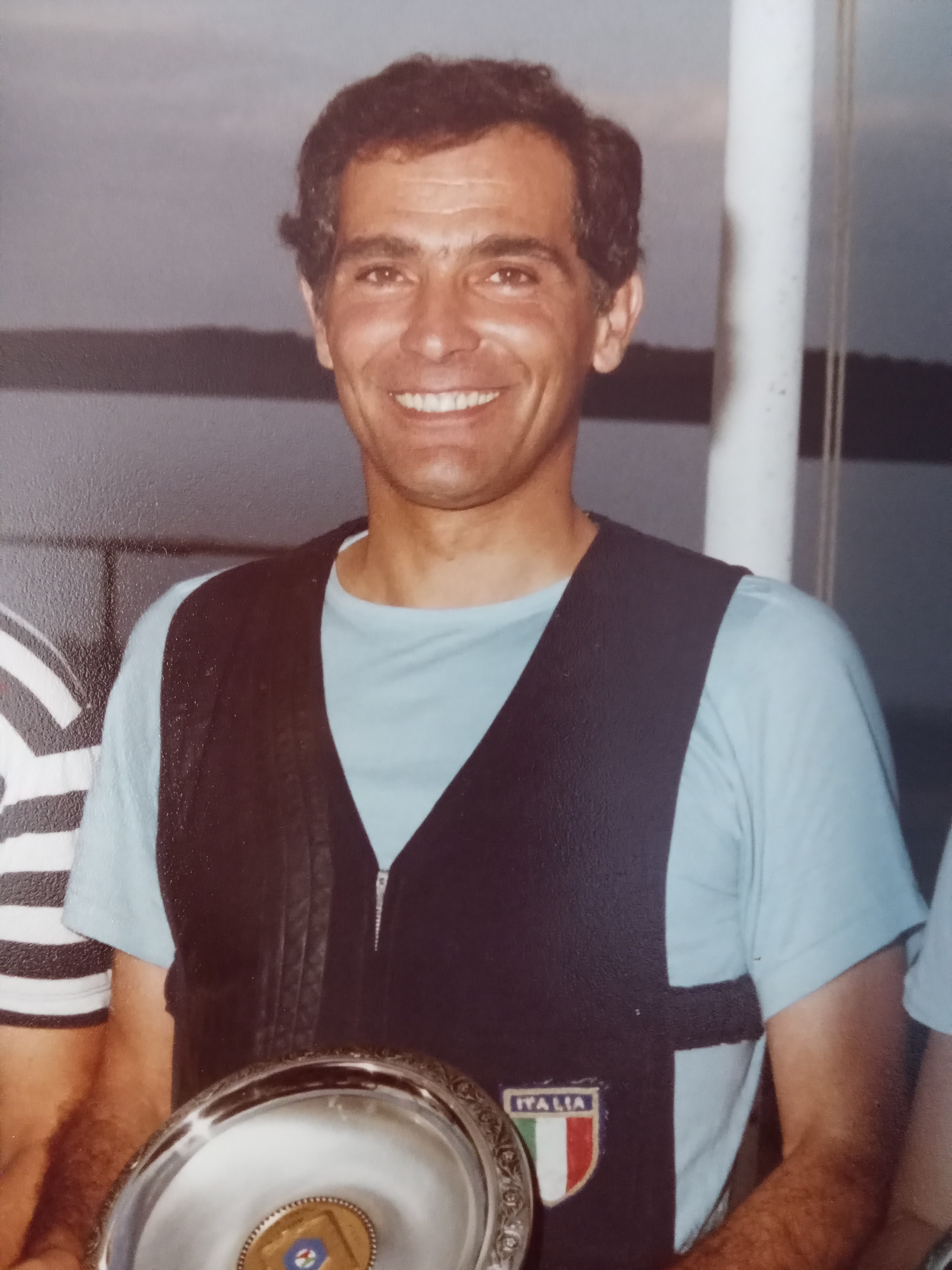
- Carneroli in 1982

Personal information
- National team: Italy
- Born: 22 February 1943 Urbino, Italy
- Died: 25 July 2016 (aged 73) Urbino, Italy

Sport
- Sport: Shooting
- Event: Trap
Medal record
Individual
Event	1st	2nd	3rd
European Championships	1	0	0
Team
Event	1st	2nd	3rd
World Championships	2	1	0
European Championships	2	0	0

Alberto Carneroli (22 February 1943 – 25 July 2016) was an Italian sport shooter who won medals at senior level at the World Championships and European Championships.

== Honours ==
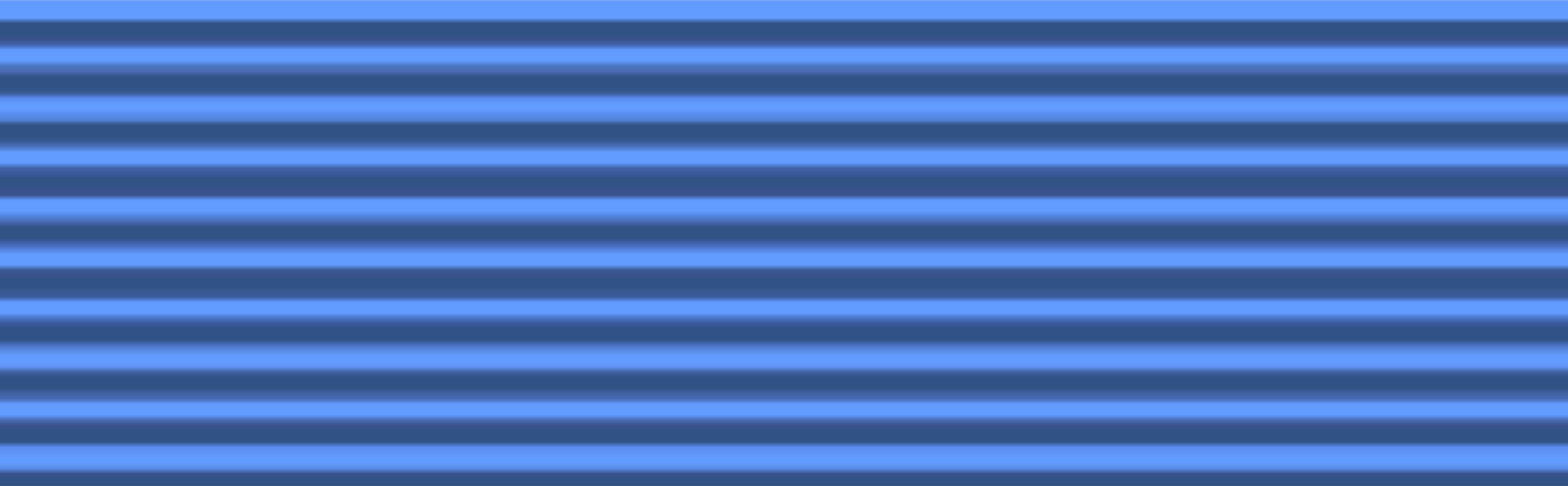

CONI: Golden Collar of Sports Merit: Collare d'Oro al Merito Sportivo

== See also ==
- Trap World Champions
