= Gheorghe Florescu (sport shooter) =

Romanian sports shooter

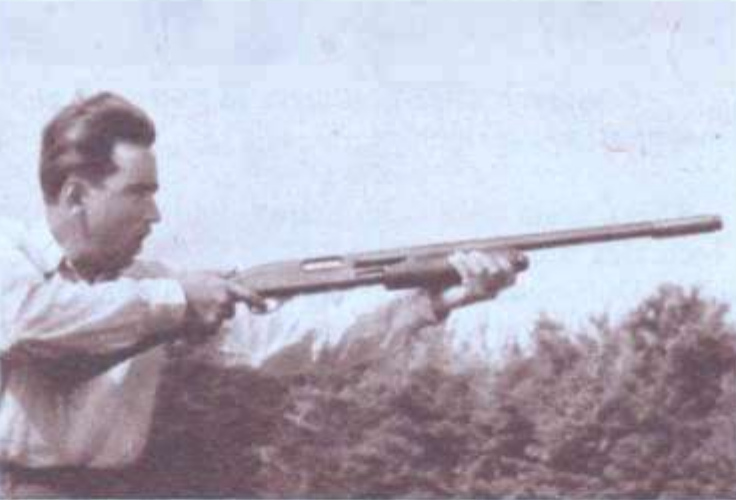
- Gheorghe Florescu in 1967

Personal information
- Born: 18 February 1928 Craiova, Kingdom of Romania

Sport
- Country: Romania
- Sport: Sports shooting

Gheorghe Florescu (born 18 February 1928) is a Romanian former sports shooter, Olympian, and medalist of the World and European Shooting Championships.

== Sports career ==
Florescu competed at the Olympics twice for Romania, competing in trap 1968 Summer Olympics and the 1972 Summer Olympics.

Florescu participated at the World Shooting Championships three times, each time gaining a medal. In 1958, his team won bronze in skeet, 1966, his team won silver in trap, 1971, he won bronze in trap, and in 1966, during the European Championship he and his team won silver in trap.

Florescu's teammates were Ion Dumitrescu, Gheorghe Enache, and Ștefan Popovici.

== Performance ==
=== Olympic Games ===
Games	Competition	Points	Place	Source
1968 Summer Olympics	Trap	191	21	
1972 Summer Olympics	Trap	190	14	

=== World Championship ===
Games	Competition	Points	Place	Source
Moscow 1958	Skeet, team	377 (team)	3rd place, bronze medalist(s)	
Wiesbaden 1966	Trap, team	764 (team)	2nd place, silver medalist(s)	
Bologna 1971	Trap	187	3rd place, bronze medalist(s)	

=== European Championship ===
Games	Competition	Points	Place	Source
Lahti 1966	Trap, team	?	2nd place, silver medalist(s)	
