= Sonja Scheibl =

German sport shooter (born 1979)

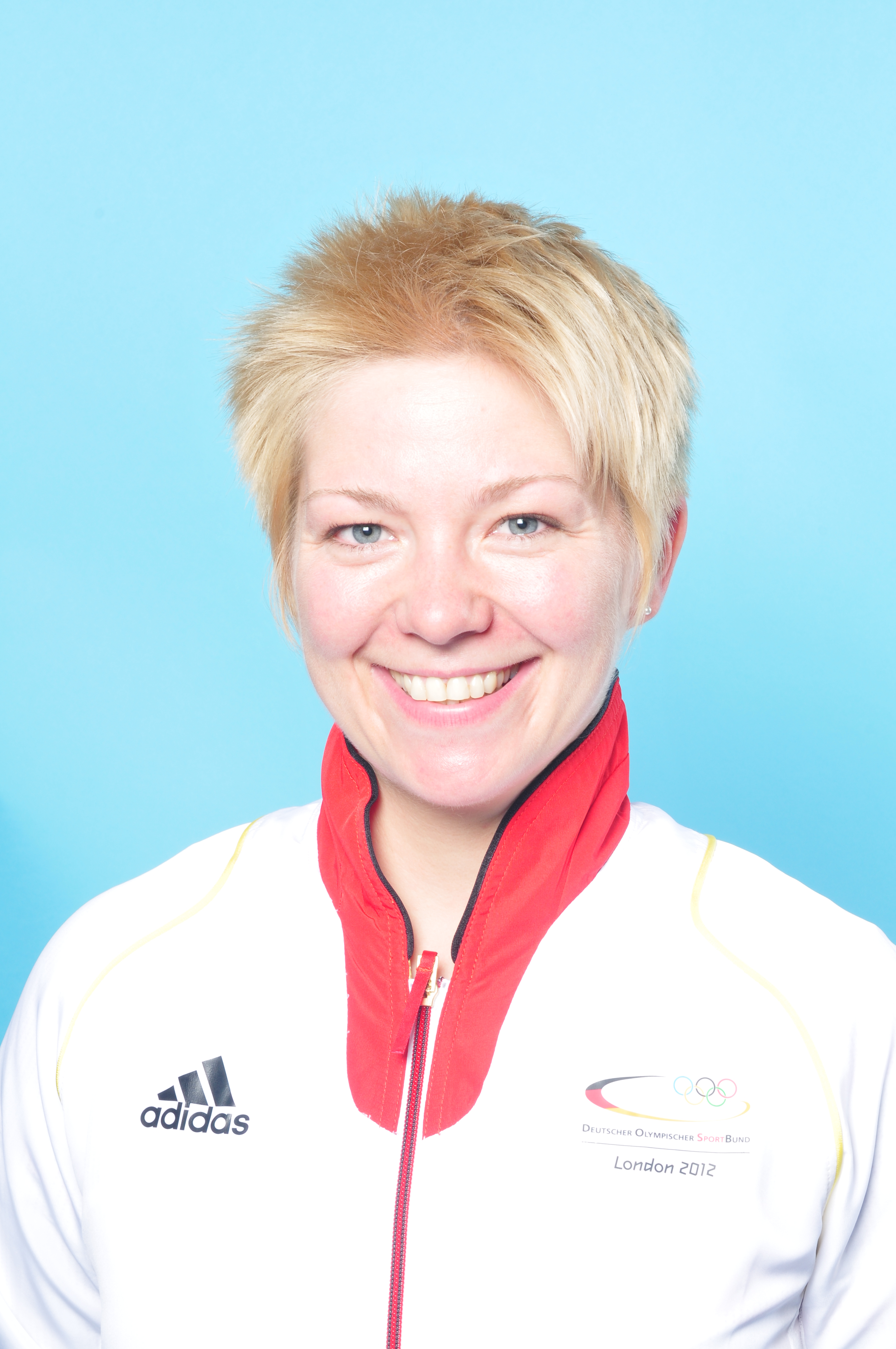

Personal information
- Nationality: Germany
- Born: September 5, 1979 (age 46) Itzstedt, West Germany
- Height: 1.63 m (5 ft 4 in)
- Weight: 66 kg (146 lb)

Sport
- Sport: Shooting
- Event: Trap
- Club: Itzstedter SV
- Coached by: Wilhelm Metelmann

Sonja Scheibl (born September 5, 1979) is a German trap shooter. She previously worked as a carpenter before she became a member of Itzstedter SV shooting club, where she was trained by her coach Wilhelm Metelmann. In 1998, Scheibl made her international debut by competing at the World Championships in Barcelona, and by winning the bronze medal in the team event, along with her teammates Silke Hüsing and Susanne Kiermayer. A year later, Scheibl won the bronze medal at the European Championships in Tampere for the individual trap, and in 2001, she led her team to win the bronze in the trap and the silver in the double trap events at the 2001 European Shooting Championships in Zagreb.

Despite missing out of medals at the shooting championships, Scheibl proved successful to achieve higher placements for both team and individual trap events. Scheibl also guaranteed her qualifying place at the 2012 Summer Olympics in London, where she placed seventeenth in the women's trap event.

== Career achievements ==
Olympic Games

- 2012 Summer Olympics, London – 17th place

World Championships

- 1998 World Championships, Barcelona – bronze medal, team trap event

European Championships

- 1999 European Shooting Championships, Tampere – bronze medal, individual trap event
- 2001 European Shooting Championships, Zagreb – bronze medal, team trap event
- 2001 European Shooting Championships, Zagreb – silver medal, team double trap event
- 2004 European Shooting Championships, Nicosia – silver medal, team trap event
- 2006 European Shooting Championships, Nicosia – bronze medal, team trap event
