= Sándor Lumniczer =

Hungarian sport shooter (1896–1958)

Personal information
- Born: 16 January 1896 Budapest, Austria-Hungary
- Died: 24 December 1958 (aged 62) Budapest, Hungary

Sport
- Sport: Sports shooting

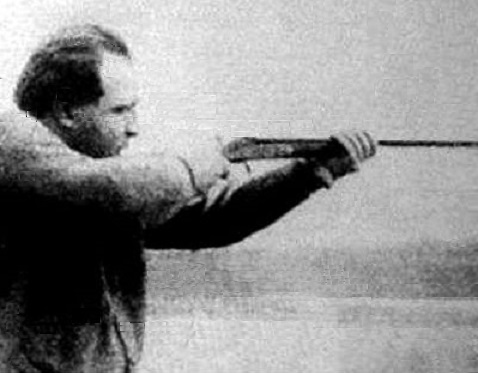

Sándor Lumniczer (16 January 1896 – 24 December 1958) was a Hungarian sport shooter who competed in the 1924 Summer Olympics.

In the 1924 Summer Olympics he participated in the following events:

- Team clay pigeons – 10th place
- 100 metre running deer, single shots – 31st place
- individual trap – 10th by teams (321); result for himself 31-44 (score unknown)

Trap World Championships:

- He won three times (1929 in Stockholm, 1933 in Vienna and 1939 in Berlin), came in 2nd twice (1931 in Lviv and 1935 in Brussels), and came in 3rd twice (1930 in Rome and 1937 in Helsinki).
- As a member of the Hungarian team, he won six times (1929 in Stockholm, 1933 in Vienna, 1934 in Budapest, 1935 in Brussels, 1936 and 1939 both in Berlin) and came in 3rd once (1938 in Luhačovice).

Trap European Championships:

- He won twice (1933 in Vienna and 1937 in Helsinki) and came in 2nd four times (1931 in Lviv, 1934 in Budapest, 1935 in Brussels and 1938 in Luhačovice).
- As a member of the Hungarian team, he won six times (1929 in Stockholm, 1931 in Lviv, 1933 in Vienna, 1934 in Budapest, 1935 in Brussels and 1936 in Berlin).
