= Hans Liljedahl =

Swedish sport shooter

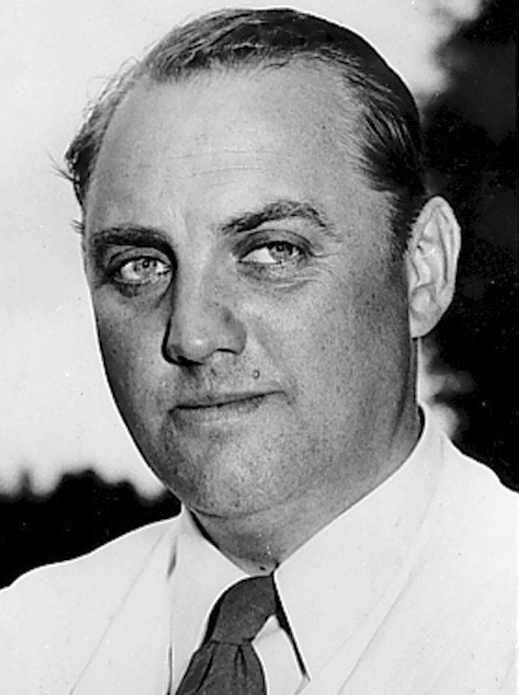

Personal information
- Born: 7 April 1913 Stockholm, Sweden
- Died: 9 November 1991 (aged 78) Lidingö, Sweden

Sport
- Sport: Sports shooting
- Event: Olympic trap
- Club: Hjortskyttarna, Stockholm
Medal record
Men's shooting
Representing Sweden
Olympic Games
Bronze medal – third place	1952 Helsinki	Trap
World championships
Gold medal – first place	1947 Stockholm	Trap, team
Gold medal – first place	1947 Stockholm	Trap, individual
Gold medal – first place	1952 Oslo	Trap, team
Silver medal – second place	1949 Buenos Aires	Trap, team

Hans Gustaf Liljedahl (7 April 1913 – 9 November 1991) was a Swedish sport shooter. He competed in trap shooting at the 1952 and 1956 Olympics and finished third and eighth, respectively. He won three world titles in this event, in 1947 and 1952.

== Personal life ==
Liljedahl was born in Stockholm on 7 April 1913.

He died in Lidingö on 9 November 1991.
