= James Poindexter =

American sports shooter

Personal information
- Born: March 4, 1949 (age 77) Los Angeles, California, United States

Sport
- Sport: Sports shooting

James Poindexter (born March 4, 1949) is an American sports shooter. He competed in the trap event at the 1972 Summer Olympics.
