= João Rebelo =

Portuguese sport shooter

João Rebelo (born 20 March 1961 in Aljustrel) is a Portuguese former sport shooter who competed in the 1984, 1988, 1992, 1996, and 2000 Summer Olympics.
