= Peter Blecher =

German sports shooter (1934–2008)

Personal information
- Born: 3 February 1934 Hagen, Germany
- Died: 27 August 2008 (aged 74)

Sport
- Sport: Sports shooting

Peter Blecher (3 February 1934 – 27 August 2008) was a German sports shooter. He competed at the 1972 Summer Olympics and the 1984 Summer Olympics for West Germany.
