= Aleksandr Androshkin =

Soviet sports shooter

Personal information
- Born: 6 July 1947 Stalino, Soviet Union
- Died: 11 January 2010 (aged 62)

Sport
- Sport: Sports shooting

Aleksandr Androshkin (6 July 1947 – 11 January 2010) was a Soviet sports shooter. He competed at the 1972 Summer Olympics and the 1976 Summer Olympics.
