= Pāvels Seničevs =

Latvian sports shooter

Personal information
- Born: 10 June 1924 Veliky Novgorod, Soviet Union
- Died: 19 May 1997 (aged 72) Kohtla-Järve, Estonia

Sport
- Sport: Sports shooting
Medal record
Men's shooting
Representing Soviet Union
Olympic Games
Silver medal – second place	1964 Tokyo	Trap

Pāvels Seničevs (10 June 1924 – 19 May 1997) was a Soviet sports shooter. He competed at the 1964 Summer Olympics and the 1968 Summer Olympics.

== Biography ==
In October 1962 he was a member of the Soviet team at the 38th World Shooting Championships in Cairo. He was armed with MTs 8 shotgun In the trap event at the 1964 Olympics, he won a silver medal.

In 1966 he finished in first place in Brno. In 1967 he finished in first place in Moscow.
