= Jean-Jacques Baud =

French sports shooter

Personal information
- Born: 26 September 1947 (age 78)

Sport
- Sport: Sports shooting

Jean-Jacques Baud (born 26 September 1947) is a French former sports shooter. He competed in the trap event at the 1972 Summer Olympics.
