= Edoardo Casciano =

Italian sports shooter

Personal information
- Born: 9 January 1936 Rome, Italy
- Died: 22 October 1997 (aged 61)

Sport
- Sport: Sports shooting

Edoardo Casciano (9 January 1936 – 22 October 1997) was an Italian sports shooter. He competed in the trap event at the 1960 Summer Olympics.
