= Hocke =

Hocke is a surname. Notable people with the surname include:

- Annika Hocke (born 2000), German pair skater
- Hans Hocke (born 1939), Austrian fencer
- Holger Hocke (born 1945), German rower
- Stephan Hocke (born 1983), German ski jumper
- Björn Höcke (born 1972), German politician
