= Sabet =

Sabet is a surname. Notable people with the surname include:

- Abdul Jabar Sabet (1945–2023), Afghan politician
- Bijan Sabet, American venture capitalist and diplomat
- Firoozeh Kashani-Sabet, Iranian and American historian
- Habib Sabet (1903–1993), Iranian businessman
- Hossein Sabet (born 1934), Iranian businessman
- Kevin Sabet (born 1979), American governmental official
- Khaled Sabet (born 1961), Egyptian sports shooter
- Mahvash Sabet (born 1953), Iranian poet and prisoner
- Mounir Sabet (born 1936), Egyptian general
- Shahla S. Sabet (born 1946), Iranian and American judge, and lawyer; the first Iranian American judge in the State of California
- Scarlett Sabet (born 1989), English poet
- Tarek Sabet (born 1963), Egyptian sports shooter
