= Muriel Bernard =

French sport shooter (born 1961)

Muriel Bernard (born 24 January 1961) is a French former sport shooter who competed in the 1992 Summer Olympics and in the 1996 Summer Olympics.
