= José Bladas =

Spanish sports shooter

José Bladas Torras (born July 23, 1957, in Terrassa) is a Spanish sports shooter. He competed in the Summer Olympics in 1988 and 1992. In 1988, he tied for 18th place in the mixed trap event, and in the 1992 Olympics, he finished in seventh place in the mixed trap event.
