= Frank Little (sport shooter) =

American sports shooter

Personal information
- Born: April 16, 1936 Endicott, New York, United States
- Died: December 16, 1993 (aged 57) Endicott, New York, United States

Sport
- Sport: Sports shooting

Frank Little (April 16, 1936 – December 16, 1993) was an American sports shooter. He competed in the trap event at the 1964 Summer Olympics.
