= Pierre Candelo =

French sports shooter

Personal information
- Born: 9 April 1934 Monaco
- Died: 9 November 2020 (aged 86)

Sport
- Sport: Sports shooting

Pierre Candelo (9 April 1934 – 9 November 2020) was a French sports shooter. He competed in the trap event at the 1968 Summer Olympics.
