= Kurt Schöbel =

German sports shooter (1896–1966)

Personal information
- Born: 31 October 1896 Thallwitz, German Empire
- Died: 27 December 1966 (aged 70) Oldenburg, West Germany

Sport
- Sport: Sports shooting

Kurt Schöbel (31 October 1896 – 27 December 1966) was a German sports shooter. He competed in the trap event at the 1952 Summer Olympics.
