= Bernard Blondeau =

French sports shooter

Personal information
- Nationality: French
- Born: 28 May 1944 (age 82)

Sport
- Sport: Sports shooting

Bernard Blondeau (born 28 May 1944) is a French sports shooter. He competed in the mixed trap event at the 1976 Summer Olympics.
