= Jaime Bladas =

Spanish sports shooter

Personal information
- Full name: Jaime Bladas Santasusagna
- Born: 11 May 1936 Barcelona, Spain
- Died: 16 June 2021 (aged 85)

Sport
- Sport: Sports shooting

Jaime Bladas (11 May 1936 – 16 June 2021) was a Spanish sports shooter. He competed at the 1964 Summer Olympics and the 1968 Summer Olympics. He finished ninth in the trap shooting and tenth in the skeet.
