= Ennio Mattarelli =

Italian sport shooter (1928–2026)

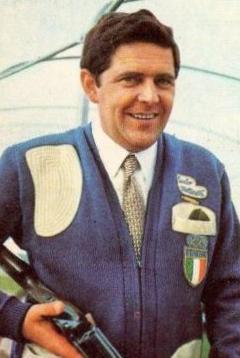

Personal information
- Nationality: Italian
- Born: 5 August 1928 Bologna, Italy
- Died: 23 August 2026 (aged 98) Bologna, Italy
- Height: 1.81 m (5 ft 11 1/2 in)
- Weight: 86 kg (190 lb)

Sport
- Country: Italy
- Sport: Shooting
- Club: Tiro a Volo Bononia
Medal record
Men's Shooting
| Gold medal – first place | 1964 Tokyo | Trap Shooting |
World Championships
| Gold medal – first place | 1961 Oslo | Trap Shooting |
| Gold medal – first place | 1969 San Sebastian | Trap Shooting |
| Bronze medal – third place | 1973 Melbourne | Trap Shooting |

Ennio Mattarelli (5 August 1928 – 23 August 2026) was an Italian sport shooter and Olympic champion. He won the gold medal in trap shooting at the 1964 Summer Olympics in Tokyo. He also competed at the 1968 Summer Olympics.

== Early life ==
Mattarelli was orphaned at the age of five and raised by his grandfather, Silvio. He started working at the age of 14 and didn't begin clay pigeon shooting until he was 26. Later, he worked at an arms company, where he gained experience with firearms, despite not having formal training.

== Business ventures ==
In 1988, Ennio Mattarelli founded the company Mattarelli, which produces a range of clay target throwing equipment designed for skeet and Olympic trap. Mattarelli equipment has been used at prestigious events, including the Atlanta and Sydney Olympic games, as well as numerous other international competitions, such as the World Cups and the ISSF World Championships.

== Death ==
Ennio Mattarelli died on 23 August 2026, at the age of 98.
