= David Malone (sport shooter) =

Irish sports shooter

Personal information
- Nationality: Irish
- Born: 10 March 1964 (age 61) Dublin, Ireland

Sport
- Sport: Sports shooting

David Malone (born 10 March 1964) is an Irish sports shooter. He competed in the men's trap event at the 2000 Summer Olympics.
