= Albano Pera =

Italian sport shooter

Personal information
- Born: 13 February 1950 (age 76) Capannori, Lucca, Italy
Medal record
Men's shooting
Representing Italy
Olympic Games
Silver medal – second place	1996 Atlanta	Double trap
European Championships
Gold medal – first place	1988 Istanbul	Trap
Silver medal – second place	1989 Zagreb	Trap

Albano Pera (born 13 February 1950) is an Italian sport shooter and Olympic medalist. He received a silver medal in Double Trap at the 1996 Summer Olympics in Atlanta He is European champion from 1988 (Trap), and received a silver medal in 1989.

Olympic results
Event	1988	1992	1996
Trap (mixed)	10th 145+48	—	Not held
Double trap (men)	Not held		(silver) Silver; 139+44
