= Jörg Damme =

German sport shooter (born 1959)

Olympic medal record

Shooting

Representing East Germany
Bronze medal – third place	1980 Moscow	Trap

Jörg Damme (born 9 May 1959 in Pretzsch) is a German former sport shooter who competed in the 1980 Summer Olympics, in the 1988 Summer Olympics, in the 1992 Summer Olympics, and in the 1996 Summer Olympics.
