= Walter Zobell =

American sports shooter

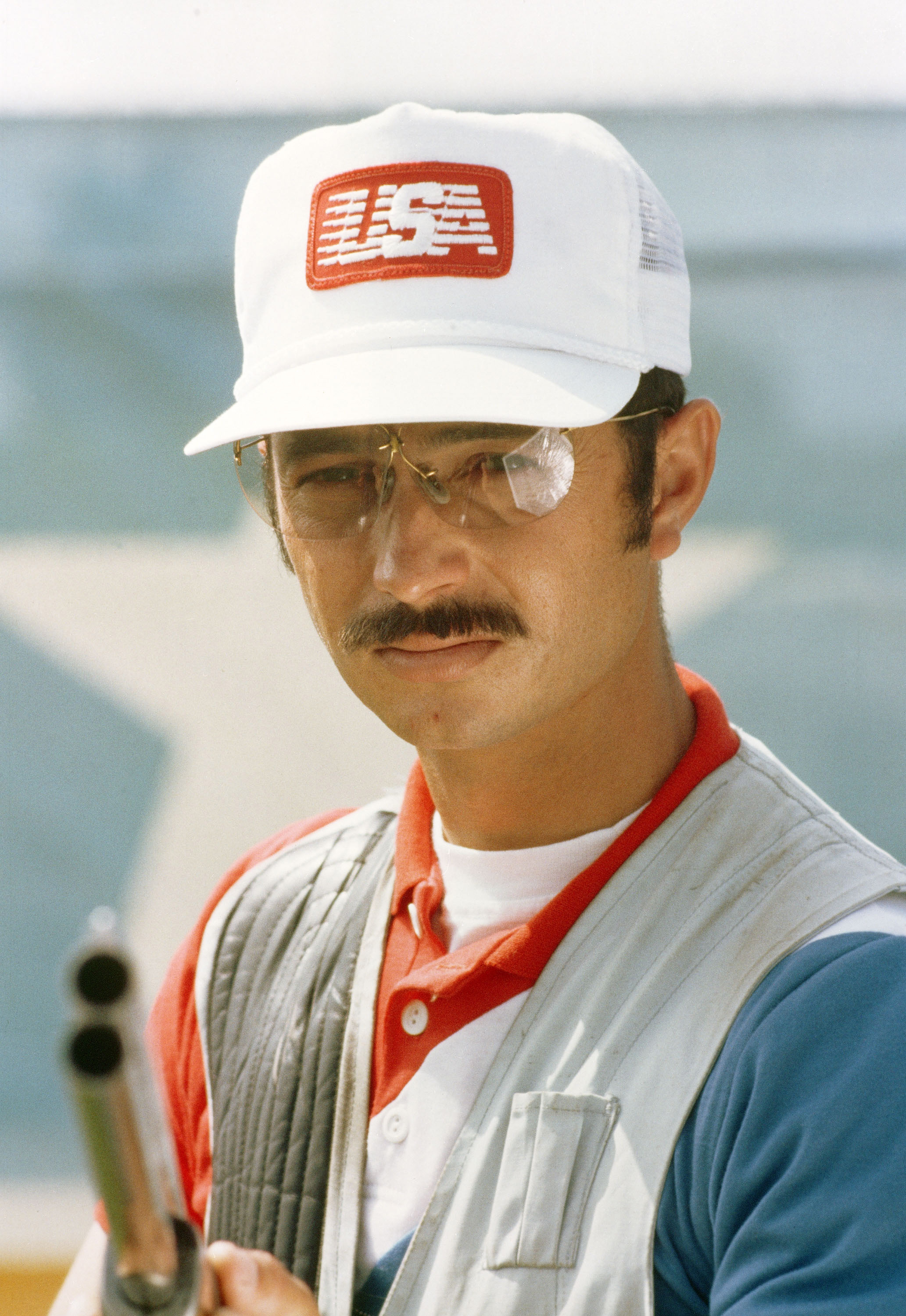
- Zobell in 1984

Personal information
- Born: Walter Ward Zobell, Jr. April 21, 1950 (age 76) Provo, Utah, U.S.
- Height: 1.73 m (5 ft 8 in)
- Weight: 71 kg (157 lb)

Sport
- Sport: Sports shooting
- Event: Mixed trap
- University team: Montana State University Bobcats
Medal record
Representing the United States
ISSF World Shooting Championships
Gold medal – first place	1970 Phoenix	Trap Team
Bronze medal – third place	1974 Bern-Thun	Trap Team
Gold medal – first place	1975 Munich	Trap Team
Gold medal – first place	1978 Seoul	Trap Team
Pan American Games
Gold medal – first place	1975 Ciudad de México	Trap Team
Gold medal – first place	1979 San Juan	Trap Team
Olympic Games

Walter Ward Zobell, Jr. (born April 21, 1950) is an American sports shooter. He competed in the mixed trap event at the 1984 Summer Olympics. During his trap shooting career he won 4 medals in the World Shooting Championships and 2 gold medals in the Pan American Games. Walter served in the U.S. Army Reserve till 1998. He is a cattle rancher in Montana and has a degree in economics from Montana State University.

== World Shooting Championships ==
Zobell has won 4 medals, 3 gold and 1 bronze in the ISSF World Shooting Championships from 1970 to 1978, specifically:

- A gold medal in team trap in 1970, in Phoenix, Arizona, United States.
- A bronze medal in team trap in 1974 in Bern-Thun, Switzerland.
- A gold medal in team trap in 1975 in München, Bundesrepublik Deutschland (or Munich, West Germany).
- A gold medal in team trap in 1978 in Seoul, South Korea.

== Pan American Games ==
Zobell has won 2 gold medals in the Pan American Games in 1975 and 1979.

== University years ==
In 1978, Zobell earned a Bachelor's Degree in Economics from Montana State University.

== Olympics ==
Zobell scored 181 for 22nd place out of 70 Olympic contestants and only 11 points behind the 3 medal winners that all tied with a score of 192, in the mixed trap event at the 1984 Summer Olympic Games, in Los Angeles, California, for Team USA.

== Military service ==
Zobell served his country in the Army Reserves.

== Career ==
What does a guy with an economics degree from MSU decide to do for a business career? Zobell decided to be a rancher.

== Personal life ==
Zobell is a member of the Church of Jesus Christ of Latter-day Saints.
