= Alessia Iezzi =

Italian sport shooter

Personal information
- Nationality: Italian
- Born: 23 July 1996 (age 29) Chieti, Italy
- Height: 1.68 m (5 ft 6 in)
- Weight: 65 kg (143 lb)

Sport
- Country: Italy
- Sport: Shooting
- Event: Trap
- Club: Centro Sportivo Carabinieri
Medal record
Women's shooting
Representing Italy
World Championships
Gold medal – first place	2018 Changwon	Trap team
Gold medal – first place	2022 Osijek	Trap team
Bronze medal – third place	2017 Moscow	Trap team
European Championships
Gold medal – first place	2016 Lonato der Garda	Trap team
Gold medal – first place	2025 Chateauroux	Trap Team

Alessia Iezzi (born 23 July 1996) is an Italian sport shooter.

She participated at the 2018 ISSF World Shooting Championships, winning a medal.
