= Zygmunt Kiszkurno =

Polish sport shooter (1921–2012)

Personal information
- Born: 6 January 1921 Brudzew, Poland
- Died: 24 August 2012 (aged 91)

Sport
- Sport: Sports shooting
Medal record
Men's shooting
Representing Poland
European Shooting Championships
Silver medal – second place	1964 Bologna	Trap shooting

Zygmunt Kiszkurno (6 January 1921 – 24 August 2012) was a Polish sport shooter who competed in the men's trap event at the 1956 Summer Olympics in Melbourne, where he finished 15th in a field of 32 competitors. He was born in Brudzew, Turek County and completed high school in 1939 in Warsaw. He trained in Łódź to be a dentist and received a medical degree from the University of Warsaw in 1969. During this time he also served in the Polish Land Forces, eventually achieving the rank of Pułkownik.

Kiszkurno continued shooting competitively following his Olympic appearance and was the Polish national champion in trap shooting in 1957 and 1969. Additionally, he won a silver medal at the 1964 European Shooting Championships. His father Józef, also a sports shooter, competed in the same event in the previous year's Olympic Games and placed 9th. Between the years 1928-1953 Józef won the shooting championships of Poland 19 times. In 1931, 1936 and 1938 he won the World Championships.
