= Fulvio Rocchi =

Argentine sports shooter

Personal information
- Nationality: Argentina/Italian
- Born: 7 August 1909 Italy
- Died: 16 December 1960 (aged 51) Argentina

Sport
- Sport: Sports shooting

Fulvio Rocchi (7 August 1909 – 16 December 1960) was an Argentine sports shooter. He competed in the trap event at the 1952 Summer Olympics.
