= Paola Tattini =

Italian sport shooter

Personal information
- National team: Italy
- Born: 13 February 1958 (age 68) Ozzano dell'Emilia, Italy

Sport
- Sport: Shooting
- Event: Trap
Medal record
Individual
| Event | 1st | 2nd | 3rd |
|---|---|---|---|
| World Championships | 4 | 2 | 0 |
| European Championships | 0 | 2 | 4 |
| Total | 4 | 4 | 4 |

Paola Tattini (born 13 February 1958) is a former Italian female sport shooter who won medals at individual senior level at the World Championships and European Championships.

== Biography ==
After her competitive career in trap (shotgun), Paola Tattini dedicated herself to the practice of helice shooting, obtaining some good results as a gold medal at the European Championships in Castanea delle Furie, Messina won in 2019.

In December 2019 she received the important honor of the Golden Collar for sporting merit from the Italian National Olympic Committee.

== Honours ==
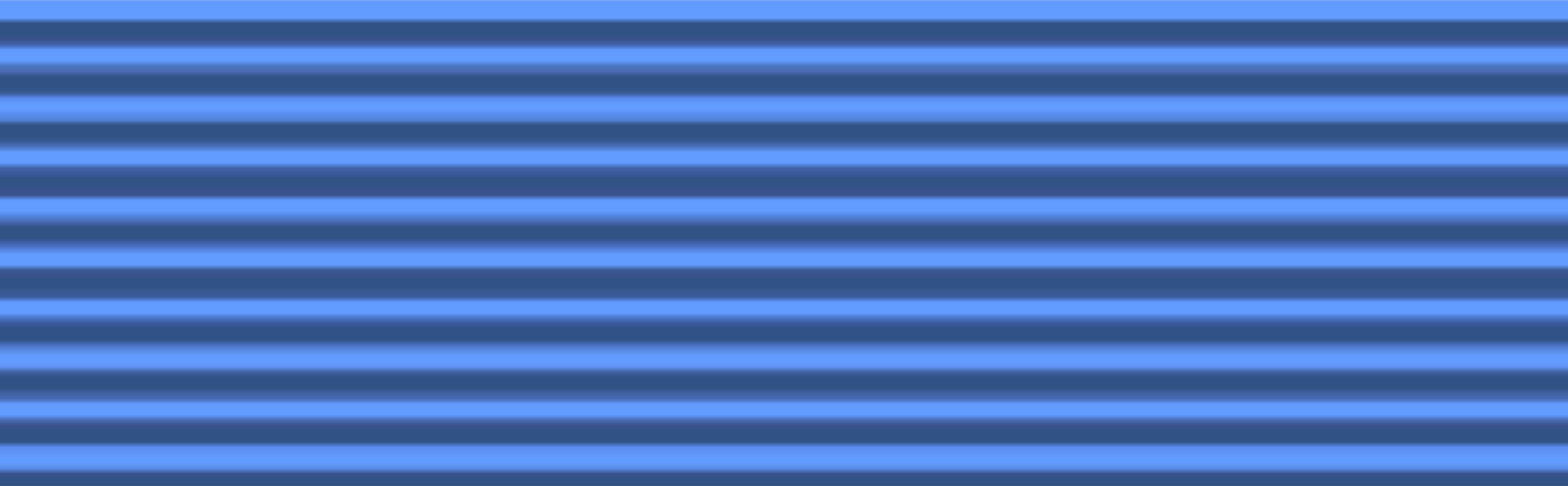

CONI: Golden Collar of Sports Merit: Collare d'Oro al Merito Sportivo (2019)

== See also ==
- Trap World Champions
