= Italo Bellini =

Italian sports shooter

Personal information
- Born: 20 July 1915 Castelraimondo, Italy
- Died: 1 January 1993 (aged 77) Rome, Italy

Sport
- Sport: Sports shooting

Italo Bellini (20 July 1915 – 1 January 1993) was an Italian sports shooter. He competed in the trap event at the 1952 Summer Olympics.
