= Aleksandr Alipov =

Soviet sports shooter

Personal information
- Born: 25 May 1948 (age 78) Dalian, China

Sport
- Sport: Sports shooting

Aleksandr Alipov (born 25 May 1948) is a Soviet former sports shooter. He competed at the 1968, 1972 and the 1976 Summer Olympics.
