= Josh Lakatos =

American sport shooter (born 1973)

Personal information
- Full name: Joshua David Lakatos
- Born: March 24, 1973 (age 53) Pasadena, California, U.S.
Medal record
Men's shooting
Representing the United States
Olympic Games
Silver medal – second place	1996 Atlanta	Trap

Joshua David "Josh" Lakatos (born March 24, 1973) is an American former Olympic target shooter. He was born in Pasadena, California.

== Career ==
At the 1992 Olympic Trials, Lakatos did not make the Olympic team, finishing in seventh place.

At the 1996 Summer Olympics, Lakatos won a silver medal in the trap. At the 2000 Summer Olympics, Lakatos finished in 16th place in the trap.

== Stunt career ==
In the 2019 film Joker, Lakatos drove the ambulance into the police car towards the end of the film.
