= Miloslav Bednařík =

Czech sport shooter

Personal information
- Nationality: Czechoslovakia
- Born: 30 January 1965 Olomouc, Czechoslovakia
- Died: 16 June 1989 (aged 24) Brno, Czechoslovakia
- Height: 1.75 m (5 ft 9 in)
- Weight: 92 kg (203 lb)

Sport
- Sport: Shooting
Medal record
Shooting
Representing Czechoslovakia
Olympic Games
Silver medal – second place	1988 Seoul	Trap

Miloslav Bednařík (30 January 1965 – 16 June 1989) was a Czech sport shooter. He represented Czechoslovakia at the 1988 Summer Olympics in Seoul, where he received the silver medal in the trap event.

Bednařík was killed in a motorcycle accident at the age of 24.
