= Angelo Alberto Giani =

Italian sport shooter

Personal information
- National team: Italy
- Born: 11 August 1955 (age 70) Saronno, Italy
- Died: August 2006 (aged 50–51) Italy

Sport
- Sport: Shooting
- Event: Trap
Medal record
Individual
Event	1st	2nd	3rd
World Championships	0	0	1
European Championships	0	0	1
Total	0	0	2
Team
Event	1st	2nd	3rd
World Championships	4	0	0

Angelo Alberto Giani (11 August 1955 - 2006) was an Italian sport shooter who won a medal at individual senior level at the World Championships and European Championships.
