= Eladio Vallduvi =

Spanish sport shooter

Personal information
- Full name: Eladio Vallduví Casals
- Born: 26 April 1950 (age 76) Tarragona, Spain
- Height: 178 cm (5 ft 10 in)
- Weight: 75 kg (165 lb)

Sport
- Sport: Sports shooting

Eladio Vallduvi Casals (Note: In this Spanish name, the first or paternal surname is Vallduvi and the second or maternal family name is Casals.) (born 26 April 1950) is a Spanish former sport shooter who competed in the 1972 Summer Olympics, in the 1976 Summer Olympics, in the 1980 Summer Olympics, in the 1984 Summer Olympics, and in the 1988 Summer Olympics.
