= Michel Carrega =

French sports shooter (1934–2024)

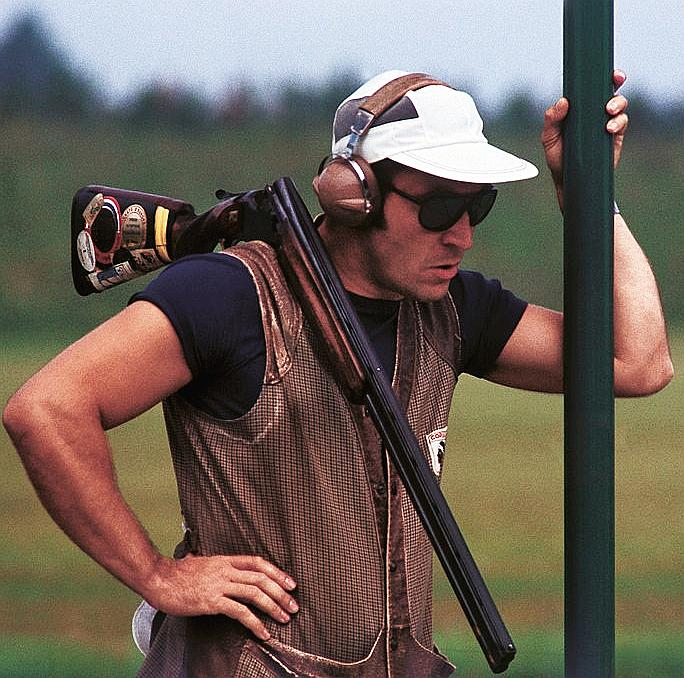
- Carrega at the 1972 Olympics

Personal information
- Born: 25 September 1934 Paris, France
- Died: 26 September 2024 (aged 90)
- Height: 1.78 m (5 ft 10 in)
- Weight: 83 kg (183 lb)

Sport
- Sport: Trap shooting
Medal record
Representing France
Olympic Games
Silver medal – second place	1972 Munich	Trap

Michel Carrega (25 September 1934 – 26 September 2024) was a French sport shooter. A four-time world champion, Carrega represented France at four Summer Olympics and won a silver medal at the 1972 Summer Olympics in Munich, West Germany. Carrega is one of only two Corsicans to win an Olympic medal.

== Personal life ==
Carrega was born in Paris, France on 25 September 1934. Carega lived in the town of Santa-Maria-di-Lota in Corsica.

== Sports shooting ==
Carrega made his Olympic debut at the 1968 Summer Olympics in Mexico City, Mexico. His only event was the mixed trap where he was ranked 12th overall.

Two years later, he won his first world championship at the 1970 ISSF World Shooting Championships in Phoenix, Arizona, United States. He took gold in the men's trap and was part of the French team which won silver in the team trap. A year later, he retained his trap world title at the 1971 World Shotgun Championships in Bologna, Italy and was part of the French team which won bronze.

At the 1972 Summer Olympics in Munich, West Germany, Carrega again entered the mixed trap. He finished second to become the first Corsican to win an Olympic medal.

Carrega was again the men's trap world champion at the 1974 ISSF World Shooting Championships held in Bern and Thun, Switzerland. He also helped the French team to the gold medal in the team trap at the same championships.

At the 1976 Summer Olympics in Montreal, Quebec, Canada, Carrega was unable to repeat his Munich performance and was ranked 31st overall in the mixed trap.

He won his last world title at the 1979 World Shotgun Championships in Montecatini Terme, Italy when he again won the men's trap competition. The French team won a bronze medal in the team trap at the same championships.

The French team at the 1982 World Shooting Championships in Caracas, Venezuela, which Carrega was a part of, won a silver medal in the team trap.

Carrega made his last Olympic appearance at the 1984 Summer Olympics in Los Angeles, California, United States. He came close to repeating his feat from 1972 in the mixed trap but ended two points shy of the shoot-off for the medals, finishing fifth overall.

Carrega was also a 21-time French clay pigeon shooting champion.

== Death ==
Carrega died at the age of 90 on 26 September 2024. Tributes were paid to him in the Corsican Assembly following his death.
