= Edward Ling =

English sport shooter (born 1983)

Medal record

Representing Great Britain

Olympic Games
Bronze medal – third place	2016 Rio de Janeiro	Trap

World Championships
Silver medal – second place	2014 Grenada	Trap
Silver medal – second place	2017 Moscow	Trap
Bronze medal – third place	2011 Belgrade	Team Trap

Edward Ling (born 7 March 1983) is an English sport shooter who represented Great Britain at the 2004 Summer Olympics, 2012 Summer Olympics, and 2016 Summer Olympics. Ling was born in Taunton, Somerset.

At the 2004 Summer Olympics in Athens he participated in the men's trap event, finishing tied for 25th position. In 2012, he also competed in the men's trap, finishing in 21st position. At the 2016 Summer Olympics, he won the bronze medal in the men's trap.

== Personal life ==
He is a crop farmer in Nynehead in Somerset, and also works as a shooting coach. He is married to Abbey Burton, a fellow professional shooter, and has two daughters with her.
