= Pia Lucia Baldisserri =

Italian sports shooter

Personal information
- Nationality: Italian
- Born: 23 April 1957 (age 69) Cesena, Italy

Sport
- Sport: Sports shooting

Pia Lucia Baldisserri (born 23 April 1957) is an Italian former sports shooter. She competed in the mixed trap event at the 1988 Summer Olympics.
