= Aleksandr Asanov =

Kazakhstani sports shooter (1953–2003)

Aleksandr Asanov (August 16, 1953 – May 23, 2003) was a Kazakhstani sport shooter. He was born in Kzyl-Tuz, Almaty Region. He competed at the Summer Olympics in 1980 and 1992. In 1980, he placed sixth in the mixed trap event, while in 1992, he tied for 21st place in the mixed trap event.
