= Gheorghe Enache =

Romanian sports shooter

Personal information
- Born: 22 September 1934 Bucharest, Romania
- Died: 1971 (aged 36–37)

Sport
- Sport: Sports shooting

Gheorghe Enache (22 September 1934 – 1971) was a Romanian sports shooter. He competed at the 1960 Summer Olympics and the 1964 Summer Olympics.
