= Józef Kiszkurno =

Polish sports shooter

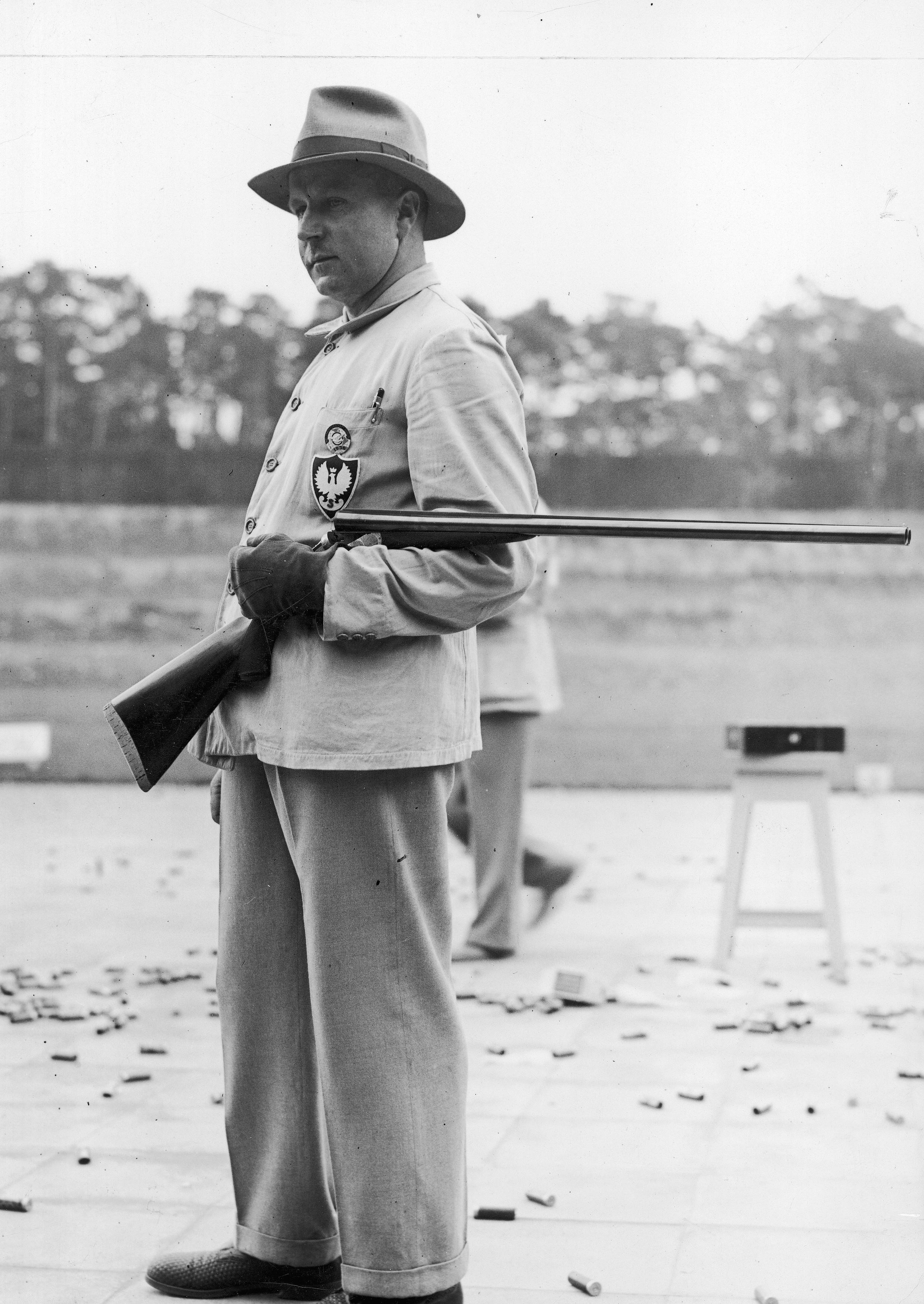

Personal information
- Born: 1 February 1895; Nowowardowszczyzna, Minsk Voblast, Russian Empire
- Died: 8 February 1981 (aged 86); Iwno, Poland

Sport
- Sport: Sports shooting

Józef Kiszkurno (1 February 1895 – 8 February 1981) was a Polish sports shooter. He competed in the trap event at the 1952 Summer Olympics.

== Biography ==
Son of Adam Kiszkurno and Maria Sycz, he attended high school in Kalisz. He represented the clubs Legia Warsaw (1928-1955), Zawisza Bydgoszcz and Ogniwo Łódź (1949-1950). Between the years 1928-1953 he won the shooting championships of Poland 19 times, in 1931 he won the championship of Europe. In 1931, 1936 and 1938 he won the world championships.

After World War II he became a shooting coach. He had a son, Zygmunt Kiszkurno, also a sport shooter who competed in the men's trap event at the 1956 Summer Olympics in Melbourne.

Józef Kiszkurno was awarded the Knight's Cross of the Order of Polonia Restituta and the Gold Cross of Merit.
