= Aleksandr Lavrinenko =

Ukrainian sport shooter

Oleksandr Lavrinenko
Personal information
- Native name: Олександр Володимирович Лавріненко
- Nationality: Ukrainian
- Born: 6 June 1961 (age 65)

Sport
- Sport: Shooting
- Event: Trap

Achievements and titles
- Olympic finals: 1988 Seoul (T25); 1992 Barcelona (T16)
Medal record
Men's Shooting
Representing Soviet Union (1988)
Representing Unified Team (1992)

Oleksandr Volodymyrovych Lavrinenko (Ukrainian: Олександр Володимирович Лавріненко; born June 6, 1961) is a Ukrainian sport shooter. He competed at the Summer Olympics in 1988 and 1992. In 1988, he tied for 25th place in the mixed trap event, and, in 1992, he tied for 16th place in the mixed trap event.
