= Rustam Yambulatov =

Soviet sport shooter

Olympic medal record

Shooting

Representing Soviet Union
Silver medal – second place	1980 Moscow	Trap

Rustam Zaynullovich Yambulatov (Russian: Рустам Зайнуллович Ямбулатов, born November 10, 1950) is a Soviet sport shooter. He won a silver medal in Trap Shooting in the 1980 Summer Olympics.
