= Luciano Giovannetti =

Italian sport shooter

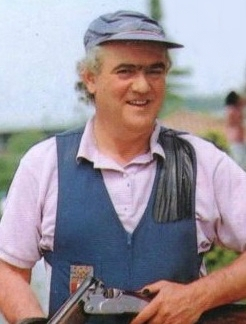

Personal information
- Nationality: Italian
- Born: 25 September 1945 (age 80) Pistoia, Italy
- Height: 175 cm (5 ft 9 in)
- Weight: 78 kg (172 lb)

Sport
- Country: Italy
- Sport: Shooting
- Event: Trap
Medal record
Men's Shooting
Gold medal – first place	1980 Moscow	Trap individual
Gold medal – first place	1984 Los Angeles	Trap individual
World Championships
Gold medal – first place	1982 Caracas	Trap individual
Gold medal – first place	1979 Montecatini	Trap team
Gold medal – first place	1982 Caracas	Trap team
Gold medal – first place	1979 Montecatini	Trap team
Silver medal – second place	1986 Shul	Trap team

Luciano Giovannetti (born 25 September 1945) is an Italian sport shooter and two-time Olympic champion. He won a gold medal in trap shooting at both the 1980 Summer Olympics and the 1984 Summer Olympics. He is the first trap shooter to successfully defend the Olympic title. He celebrated his victory in 1980 by tossing his cap into the air and shooting a hole through it.
