= Silvano Basagni =

Italian sport shooter (1938–2017)

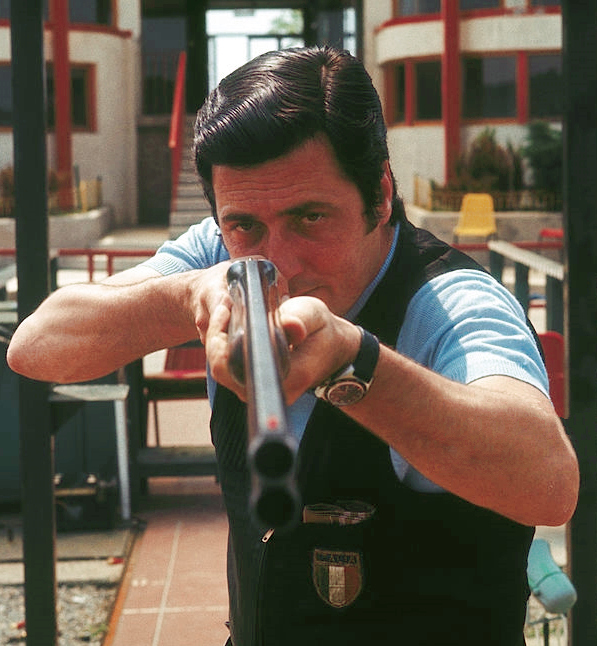
- Basagni at the 1972 Olympics

Personal information
- Born: 6 August 1938 Florence, Italy
- Died: 10 May 2017 (aged 78) Florence, Italy
- Height: 1.82 m (6 ft 0 in)
- Weight: 84 kg (185 lb)
Medal record
Representing Italy
Olympic Games
Bronze medal – third place	1972 Munich	Trap shooting

Silvano Basagni (6 August 1938 – 10 May 2017) was an Italian sport shooter. He competed in the mixed trap at the 1972, 1976 and 1980 Olympics and won a bronze medal in 1972. Basagni died on 10 May 2017 in Florence, Italy, at the age of 78.
