= List of medalists at the European Shotgun Championships =

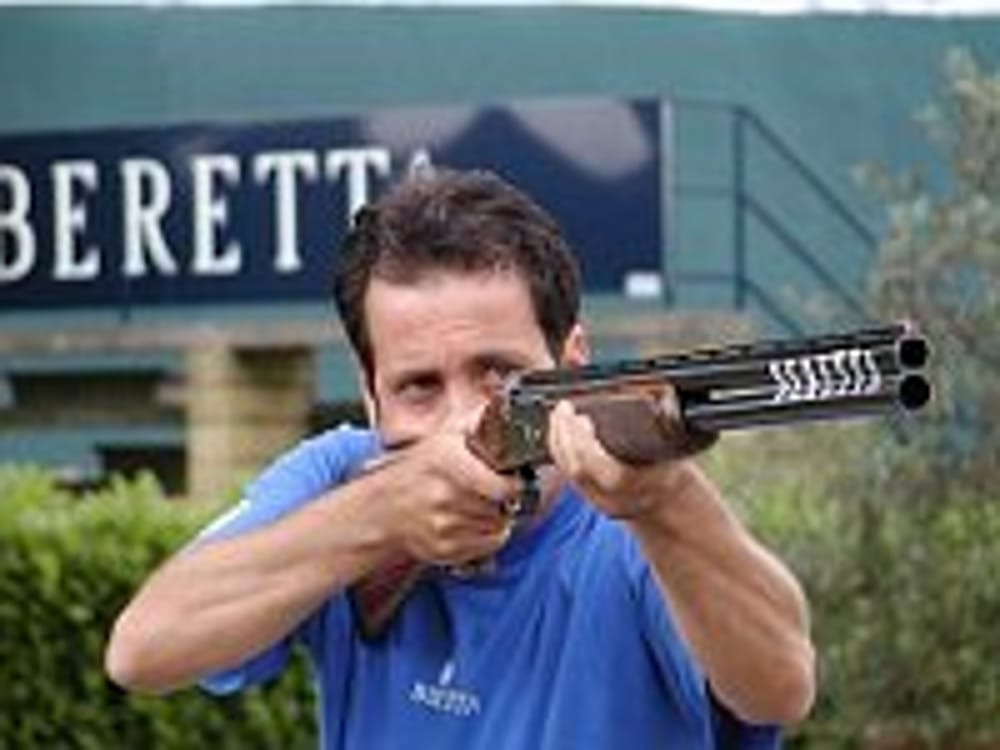
The Italian Ennio Falco, nine medals at the European Shotgun Championships.

This is the list of medalists at the European Shotgun Championships from the first edition held in 1929 (until 1954 the European Shotgun Championships were held in pigeon shooting and only from 1955, they take place in the current configuration).

== Events ==
The events have almost always been the following three male and female, individual and team. Only from the 2016 edition are there two new mixed team races in trap and skeet.

- Trap (men and women, individual and team)
- Double trap (men and women, individual and team)
- Skeet (men and women, individual and team)

== Men ==
Championships not recognized by the ISSF.

=== Trap individual ===
Year	Gold		Silver		Bronze	
Year	Athlete	Country	Athlete	Country	Athlete	Country
1929	Rudolf Sack	Germany	Fredrik Landelius	Sweden	Helmuth Keller	Germany
1930	Léon Deloy	France	Antonio Rallis	Italy	Andras Montagh	Hungary
1931	Józef Kiszkurno	Poland	Sandor Lumniczer	Hungary	Andras Montagh	Hungary
1933	Sándor Lumniczer	Hungary	Pal Dora	Hungary	Sandor Dora	Hungary
1934	Kurt Schöbel	Germany	Sándor Lumniczer	Hungary	Jean de Beaumont	France
1935	Rudolf Sack	Germany	Sándor Lumniczer	Hungary	Ludo Sheid	Belgium
1936	Gyula Halasy	Hungary	Kurt Schöbel	Germany	Jozef Kiszkurno	Poland
1937	Sándor Lumniczer	Hungary	Ake Forselles	Finland	Konrad Huber	Finland
1938	Jules Cavroy	France	Sándor Lumniczer	Hungary	Squat	Czechoslovakia
1939	Kurt Schöbel	Germany	von dem Bongart	Germany	Adolfo Manfredi	Italy
1940	Giuseppe Melini	Italy				
1949	Sándor Dóra	Hungary	Otello Marini	Italy	Italo Bellini	Italy
1950	Sándor Dóra	Hungary	Carlo Sala	Italy	Giulio Prati	Italy
1952	Sándor Dóra	Hungary	Albino Crocco	Italy	Otello Marini	Italy
1953	Giulio Prati	Italy	Galliano Rossini	Italy	Albino Crocco	Italy
1954	Galliano Rossini	Italy	Michel Prévost	France	Cesare Merlo	Italy
1955	Seifullah Ghaleb	Egypt	Galliano Rossini	Italy	Franco Ciardi	Italy
1955	Yury Nikandrov	Soviet Union	Ewald Christensen	Denmark	Nikolai Mogilewski	Soviet Union
1956	Maurice Tabet	Lebanon	Aref Diab	Lebanon	Rudolf Sack	West Germany
1957	Maurice Tabet	Lebanon	Daniele Ciceri	Italy	Sandro Ciceri	Italy
1958	Luigi Rossi	Italy	Jean Aubin	France	Heinrich von der Mühle	West Germany
1959	Joe Wheater	United Kingdom	Galliano Rossini	Italy	Ernest Fear	United Kingdom
1960	Luigi Rossi	Italy	Daniele Ciceri	Italy	Joe Wheater	United Kingdom
1961	Ernest Fear	United Kingdom	Galliano Rossini	Italy	Fernand Mahau	Belgium
1962	Edoardo Casciano	Italy	Galliano Rossini	Italy	Ennio Mattarelli	Italy
1963	Karl-Heinz Kramer	East Germany	Pavel Senitschev	Soviet Union	Galliano Rossini	Italy
1964	Ennio Mattarelli	Italy	Michel Prévost	France	Heinz Leibinger	West Germany
1965	Silvano Canonico	Italy	Ennio Mattarelli	Italy	Galliano Rossini	Italy
1966	Michel Prévost	France	Silvano Basagni	Italy	Sten Karlsson	Sweden
1967	Edoardo Casciano	Italy	Michel Carrega	France	Alexander Androschkin	Soviet Union
1968	Michel Carrega	France	Edoardo Casciano	Italy	Aleksandr Alipov	Soviet Union
1969	Jean-Jacques Baud	France	Rune Flodman	Sweden	Michel Carrega	France
1970	Aleksandr Alipov	Soviet Union	Michel Carrega	France	Serafino Giani	Italy
1971	Silvano Basagni	Italy	Eladio Vallduvi	Spain	Alexander Androschkin	Soviet Union
1972	Adam Smelczynski	Poland	Ricardo Sancho	Spain	Michel Carrega	France
1973	Eladio Vallduvi	Spain	Mario Manfredi	Italy	Burkhard Hoppe	East Germany
1974	Esteban Azkue	Spain	Silvano Basagni	Italy	Adam Smelczynski	Poland
1975	Alberto Carneroli	Italy	Silvano Basagni	Italy	Adam Smelczynski	Poland
1976	Adam Smelczynski	Poland	Kulakov	Soviet Union	Michel Carrega	France
1977	Alexander Assanov	Soviet Union	Burkhard Hoppe	East Germany	Eladio Vallduvi	Spain
1978	Burkhard Hoppe	East Germany	Silvano Basagni	Italy	Carlo Danna	Italy
1979	Burkhard Hoppe	East Germany	Alexander Assanov	Soviet Union	Jean Demarle	France
1980	Peter Croft	United Kingdom	Alexander Assanov	Soviet Union	Ubaldesco Baldi	Italy
1981	Bernard Blondeau	France	Alexander Lavrinenko	Soviet Union	Jacques Muana	France
1982	Daniele Cioni	Italy	Luciano Giovannetti	Italy	Alexander Lavrinenko	Soviet Union
1983	Matti Nummela	Finland	Alexander Assanov	Soviet Union	Johnny Påhlsson	Sweden
1984	Ricardo Sancho	Spain	Peter Blecher	West Germany	Timo Nieminen	Finland
1985	Poul Jacobsen	Denmark	Luciano Giovannetti	Italy	Guelpa	France
1986	Daniele Cioni	Italy	Alexander Lavrinenko	Soviet Union	Luciano Giovannetti	Italy
1987	Jörg Damme	East Germany	Francisco Felix	Portugal	Peter Aagaard Jensen	Denmark
1988	Albano Pera	Italy	Alexander Lavrinenko	Soviet Union	Marco Venturini	Italy
1989	Marco Venturini	Italy	Albano Pera	Italy	Alexander Lavrinenko	Soviet Union
1990	Igor Chebanov	Soviet Union	Daniele Cioni	Italy	Joao Rebelo	Portugal
1991	Xavier Bouvier	Switzerland	Istvan Putz	Hungary	Jörg Damme	Germany
1992	Marco Conti	Italy	Roberto Scalzone	Italy	Matti Nummela	Finland
1993	Frans Peeters	Belgium	Olaf Kirchstein	Germany	Peter Croft	United Kingdom
1994	Frans Peeters	Belgium	Marco Venturini	Italy	Manuel Vieira da Silva	Portugal
1995	Jörg Damme	Germany	Philippe Dupont	Belgium	Uwe Möller	Germany
1996	Ian Peel	United Kingdom	Aleksej Alipov	Russia	Thomas Fichtner	Germany
1997	Giovanni Pellielo	Italy	Daniele Cioni	Italy	Ian Peel	United Kingdom
1998	Igor Chebanov	Russia	David Kostelecký	Czech Republic	Philippe Dupont	Belgium
1999	Marco Venturini	Italy	Giovanni Pellielo	Italy	Rodolfo Vigano	Italy
2000	Joao Rebelo	Portugal	Aleksej Alipov	Russia	Giovanni Pellielo	Italy
2001	Aleksej Alipov	Russia	Giovanni Pellielo	Italy	Carlo Angelantoni	Italy
2002	David Kostelecký	Czech Republic	Marco Venturini	Italy	Tommi Andelin	Finland
2003	Yves Tronc	France	Olaf Kirchstein	Germany	Marco Venturini	Italy
2004	Alp Kizilsu	Turkey	Istvan Putz	Hungary	Stéphane Clamens	France
2005	Aleksej Alipov	Russia	Giovanni Pellielo	Italy	Stéphane Clamens	France
2006	Erminio Frasca	Italy	José Manuel Bruno Faria	Portugal	Alberto Fernandez	Spain
2007	Yves Tronc	France	Stéphane Clamens	France	Josip Glasnovic	Croatia
2008	Karsten Bindrich	Germany	David Kostelecký	Czech Republic	Jiří Lipták	Czech Republic
2009	Giovanni Pellielo	Italy	Andreas Scherhaufer	Austria	Mario Filipovic	Slovakia
2010	Alberto Fernandez	Spain	Giovanni Pellielo	Italy	Derek Burnett	Ireland
2011	Erik Varga	Slovakia	David Kostelecký	Czech Republic	Bostjan Macek	Slovenia
2012	Giovanni Cernogoraz	Croatia	Jiří Lipták	Czech Republic	Josip Glasnovic	Croatia
2013	Josip Glasnovic	Croatia	Massimo Fabbrizi	Italy	Derek Burnett	Ireland
2014	Andreas Scherhaufer	Austria	Massimo Fabbrizi	Italy	David Kostelecký	Czech Republic
2015	Giovanni Pellielo	Italy	Alberto Fernandez	Spain	Bostjan Macek	Slovenia
2016	Massimo Fabbrizi	Italy	Anton Glasnovic	Croatia	João Azevedo	Portugal
2017	Jiří Lipták	Czech Republic	Aaron Heading	United Kingdom	Mauro De Filippis	Italy
2018	Bostjan Macek	Slovenia	Anton Glasnovic	Croatia	Jiří Lipták	Czech Republic
2019	David Kostelecký	Czech Republic	Josip Glasnovic	Croatia	Giovanni Cernogoraz	Croatia

=== Trap team ===
Year	Gold	Silver	Bronze
1929	Hungary (Dóra Pál, Dóra Sándor, Sándor Lumniczer, István Strassburger)	Germany (Rudolf Sack, ...)	Finland
1931	Hungary (Pál Dóra, Sándor Dóra, Sándor Lumniczer, András Montagh)	Austria	Poland
1933	Hungary (Pál Dóra, Sándor Dóra, Sándor Lumniczer, András Montagh)	Austria	Denmark
1934	Hungary (Dóra Pál, Sándor Lumniczer, András Montagh, István Strassburger)	Germany (Kurt Schöbel, ...)	Denmark
1935	Hungary (Dóra Pál, Dóra Sándor, Sándor Lumniczer, István Strassburger)	Belgium	Germany (Rudolf Sack, ...)
1936	Hungary (Sándor Dóla, Gyula Halasy, Sándor Lumniczer, István Strassburger)	Germany (Kurt Schöbel, ...)	United Kingdom
1937	Finland (Ake by Forselles, Konrad Huber, ...)	Germany (Kurt Schöbel, Rudolf Sack, von dem Bongart, von Gramon)	France
1938	Czechoslovakia	Poland	France
1939	Germany I (Kurt Schöbel, von dem Bongart, ...)	Italy	Germany II
1952	Italy (Albino Crocco, Otello Marini, ...)	France	Spain
1954	France (Michel Prévost, ...)	West Germany	Egypt
1955	Soviet Union (Sergej Kalinjin, Nikolai Mogilewski, Yury Nikandrov, Wassili Selin)	Hungary (Karoly Kulin-Nagy, Sandor Lumniczer, Ede Szomjas, Jozsef Vary)	Poland (Roman Feill, Kazimierz Popielarski, Adam Smelczynski, Wandolin Wolny)
1956	Lebanon (Maurice Tabet, Aref Diab, ...)	Italy	Egypt
1957	Lebanon (Maurice Tabet, ....)	Italy	West Germany
1958	Germany (Heinrich von der Mühle, ...)	Italy (Luigi Rossi, ...)	France
1959	Italy (Silvano Canonico, Alessandro Ciceri, Franco Piatti, Galliano Rossini)	Soviet Union (Sergei Kalinin, Nikolai Mogilewski, Yury Nikandrov, Valentin Stjepin)	United Kingdom (Edward Fear, Victor Huthart, Glenn Jones, Joseph Wheater)
1960	Italy (Luigi Rossi, Daniele Ciceri, ...)	United Kingdom	Lebanon
1961	Italy	United Kingdom	Hungary (Keresztes, Kulin-Nagy, E. Szomjas, Vary)
1962	Italy (Edoardo Casciano, Canon, Delventisetti, Picciolo)	United States (Eisenlauer, Everhart, Myers, Ross)	France (Boniteau, Faussier, Prevost, Roux)
1963	Soviet Union (Sergej Kalinjin, Yury Nikandrov, Pavel Senitschev, Wladimir Semjanka)	East Germany (Karl-Heinz Kramer, Heinz Rehder, Hans-Joachim Marscheider, Gerhard Aßmus)	Italy (Alberto Ambrock, Ennio Mattarelli, Galliano Rossini, Angelo Scalzone)
1964	Italy (Ennio Mattarelli, ...)	Poland	West Germany (Heinz Leibinger, ...)
1965	Italy (Silvano Canonico, Ennio Mattarelli, Galliano Rossini usw.)	Soviet Union	Lebanon
1966	Italy (Silvano Basagni, ....)	Romania (Dumitrescu, ...)	France (Michel Prévost, ....)
1967	Sweden (Karlsson, ....)	France (Michel Carrega, ....)	Italy (Edoardo Casciano, ....)
1968	France (Michel Carrega, ....)	Italy	Soviet Union
1969	Italy (Silvano Basagni, Serafino Giani, Ennio Mattarelli, Galliano Rossini)	East Germany (Burkhardt Hoppe, Herbert Freude, Kurt Czekalla, Albrecht Henke)	France (Jean-Jacques Baud, Pierre Candelo, Michel Carrega, Michel Prévost)
1970	Soviet Union (Aleksandr Alipov, ....)	Italy (Serafino Giani, Silvano Basagni, Gianni Rosatti, ...)	West Germany
1971	Italy (Silvano Basagni, Luciano Bellentani, Ennio Mattarelli, Galliano Rossini)	France (Jean-Jacques Baud, Michel Carrega, Robert Porchier, Michel Prévost)	Spain (Eladio Vallduvi, José Luis Alonso, Jaime Bladas, José Cusi)
1972	Spain (Eladio Vallduvi, Bladas, Allonso, Sancho)	Poland (Adam Smelczynski, ....)	France (Michel Carrega, ....)
1973	France (Jean-Jacques Baud, .....)	Spain (Eladio Vallduvi, ....)	Italy (Manfredi, .....)
1974	Italy (Silvano Basagni, ....)	Spain (Esteban Azkue, ....)	Soviet Union
1975	Italy (Alberto Carneroli, Silvano Basagni, Scalzone, Baldi)	Belgium (Renard, Permentier, Colon, Niessen)	Spain (Sancho, Bladas, Eladio Vallduvi, Azcue)
1976	France (Michel Carrega, Bernard Blondeau, .....)	Soviet Union (Kulakov, ....)	Spain
1977	Soviet Union (Alexander Assanov, Kulakow, ...)	East Germany (Jürgen Henke, Burkhardt Hoppe, Steffen Hummel, Wilhelm Metelmann)	Spain (Eladio Vallduvi, Azkue, ...)
1978	Italy (Alberto Carneroli, Silvano Basagni, Luciano Giovannetti, Danna)	East Germany (Burkhard Hoppe, Wilfreid Hummel, Jürgen Heym, Herbert Hirschmüller)	Spain
1979	Soviet Union (Alexander Assanov, Galkin, Rustam Jambulatow, Ochotzki)	Finland	France (Demarle, Bernard Blondeau, ....)
1980	Spain (Eladio Vallduvi, ...)	Italy (Baldi, Carlo Danna, ....)	Soviet Union (Alexander Assanov, .....)
1981	Soviet Union (Alexander Assanov, Ochotzki, Alexander Lavrinenko, Rustam Jambulatow)	Italy	France (Bernard Blondeau, Moine, ..)
1982	Soviet Union (Alexander Lavrinenko, .....)	Italy (Daniele Cioni, Giovannetti, ....)	United Kingdom
1983	Italy (Daniele Cioni, Carlo Danna, Marco Vaccari)	France (Michel Carrega, Blein, Mahaut)	Finland (Nieminen, Matti Nummela, Palmu)
1984	Spain (Ricardo Sancho, Miguel, ..)	Italy (Silvano Basagni, ....)	United Kingdom (Peel, ....)
1985	Italy (Luciano Giovannetti, Daniele Cioni, ...)	Soviet Union (Alexander Assanov, Monachow, ...)	Spain
1986	Italy (Luciano Giovannetti, Daniele Cioni, ...)	Soviet Union (Alexander Lavrinenko, .....)	France (Guelpa, ....)
1987	Italy (Luciano Giovannetti, Albano Pera, .....)	Soviet Union	Spain (Eladio Vallduvi, ...)
1988	Soviet Union (Alexander Lavrinenko, Monachow, Saaliste)	Italy (Giovannetti, Albano Pera, Marco Venturini)	France (Guelpa, Bernard Blondeau, Gerin )
1989	Italy (Marco Venturini, Albano Pera, .....)	Portugal	Soviet Union (Alexander Lavrinenko, ......)
1990	Italy (Daniele Cioni, Albano Pera, Marco Venturini)	Soviet Union (Igor Chebanov, ....)	Czechoslovakia
1991	Italy (Albano Pera, Giovanni Pellielo, Marco Venturini)	Hungary (Istvan Putz, .....)	Soviet Union
1992	Italy (Roberto Scalzone, Marco Conti, Albano Pera)	Portugal	United Kingdom
1993	Germany (Jörg Damme, Olaf Kirchstein, Uwe Möller)	Italy	Hungary
1994	Italy (Marco Venturini, Giovanni Pellielo, Roberto Scalzone)	Portugal (Manuel Vieira da Silva, .....)	Belgium (Frans Peeters, .....)
1995	Germany (Jörg Damme, Uwe Möller, Karsten Bindrich)	Italy	Denmark
1996	United Kingdom (Ian Peel, ......)	Russia (Aleksej Alipov, ....)	France
1997	Italy (Giovanni Pellielo, Daniele Cioni, Rodolfo Vigano)	Portugal (Joao Rebelo, Manuel Silva, Jose Silva)	France (Jean Ane, Jean-Michel Lucas, Tony Navarro)
1998	Germany (Waldemar Schanz, Karsten Bindrich, Thomas Fichtner)	Russia (Igor Chebanov, Aleksej Alipov, Sergej Ljubomirow)	Czech Republic (David Kostelecký, Jiří Gach, Pavel Kubec)
1999	Italy (Rodolfo Vigano, Marco Venturini, Giovanni Pellielo)	Portugal (Jose Silva, Manuel Lourenco, Joao Rebelo)	United Kingdom (James Birkett-Evans, Peter Boden, Ian Peel)
2000	Italy (Rodolfo Vigano, Marco Venturini, Giovanni Pellielo)	Portugal (Manuel Silva, Ezequiel Custodio, Joao Rebelo)	United Kingdom (Kevin Gill, Peter Boden, Ian Peel)
2001	Italy (Carlo Angelantoni, Marco Venturini, Giovanni Pellielo)	Germany (Waldemar Schanz, Karsten Bindrich, Olaf Kirchstein)	France (Stephane Clamens, Yves Tronc, Bruno Croiset)
2002	Italy (Rodolfo Vigano, Marco Venturini, Giovanni Pellielo)	Czech Republic (David Kostelecký, Jan Dvořák, Pavel Kubec)	Germany (Waldemar Schanz, Karsten Bindrich, Olaf Kirchstein)
2003	France (Yves Tronc, Stephane Clamens, Jean-Pierre Chavassieux)	Germany (Olaf Kirchstein, Karsten Bindrich, Stefan Rüttgeroth)	Italy (Marco Venturini, Massimo Fabbrizi, Massimiliano Mola)

=== Double trap individual ===
Year	Gold		Silver		Bronze	
Year	Athlete	Country	Athlete	Country	Athlete	Country
1991	Fabio Casadei	Italy	Ercole Buffoli	Italy	Marten Sörensen	Denmark
1992	Alp Kizilsu	Turkey	Kevin Gill	United Kingdom	Zoltan Bodo	Hungary
1993	Albano Pera	Italy	Mirco Cenci	Italy	Servet Sivrikaya	Turkey
1994	Karoly Gombos	Hungary	Albano Pera	Italy	Waldemar Schanz	Germany
1995	Daniele di Spigno	Italy	Raimo Kauppila	Finland	Mirco Cenci	Italy
1996	Claudio Franzoni	Italy	Ugo Procacci	Italy	Aki Reijonen	Finland
1997	Richard Faulds	United Kingdom	Raimo Kauppila	Finland	Daniele di Spigno	Italy
1998	Waldemar Schanz	Germany	Richard Faulds	United Kingdom	Daniele di Spigno	Italy
1999	Daniele di Spigno	Italy	Raimo Kauppila	Finland	Mirco Cenci	Italy
2000	Wassili Mossin	Russia	Jean-Paul Gros	France	Emanuele Bernasconi	Italy
2001	Daniele di Spigno	Italy	Marco Innocenti	Italy	Roland Gerebics	Hungary
2002	Daniele di Spigno	Italy	Emanuele Bernasconi	Italy	Raimo Kauppila	Finland
2003	Hakan Dahlby	Sweden	Marco Innocenti	Italy	Richard Faulds	United Kingdom

=== Double trap team ===
Year	Gold	Silver	Bronze
1991	Italy (Fabio Casadei, Frapporti, Enrico Buffoli)	United Kingdom	Soviet Union
1992	Turkey (Alp Kizilsu, ....)	United Kingdom (Kevin Gill, .....)	Belgium
1993	Italy (Albano Pera, Mirco Cenci, Enrrico Buffoli)	Finland	Russia
1994	Italy (Albano Pera, Marco Cenci, Enrico Buffoli)	Germany (Waldemar Schanz, Karsten Bindrich, Steffen Däbel)	Hungary (Karoly Gombos, .......)
1995	Italy (Daniele di Spigno, Mirco Cenci, .......)	Finland (Raimo Kauppila, .....)	United Kingdom
1996	Italy (Claudio Franzoni, Ugo Procacci, ......)	Finland (Aki Reijonen, ....)	Sweden
1997	Italy (Daniele Di Spigno, Claudio Franzoni, Stefano Mezzetta)	Finland (Raimo Kauppila, Joonas Olkkonen, Kari Riekko)	Spain (Sergio Pinero, Alfredo Rodriguez, Joseba Zubizarreta)
1998	Italy (Daniele di Spigno, Luca Marini, Emanuele Bernasconi)	France (Jean-Paul Gros, Marc Menessier, Yves Tronc)	Belgium (Luc Budts, Philippe Dupont, Frans Peeters)
1999	Italy (Mirco Cenci, Daniele Di Spigno, Luca Marini)	France (Jean-Paul Gros, Marc Menessier, Yves Tronc)	Finland (Raimo Kauppila, Joonas Olkkonen, Aki Reijonen)
2000	Russia (Wassili Mossin, Witali Fokejew, Aleksej Alipov)	Finland (Raimo Kauppila, Joonas Olkkonen, Mikko Makitalo)	United Kingdom (Richard Faulds, Charles Dean, John Bellamy)
2001	Italy (Mirco Cenci, Daniele Di Spigno, Marco Innocenti)	Finland (Raimo Kauppila, Joonas Olkkonen, Mikko Makitalo)	Spain (Sergio Pinero, Alfredo Rodriguez, Lorenzo Santana)
2002	Italy (Emanuele Bernasconi, Daniele Di Spigno, Marco Innocenti)	France (Jean-Paul Gros, Marc Menessier, Eric Varenne)	Russia (Vasily Mossin, Vitaly Fokeev, Vyacheslav Duchkin)
2003	United Kingdom (Richard Faulds, George Digweed, John Bellamy)	Italy (Marco Innocenti, Daniele Di Spigno, Emanuele Bernasconi)	Russia (Vasily Mossin, Vitaly Fokeev, Vyacheslav Duchkin)

=== Skeet individual ===
Year	Gold		Silver		Bronze	
Year	Athlete	Country	Athlete	Country	Athlete	Country
1954	Jacques Saint-Rémy	France	Ali Riad	Egypt	Pierre Ribes	France
1955	Nikolai Durnjew	Soviet Union	Olle Andersson	Sweden	Vasily Antonov	Soviet Union
1955	Jack Palmer	United States	Ali Riad	Egypt	Rudy Etchen	United States
1956	Albert Voisin	France	Georges Christides	Greece	Guy de Valle Flor	Belgium
1957	Michel Taris	France	Waddel Smith	United States	Ludo Sheid	Belgium
1958	Ernest Mayer	Switzerland	Jacques Arnavielhe	France	Claude Foussier	France
1959	Nikolai Durniev	Soviet Union	Arne Ewertsson	Sweden	Claes Alwen	Sweden
1960	P.A. Gilchrist	Canada	Geuens game	Belgium	Claude Foussier	France
1961	Gösta Klingspor	Sweden	Jacques Henrijean	Belgium	Claude Foussier	France
1962	John Sistovaris	Greece	Jacques Herberich	France	Robert Melinette	France
1963	Oleg Lossew	Soviet Union	Yuri Churanov	Soviet Union	Konrad Wirnhier	West Germany
1964	Yuri Churanov	Soviet Union	Wadim Vorobiev	Soviet Union	Hans-Joachim Suppli	West Germany
1965	Nikolai Durnjew	Soviet Union	Haymo Rethwisch	West Germany	Lennart Standar	Sweden
1966	Nikolai Durnjew	Soviet Union	Yevgeny Petrov	Soviet Union	Jewgeni Kondratiev	Soviet Union
1967	Jean-Paul Faber	France	Olgierd Korolkiewicz	Poland	Konrad Wirnhier	West Germany
1968	Konrad Wirnhier	West Germany	Karl Meyer zu Hölsen	West Germany	Rudolf Poljanski	Soviet Union
1969	Elie Penot	France	Yevgeny Petrov	Soviet Union	Nikolai Benesch	Soviet Union
1970	Andrzej Socharski	Poland	Yevgeny Petrov	Soviet Union	Konrad Wirnhier	West Germany
1971	Anders Karlsson	Sweden	Wieslaw Gawlikowski	Poland	Yevgeny Petrov	Soviet Union
1972	Vladimir Andreev	Soviet Union	Yevgeny Petrov	Soviet Union	Yuri Churanov	Soviet Union
1973	Tariel Shgenti	Soviet Union	Ole Riber Rasmussen	Denmark	Francis Cornet	Belgium
1974	Jean Petitpied	France	Wieslaw Gawlikowski	Poland	Westergard	Finland
1975	Ole Riber Rasmussen	Denmark	Wieslaw Gawlikowski	Poland	Eric Swinkels	Netherlands
1976	Juan Avalos	Spain	Sucharski	Poland	Oster	Romania
1977	Alijew	Soviet Union	Westergard	Finland	Josef Panáček	Czechoslovakia
1978	Romano Garagnani	Italy	Talabos	Hungary	Alijew	Soviet Union
1979	Bruno Rosetti	France	Ole Justesen	Denmark	Enrique Camarena	Spain
1980	Josef Panáček	Czechoslovakia	Bruno Rosetti	France	Paul Bentley	United Kingdom
1981	Tariel Shgenti	Soviet Union	Guy Rocheteau	France	Tamas Imnaischwili	Soviet Union
1982	Bruno Rosetti	France	Penot	France	Luboš Adamec	Czechoslovakia
1983	Bernhard Hochwald	West Germany	Mecocci	Italy	Rasmussen	Denmark
					Timoschin	Soviet Union
1984	Jan Hůla	Czechoslovakia	Valeri Timoshin	Soviet Union	Tamas Imnaischwili	Soviet Union
1985	Björn Thorwaldsson	Sweden	Tamas Imnaischwili	Soviet Union	Bernhard Hochwald	West Germany
1986	C. Giardini	Italy	Luca Scribani Rossi	Italy	Ludvigsson	Sweden
1987	Alexander Cherkassov	Soviet Union	Kiek van Ieperen	Netherlands	Valeri Timoshin	Soviet Union
1988	Jean Dellac	France	Jorge Guardiola	Spain	Herbert Seeberger	West Germany
1989	Bruno Rossetti	Italy	Luboš Adamec	Czechoslovakia	Björn Thorwaldsson	Sweden
1990	Bruno Rossetti	Italy	Luboš Adamec	Czechoslovakia	Hennie Dompeling	Netherlands
1991	Axel Wegner	Germany	Luboš Adamec	Czechoslovakia	Hennie Dompeling	Netherlands
1992	Bronislav Bechyňský	Czechoslovakia	Jorma Korhonen	Finland	Matthias Dunkel	Germany
1993	Harald Jensen	Norway	Paal Kraakens	Norway	Ole Rasmussen	Denmark
1994	Andrea Benelli	Italy	Bronislav Bechyňský	Czech Republic	Hennie Dompeling	Netherlands
1995	Antonis Andreou	Cyprus	Hennie Dompeling	Netherlands	Bernhard Hochwald	Germany
1996	Jürgen Raabe	Germany	Juri Stolypin	Belarus	Grzegorz Chrzanowski	Poland
1997	Antonis Andreou	Cyprus	Andy Austin	United Kingdom	Ennio Falco	Italy
1998	Bronislav Bechyňský	Czech Republic	Oleg Tichin	Russia	Gijs van Beek	Netherlands
1999	Bronislav Bechyňský	Czech Republic	Mikola Miltschev	Ukraine	Petr Halek	Czech Republic
2000	Pietro Genga	Italy	Jan Sychra	Czech Republic	Andrea Benelli	Italy
2001	Ennio Falco	Italy	Andrzej Glyda	Poland	Harald Jensen	Norway
2002	Ennio Falco	Italy	Axel Wegner	Germany	Jan Sychra	Czech Republic
2003	Ennio Falco	Italy	Michael Nielsen	Denmark	Axel Wegner	Germany

=== Skeet team ===
Year	Gold	Silver	Bronze
1956	France (Albert Voisin, ...)	Lebanon	Spain
1957	France	Belgium	United States
1958	France	United States	Sweden
1959	Soviet Union (Vasily Antonov, Nikolai Durniev, Arkadi Kaplun, Oleg Lossew)	Sweden (Claes Alwen, Arne Ewertsson, Harald Grennard, Adolf Hellström)	France (Jacques Arnavielhe, Henri Boucher, Lucien Dutourleau, Claude Foussier)
1960	France (Claude Foussier, ...)	Canada	not forgiven
1961	France	Venezuela	West Germany (Konrad Wirnhier, ...)
1962	France	Lebanon	United Arab Emirates
1963	Soviet Union (Yuri Churanov, Nikolai Durniev, Arkady Kaplun, Alexander Petrov)	West Germany (Konrad Wirnhier, Karl Gernandt, Edgar Hollunder, Hans-Joachim Suppli)	Sweden (Kurt Isgren, Sven Pettersson, Bo Runesson, Lennart Standar)
1964	Soviet Union (Yuri Churanov, Vadim Vorobiev, ...)	France	West Germany (Hans-Joachim Suppli, ...)
1965	Soviet Union (Nikolai Durniev, ....)	West Germany (Haymo Rethwisch, ...)	Belgium
1966	Soviet Union (Nikolai Durniev, ....)	Romania	Finland
1967	Soviet Union (Nikolai Durniev, Yevgeny Kondratiev, ....)	West Germany (Konrad Wirnhier, .....)	France (Jean-Paul Faber, ....)
1968	West Germany (Konrad Wirnhier, Karl Meyer zu Hölsen, .....)	Poland	Denmark
1969	Soviet Union (Nikolai Benes, Boris Bulba, Yuri Churanov, Yevgeny Petrov)	France (Jean-Paul Faber, Jacques Herberich, Elie Penot, Alain Planté)	Poland (Wlodzimierz Danek, Wieslaw Gawlikowski, Olgierd Korolkiewicz, Artur Rogowski)
1970	West Germany (Konrad Wirnhier, .....)	Poland (Andrzej Socharski, ...)	Italy
1971	Spain (Juan Avalos, Gaspar Castanon Teus, Miguel Marina, José Luis Martinez)	East Germany (Michael Buchheim, Klaus Krumpholz, Klaus Schulze, Klaus Reschke)	Italy (Loris Beccheroni, Ercole Casadio, Floriano de Angeli, Romano Garagnani)
1972	Soviet Union (Yuri Churanov, Sedinkin, Tariel Shgenti, Yevgeny Petrov)	Denmark (Steffensen, ....)	Poland (Wieslaw Gawlikowski, .....)
1973	Soviet Union (Tariel Shgenti, Vladimir Andreev, etc.)	Poland (Wieslaw Gawlikowski, .....)	Czechoslovakia
1974	Soviet Union (Benesk, Sokolow, Tariel Shgenti, ....)	Denmark	France (Jean Petitpied, .....)
1975	Sweden	Soviet Union (Aliyev, ....)	Poland (Wieslaw Gawlikowski, .....)
1976	Denmark	Spain (Juan Avalos, ....)	Poland (Sucharski, ....)
1977	Soviet Union (Aliyev, ....)	Czechoslovakia (Josef Panáček, Pulda, ....)	Poland (Wieslaw Gawlikowski, .....)
1978	Soviet Union (Aliyev, Tomas Imnaischwili, Sokolow, Jeselewitsch)	Italy (Romano Garagnani, ....)	Czechoslovakia
1979	Netherlands (Eric Swinkels, van de Berg, ..)	Czechoslovakia	France
1980	Soviet Union (Tomas Imnaischwili, ....)	France	Spain
1981	Soviet Union (Tomas Imnaischwili, Tariel Shgenti, Schachworostow, Pjak )	France (Bruno Rosetti, Petipied, Rocheteau, Tisset)	Czechoslovakia (Josef Panáček, Luboš Adamec, Pulda, Hůla)
1982	Czechoslovakia (Luboš Adamec, ......)	Soviet Union	East Germany (Axel Krämer, ......)
1983	Soviet Union (Schachworostow, Timoschin, Molchanov)	France (Bruno Rosetti, Penot, Tyssier)	Sweden (Ek, Bengtsson, Berglund)
1984	Soviet Union (Timoschin, Tomas Imnaischwili, ...)	Czechoslovakia (Jan Hůla, Bronislav Bechyňský, ...)	Italy (Cianfarini, ...)
1985	Soviet Union (Tomas Imnaischwili, ....)	Italy (Benelli, .....)	East Germany (Bernhard Hochwald, Axel Wegner, Frank Garling)
1986	Italy (Giardini, Luca Scribani, ....)	East Germany (Matthias Dunkel, Bernhard Hochwald, Axel Wegner)	Soviet Union
1987	Soviet Union (Alexander Cherkassov, Valeria Timoshin, Tomas Imnaischvili)	Netherlands (Kiek van Ieperen, .....)	East Germany (Axel Wegner, Matthias Dunkel, Bernhard Hochwald)
1988	Czechoslovakia (Leoš Hlaváček, Petr Málek, Luboš Adamec)	East Germany (Bernhard Hochwald, Axel Wegner, Jürgen Raabe)	Italy (Benelli, Gionnannagel, Giardini)
1989	Netherlands	Czechoslovakia	Finland
1990	Finland	Italy (Bruno Rossetti, .....)	Sweden
1991	Czechoslovakia (Luboš Adamec, .....)	Italy	Soviet Union
1992	Germany (Axel Wegner, Bernd Hochwald, Matthias Dunkel)	Czechoslovakia (Bronislav Bechyňský, ....)	Finland (Jorma Korhonen, ....)
1993	Norway (Harald Jensen, Paal Kraakenes, ....)	Italy	Russia
1994	Italy (Andrea Benelli, Ennio Falco, Bruno Rossetti)	Czech Republic (Bronislav Bechyňský, ........)	Sweden
1995	Italy	France	Cyprus (Antonis Andreou, ....)
1996	Germany (Jürgen Raabe, Peter Schulz, Axel Wegner)	Poland (Grzegorz Chrzanowski, ......)	Czech Republic
1997	Czech Republic (Bronislav Bechyňský, Leoš Hlaváček, Petr Málek)	Cyprus (Antonis Andreou, Christos Kourtellas, Antonis Nicolaides)	Italy (Ennio Falco, Andrea Benelli, Sergio Forlano)
1998	Russia (Oleg Tichin, Alexej Wetoch, Nikolai Teoplij)	Czech Republic (Bronislav Bechyňský, Petr Málek, Jan Sychra)	Italy (Ennio Falco, Andrea Benelli, Eugenio Corti)
1999	Czech Republic (Bronislav Bechyňský, Petr Málek, Leoš Hlaváček)	Netherlands (Hennie Dompeling, Martin van Alenburg, Gijs van Beek)	Sweden (Thomas Johansson, Göran Magnusson, Urban Söderholm)
2000	Italy (Ennio Falco, Andrea Benelli, Pietro Genga)	Cyprus (Antonis Andreou, George Achilleos, Kyrlacos Christoforou)	Czech Republic ( Jan Sychra, Petr Málek, Leoš Hlaváček)
2001	Italy (Ennio Falco, Andrea Benelli, Pietro Genga)	Norway (Harald Jensen, Tore Brovold, Erik Watndahl)	Czech Republic (Jan Sychra, Petr Málek, Leoš Hlaváček)
2002	Norway (Harald Jensen, Tore Brovold, Erik Watndahl)	Germany (Jan-Henrik Heinrich, Bernhard Hochwald, Axel Wegner)	Czech Republic (Jan Sychra, David Valter, Leoš Hlaváček)
2003	Germany (Axel Wegner, Tino Wenzel, Thorsten Hapke)	Denmark (Michael Nielsen, Jens Winther, Röland Schultz)	Italy (Ennio Falco, Pietro Genga, Andrea Benelli)

== Women ==
=== Trap individual ===
Year	Gold		Silver		Bronze	
Year	Athlete	Country	Athlete	Country	Athlete	Country
1954	Louise Renault	France	Yvette Paris	France		
1955	Mirelotte Ickes	United States	Sami	ONE		
1957	Brigitte Bar	France				
1958	Olga Tzavara	Greece	Marie Greuzard	France	Berlaimont	France
1959	Olga Tzavara	Greece	Botta	Switzerland		
1960	Olga Tzavara	Greece	Marie Préaux	Belgium	Patricia Kirk-Johnson	United States
1961	Olga Tzavara	Greece	Jacqueline Robert	Belgium	Christiane Stéphane	France
1962	Olga Tzavara	Greece	Lucia Eisenlauer	United States	Michele Bassoul	Lebanon
1963	Valentina Gerasina	Soviet Union	Liselotte Forgeot	France	Christiane Hugenot	France
1964	Christiane Stéphane	France	Michele Delaire	France	Valentina Gerasina	Soviet Union
1965	Michèle Delaire	France	Valentina Gerasina	Soviet Union	Wera Werigina	Soviet Union
1966	Valentina Gerasina	Soviet Union	Christiane Stéphane	France	Michele Delaire	France
1967	Elisabeth von Soden	West Germany	Wera Werigina	Soviet Union	Valentina Gerasina	Soviet Union
1968	Elisabeth von Soden	West Germany	Valentina Gerasina	Soviet Union	Francoise Robrolle	France
1969	Elisabeth von Soden	West Germany	Francoise Robrolle	France	Liselotte Forgeot	France
1970	Elisabeth von Soden	West Germany	Julia Sidorova	Soviet Union	Valentina Gerasina	Soviet Union
1971	Elda Rolandi	Italy	Valentina Gerasina	Soviet Union	Galina Tschomutova	Soviet Union
1972	Maria Gonzales de Riona	Spain	Beate Roselius	West Germany	Kerstin Hansson	Sweden
1973	Julia Klekova	Soviet Union	Elda Rolandi	Italy	Marie-Pierrette Jacquet	France
1974	Francoise Robrolle	France	Elda Rolandi	Italy	Elisabeth von Soden	West Germany
1975	Elisabeth von Soden	West Germany	Garcia	Spain	Valentina Gerasina	Soviet Union
1976	Julia Klekova	Soviet Union	Marie-Pierrette Jacquet	France	Valentina Gerasina	Soviet Union
1977	Valentina Gerasina	Soviet Union	Julia Klekova	Soviet Union	Larissa Tyushkina	Soviet Union
1978	Julia Klekova	Soviet Union	Larissa Tyushkina	Soviet Union	Valentina Sergeta	Soviet Union
1979	Barbara Lynch	United Kingdom	Elda Rolandi	Italy	Valentina Sergeta	Soviet Union
1980	Julia Klekova	Soviet Union	Elda Rolandi	Italy	Gesine Heller	Switzerland
1981	Wanda Gentiletti	Italy	Ludmilla Wolodina	Soviet Union	Yelena Rabaya	Soviet Union
1982	Yelena Rabaya	Soviet Union	Elda Rolandi	Italy	Pia Baldisserri	Italy
1983	Yelena Rabaya	Soviet Union	Colavito	France	Ludmilla Wolodina	Soviet Union
1984	Yelena Rabaya	Soviet Union	Carmen von Bothmer	West Germany	Yelena Schevsova	Soviet Union
1985	Pia Baldisserri	Italy	Satu Pusila	Finland	Silke Hüsing	West Germany
1986	Lyudmyla Nikandrova	Soviet Union	Pia Baldisserri	Italy	Yelena Rabaya	Soviet Union
1987	Roberta Pelosi	Italy	Satu Pusila	Finland	Svetlana Lasarewa	Soviet Union
1988	Daina Gudzinevičiūtė	Soviet Union	Elda Rolandi	Italy	Satu Pusila	Finland
1989	Gema Usieto	Spain	Yelena Rabaya	Soviet Union	Roberta Morara	Italy
1990	Yelena Rabaya	Soviet Union	Satu Pusila	Finland	Maja Gubjewa	Soviet Union
1991	Yelena Rabaya	Soviet Union	Mauricette Colavito	France	Blazquez Usieto	Spain
1992	Yelena Rabaya	Unified Team	Roberta Pelosi	Italy	Daina Gudzinevičiūtė	Lithuania
1993	Gemma Usieto	Spain	Satu Pusila	Finland	Viktoria Schiko	Ukraine
1994	Satu Pusila	Finland	Blue Beach Tree	Finland	Roberta Pelosi	Italy
1995						
1996	Cristina Bocca	Italy	Roberta Pelosi	Italy	Susanne Kiermayer	Germany
1997	Anne Focan	Belgium	Susanne Kiermayer	Germany	Cristina Bocca	Italy
1998	Satu Pusila	Finland	Susanne Kiermayer	Germany	Roberta Pelosi	Italy
1999	Irina Laritscheva	Russia	Giula Iannotti	Italy	Roberta Pelosi	Italy
2000	Anne Focan	Belgium	Roberta Pelosi	Italy	Susanne Kiermayer	Germany
2001	Yelena Tkatsch	Russia	Maria Zub	Russia	Giulia Pintor	Italy
2002	Maria Quintanal	Spain	Satu Pusila	Finland	Emanuela Felici	San Marino
2003	Maria Quintanal	Spain	Yelena Tkatsch	Russia	Sarah Gibbins	United Kingdom

=== Trap team ===
Year	Gold	Silver	Bronze
1973	Soviet Union (Julia Klekova, Wheat, Senitscheva)	Italy	France
1974	West Germany (Elisabeth von Soden, Marlene Caspary, Beate Roselius)	France (Francoise Robrolle, ...)	Soviet Union
1975	West Germany (Elisabeth von Soden, ...)	Soviet Union (Valentina Gerasina, Ukolova, ...)	Spain (Garcia, ...)
1976	Soviet Union (Julia Klekova, Valentina Gerasina, Ukulova)	Spain	France (Jacquet, ...)
1977	Soviet Union (Julia Klekova, Valentina Gerasina, Larissa Tjuschkina )	France (Jacquet, ...)	Spain (Munoz, .....)
1978	Soviet Union (Julia Klekova, Larissa Tjuschkina, Sergeta )	Italy (Wanda Gentiletti, ....)	West Germany (Silke Hüsing, Carmen Richter, ...)
1979	Soviet Union (Chlebnikova, ...)	Italy (Elda Rolandi, ...)	Spain
1980	Soviet Union (Julia Klekova, ...)	Italy (Elda Rolandi, Gentiletti, ...)	Spain
1981	Soviet Union (Wolodina, Yelena Rabaya, Pitschugina)	Italy (Wanda Gentiletti, Baldisserri, Pelosi)	Spain (Munoz, Garcia, Gonzales)
1983	Soviet Union (Yelena Rabaya, Wolodina, Svetlana Lasarewa)	Italy (Baldisserri, Morara, Nobile)	Spain (Munoz, Garcia, Palazon)
1984	Soviet Union (Yelena Rabaya, Schevsova, ....)	France	Italy
1985	Italy (Pia Baldisserri, ....)	Spain	France
1986	Italy (Pia Baldisserri, ....)	France	Spain
1987	Italy (Roberta Pelosi. ....)	France	Soviet Union (Svetlana Lasarewa, ....)
1988	Soviet Union (Daina Gudzinevičiūtė, Yelena Rabaya, .....)	Italy (Elda Rolandi, .....)	France (Renaud, .....)
1989	Spain (Gema Usieto, Palazow, ....)	Italy (Roberta Morara, .....)	Finland
1990	Soviet Union (Yelena Rabaya, Maja Gubjewa, ......)	Spain	Italy
1991	France (Mauricette Colavito, ....)	Soviet Union (Yelena Rabaya, ....)	Italy
1992	CIS (Yelena Rabaya, Yelena Tkatsch, Wolkova)	France	Italy
1993	Spain (Gemma Usieto, Pelason, Quintanal)	Ukraine (Viktoria Schiko, ....)	Germany (Susanne Kiermayer, Silke Hüsing, Petra Knetemann)
1994	Finland (Satu Pusila, Sini Rantapu, P. Julin)	Germany (Silke Hüsing, Petra Knetemann, Susanne Kiermayer)	Italy (Roberta Pelosi, .....)
1995			
1996	Italy (Cristina Bocca, Roberta Pelosi, .....)	France	Finland
1997	Germany (Susanne Kiermayer, Silke Hüsing, Petra Knetemann)	Italy (Cristina Bocca, Roberta Pelosi, Paola Tattini )	France (Annabelle Allaoua, Gisele Renaud, Yolande Vidal)
1998	Italy (Roberta Pelosi, Cristina Bocca, Giulia Iannotti)	Finland (Satu Pusila, Satu Makela, Pug Veromaa)	Russia (Irina Laritscheva, Yelena Rabaya, Maria Wolkova)
1999	Russia (Maria Wolkova, Irina Laritscheva, Yelena Tkatsch)	Italy (Roberta Pelosi, Giulia Iannotti, Cristina Bocca)	France (Delphine Racinet, Gisele Renaud, Yolande Vidal)
2000	Italy (Roberta Pelosi, Giulia Iannotti, Cristina Bocca)	Germany (Susanne Kiermayer, Silke Hüsing, Sonja Scheibl)	Russia (Yelena Rabaya, Irina Laritscheva, Yelena Tkatsch)
2001	Russia (Maria Zub, Irina Laritscheva, Yelena Tkatsch)	Italy (Roberta Pelosi, Giulia Iannotti, Giulia Pintor)	Germany (Susanne Kiermayer, Silke Hüsing, Sonja Scheibl)
2002	Russia (Maria Zub, Irina Laritscheva, Yelena Tkatsch)	Spain (Vanessa Leon, Vanessa Majuelo, Maria Quintanal)	United Kingdom (Sarah Gibbins, Lesley Goddard, Anita North)
2003	United Kingdom (Anita North, Sarah Gibbins, Lesley Goddard)	Spain (Maria Quintanal, Vanessa Leon, Vanesa Majuelo)	Russia (Yelena Tkatsch, Maria Sub, Irina Laritscheva)

=== Double trap individual ===
Year	Gold		Silver		Bronze	
Year	Athlete	Country	Athlete	Country	Athlete	Country
1991	Yelena Rabaya	Soviet Union	Mauricette Colavito	France	Giselle Renaud	France
1992	Sini Rantapu	Finland	Daina Gudzinevičiūtė	Lithuania	Yelena Rabaya	Unified Team
1993	Satu Pusila	Finland	Deborah Gelisio	Italy	Anna-Maria di Giovanni	Italy
1994	Deborah Gelisio	Italy	Riita-Mari Murtoniemi	Finland	Svetlana Demina	Finland
1995	Riita-Mari Murtoniemi	Finland	Giovanna Pasello	Italy	Gema Usieto	Spain
1996	Nadia Innocenti	Italy	Susanne Kiermayer	Germany	Anne Focan	Belgium
1997	Anne Focan	Belgium	Pia Julin	Finland	Arianna Perilli	Italy
1998	Pia Julin	Finland	Susanne Kiermayer	Germany	Deborah Gelisio	Italy
1999	Susanne Kiermayer	Germany	Pia Hansen	Sweden	Deborah Gelisio	Italy
2000	Susanne Kiermayer	Germany	Pia Julin	Finland	Pia Hansen	Sweden
2001	Deborah Gelisio	Italy	Pia Hansen	Sweden	Susanne Kiermayer	Germany
2002	Deborah Gelisio	Italy	Pia Nyback	Finland	Pia Hansen	Sweden
2003	Maria Quintanal	Spain	Yelena Rabaya	Russia	Susanne Kiermayer	Germany

=== Double trap team ===
Year	Gold	Silver	Bronze
1991	France ( Mauricette Colavito, Giselle Renaud, ....)	Soviet Union (Yelena Rabaya, ....)	Italy
1992	CIS ( Yelena Rabaya, ....)	France	Italy
1993	Italy (Deborah Gelisio, Di Giovanni, Ratele)	Finland (One Piece, .....)	Russia
1994	Italy (Deborah Gelisio, Giovanna Pasello, Nadia Innocenti)	Finland (Riita-Mari Murtoniemi, ....)	Germany (Silke Hüsing, Petra Knetemann, Susanne Kiermayer)
1995	Finland (Riita-Mari Murtoniemi, ....)	Italy (Giovanna Pasello, ..........)	Russia
1996	Italy (Nadia Innocenti, .....)	Finland	Russia
1997	Italy (Nadia Innocenti, Giovanna Pasello, Arianna Perilli)	Finland (Pia Julin, Riitta Mari Murtoniemi, Satu Pusila)	- Russia ( Irina Laritscheva, Yelena Rabaya, Yelena Tkatsch)
1999	Finland (Pia Julin, Riitta-Mari Vainio, Satu Pusila)	Italy (Deborah Gelisio, Giovanna Pasello, Arianna Perilli)	Germany (Susanne Kiermayer, Sonja Scheibl, Judith Schüler)
2000	Italy (Nadia Innocenti, Giovanna Pasello, Arianna Perilli)	Finland (Pia Julin, Riitta-Mari Vainio, Satu Pusila)	Russia ( Irina Laritscheva, Lilja Kutschagina, Yelena Tkatsch)
2001	Italy (Nadia Innocenti, Deborah Gelisio, Maria Sole Santasilia)	Germany (Susanne Kiermayer, Sonja Scheibl, Silke Hüsing)	Finland (Pug Veromaa, Noora Antikainen, Jaana Backlund)
2002	Italy (Nadia Innocenti, Deborah Gelisio, Giovanna Pasello)	Finland (Pug Veromaa, Pia Nyback, Jaana Backlund)	Russia ( Yelena Rabaya, Lilja Kutschagina, Yelena Dudnik)
2003	Russia (Yelena Rabaya, Yelena Dudnik, Ludmilla Khochlova)	Finland (Noora Antikainen, Satu Makela-Nummela, Pug Veromaa)	Italy (Giovanna Pasello, Elena Innocenti, Monica Girotto)

=== Skeet individual ===
Year	Gold		Silver		Bronze	
Year	Athlete	Country	Athlete	Country	Athlete	Country
1954	Maeva Wallis	France	Liselotte Forgeot	France		
1957	Maeva Wallis	France				
1958	Carola Mandel	United States	Nina Geuens	Belgium	Francoise Vormus	France
1959	Lucette Derosier	France	Agnete Lexow	Norway	Spozio	Switzerland
1960	Lucette Derosier	France	Francoise Vormus	France	Nina Geuens	Belgium
1961	Mercedes Mata	Venezuela	Lucette Derosier	France	Francoise Roggwiller	France
1962	Andrée Camus	Belgium	Michele Bassoul	Lebanon	Bassoul	Lebanon
1963	Nina Geuens	Belgium	Christiane Stéphane	France	Andrée Camus	Belgium
1964	Claudia Smirnova	Soviet Union	Francine Wauters	Belgium	Nina Geuens	Belgium
1965	Claudia Smirnova	Soviet Union	Daphne Muchnic	United States	Nadine Story	Belgium
1966	Claudia Smirnova	Soviet Union	Christiane Stéphane	France	Ilkka Maattola	Finland
1967	Larisa Gurvich	Soviet Union	Laura Fantauzzi	Italy	Claudia Smirnova	Soviet Union
1968	Larisa Gurvich	Soviet Union	Claudia Smirnova	Soviet Union	Mirella Lenzini	Italy
1969	Larisa Gurvich	Soviet Union	Laura Fantauzzi	Italy	Claudia Smirnova	Soviet Union
1970	Larissa Korchinskaja	Soviet Union	Karl Linden	Norway	Michele Valery	France
1971	Larisa Gurvich Kortschinskaja	Soviet Union	Ruth Jordan	West Germany	Marguerite Delbats	France
1972	Virginia Martsinkiawitschute	Soviet Union	Karl Linden	Norway	Marie Fontaine	Belgium
1973	Ruth Jordan	West Germany	Laura Fantauzzi	Italy	Dorota Chytrowska	Poland
1974	Larissa Korchinskaja	Soviet Union	Marie Fontaine	Belgium	Pelageja Konoeeva	Soviet Union
1975	Larissa Korchinskaja	Soviet Union	Ruth Jordan	West Germany	Saskia Brixner	West Germany
1976	Polina Konejewa	Soviet Union	Dorota Chytrowska	Poland	Larissa Korchinskaja	Soviet Union
1977	Larissa Korchinskaja	Soviet Union	Dorota Chytrowska	Poland	Bianca Rosa Hansberg	Italy
1978	Larissa Korchinskaja	Soviet Union	Dorota Chytrowska	Poland	Ibolya Göbölös	Hungary
1979	Bianca Rosa Hansberg	Italy	Larisa Gurvich	Soviet Union	Ruth Jordan	West Germany
1980	Bianca Rosa Hansberg	Italy	Dorota Chytrowska	Poland	Larisa Gurvich	Soviet Union
1981	Larisa Gurvich	Soviet Union	Bianca Rosa Hansberg	Italy	Anna Jakimova	Soviet Union
1982	Ylva Jansson	Sweden	Svetlana Jakimova	Soviet Union	Van der Kimmenade	Belgium
1983	Svetlana Jakimova	Soviet Union	Kusmijenko	Soviet Union	Bianca Rosa Hansberg	Italy
1984	Svetlana Jakimova	Soviet Union	Larissa Tsuranova-Gurwitsch	Soviet Union	Bianca Rosa Hansberg	Italy
1985	Käthe Magnusson	Sweden	Bednarzuc	Poland	Bianca Rosa Hansberg	Italy
1986	Svetlana Demina	Soviet Union	Sinaida Mestachetdinova	Soviet Union	Alicja Wilczynska	Poland
1987	Svetlana Demina	Soviet Union	Yelena Puchina	Soviet Union	Sinaida Mestachetdinova	Soviet Union
1988	Svetlana Demina	Soviet Union	Sinaida Mestachetdinova	Soviet Union	Dorota Chytrowska	Poland
1989	Alicja Wilczynska	Poland	Ylva Jansson	Sweden	Dorota Chytrowska-Mika	Poland
1990	Svetlana Demina	Soviet Union	Sinaida Mestachetdinova	Soviet Union	Diana Igaly	Hungary
1991	Diana Igaly	Hungary	Dorota Chytrowska-Mika	Poland	Svetlana Demina	Soviet Union
1992	Yerjanik Avetisyan	Unified Team	Svetlana Demina	Unified Team	Yelena Pischina	Unified Team
1993	Semfira Meftachetdinova	Azerbaijan	Yerjanik Avetisyan	Armenia	Svetlana Demina	Russia
1994	Yerjanik Avetisyan	Armenia	Maarit Lepomaki	Finland	Diana Igaly	Hungary
1995						
1996	Jaana Pitkänen	Finland	Diana van der Valk	Netherlands	Ylva Jansson	
1997	Semfira Meftachetdinova	Azerbaijan	Diana van der Valk	Netherlands	Susan Bramley	United Kingdom
1998	Maarit Lepomäki	Finland	Andrea Stranovska	Slovakia	Gabriele Michel	Germany
1999	Erica Gobbo	Italy	Svetlana Demina	Russia	Olga Panarina	Russia
2000	Maarit Lepomäki	Finland	Diana Igaly	Hungary	Yerjanik Avetisyan	Russia
2001	Olga Panarina	Russia	Yerjanik Avetisyan	Russia	Sabrina Nardini	Italy
2002	Yerjanik Avetisyan	Russia	Olga Panarina	Russia	Diana van der Valk	Netherlands
2003	Semfira Meftachetdinova	Azerbaijan	Svetlana Demina	Russia	Sofia Miaouli	Cyprus

=== Skeet team ===
Year	Gold	Silver	Bronze
1973	Poland (Chytrowska, Kolodziejczyk, ...)	West Germany (Ruth Jordan, Saskia Brixner, Claudia von Kanitz)	France
1974	Soviet Union (Larissa Kortschinskaja, Polina Konejewa, Virginia Marcinciaviciute, Truskowska)	Belgium (Fontaine, ....)	France (Delbats, ...)
1975	West Germany (Ruth Jordan, Saskia Brixner, Claudia von Kanitz)	Soviet Union (Larisa Gurvich, ...)	Belgium
1976	Soviet Union (Polina Konejewa, Larissa Kortschinskaja, ....)	Poland (Chytrowska, ....)	West Germany (Ruth Jordan, Claudia von Kanitz, ...)
1977	Soviet Union (Larissa Kortschinskaja, Tuschin, ....)	West Germany (Ruth Jordan, Saskia Brixner, Claudia von Kanitz)	Poland (Chytrowska, ....)
1978	Soviet Union (Larissa Kortschinskaja, Polina Konejewa, Usman)	Poland (Chytrowska, Muranska, ....)	West Germany (Ruth Jordan, Saskia Brixner, Claudia von Kanitz)
1979	Soviet Union (Larisa Gurvich, .....)	Italy (Bianca Rosa Hansberg, ....)	West Germany (Ruth Jordan, Saskia Brixner, Claudia von Kanitz)
1980	France (Cambrion, ...)	Soviet Union (Larisa Gurvich, .....)	Sweden
1981	Soviet Union (Larisa Gurvich, Svetlana Yakimov, Kovalenko)	France (Lesprit, Delbes, Blot)	Sweden (Holmgren, Käthe Magnusson, Jansson)
1982	Soviet Union (Svetlana Yakimov, ....)	Sweden (Jansson, .....)	France
1983	United Kingdom (Andrews, Alexander, Duffield)	France (Delbes, Lesprit, Blot)	Sweden (Käthe Magnusson, Samuelsson, Jansson)
1984	Soviet Union (Svetlana Jakimova, Larissa Tsuranova-Gurwitsch, ...)	Italy (Bianca Hansberg, ....)	Sweden
1985	Poland (Bednarzuc, ....)	Sweden (Käthe Magnusson, ...)	Italy (Bianca Hansberg, ....)
1986	Soviet Union (Svetlana Demina, Meftachet, ....)	Poland (Wilczynskaya, ....)	Sweden
1987	Soviet Union (Svetlana Demina, Yelena Puchina, Sinaida Mestachetdinova)	West Germany (Michaela Rink, Claudia von Kanitz, Ulrike Brütting)	Finland
1988	Soviet Union (Svetlana Demina, Sinaida Mestachetdinova, ....)	Belgium	Sweden
1989	Poland (Alicja Wilczynska, Dorota Chytrowska-Mika, .....)	Italy	Sweden (Ylva Jansson, ....)
1990	Soviet Union (Svetlana Demina, Sinaida Mestachetdinova, Yelena Puschiana)	Hungary (Diana Igaly, ....)	Italy
1991	Hungary (Diana Igaly, I. Göbölös, E. Waswari)	Soviet Union (Svetlana Demina, .....)	Poland (Dorota Chytrowska-Mika, ....)
1992	CIS (Jerdjanik Awetisjan, Svetlana Demina, Yelena Pischina)	Hungary	Poland
1993	Hungary (I. Göbölös, Diana Igaly, E. Waswari)	Ukraine	Italy
1994	Hungary (Diana Igaly, E. Waswari, I. Gögölös)	Armenia (Jerdjanik Awetisjan, ...)	Italy
1995			
1996			
1997	Finland (Maarit Lepomäki, Jaana Pitkanen, Kirsi Sukula)	Italy (Antonella Parrini, Sabrina Nardini, Cristina Vitali)	United Kingdom (Susan Bramley, Kelly Elvin, Pinky le Grelle )
1998	Russia (Svetlana Demina, Jerdjanik Awetisjan, Anna Protasova)	Finland (Maarit Lepomäki, Jaana Pitkanen, Marjut Heinonen)	Italy (Daniela Bolis, Antonella Parrini, Cristina Vitali)
1999	Russia (Jerdjanik Awetisjan, Svetlana Demina, Olga Panarina)	Italy (Erica Gobbo, Sabrina Nardini, Cristina Vitali)	Finland (Maarit Lepomäki, Jaana Pitkanen, Kirsi Sukula)
2000	Russia (Jerdjanik Awetisjan, Svetlana Demina, Olga Panarina)	Hungary (Diana Igaly, Ibolya Gobolos, Erzsebet Vasvari)	Finland (Maarit Lepomäki, Katja Poutanen, Kirsi Sukula)
2001	Russia (Jerdjanik Awetisjan, Svetlana Demina, Olga Panarina)	Italy (Antonietta Zaino, Sabrina Nardini, Cristina Vitali)	Finland (Maarit Lepomäki, Kirsi Sukula, Marjut Heinonen)
2002	Russia (Jerdjanik Awetisjan, Svetlana Demina, Olga Panarina)	Hungary (Diana Igaly, Ibolya Gobolos, Erzsebet Vasvari)	United Kingdom (Susan Bramley, Elena Little, Pinky le Grelle )
2003	Russia (Svetlana Demina, Olga Panarina, Jerjanik Awetisjan)	United Kingdom (Elena Little, Kelly Elvin, Pinky Le Grelle)	Hungary (Erzsebet Vasvari, Diana Igaly, Ibolya Gobolos)

== See also ==
- List of medalists at the European Shooting Championships
