= 1998 European Shotgun Championships =

1998 European Shooting Championships
- Host city: Nicosia, Cyprus
- Level: Senior
- Events: 26

The 1998 European Shooting Championships was the 44th edition (included of the European Shooting Championships), of the global shotgun competition, European Shotgun Championships, organised by the International Shooting Sport Federation.

== Winners ==
Events was 22, 12 men and 10 women.

=== Men ===
Event	Winner	Country
Air traffic	Rajmond Debevec	Slovenia
Air pistols	Tanju Kirjakov	Bulgaria
Luftgewehr, team	(Roberto Di Donna, Vigilio Fait, Leonardo Messina)	Italy
Air pistol, team	(Georgi Nekschajew, Vitali Bubnowitsch, Anatoli Klimenko)	Belarus
Running disc, normal running	Dimitri Lykin	Russia
Running disc, acc. Run	Jozsef Sike	Hungary
Running disc, normal run, team	(Michael Jakosits, Manfred Kurzer, Jens Zimmermann)	Germany
Running disc, acc. Run, team	(Alexei Gorodjankin, Yuri Ermolenko, Dimitri Lykin)	Russia
Trap	Igor Tschebanow	Russia
Skeet	Boris Bechynsky	Czechoslovakia
Trap, team	(Waldemar Schanz, Karsten Bindrich, Thomas Fichtner)	Germany
Skeet, team	(Oleg Tichin, Alexej Wetoch, Nikolai Teoplij)	Russia
Double Staircase	Waldemar Schanz	Germany
Doppel-Trap, team	(Daniele Di Spigno, Luca Marini, Emanuele Bernasconi)	Italy

=== Women ===
Event	Winner	Country
Air rifle	Olga Pogrebnjak	Belarus
Air pistol	Miroslawa Sagun	Poland
Air rifle, team	(Olga Pogrebnjak, Galina Krawzowa, Natalja Schuchowa)	Belarus
Air pistol, team	(Lolita Miltschina, Ljudmila Boreischa, Julia Sinjak)	Belarus
Running disk	Silke Johannes	Germany
Running disk, team	(Marina Schapala, Ganna Tschapliewa, Julia Grigorjewa)	Ukraine
Trap	Satu Pusila	Finland
Skeet	Maarit Lepomäki	Finland
Trap, team	(Roberta Pelosi, Cristina Bocca, Giulia Iannotti)	Italy
Skeet, team	(Svetlana Demina, Jerjannik Awetissian, Anna Protasowa)	Russia
Doppel-Trap	Pia Julin	Finland
Doppel-Trap, team	(Deborah Gelisio, Isabella Petruzzelli, Giovanna Pasello)	Italy

== See also ==
- European Shooting Confederation
- International Shooting Sport Federation
- List of medalists at the European Shooting Championship
