= Susan Nattrass =

Canadian sport shooter

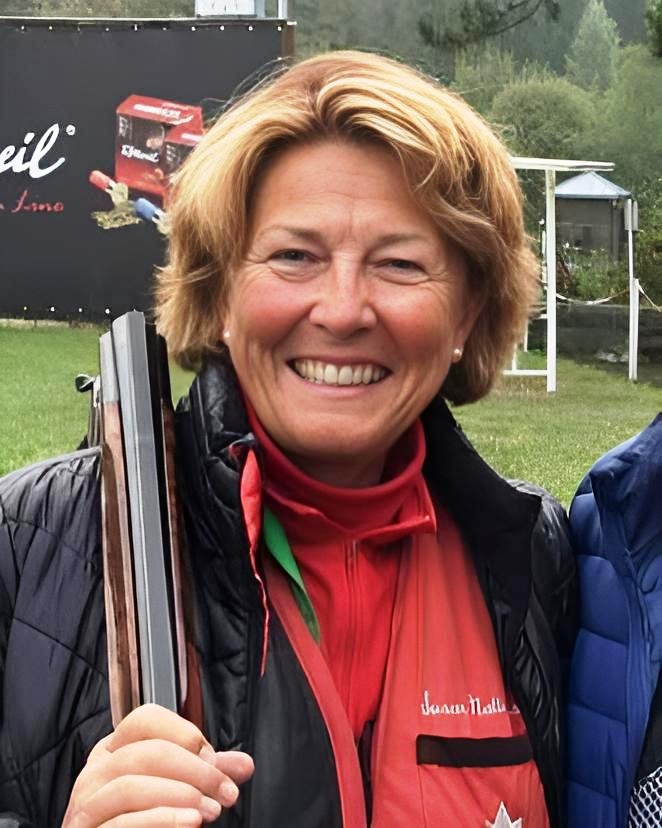
- Susan Nattrass at the 2019 World Masters Championship in Suhl

Personal information
- Full name: Susan Marie Nattrass
- Born: November 5, 1950 (age 75) Medicine Hat, Alberta, Canada

Sport
- Country: Canada
- Sport: Shooting sports
- Event: Trap shooting
Medal record
Women's trap shooting
Representing Canada
Commonwealth Games
Bronze medal – third place	2010 Delhi	Trap pairs

Susan Marie Nattrass, OC (born November 5, 1950) is a Canadian trap shooter and medical researcher in osteoporosis. She was born in Medicine Hat, Alberta. Competing at an elite international level from the 1970s through the 2010s, Nattrass has had multiple appearances, in one or both of trap or double trap, at Olympic Games, Commonwealth Games, World Championships, and Pan American Games. Nattrass is a repeat World Champion and repeat medalist at the Commonwealth Games, World Championships, and Pan American Games. She was the flag bearer for Canada at the 2007 Pan American Games (and a gold medal winner) and the 2014 Commonwealth Games.

As of the 2012 Olympics, Nattrass is one of only 122 athletes (and one of only 46 still active), all sports, to compete in at least six Olympic Games, appearing in 1976, '88, '92, 2000, '04 and '08. She won a gold medal at the World Championships in 1974, '75, '77, '78, '79, '81, and 2006.

== Beginnings ==
She was introduced to trap shooting by her father Floyd Nattrass, who competed for Canada at the World Championships in 1958 and 1968 and at the Olympics in 1964. Nattrass said of her father:

"While other kids would go to the lake for the summer, we always went to trap shoots. My dad started when I was 5; we'd go to shoots, and I did everything I could do be a part of it. Then when I turned 12, he taught me how to shoot."

== Olympics and Commonwealth Games ==
In the 1976 Summer Olympics she became the first ever woman to participate in a shooting event at the Olympics, as shooting was open to both sexes until 1992. She won a silver medal at the 2001 world championships in Cairo, Egypt in the trap event. She finished 9th in the 2000 Summer Olympics and 6th in the 2004 Summer Olympics in women's trap shooting.

At the 2006 Commonwealth Games Nattrass won three medals: two silver in women's double trap pairs and women's trap pairs and a bronze in women's trap.

She won the Trap Shooting event at the World Championships in 1981 and 2006, twenty-five years apart.

After the 1996 Summer Olympics, the International Shooting Union decided to discontinue the trap and skeet shooting events for women and instead allow women to compete in the double trap, where two clay saucers are thrown simultaneously. This is a difficult transition that Nattrass - who won two World Cups in the double trap in 1993 - equated to a downhill skier having to switch to cross-country. She led a campaign - writing letters, doing surveys, playing politics - against the decision to remove the two events. After five years, the campaign succeeded and women's skeet and trap shooting remained in the Olympics.

In 1981, she was awarded the Lou Marsh Trophy as Canadian Athlete of the Year and was made an Officer of the Order of Canada. She is also listed as a recipient of the Vanier Award for Outstanding Young Canadians.

She has travelled around the world at various competitions for over three decades, nearly always accompanied by her mother and coach Marie.

As of August 2018 Nattrass serves on the board of directors, Sections Chairs of the Shooting Federation of Canada.

== Education and research ==
Nattrass earned a bachelor's degree in Physical Education from the University of Alberta in 1972 and a Masters in 1974, and has since been an instructor, administrator, lecturer and consultant in physical education and sports psychology. In between her first and second Olympic appearances in 1976 and 1988, she earned her doctorate from the University of Alberta in 1987.

Since 1996, Nattrass has lived on Vashon Island near Seattle. She moved there when she joined the Pacific Medical Center as a medical researcher in September 1996. She owns and runs the Puget Sound Osteoporosis Center, where she studies the effects of aging in bones on active sportswomen in their forties and older, takes part in clinical trials, and provides pro-bono screenings in the community.

== Awards and achievements ==
Olympic results
Event	1976	1980	1984	1988	1992	1996	2000	2004	2008
Trap (mixed)	25th 173	—	—	30th 141	21st 142+46	—	Not held		
Trap (women)	Not held						9th 63	6th 61+15	11th 63
Double trap (women)	Not held					—	15th 93	15th 88	Not held

- Shooting Federation of Canada, Female Athlete of the Year - 1993, 2000, 2001, 2005, 2006, 2007, 2008, 2009
- Washington State Trapshooting Hall of Fame - 2017
- Seven-time Women's World Trapshooting Champion 1974 – 1981, 2006
- World record holder Women's Trapshooting 1974 – 1989; Double Trap 1993
- Six-time Olympian – 1976, 1988, 1992, 2000, 2004, 2008 Canadian Olympic teams
- Two-time gold medalist Women's Double Trap World Cups 1993
- Four-time silver medalist at World Championships 1971, 1982
- U.I.T. silver medalist at 1995 Pan American Games
- Winner of a Canadian Championship for 43 years
- Silver medalist World Cups: 2000; Bronze medalist World Cups: 2000, 2001
- Two-time silver and three-time bronze medalist at Commonwealth Games - 2002, 2006, and 2010
- Gold medalist at Pan American Games 2007
- Bronze medalist at World Championships 2005
- University of Alberta Alumni Award 2004
- Bronze medalist Pan American Games 2003
- Silver medalist at World Championships 2001
- Inducted into the Amateur Trapshooting Association's Hall of Fame 1998
- Canada's Female Athlete of the Year 1977 & 1981
- Silver medalist at World Championships 1991
- Great Canadian Award 1990
- Inducted into Edmonton's Sports Hall of Fame 2000
- U.I.T. gold medalist at 1988 Olympics
- Mayor's Silver Ribbon Award 1987
- One of Edmonton YWCA's Women of the Year 1987
- Bronze medalist at World Championships 1986
- Inducted into University of Alberta's Wall of Fame 1985
- Bronze medalist at World Championships 1985
- One of the Five Outstanding Young Canadians 1983
- Bronze medalist at World Championships 1983
- Premier's Award (Alberta Athlete of the Year) 1982
- Silver medalist at World Championships 1982
- Edmonton's Amateur Athlete of the Year 1981
- Inducted into Alberta Sports Hall of Fame 1980
- Ontario Athlete of the Year 1977
- Inducted into Canadian Sports Hall of Fame 1977
- Inducted into Canadian Olympic Association Hall of Fame 1975
- Canadian Athlete Reference - The Canadian Encyclopedia

== Results in World Championships ==
Year	Place	Gold	Silver	Bronze
1971	(Italy) Bologna	Galina Khomutova (URS)	Susan Nattrass (CAN)	Nuria Ortiz (MEX)
1974	(Switzerland) Bern	Susan Nattrass (CAN)	Audrey Grosch (USA)	Francoise Robrolle (FRA)
1975	(West Germany) Munich	Susan Nattrass (CAN)	Elisabeth von Soden (FRG)	Natalia Ukolova (URS)
1977	(France) Antibes	Susan Nattrass (CAN)	Audrey Grosch (USA)	Wanda Gentiletti (ITA)
1978	(South Korea) Seoul	Susan Nattrass (CAN)	Wanda Gentiletti (ITA)	Maria Carmen Garcia de Cubas (ESP)
1979	(Italy) Montecatini Terme	Susan Nattrass (CAN)	Julia Klekova (URS)	Larisa Tushkina (URS)
1981	(Argentina) Tucuman	Susan Nattrass (CAN)	Mauricette Colavito (FRA)	Frances Strodtman (USA)
1982	(Venezuela) Caracas	Maria Carmen Garcia de Cubas (ESP)	Susan Nattrass (CAN)	Elena Shishirina (URS)
1983	(Canada) Edmonton	Connie Tomsovic (USA)	Elena Shishirina (URS)	Susan Nattrass (CAN)
1986	(East Germany) Suhl	Gao E (CHN)	Elena Shishirina (URS)	Susan Nattrass (CAN)
1991	(Australia) Perth	Gema Usieto (ESP)	Susan Nattrass (CAN)	Roberta Pelosi (ITA)
2001	(Egypt) Cairo	Irina Laricheva (RUS)	Susan Nattrass (CAN)	Gao E (CHN)
2005	(Italy) Lonato	Deborah Gelisio (ITA)	Irina Laricheva (RUS)	Susan Nattrass (CAN)
2006	(Croatia) Zagreb	Susan Nattrass (CAN)	Li Chen (CHN)	Hye Gyong Chae (PRK)

== See also ==
- List of athletes with the most appearances at Olympic Games

Awards
Preceded by Terry Fox	Lou Marsh Trophy winner 1981	Succeeded by Wayne Gretzky
