= 2004 European Shotgun Championships =

2004 European Shooting Championships
- Dates: 27 June
- Host city: Nicosia, Cyprus
- Level: Senior
- Events: 12

The 2004 European Shooting Championships was the 50th edition (included the of the European Shooting Championships), of the global shotgun competition, European Shotgun Championships, organised by the International Shooting Sport Federation.

== Winners ==
Events was 12, 6 men and 6 women.

=== Men ===
Event	1st place, gold medalist(s)	2nd place, silver medalist(s)	3rd place, bronze medalist(s)
Trap	(Turkey) Alp Kizilsu	(Hungary) Istvan Putz	(France) Stephane Clamens
Trap team	United Kingdom	France	Germany
Double trap	(Sweden) Håkan Dahlby	(United Kingdom) Richard Faulds	(Italy) Daniele Di Spigno
Double trap team	Sweden	Italy	Russia
Skeet	(Italy) Ennio Falco	(Czech Republic) Jan Sychra	(Spain) Juan Jose Aramburu
Skeet team	Norway	Italy	Germany

=== Women ===
Event	1st place, gold medalist(s)	2nd place, silver medalist(s)	3rd place, bronze medalist(s)
Trap	(France) Vanessa Leon	(United Kingdom) Sarah Gibbins	(Sweden) Pia Hansen
Trap team	Spain	Germany	Russia
Double trap	(Sweden) Pia Hansen	(Italy) Elena Innocenti	(Germany) Susanne Kiermayer
Double trap team	Italy	United Kingdom	Finland
Skeet	(Russia) Svetlana Demina	(France) Veronique Girardet Allard	(Russia) Yerjanik Avetisian
Skeet team	Russia	Italy	France

== See also ==
- European Shooting Confederation
- International Shooting Sport Federation
- List of medalists at the European Shooting Championship
