= Shooting at the 2008 Summer Olympics – Women's trap =

Women's trap at the Games of the XXIX Olympiad
- Venue: Beijing Shooting Range Clay Target Field
- Date: August 11, 2008
- Competitors: 20 from 20 nations
- Winning score: 91 (OR)

Medalists
1st place, gold medalist(s)		Satu Mäkelä-Nummela	Finland
2nd place, silver medalist(s)		Zuzana Štefečeková	Slovakia
3rd place, bronze medalist(s)		Corey Cogdell	United States

The Women's trap event at the 2008 Olympic Games took place on August 11, 2008 at the Beijing Shooting Range Clay Target Field.

The event consisted of two rounds: a qualifier and a final. In the qualifier, each shooter fired 3 sets of 25 targets in trap shooting, with 10 targets being thrown to the left, 10 to the right, and 5 straight-away in each set. The shooters could take two shots at each target.

The top 6 shooters in the qualifying round moved on to the final round. There, they fired one additional round of 25 targets, where only one shot could be taken at each target. The total score from all 100 targets was used to determine final ranking. Ties are broken using a shoot-off; additional shots are fired one at a time until there is no longer a tie.

== Records ==
Prior to this competition, the existing world and Olympic records were as follows.

Qualification records
World record	Victoria Chuyko (UKR); Chen Li (CHN); Zuzana Štefečeková (SVK); Giulia Iannotti (ITA)	74	Nicosia, Cyprus; Qingyuan, China; Qingyuan, China; Maribor, Slovenia	13 June 1998; 4 April 2006; 4 April 2006; 28 June 2007
Olympic record	Daina Gudzinevičiūtė (LTU)	71	Sydney, Australia	18 September 2000

Final records
World record	Zuzana Štefečeková (SVK)	96 (74+22)	Qingyuan, China	4 April 2006
Olympic record	ISSF Rule changed on 01.01.2005	–	–	–

During the competition, Satu Mäkelä-Nummela established a new final Olympic record after the final rules had been changed to only allow one shot per target.

== Qualification round ==
The qualification round was held between 09:00 and 13:30 China Standard Time (UTC+8).

Rank	Athlete	Country	1	2	3	Total	Notes
1	Zuzana Štefečeková	Slovakia	24	21	25	70	Q
2	Satu Mäkelä-Nummela	Finland	24	23	23	70	Q
3	Elena Struchaeva	Kazakhstan	21	24	24	69	Q
4	Corey Cogdell	United States	23	23	23	69	Q
5	Daina Gudzinevičiūtė	Lithuania	23	24	22	69	Q
6	Yukie Nakayama	Japan	22	23	22	67	Q
7	Deborah Gelisio	Italy	20	23	23	66	
8	Susanne Kiermayer	Germany	22	21	22	65	
9	Irina Laricheva	Russia	20	22	22	64	
10	Nadine Stanton	New Zealand	19	22	22	63	
11	Susan Nattrass	Canada	22	23	18	63	
12	Liu Yingzi	China	23	22	18	63	
13	Delphine Racinet	France	18	20	24	62	
14	Stacy Roiall	Australia	22	17	23	62	
15	Daniela Del Din	San Marino	20	21	21	62	
16	Charlotte Kerwood	Great Britain	18	23	17	58	
17	Diane Swanton	South Africa	18	21	18	57	
18	Pak Yong-hui	North Korea	15	19	22	56	
19	Lee Bo-na	South Korea	21	15	19	55	
20	Gaby Ahrens	Namibia	18	14	20	52	

Q Qualified for final

== Final ==
The final was held at 15:00 China Standard Time (UTC+8).

Rank	Athlete	Qual	Final	Total	Bronze shoot-off	4th place shoot-off	5th place shoot-off	Notes
1st place, gold medalist(s)	Satu Mäkelä-Nummela (FIN)	70	21	91				OR
2nd place, silver medalist(s)	Zuzana Štefečeková (SVK)	70	19	89				
3rd place, bronze medalist(s)	Corey Cogdell (USA)	69	17	86	1			
4	Yukie Nakayama (JPN)	67	19	86	0	1		
5	Daina Gudzinevičiūtė (LTU)	69	17	86	0	0	2	
6	Elena Struchaeva (KAZ)	69	17	86	0	0	1	

OR Olympic record
