= 2007 ISSF World Cup =

The 2007 ISSF World Cup was held in the fifteen Olympic shooting events. Four qualification events were held in each event, spanning from March to July, and the best shooters qualified for the ISSF World Cup Final in October, which was held in Bangkok, Thailand for the rifle and pistol events, and in Belgrade, Serbia for the shotgun events.

Notable about this season is that Europe only had one world cup in the rifle and pistol events (Munich), as Milan was left out in favour of a more worldwide spread of venues.

== Winners ==
	WC 1	WC 2	WC 3	WC 4	Final
	Fort Benning, United States	Sydney, Australia	Bangkok, Thailand	Munich, Germany	Bangkok, Thailand
	31 Mar – 08 Apr	25 Apr – 3 May	3 May – 11 May	28 May – 04 Jun	03 Oct – 08 Oct
Men's 50 m Rifle 3 Positions	Artem Khadjibekov; Russia	Michael Anti; United States	Péter Sidi; Hungary	Rajmond Debevec; Slovenia	Matthew Emmons; United States
Men's 50 m Rifle Prone	Matthew Emmons; United States	Warren Potent; Australia	Warren Potent; Australia	Gil Simkovitch; Israel	Sergei Martynov; Belarus
Men's 10 m Air Rifle	Zhu Qinan; China	Lin Yun; China	Péter Sidi; Hungary	Jozef Gönci; Slovakia	Zhu Qinan; China
Men's 50 m Pistol	Lin Zhongzai; China	Boris Kokorev; Russia	Oleg Omelchuk; Ukraine	João Costa; Portugal	Lin Zhongzai; China
Men's 25 m Rapid Fire Pistol	Ralf Schumann; Germany	Zhang Penghui; China	Sergei Alifirenko; Russia	Zhang Penghui; China	Ralf Schumann; Germany
Men's 10 m Air Pistol	Vladimir Isakov; Russia	Vladimir Gontcharov; Russia	Walter Lapeyre; France	Mikhail Nestruev; Russia	Vladimir Isakov; Russia
Women's 50 m Rifle 3 Positions	Sonja Pfeilschifter; Germany	Olga Dovgun; Kazakhstan	Lidija Mihajlović; Serbia	Sonja Pfeilschifter; Germany	Yin Wen; China
Women's 10 m Air Rifle	Zhang Yi; China	Du Li; China	Zhao Yinghui; China	Sonja Pfeilschifter; Germany	Du Li; China
Women's 25 m Pistol	Chen Ying; China	Chen Ying; China	Tsogbadrakhyn Mönkhzul; Mongolia	Guo Wenjun; China	Chen Ying; China
Women's 10 m Air Pistol	Lenka Maruskova; Czech Republic	Hu Jun; China	Olga Kuznetsova; Russia	Viktoria Chaika; Belarus	Natalia Paderina; Russia
	WC 1	WC 2	WC 3	WC 4	Final
	Santo Domingo, Dominican Republic	Changwon, South Korea	Lonato, Italy	Maribor, Slovenia	Belgrade, Serbia
	18 Mar – 29 Mar	13 Apr – 24 Apr	06 Jun – 15 Jun	26 Jun – 07 Jul	15 Oct – 21 Oct
Men's Trap	Lance Bade; United States	Erik Varga; Slovakia	Massimiliano Mola; Italy	Jesus Serrano; Spain	Erminio Frasca; Italy
Men's Double Trap	Håkan Dahlby; Sweden	Walton Eller; United States	Joshua Richmond; United States	Francesco Daniello; Italy	Walton Eller; United States
Men's Skeet	Georgios Achilleos; Cyprus	Valeriy Shomin; Russia	Vincent Hancock; United States	Axel Wegner; Germany	Georgios Achilleos; Cyprus
Women's Trap	Deborah Gelisio; Italy	Yukie Nakayama; Japan	Zuzana Štefečeková; Slovakia	Deborah Gelisio; Italy	Giulia Iannotti; Italy
Women's Skeet	Kim Rhode; United States	Wei Ning; China	Erdzhanik Avetisyan; Russia	Christine Brinker; Germany	Erdzhanik Avetisyan; Russia

=== Triple winners ===
- Sonja Pfeilschifter (GER) (STR3X20 and AR40)
- Chen Ying (CHN) (SP)

=== Double winners ===
- Warren Potent (AUS) (FR60PR)
- Péter Sidi (HUN) (FR3X40 and AR60)
- Zhang Penghui (CHN) (RFP)
- Deborah Gelisio (ITA) (TR75)
- Lin Zhongzai (CHN) (FP)
- Matthew Emmons (USA) (FR3X40 and FR60PR)
- Ralf Schumann (GER) (RFP)
- Du Li (CHN) (AR40)
- Vladimir Isakov (RUS) (AP60)
- Zhu Qinan (CHN) (AR60)
- Erdzhanik Avetisyan (RUS) (SK75)
- Walton Eller (USA) (DT150)
- Georgios Achilleos (CYP) (SK125)

== See also ==
- 2007 World Shotgun Championships
- Shooting at the 2008 Summer Olympics – Qualification
