= Shooting at the 2000 Summer Olympics – Women's double trap =

Sports shooting at the Olympics

Women's double trap at the Games of the XXVII Olympiad
- Venue: Sydney International Shooting Centre
- Date: 19 September 2000
- Competitors: 17 from 12 nations
- Winning score: 148 (OR)

Medalists
1st place, gold medalist(s)		Pia Hansen	Sweden
2nd place, silver medalist(s)		Deborah Gelisio	Italy
3rd place, bronze medalist(s)		Kim Rhode	United States

The women's double trap competition at the 2000 Summer Olympics was the second of three instances, and the only one not won by Kim Rhode, who came third. Pia Hansen raised Rhode's Olympic record by seven hits, and was only one hit from Deborah Gelisio's World records in both the qualification and final rounds. Gelisio won the silver medal, distanced by a four-hit margin.

== Records ==
Prior to this competition, the existing World and Olympic records were as follows.

Qualification records
World record	Deborah Gelisio (ITA)	113	Nicosia, Cyprus	19 June 1995
Olympic record	Kim Rhode (USA)	108	Atlanta, United States	23 July 1996

Final records
World record	Deborah Gelisio (ITA)	149 (113+36)	Nicosia, Cyprus	13 June 1998
Olympic record	Kim Rhode (USA)	141	Atlanta, United States	23 July 1996

== Qualification round ==
The qualification round consisted of 20 doubles each in the A, B and C programmes.

Rank	Athlete	Country	A	B	C	Total	Notes
1	Pia Hansen	Sweden	37	38	37	112	Q OR
2	Deborah Gelisio	Italy	37	38	32	107	Q
3	Kim Rhode	United States	34	35	34	103	Q
4	Cynthia Meyer	Canada	34	32	35	101	Q
5	Cindy Gentry	United States	34	32	34	100	Q
6	Lin Yi-chun	Chinese Taipei	35	35	30	100	Q
7	Anne Focan	Belgium	32	33	34	99	
8	Zhang Yafei	China	34	30	34	98	
9	Gao E	China	37	28	33	98	
9	Susanne Kiermayer	Germany	35	31	32	98	
9	Ann Maree Roberts	Australia	34	32	32	98	
12	Deserie Baynes	Australia	36	31	30	97	
13	Pia Julin	Finland	30	32	32	94	
13	Yukie Nakayama	Japan	31	30	33	94	
15	Susan Nattrass	Canada	32	33	28	93	
16	Yelena Tkach	Russia	31	29	30	90	
17	Satu Pusila	Finland	26	28	31	85	

OR Olympic record – Q Qualified for final

== Final ==
The final repeated the C programme for the top six shooters.

Rank	Athlete	Qual	Final	Total	Shoot-off	Notes
1st place, gold medalist(s)	Pia Hansen (SWE)	112	36	148		OR
2nd place, silver medalist(s)	Deborah Gelisio (ITA)	107	37	144		
3rd place, bronze medalist(s)	Kim Rhode (USA)	103	36	139		
4	Lin Yi-chun (TPE)	100	34	134	14	
5	Cynthia Meyer (CAN)	101	33	134	13	
6	Cindy Gentry (USA)	100	30	130		

OR Olympic record

== Sources ==
- Official Report of the XXVII Olympiad — Shooting (PDF).
