= Yelena Dudnik =

Russian sport shooter

Personal information
- Full name: Yelena Vladimirovna Dudnik
- Nationality: Russia
- Born: 22 October 1978 (age 47) Rostov-on-Don, Russian SFSR, Soviet Union
- Height: 1.65 m (5 ft 5 in)
- Weight: 54 kg (119 lb)

Sport
- Sport: Shooting
- Event(s): Trap (TR75); Double trap (DT120)
- Club: Dynamo Rostov
- Coached by: Irina Kravtchuk

Yelena Vladimirovna Dudnik (Russian: Елена Владимировна Дудник; born 22 October 1978 in Rostov-on-Don) is a Russian sport shooter. She attained top four finishes in double trap shooting at the European Championships, and had a golden opportunity to represent Russia at the 2004 Summer Olympics in Athens, finishing ninth in the process. Dudnik trains full-time as a member of the shooting team for Dynamo Rostov under personal coach Irina Kravtchuk.

Dudnik made her first and only Russian squad in the women's double trap, one of the events later removed from the Olympic program, at the 2004 Summer Olympics in Athens. She achieved a minimum qualifying score of 101 to fill out one of the Olympic places for Russia won by Elena Rabaia from the European Championships in Brno, Czech Republic. Dudnik improved her career feat by shooting 105 hits out of 120 to force a ninth-place tie with defending Olympic champion Pia Hansen of Sweden in the qualifying round, missing out the final by two targets.
