= Shooting at the 2012 Summer Olympics – Women's trap =

Women's trap at the Games of the XXX Olympiad
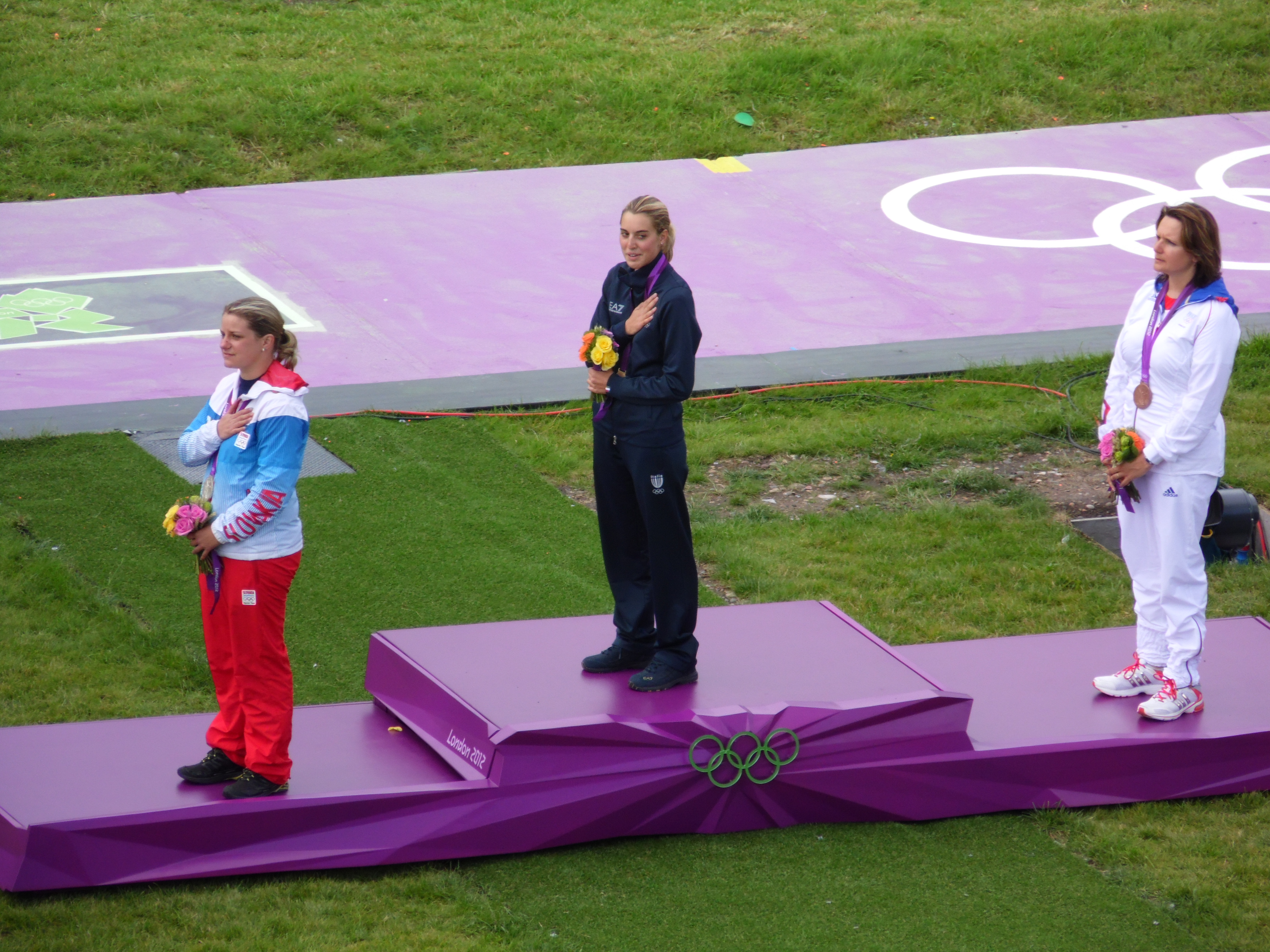
- Venue: Royal Artillery Barracks
- Date: 4 August 2012
- Competitors: 22 from 21 nations
- Winning score: 99

Medalists
1st place, gold medalist(s)		Jessica Rossi	Italy
2nd place, silver medalist(s)		Zuzana Štefečeková	Slovakia
3rd place, bronze medalist(s)		Delphine Reau	France

The Women's trap event at the 2012 Olympic Games took place on 4 August 2012 at the Royal Artillery Barracks.

The event consisted of two rounds: a qualifier and a final. In the qualifier, each shooter fired 3 sets of 25 targets in trap shooting, with 10 targets being thrown to the left, 10 to the right, and 5 straight-away in each set. The shooters could take two shots at each target.

The top 6 shooters in the qualifying round moved on to the final round. There, they fired one additional round of 25 targets, where only one shot could be taken at each target. The total score from all 100 targets was used to determine final ranking. Ties are broken using a shoot-off; additional shots are fired one at a time until there is no longer a tie.

== Records ==
Prior to this competition, the existing world and Olympic records were as follows.

Qualification records
World record	Viktoria Chuyko (UKR)	74	Nicosia, Cyprus	13 June 1998
Olympic record	Daina Gudzinevičiūtė (LTU)	71	Sydney, Australia	18 September 2000

Final records
World record	Zuzana Štefečeková (SVK)	96 (74+22)	Qingyuan, China	4 April 2006
Olympic record	Satu Mäkelä-Nummela (FIN)	91 (70+21)	Beijing, China	11 August 2008

== Qualification round ==
Rank	Athlete	Country	1	2	3	Total	Notes
1	Jessica Rossi	Italy	25	25	25	75	WR, Q
2	Zuzana Štefečeková	Slovakia	24	25	24	73	Q
3	Suzanne Balogh	Australia	24	23	25	72	Q
4	Delphine Réau	France	25	25	22	72	Q
5	Alessandra Perilli	San Marino	25	24	22	71	Q
6	Fátima Gálvez	Spain	23	25	22	70	Shoot Off: 12, Q
7	Satu Mäkelä-Nummela	Finland	22	24	24	70	Shoot Off: 11
8	Elena Tkach	Russia	23	22	25	70	Shoot Off: 6
9	Kimberly Rhode	United States	23	21	24	68	
10	Lin Yi-chun	Chinese Taipei	22	23	22	68	
11	Corey Cogdell	United States	25	22	21	68	
12	Liu Yingzi	China	23	22	22	67	
13	Nihan Kantarcı	Turkey	24	21	21	66	
14	Daina Gudzinevičiūtė	Lithuania	24	22	20	66	
15	Yukie Nakayama	Japan	20	23	22	65	
16	Charlotte Kerwood	Great Britain	22	19	23	64	
17	Sonja Scheibl	Germany	20	22	22	64	
18	Ray Bassil	Lebanon	22	22	20	64	
19	Kang Gee-Eun	South Korea	19	22	21	62	
20	Shagun Chowdhary	India	23	17	21	61	
21	Yasmina Mesfioui	Morocco	17	24	20	61	
22	Gaby Ahrens	Namibia	20	21	18	59	

== Final ==
Rank	Athlete	Qual	Final	Total	Notes
1st place, gold medalist(s)	Jessica Rossi (ITA)	75	24	99	WR, OR
2nd place, silver medalist(s)	Zuzana Štefečeková (SVK)	73	20	93	Shoot Off: 3
3rd place, bronze medalist(s)	Delphine Réau (FRA)	72	21	93	Shoot Off: 2
4	Alessandra Perilli (SMR)	71	22	93	Shoot Off: 1
5	Fátima Gálvez (ESP)	70	17	87	
6	Suzanne Balogh (AUS)	72	15	87	
