= Kauppila =

Kauppila is a Finnish surname. Notable people with the surname include:

- Jani Kauppila (born 1980), Finnish footballer
- Jari Kauppila (born 1974), Finnish ice hockey player
- Raimo Kauppila, Finnish sports shooter
