= Stacy Roiall =

Australian sport shooter

Personal information
- Nationality: Australia
- Born: 14 May 1977 (age 49) Auckland, New Zealand
- Height: 1.60 m (5 ft 3 in)
- Weight: 80 kg (176 lb)

Sport
- Sport: Shooting
- Event: Trap
- Club: Werribee Victoria Clay Target; Club
- Coached by: Greg Chan
Medal record
Women's shooting
Representing Australia
Commonwealth Games
Gold medal – first place	2010 Delhi	Trap (pairs)

Stacy Roiall (born 14 May 1977 in Auckland, New Zealand) is a New Zealand-born Australian sport shooter. She won two medals (gold and bronze) in the women's trap at the 2004 ISSF World Cup in Sydney, Australia, and at the 2005 ISSF World Cup in Rome, Italy, with scores of 94 and 86 targets, respectively. She also captured a gold medal in the same discipline, along with her partner Laetischa Scanlan, at the 2010 Commonwealth Games in Delhi, India, setting a new games record of 93 clay pigeons.

Roiall represented her adopted nation Australia at the 2008 Summer Olympics in Beijing, where she competed in women's trap shooting. She finished only in fourteenth place by one point behind France's Delphine Racinet from the final attempt, for a total score of 62 targets.
