= Yelena Struchayeva =

Kazakhstani sport shooter

Personal information
- Nationality: Kazakhstan
- Born: 5 January 1965 (age 61) Alma-Ata, Kazakh SSR, Soviet Union
- Height: 1.56 m (5 ft 1 1/2 in)
- Weight: 86 kg (190 lb)

Sport
- Sport: Shooting
- Event: Trap
Medal record
Women's shooting
Representing Kazakhstan
Asian Championships
Gold medal – first place	2007 Kuwait City	Trap
Bronze medal – third place	2007 Kuwait City	Trap team

Yelena Struchayeva (Kazakh: Елена Васильевна Стручаева; born January 5, 1965, in Alma-Ata) is a Kazakhstani sport shooter. Struchaeva qualified for the women's trap as a 43-year-old at the 2008 Summer Olympics in Beijing, by winning the gold medal from the 2007 Asian Shooting Championships in Kuwait City, Kuwait. She scored a total of 69 points after firing three sets of 25 targets and receiving six misses in the qualifying round of the competition. She added seventeen more shots to obtain a total of 86 points in the final, but missed out of the bronze medal triumph to United States' Corey Cogdell in a four-person shoot-off. In the end, Struchaeva finished the event in sixth place, after losing out in a fifth-place match against Lithuania's Daina Gudzinevičiūtė.
