= Shooting at the 2000 Summer Olympics – Women's trap =

Sports shooting at the Olympics

Women's trap at the Games of the XXVII Olympiad
- Venue: Sydney International Shooting Centre
- Date: 18 September 2000
- Competitors: 17 from 15 nations
- Winning score: 93 (OR)

Medalists
1st place, gold medalist(s)		Daina Gudzinevičiūtė	Lithuania
2nd place, silver medalist(s)		Delphine Racinet	France
3rd place, bronze medalist(s)		Gao E	China

At the 2000 Summer Olympics, women's trap shooting was included for the first time. The competition was held on 18 September, with Daina Gudzinevičiūtė becoming the inaugural champion.

== Records ==
Prior to this competition, the existing World and Olympic records were as follows.

Qualification records
World record	Viktoria Chuyko (UKR)	74	Nicosia, Cyprus	13 June 1998
Olympic record	New event	—		

Final records
World record	Satu Pusila (FIN)	95	Nicosia, Cyprus	13 June 1998
Olympic record	New event	—		

== Qualification round ==
Rank	Athlete	Country	Score	Notes
1	Daina Gudzinevičiūtė	Lithuania	71	Q OR
2	Gao E	China	68	Q
3	Anne Focan	Belgium	67	Q
4	Delphine Racinet	France	67	Q
5	Susanne Kiermayer	Germany	66	Q
6	Yelena Tkach	Russia	65	Q
7	Emanuela Felici	San Marino	64	
8	Pia Hansen	Sweden	64	
9	Susan Nattrass	Canada	63	
10	Cynthia Meyer	Canada	62	
10	Lisa-Anne Smith	Australia	62	
12	Deserie Baynes	Australia	61	
13	Satu Pusila	Finland	60	
14	Cindy Gentry	United States	59	
15	Teresa Borrell	New Zealand	58	
16	Taeko Takeba	Japan	56	
17	Giulia Iannotti	Italy	52	

OR Olympic record – Q Qualified for final

== Final ==
Rank	Athlete	Qual	Final	Total	Notes
1st place, gold medalist(s)	Daina Gudzinevičiūtė (LTU)	71	22	93	OR
2nd place, silver medalist(s)	Delphine Racinet (FRA)	67	25	92	
3rd place, bronze medalist(s)	Gao E (CHN)	68	22	90	
4	Anne Focan (BEL)	67	21	88	
5	Susanne Kiermayer (GER)	66	20	86	
6	Yelena Tkach (RUS)	65	16	81	

OR Olympic record

== Sources ==
- Official Report of the XXVII Olympiad — Shooting (PDF).
