= Shooting at the 2004 Summer Olympics – Women's double trap =

Women's double trap at the Games of the XXVIII Olympiad
- Venue: Markópoulo Olympic Shooting; Centre
- Date: August 18, 2004
- Competitors: 15 from 12 nations
- Winning score: 146

Medalists
1st place, gold medalist(s)		Kim Rhode	United States
2nd place, silver medalist(s)		Lee Bo-na	South Korea
3rd place, bronze medalist(s)		Gao E	China

The women's double trap competition at the 2004 Summer Olympics was held on August 18 at the Markópoulo Olympic Shooting Centre near Athens, Greece. This was the last Olympic competition in the event, before being removed from the program shortly after the Games.

The event consisted of two rounds: a qualifier and a final. In the qualifier, each shooter fired 3 sets of 40 in the set order of skeet shooting.

The top 6 shooters in the qualifying round moved on to the final round. There, they fired one additional round of 40. The total score from all 160 shots was used to determine final ranking. Ties are broken using a shoot-off; additional shots are fired one at a time until there is no longer a tie.

U.S. shooter and 1996 Olympic champion Kim Rhode rallied her way in the final rounds to reclaim the gold medal with a total record of 146. South Korea's Lee Bo-na narrowly missed a shot for the Olympic title by a single bird, but secured the silver with a score of 145, while Chinese shooter and four-time Olympian Gao E beat her teammate Li Qingnian in a 2 to 1 shoot-off to take the bronze at 142 hits.

== Records ==
Prior to this competition, the existing world and Olympic records were as follows.

Qualification records
World record	Zhang Yafei (CHN)	115	Nicosia, Cyprus	20 October 2000
Olympic record	Pia Hansen (SWE)	112	Sydney, Australia	19 September 2000

Final records
World record	Zhang Yafei (CHN)	150 (115+35)	Nicosia, Cyprus	20 October 2000
Olympic record	Pia Hansen (SWE)	148 (112+36)	Sydney, Australia	19 September 2000

== Qualification round ==
Rank	Athlete	Country	A	B	C	Total	Notes
1	Kim Rhode	United States	36	36	38	110	Q
2	Lee Bo-na	South Korea	36	37	37	110	Q
3	Megumi Inoue	Japan	37	33	39	109	Q
4	Nadine Stanton	New Zealand	33	37	38	108	Q
5	Gao E	China	36	36	35	107	Q
6	Li Qingnian	China	37	35	35	107	Q
7	Susan Trindall	Australia	35	33	38	106	
7	Lin Yi-chun	Chinese Taipei	36	33	37	106	
9	Yelena Dudnik	Russia	33	36	36	105	
9	Pia Hansen	Sweden	39	32	34	105	
11	Susanne Kiermayer	Germany	34	36	31	101	
11	Cynthia Meyer	Canada	35	32	34	101	
13	Suzanne Balogh	Australia	34	33	30	97	
13	María Quintanal	Spain	32	33	32	97	
15	Susan Nattrass	Canada	30	33	25	88	

Q Qualified for final

== Final ==
Rank	Athlete	Qual	Final	Total	Shoot-off
1st place, gold medalist(s)	Kim Rhode (USA)	110	36	146	
2nd place, silver medalist(s)	Lee Bo-na (KOR)	110	35	145	
3rd place, bronze medalist(s)	Gao E (CHN)	107	35	142	2
4	Li Qingnian (CHN)	107	35	142	1
5	Megumi Inoue (JPN)	109	31	140	
6	Nadine Stanton (NZL)	108	29	137	
