= Bianca Rosa Hansberg =

Italian sport shooter

Personal information
- National team: Italy
- Born: 7 February 1941 (age 85)

Sport
- Sport: Shooting
- Event(s): Skeet; Trap
Medal record
Individual
Event	1st	2nd	3rd
World Championships	2	0	2
European Championships	2	1	4
Total	4	1	6
Team
Event	1st	2nd	3rd
World Championships	1	0	1
European Championships	0	2	1
Total	1	2	2

Bianca Rosa Hansberg (born 7 February 1941) is a former Italian female sport shooter who won medals at individual senior level at the World Championships and European Championships.

== Biography ==
Bianca Rosa Hansberg was among the pioneers of sport shooting in Italy. She competed in the sporting skeet discipline in which she went on to win two world titles and two individual European titles. However in 1978 at the world championships in Seoul she managed to win a gold medal with the team in the trap.

== Honours ==
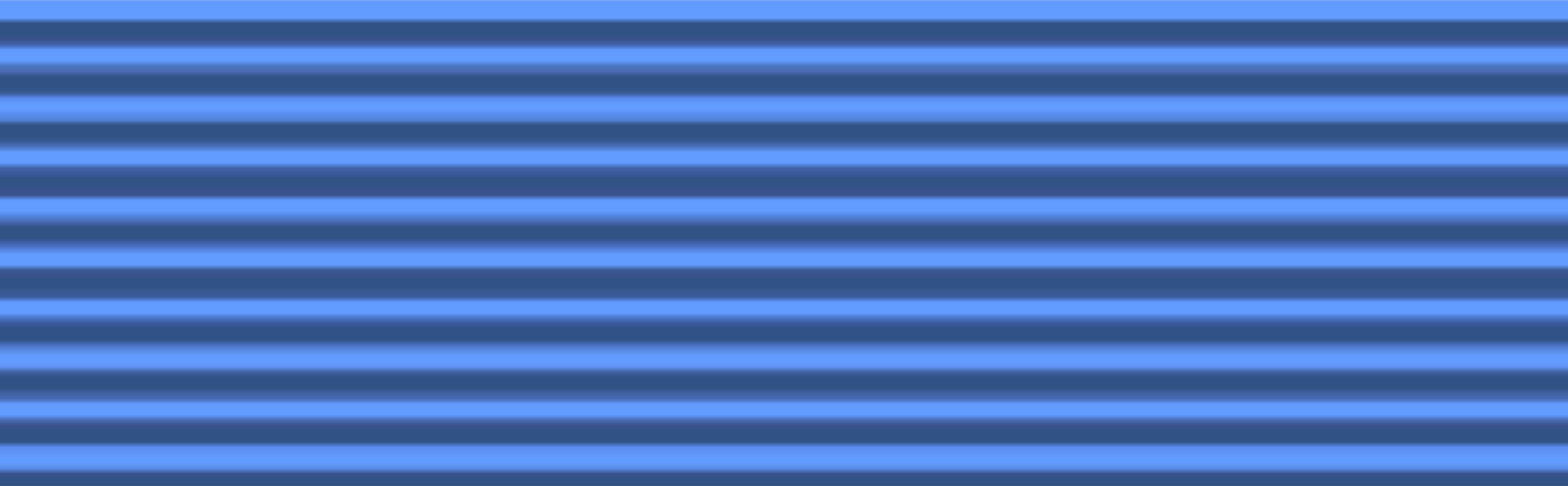

CONI: Golden Collar of Sports Merit: Collare d'Oro al Merito Sportivo (2019).

== See also ==
- Trap World Champions
- Skeet World Champions
- Trap and skeet European Champions
