= Igor Chebanov =

Russian sport shooter

Personal information
- Nationality: Russian
- Born: 30 July 1959 (age 66) Rostov-on-Don, Russia
- Height: 1.82 m (6 ft 0 in)
- Weight: 90 kg (198 lb)

Sport
- Sport: Shooting
- Event: Trap
- Club: Army Sports club
- Start activity: 1982
- Coached by: Valentin Buchanko
Medal record
Individual
Event	1st	2nd	3rd
European Championships	2	0	0
Team
Event	1st	2nd	3rd
World Championships	1	1	0
European Championships	0	2	0
Total	1	3	0

Igor Chebanov (born 30 July 1959) is a former Russian sport shooter who won medals at senior level at the World Championships and European Championships.

== See also ==
- Trap World Champions
- Trap European Champions
