= Cindy Shenberger =

American sport shooter

Personal information
- Born: June 12, 1969 (age 56) Vallejo, California, United States

Sport
- Sport: Sport shooting

Cindy Shenberger (born June 12, 1969) is an American sport shooter. She competed at the 2000 Summer Olympics in the women's skeet event, in which she placed fifth.
