= Shooting at the 2000 Summer Olympics – Women's skeet =

Sports shooting at the Olympics

Women's skeet at the Games of the XXVII Olympiad
- Venue: Sydney International Shooting Centre
- Date: 21 September 2000
- Competitors: 13 from 11 nations
- Winning score: 98 (OR)

Medalists
1st place, gold medalist(s)		Zemfira Meftahatdinova	Azerbaijan
2nd place, silver medalist(s)		Svetlana Demina	Russia
3rd place, bronze medalist(s)		Diána Igaly	Hungary

At the 2000 Summer Olympics, women's skeet shooting was included for the first time. The competition was held on 21 September, with Zemfira Meftahatdinova becoming the inaugural champion. The only woman to previously win a skeet competition at the Olympics, Zhang Shan (who won the 1992 competition open to both men and women) participated but did not reach the final.

== Records ==
Prior to this competition, the existing World and Olympic records were as follows.

Qualification records
World record	Svetlana Demina (RUS)	75	Kumamoto, Japan	1 June 1999
Olympic record	New event	—		

Final records
World record	Svetlana Demina (RUS)	99 (75+24)	Kumamoto, Japan	1 June 1999
Olympic record	New event	—		

== Qualification round ==
Rank	Athlete	Country	Score	Notes
1	Zemfira Meftahatdinova	Azerbaijan	73	Q OR
2	Diána Igaly	Hungary	71	Q
3	Cindy Shenberger	United States	70	Q
4	Erdzhanik Avetisyan	Russia	70	Q
4	Tash Lonsdale	Australia	70	Q
6	Svetlana Demina	Russia	70	Q
7	Kim Rhode	United States	69	
8	Zhang Shan	China	69	
9	Kim Myong-hwa	North Korea	69	
9	Sophia Miaouli	Cyprus	69	
11	Maarit Lepomäki	Finland	68	
11	Cristina Vitali	Italy	68	
13	Andrea Stranovská	Slovakia	67	

OR Olympic record – Q Qualified for final

== Final ==
Rank	Athlete	Qual	Final	Total	5th place shoot-off	Bronze shoot-off	Notes
1st place, gold medalist(s)	Zemfira Meftahatdinova (AZE)	73	25	98			OR
2nd place, silver medalist(s)	Svetlana Demina (RUS)	70	25	95			
3rd place, bronze medalist(s)	Diána Igaly (HUN)	71	22	93		4	
4	Tash Lonsdale (AUS)	70	23	93		3	
5	Cindy Shenberger (USA)	70	22	92	6		
6	Erdzhanik Avetisyan (RUS)	70	22	92	5		

OR Olympic record

== Sources ==
- Official Report of the XXVII Olympiad — Shooting (PDF).
