= Annmaree Roberts =

Australian sport shooter (born 1976)

Personal information
- Nationality: Australian
- Born: 3 November 1976 (age 48)
- Occupation: Shooter
- Height: 170 cm (5 ft 7 in)
- Weight: 64 kg (10 st 1 lb)

Sport
- Country: Australia
- Sport: Shooting
- Retired: 1 July 2001

Annmaree Roberts (born 3 November 1976 in Melbourne) is an Australian sport shooter. She competed at the Summer Olympics in 1996 and 2000. In 1996, she placed seventh in the women's double trap event; in 2000, she tied for ninth place in the women's double trap event.
