= Olga Tzavara =

Greek sport shooter

Personal information
- Nationality: Greek
- Born: 21 November 1924 Athens, Greece
- Died: 25 June 2013 (aged 88) Athens, Greece

Sport
- Sport: Shooting
- Event: Trap
Medal record
Individual
Event	1st	2nd	3rd
European Championships	5	0	0

Olga Tzavara (Όλγα Τζαβάρα, 21 November 1924 – 25 June 2013) was a Greek sport shooter who won five individual gold medals at senior level at the European Championships from 1958 to 1962. She was considered the "grande dame" of Greek shooting and a pioneer in women's shooting.

== See also ==
- Trap and double trap European Champions
