= Tash Lonsdale =

Australian sports shooter

Tash Lonsdale (born 25 October 1977 in Werribee, Victoria) is an Australian sport shooter. She competed at the 2000 Summer Olympics in the women's skeet event, in which she placed fourth.
