= Lin Yi-chun (sport shooter) =

Taiwanese sports shooter (born 1981)

Personal information
- Full name: Lin Yi-chun
- Nickname: Kitty
- Nationality: Chinese Taipei
- Born: 5 July 1981 (age 45) Taoyuan (now Taoyuan District, Taoyuan City), Taiwan
- Height: 1.61 m (5 ft 3 in)
- Weight: 70 kg (154 lb)

Sport
- Sport: Shooting
- Events: Trap (TR75); Double trap (DT120)
- Coached by: Tsai Hsi Cheng
Medal record
Women's shooting
Representing Chinese Taipei
World Championships
Gold medal – first place	2002 Lahti	Double trap
Gold medal – first place	2023 Baku	Trap
Silver medal – second place	2001 Cairo	Double trap
Asian Games
Bronze medal – third place	2006 Doha	Trap
Asian Championships
Gold medal – first place	2015 Kuwait City	Trap
Silver medal – second place	2007 Kuwait City	Trap
Bronze medal – third place	2019 Doha	Trap team
Asian Shotgun Championships
Gold medal – first place	2011 Kuala Lumpur	Trap

Lin Yi-chun (Chinese: 林 怡君; pinyin: Lín Yíjūn; born July 5, 1981, in Taoyuan (now Taoyuan District, Taoyuan City)) is a Taiwanese sport shooter. She won two medals, gold and silver, in the women's double trap, at the 2001 and 2002 ISSF World Shooting Championships in Cairo, Egypt and Lahti, Finland, respectively. She also captured a bronze medal in the women's trap at the 2006 Asian Games in Doha, Qatar, accumulating a score of 80 clay pigeons and a bonus of 1 target from a shoot-off. She won gold at the 2023 ISSF World Shooting Championships in trap.

Representing Chinese Taipei, Lin made her official debut at the 2000 Summer Olympics in Sydney, where she competed in the women's double trap only. She scored a total of 134 targets (100 in the preliminary rounds and 34 in the final), and a bonus of 14 from a shoot-off (against Canada's Cynthia Meyer). She finished in fourth place, narrowly missing out on the medal by five points behind defending Olympic champion Kim Rhode. At the 2004 Summer Olympics, Lin placed eighth in the qualifying rounds of the women's double trap, one point behind Australia's Susan Trindall after the final attempt, accumulating a score of 106 targets.

Eight years after competing in her last Olympics, Lin qualified for her third Chinese Taipei team, as a 31-year-old, at the 2012 Summer Olympics in London, by placing third in the women's trap at the 2011 ISSF World Cup series in Beijing, China. She scored a total of 68 clay pigeons in the qualifying rounds of the women's trap, one point ahead of U.S. shooter and Beijing bronze medalist Corey Cogdell. She finished in tenth place.
