= Sándor Dóra =

Hungarian sport shooter

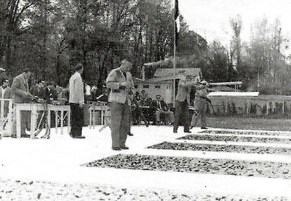
- Sándor Dóra in 1950.

Personal information
- Nationality: Hungarian
- Born: 24 February 1905 Hungary
- Died: 8 June 1986 (aged 81) Gödöllő, Hungary

Sport
- Sport: Shooting
- Event: Trap
Medal record
Individual
Event	1st	2nd	3rd
World Championships	0	0	1
European Championships	3	0	1
Total	3	0	2
Team
Event	1st	2nd	3rd
World Championships	4	1	2
European Championships	2	0	0
Total	6	1	2

Sándor Dóra (24 February 1905 - 8 June 1986) was a Hungarian sport shooter who won 14 medals at individual senior level at the World Championships and European Championships.

He was the brother of Pál Dóra, sport shooter champion too.

== Biography ==
With three victories in the trap at the European Championships, as the Italian Giovanni Pellielo, he is the most titled athlete in history in this discipline at the championships.

== See also ==
- Trap European Champions
