= Claude Foussier =

French sports shooter

Personal information
- Born: 19 April 1925 Paris, France
- Died: 13 December 2010 (aged 85)

Sport
- Sport: Sports shooting

Claude Foussier (19 April 1925 – 13 December 2010) was a French sports shooter. Foussier competed in the trap event at the 1960 Summer Olympics.

== Honors and awards ==
- Commander of the Order of Legion of Honour
