= Philippe Dupont (sport shooter) =

Belgian sports shooter

Personal information
- Nationality: Belgian
- Born: 28 February 1964 (age 61); Rocourt, Belgium

Sport
- Sport: Sports shooting

Philippe Dupont (born 28 February 1964) is a Belgian sports shooter. He competed in two events at the 1996 Summer Olympics.
