= Susanne Kiermayer =

German sport shooter (born 1968)

Personal information
- Nationality: Germany
- Born: 22 July 1968 (age 57) Zwiesel, Bavaria, West Germany
- Height: 1.83 m (6 ft 0 in)
- Weight: 75 kg (165 lb)

Sport
- Sport: Shooting
- Event(s): Trap, double trap
- Club: WTC Bayerwald
- Coached by: Willi Metelmann
Medal record
Women's shooting
Representing Germany
Olympic Games
Silver medal – second place	1996 Atlanta	Double trap
World Championships
Silver medal – second place	1998 Barcelona	Trap

Susanne Kiermayer (born 22 July 1968 in Zwiesel, Bavaria) is a retired German sport shooter. Kiermayer had won a total of nine medals (one gold, four silver, and four bronze) for both trap and double trap shooting at the ISSF World Cup series. She also captured a silver medal in the same discipline at the 1998 ISSF World Shooting Championships in Barcelona, Spain, striking a total of 91 clay pigeons. Kiermayer is currently a vice-president of the German Shooting Federation (German: Deutscher Schützenbund).

Kiermayer emerged as one of Germany's most prominent shooters in its Olympic history. She won the silver medal in the inaugural women's double trap at the 1996 Summer Olympics in Atlanta, United States by two points behind winner Kim Rhode of the United States, with a total score of 139 targets (105 in the preliminary rounds and 34 in the final) and a bonus of two from a shoot-off (against Australia's Deserie Huddleston). Kiermayer achieved a fifth-place finish each in the women's trap at the 2000 Summer Olympics in Sydney and at the 2004 Summer Olympics in Athens, accumulating scores of 86 and 79 clay pigeons, respectively. She also competed in the women's double trap at these Olympic games, but she neither reached the final round, nor claimed an Olympic medal.

Twelve years after competing in her first Olympics, Kiermayer qualified for her fourth German team, as a 40-year-old, at the 2008 Summer Olympics in Beijing, by placing second in the trap shooting from the 2006 ISSF World Cup series in Cairo, Egypt, posting her score of 89 hits. She finished only in eighth place by one point behind Italy's Deborah Gelisio, for a total score of 65 targets.

== Olympic results ==
Event	1996	2000	2004	2008
Double trap	(silver) Silver; 105+34	9th 98	11th 101	—N/a
Trap	—N/a	5th 66+20	5th 62+17	8th 65
