= Gao E (sport shooter) =

Chinese sport shooter (born 1962)

Personal information
- Born: November 7, 1962 (age 63)
Medal record
Women's shooting
Representing China
Olympic Games
| Bronze medal – third place | 2000 Sydney | trap |
| Bronze medal – third place | 2004 Athens | double trap |
Asian Championships
| Gold medal – first place | 2007 Kuwait City | Trap eam |
Asian Clay Shooting Championships
| Gold medal – first place | 2009 Almaty | Trap |
| Gold medal – first place | 2009 Almaty | Trap team |

Gao E (Chinese: 高娥; pinyin: Gāo É; born November 7, 1962, in Shenyang, Liaoning) is a female Chinese sports shooter who won two Olympic bronze medals, at the 2000 Summer Olympics and the 2004 Summer Olympics.

== Olympic results ==
| Event | 1988 | 1992 | 1996 | 2000 | 2004 |
|---|---|---|---|---|---|
| Trap (mixed) | 40th 137 | — | Not held | | |
| Women's trap | Not held | | | (bronze) Bronze; 68+22 | 17th 48 |
| Women's double trap | Not held | | 7th 103 | 9th 98 | (bronze) Bronze; 107+35 |
