= Satu Pusila =

Finnish sport shooter (born 1962)

Personal information
- Nationality: Finnish
- Born: 25 April 1962 (age 64) Orimattila, Finland
- Height: 1.69 m (5 ft 7 in)
- Weight: 66 kg (146 lb)

Sport
- Sport: Shooting
- Event: Trap
- Start activity: 1982
Medal record
Individual
Event	1st	2nd	3rd
World Championships	3	1	1
World Cup	2	1	2
World Cup Final	1	2	0
European Championships	3	6	1
Total	9	10	4
Team
Event	1st	2nd	3rd
World Championships	0	0	1
European Championships	2	3	0
Total	2	3	1

Satu Pusila (born 25 April 1962) is a Finnish sport shooter. She competed in the trap shooting events at the 1996 and 2000 Summer Olympics.

== Olympic results ==
Event	1996	2000
Trap (women)	Not held	13th
Double trap (women)	T-11th	17th

== See also ==
- Trap World Champions
- Trap European Champions
