= Josef Panáček =

Czechoslovak sport shooter (1937–2022)

Medal record

Men's shooting

Representing Czechoslovakia

Olympic Games
Gold medal – first place	1976 Montreal	Skeet

Josef Panáček (8 September 1937 – 5 April 2022) was a Czechoslovak sport shooter and Olympic Champion. He won a gold medal in skeet shooting at the 1976 Summer Olympics in Montreal.
