= María Quintanal =

Spanish sport shooter (born 1969)

Olympic medal record

Women's shooting
Silver medal – second place	2004 Athens	Trap

María Quintanal Zubizarreta (born December 17, 1969, in Biscay) is a sport shooter from Gran Canaria, Spain. The 2003 world champion in Double Trap, she competed at the 2004 Summer Olympics and won a silver medal in Trap. She also competed in the Double Trap event, but placed 13th. She has also competed for the Dominican Republic in the Central American and Caribbean Games.

Olympic results
Event	1996	2000	2004
Trap	Not held	—	(silver) Silver; 65+19
Double trap	11th 100	—	13th 97
