= Ricardo Sancho =

Spanish sports shooter

Personal information
- Born: 11 March 1942 (age 84) Barcelona, Spain

Sport
- Sport: Sports shooting

Ricardo Sancho (born 11 March 1942) is a Spanish former sports shooter. He competed at the 1972, 1980 and the 1984 Summer Olympics.
