= Yukie Nakayama =

Japanese sports shooter

Personal information
- Nationality: Japan
- Born: 7 March 1979 (age 47) Yūki, Ibaraki
- Height: 1.61 m (5 ft 3 1/2 in)
- Weight: 49 kg (108 lb)

Sport
- Sport: Shooting
- Events: Trap, double trap
- Club: Hitachi Kenki (JPN)
Medal record
Women's shooting
Representing Japan
World Championships
Silver medal – second place	2013 Lima	Trap
Asian Championships
Gold medal – first place	2012 Doha	Trap team
Bronze medal – third place	2012 Doha	Trap
Bronze medal – third place	2019 Doha	Trap
Asian Shotgun Championships
Silver medal – second place	2014 Al-Ain	Trap team
Bronze medal – third place	2014 Al-Ain	Trap

Yukie Nakayama (中山 由起枝, Nakayama Yukie; born March 7, 1979 in Yūki, Ibaraki) is a Japanese trap shooter, who competed at three Olympic games and won the silver medal at the 2013 ISSF World Championships. Nakayama made her official Olympic debut at the 2000 Summer Olympics in Sydney, where she finished thirteenth in the women's double trap, with a score of 94 points, tying her position with Finland's Pia Julin.

At the 2008 Summer Olympics in Beijing, Nakayama competed in trap shooting, where she scored a total of 67 points in the qualifying round. She added nineteen more shots to obtain a total of 86 points in the final, but missed out of the bronze medal triumph to United States' Corey Cogdell, after competing in a four-person shoot-out

At the 2012 Summer Olympics in London, Nakayama, however, failed to qualify for the final, after hitting a total of sixty-five targets in women's trap shooting, finishing in fifteenth place, behind her former opponent and Olympic silver medalist Daina Gudzinevičiūtė of Lithuania

Nakayama currently lives in Utsunomiya, Tochigi, with her daughter.
