= Yelena Rabaya =

Russian sport shooter

Personal information
- Full name: Yelena Pavlovna Rabaya
- Nationality: Russian
- Born: Yelena Shishirina; 3 April 1960 (age 66) Tula, Russia
- Height: 1.62 m (5 ft 4 in)
- Weight: 66 kg (146 lb)

Sport
- Sport: Shooting
- Event: Trap
- Club: SK Tulatermet
- Start activity: 1978
- Coached by: Boris Rabaya
Medal record
Individual
Event	1st	2nd	3rd
World Championships	2	5	1
European Championships	12	2	4
Total	14	7	5
Team
Event	1st	2nd	3rd
World Championships	5	2	3
European Championships	3	3	4
Total	8	5	7

Yelena Rabaya nee Shishirina (born 3 April 1960) is a Russian former sport shooter who won several medals at senior level at the World Championships and European Championships. She also competed in the women's double trap event at the 1996 Summer Olympics.

== See also ==
- Trap World Champions
- Double trap World Champions
- Trap and double trap European Champions
