= Ernest Fear =

British sports shooter

Personal information
- Born: 3 October 1903 Long Ashton, Somerset, England
- Died: 22 July 1982 (aged 78) Sheffield, England

Sport
- Sport: Sports shooting

Ernest Fear (5 October 1903 – 22 July 1982) was a British sports shooter. He competed in the trap event at the 1956 Summer Olympics.
