= Colavito =

Colavito is a surname. Notable people with the surname include:

- Jason Colavito (born 1981), American author and independent scholar specializing in the study of fringe theories
- Rocky Colavito (1933–2024), American baseball player, coach, and television sports commentator
- Steve Colavito (born 1951), American football player
