= Andreas Scherhaufer =

Austrian sport shooter

Andreas Scherhaufer (born 24 July 1970 in Vienna) is an Austrian trap shooter. He competed in the trap event at the 2012 Summer Olympics and placed 17th in the qualification round.
