= Sophia Miaouli =

Cypriot sport shooter (born 1970)

Sophia Miaouli (born January 18, 1970, in Nicosia) is a Cypriot sport shooter. She competed at the 2000 Summer Olympics in the women's skeet event, in which she tied for ninth place.
