= Anne Focan =

Belgian sport shooter

Anne Focan (born 18 November 1961 in Namur) is a Belgian sport shooter. She competed in trap shooting events at the 1996 and 2000 Summer Olympics.

== Olympic results ==
Event	1996	2000
Trap (women)	Not held	4th
Double trap (women)	20th	7th
