= Gemma Usieto =

Spanish sports shooter (born 1965)

Personal information
- Nationality: Spanish
- Born: 8 January 1965 (age 61) Huesca, Spain

Sport
- Sport: Sports shooting

Gemma Usieto (born 8 January 1965) is a Spanish sports shooter. She competed at the 1988 Summer Olympics, the 1992 Summer Olympics and the 1996 Summer Olympics.
