= Xavier Bouvier =

Swiss sports shooter

Personal information
- Nationality: Swiss
- Born: 4 January 1957 (age 68)

Sport
- Sport: Sports shooting

Xavier Bouvier (born 4 January 1957) is a Swiss sports shooter. He competed at the 1992 Summer Olympics and the 1996 Summer Olympics.
