= Silvano Canonico =

Italian sport shooter

Personal information
- National team: Italy
- Born: 1937 Lomazzo, Italy
- Died: 29 September 2009 (aged 71–72) Valdidentro, Italy

Sport
- Sport: Shooting
- Event: Trap
Medal record
Individual
Event	1st	2nd	3rd
European Championships	1	0	0
Team
Event	1st	2nd	3rd
European Championships	2	0	0

Silvano Canonico (1937 – 29 September 2009) was an Italian sport shooter European Champion at individual senior level.

== Death ==
Silvano Canonico died in an accident on 29 September 2009, at the age of 72, in Valtellina, near the city of Lomazzo where he resided. Went to look for mushrooms with a friend, he fell into the bank of a river.
