= Dorota Chytrowska-Mika =

Polish sports shooter

Personal information
- Nationality: Polish
- Born: 1 September 1954 (age 70); Warsaw, Poland

Sport
- Sport: Sports shooting

Dorota Chytrowska-Mika (born 1 September 1954) is a Polish sports shooter. She competed in the mixed skeet event at the 1992 Summer Olympics.
