= Michel Prévost (sport shooter) =

French sports shooter

Personal information
- Born: 7 August 1925
- Died: 1 August 2016 (aged 90)

Sport
- Sport: Sports shooting

Michel Prévost (7 August 1925 – 1 August 2016) was a French sports shooter. He competed at the 1956 Summer Olympics and the 1964 Summer Olympics.
