= Juan Ávalos =

Spanish sports shooter

Personal information
- Born: 8 January 1941 (age 85) Madrid, Spain

Sport
- Sport: Sports shooting

Juan Ávalos (born 8 January 1941) is a Spanish former sports shooter. He competed at the 1972, 1976 and the 1984 Summer Olympics.
