= Olaf Kirchstein =

German sport shooter (born 1965)

Olaf Kirchstein (born 4 July 1965) is a German sport shooter who competed in the 2004 Summer Olympics.
