= Roberta Pelosi =

Italian sport shooter

Personal information
- Full name: Roberta Pelosi
- Nationality: Italy
- Born: 11 December 1960 (age 65) Rome, Italy
- Height: 1.60 m (5 ft 3 in)
- Weight: 63 kg (139 lb)

Sport
- Sport: Shooting
- Event: Trap (TR75)
- Club: Tiro a Volo Valle Aniene
- Coached by: Luigi Pelosi; Albano Pera
Medal record
Women's shooting
Representing Italy
World Championships
Silver medal – second place	2003 Nicosia	TR75

Roberta Pelosi (born 11 December 1960, in Rome) is an Italian sport shooter. She has been selected to compete for Italy at the 2004 Summer Olympics, and has established a career tally of eighteen medals in a major international competition, including a world-record breaking gold at the 1998 ISSF World Cup meet in Cairo, Egypt and a silver in women's trap at the 2003 World Shotgun Championships in Nicosia, Cyprus. Pelosi is a member of Valle Aniene Target Shooting Club (Italian: Tiro a Volo Valle Aniene), and a resident athlete of the Italian Clay Shooting Federation (Italian: Federazione italiana Tiro al Volo), where she trains under head coach and 1996 Olympic double trap medalist Albano Pera.

Pelosi qualified for the Italian team, as a 43-year-old, in the women's trap at the 2004 Summer Olympics in Athens. She had registered a minimum qualifying score of 67 to fill out one of the Olympic places awarded to Italy from her top finish at the 2002 ISSF World Cup meet in Suhl, Germany. Pelosi scored 58 hits out of a possible 75 to impose a three-way tie with Great Britain's Sarah Gibbins and 2000 Olympic double trap champion Pia Hansen of Sweden for ninth place in the qualifying round, just two targets away from the final cutoff.
