= Burckhardt Hoppe =

German sports shooter

Personal information
- Born: 10 July 1946 (age 79) Hoym, Germany

Sport
- Sport: Sports shooting

Burckhardt Hoppe (born 10 July 1946) is a German former sports shooter. He competed at the 1972, 1976, and 1980 Summer Olympics for East Germany.
