= Daina Gudzinevičiūtė =

Lithuanian sport shooter

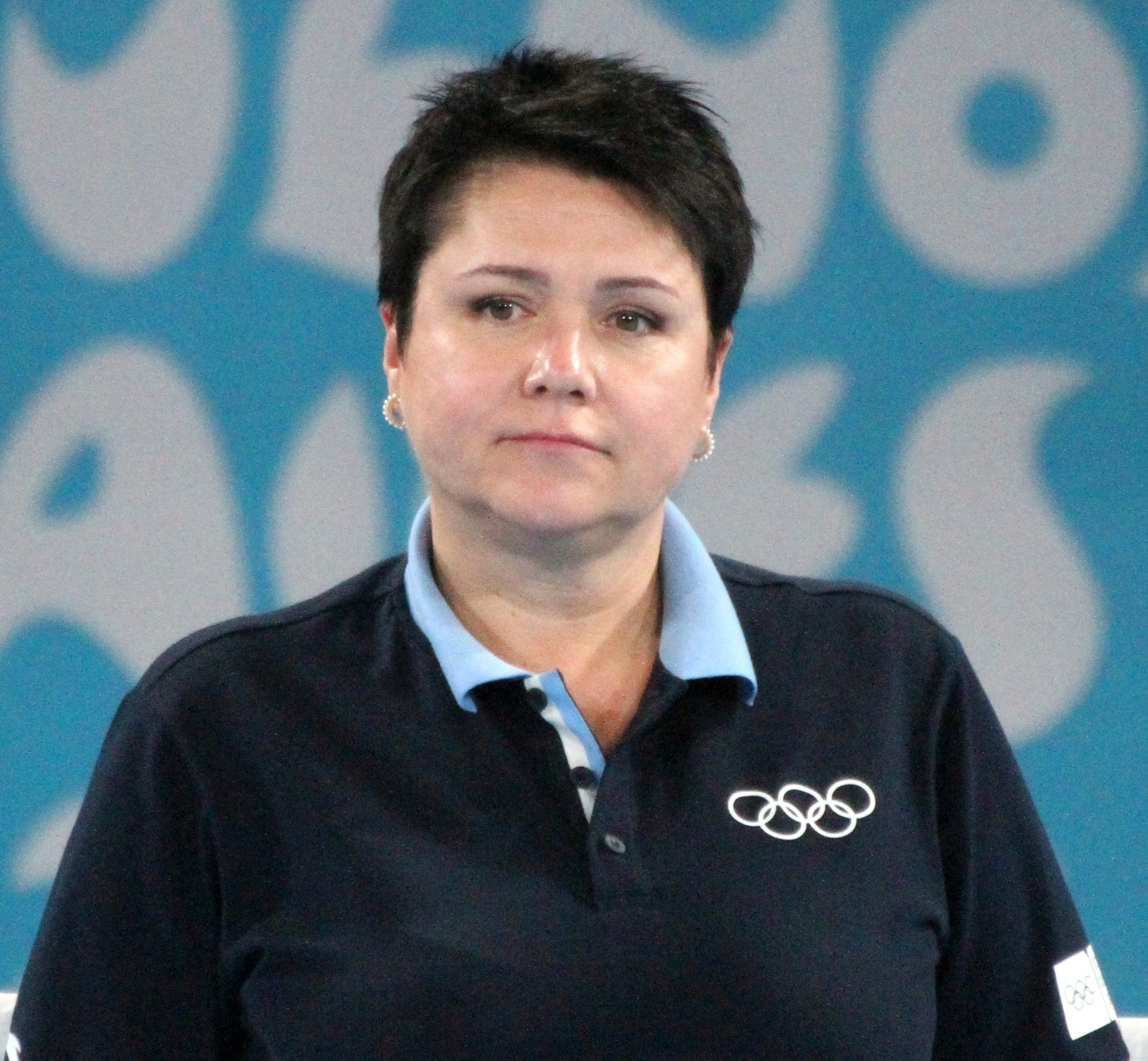
- Gudzinevičiūtė at the YOG 2018

Personal information
- Born: 23 December 1965 (age 60) Vilnius, Lithuanian SSR, Soviet Union
Medal record
Women's shooting
Representing Lithuania
Olympic Games
Gold medal – first place	2000 Sydney	Trap
World Championships
Silver medal – second place	2002 Lahti	Trap
European Championships
Silver medal – second place	1992 Istanbul	Double Trap
Silver medal – second place	2005 Belgrade	Trap
Silver medal – second place	2009 Osijek	Trap
Bronze medal – third place	1992 Istanbul	Trap
Representing Soviet Union
World Championships
Gold medal – first place	1989 Montecatini Terme	Team
European Championships
Gold medal – first place	1988 Istanbul	Trap
Gold medal – first place	1988 Istanbul	Team

Daina Gudzinevičiūtė (born 23 December 1965, in Vilnius) is an Olympic shooting champion from Lithuania, president of the National Olympic Committee, and a member of the International Olympic Committee.

== Shooting ==
Trap shooting for women was first introduced in the 2000 Summer Olympics in Sydney. Gudzinevičiūtė scored 71 hits in the qualifying round and then hit 22 out of 25 targets in the final. This was one more than Delphine Racinet's score. As the event was held in the Olympic Games for the first time, Gudzinevičiūtė also set an Olympic record. It was a very unexpected victory for Lithuania and their first medal at Sydney.

After the Sydney success it was expected that Gudzinevičiūtė would perform well in the 2004 Summer Olympics in Athens, but she scored only 55 hits and landed on the 14th place among 17 contestants. She complained about the weather with strong gusts which was an obstacle for all shooters: the best result (after the final) was just 88.

Other results:

- 1988 Europe championship 1st (under the Soviet Union flag)
- 1989 World championship 1st
- 1992 Europe championship 2nd, 3rd
- 1994 World championship 4th
- 2001 Special World championship in Cairo 9th
- 2002 World championship in Lahti 2nd
- 2003 "Grand Prix" in Cyprus 2nd
- 2004 World Cup in Athens 11th
- 2005 Europe championship in Belgrade 2nd

Olympic results
Event	1996	2000	2004	2008	2012
Trap	Not held	(gold) Gold; 71+22	14th 55	5th 69+17	14th 66
Double trap	10th 101	—	—	Not held	Not held

== Post-shooting career ==
After the Sydney games, she became popular in Lithuania. She was invited to host a documentary television show "Farai", which shows daily work of Lithuanian policemen. She also worked with the State Border Guard Service.

In 2012, she beat Virgilijus Alekna in the election for the president of the National Olympic Committee of Lithuania.

In 2018, Gudzinevičiūtė became the first Lithuanian to be elected into IOC.

Records
Preceded by First	Olympic Women's Trap Qualification Record; 71 points, 2000 Sydney	Succeeded by (Italy) Jessica Rossi; 2012 London
Preceded by First	Olympic Women's Trap Final Record; 93 points, 2000 Sydney	Succeeded by None (changed rules in 2005)
