= Raimo Kauppila =

Finnish sports shooter

Personal information
- Nationality: Finnish
- Born: 29 July 1958 (age 67) Nivala, Finland
- Height: 1.81 m (5 ft 11 in)
- Weight: 88 kg (194 lb)

Sport
- Sport: Sports shooting
- Event: TR125, DT150
Medal record
Event	1st	2nd	3rd
European Championships	0	7	2

Raimo Kauppila (born 29 July 1958) is a Finnish sports shooter. He competed at the 1996 Summer Olympics and the 2000 Summer Olympics.

== Career ==
During his sport career he won nine international medals at European Championships, four individual and five with the Finnish team, all of these in the double trap.

== Achievements ==
Individual

Year	Competition	Venue	Rank	Event	Score	Notes
1995	European Shooting Championships	(Finland) Lahti	2nd	Double trap	136	
1996	Olympic Games	(United States) Atlanta	15th	Double trap	133	
1997	European Shooting Championships	(Finland) Sipoo	2nd	Double trap	140	
1999	European Shooting Championships	(France) Poussan	2nd	Double trap	131	
2000	Olympic Games	(Australia) Sydney	10th	Double trap	134	
2002	European Shooting Championships	(Italy) Lonato	3rd	Double trap	135	
