= Maarit Lepomäki =

Finnish sports shooter (born 1956)

Personal information
- Full name: Maarit Hillevi Lepomäki
- Nationality: Finland
- Born: 15 December 1956 (age 69) Pori, Finland
- Height: 1.58 m (5 ft 2 in)
- Weight: 64 kg (141 lb)

Sport
- Sport: Shooting
- Event: Skeet (SK75)
- Club: Satakunnan Ampujat
- Coached by: Lauri Siltavirta
Medal record
Women's shooting
Representing Finland
World Cup Final
Silver medal – second place	2004 Maribor	SK75

Maarit Hillevi Lepomäki (born 15 December 1956) is a Finnish sport shooter. She produced a career tally of nine medals, including a silver in skeet shooting at the 2004 ISSF World Cup final in Maribor, Slovenia, and was selected to compete for Finland in two editions of the Olympic Games (2000 and 2004).

Lepomaki was born in Pori. Having pursued the sport for more than two decades, she trained full-time for Satakunta Shooting Club (Finnish: Satakunnan Ampujat) in her native Pori under personal coach Lauri Siltavirta.

Lepomaki's major Olympic debut came at the 2000 Summer Olympics in Sydney, where she wound up to eleventh in the inaugural women's skeet with a score of 68 out of 75 hits, tying her position with Italy's Cristina Vitali.

At the 2004 Summer Olympics in Athens, Lepomaki qualified for the second time, as the oldest athlete of the Finnish team (aged 47), in the women's skeet. Less than two years before the Games, she had registered a mandatory minimum score of 65 and eventually won the gold medal at the ISSF World Cup meet in Suhl, Germany, occupying one of the available Olympic quota places for her team. Lepomaki aggregated a total record of 67 out of 75 clay targets to share a three-way tie with 2000 Olympic silver medalist and world record holder Svetlana Demina of Russia and 43-year-old Kim Yeun-hee of South Korea for the ninth position, failing to advance to the final round.
