= Cindy Gentry =

American sports shooter

Personal information
- Born: 14 October 1954 (age 70); Fort Worth, Texas, United States

Sport
- Sport: Sport shooting

Cindy Bonden Gentry (born 14 October 1954) is an American former sport shooter who competed in the 2000 Summer Olympics.
