= Erdzhanik Avetisyan =

Russian sport shooter

Medal record

Women's shooting

Representing Russia

World Championships
Gold medal – first place	1999 Tampere	Skeet
Gold medal – first place	2006 Zagreb	Skeet

World Cup
Gold medal – first place	2007 Belgrade	Skeet

Erdzhanik Avetisyan (Russian: Ерджаник Жораевна Аветисян, born December 7, 1969, in Aygezard, Armenia) is an Armenian-Russian sport shooter, specializing in the skeet shootings event.

Avetisyan first started shooting as a 16-year-old.

Avetisyan competed at the 2000 Summer Olympics, at which she placed sixth in the women's skeet event. She also won the 1999 World Shotgun Championships, 2006 World Shooting Championships and 2007 World Cup in women's skeet.
