= István Putz =

Hungarian sports shooter (born 1955)

Personal information
- Nationality: Hungarian
- Born: 1 August 1955 (age 69); Veszprém, Hungary

Sport
- Sport: Sports shooting

István Putz (born 1 August 1955) is a Hungarian sports shooter. He competed at the 1980 Summer Olympics and the 1992 Summer Olympics.
