= Giulia Iannotti =

Italian sports shooter

Personal information
- Nationality: Italian
- Born: 14 February 1978 (age 47); Naples, Italy

Sport
- Sport: Sports shooting

Giulia Iannotti (born 14 February 1978) is an Italian sports shooter.

She hails from Vallo della Lucania. She finished 17th in the women's trap event at the 2000 Summer Olympics.

At the 2007 ISSF World Cup event in Maribor, she equalled the world record, shooting 74 points. In Belgrade, she won the 2007 ISSF World Cup final and the 2008 ISSF World Cup event. At the same track, she later finished 20th in the 2011 ISSF World Cup event. She still managed to finish top 5 in the World Cup as of 2012.
