= Pia Julin =

Finnish sports shooter

Personal information
- Nationality: Finnish
- Born: 26 December 1969 (age 55); Kauniainen, Finland

Sport
- Sport: Sports shooting

Pia Julin (born 26 December 1969) is a Finnish sports shooter. She competed in the women's double trap event at the 2000 Summer Olympics.
