= Sarah Gibbins =

British sport shooter

Sarah Gibbins (born 10 June 1970 in Northampton, Northamptonshire, England) is a sport shooter who represented Great Britain at the 2004 Summer Olympics.

At the 2004 Summer Olympics in Athens she participated in the women's trap event, finishing tied for ninth position.
