= Delphine Réau =

French sports shooter

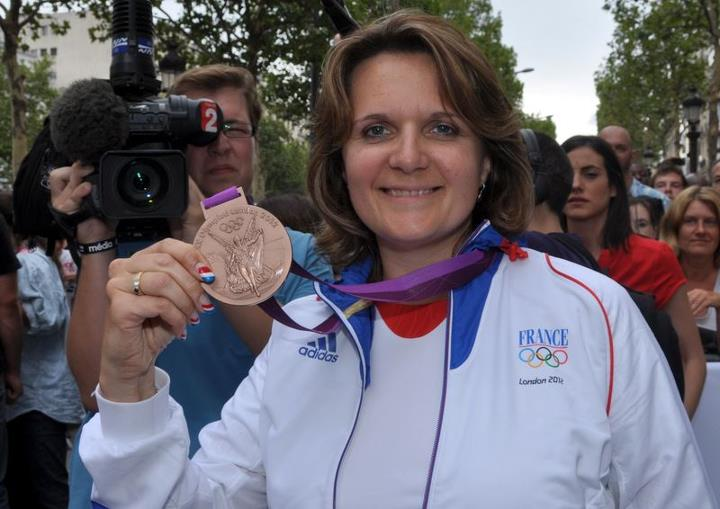
- Réau in 2012

Medal record

Women's shooting

Representing France

Olympic Games
Silver medal – second place	2000 Sydney	Trap
Bronze medal – third place	2012 London	Trap

Delphine Jeanine Annie Réau (née Racinet, born 19 September 1973 in Melun) is a French sport shooter who competed in the 2000 Summer Olympics and in the 2012 Summer Olympics.
