= Pia Hansen =

Swedish sports shooter

Medal record

Representing Sweden

Women's shooting

Olympic Games
Gold medal – first place	2000 Sydney	Double trap

Pia Hansen (born 25 September 1965) is a Swedish sport shooter. She originally competed in Nordic Trap, but then moved on to Olympic trap and double trap. She won the latter at the 2000 Olympics in Sydney, and she also finished eighth in trap. In Athens four years later, she finished ninth in both events.

Olympic results
Event	2000	2004
Trap	8th 64	9th 58
Double trap	(gold) Gold; 112+36	9th 105
