= Deborah Gelisio =

Italian sport shooter (born 1976)

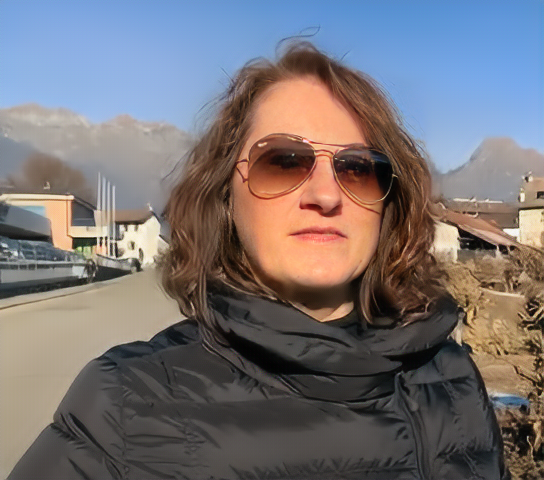
- Gelisio in 2019

Personal information
- Nationality: Italian
- Born: 26 February 1976 (age 50) Belluno, Italy
- Height: 1.66 m (5 ft 5 in)
- Weight: 65 kg (143 lb)

Sport
- Country: Italy
- Sport: Shooting
- Club: G.S. Forestale
- Retired: 2017
Medal record
Individual podiums
Event	1st	2nd	3rd
Olympic Games	0	1	0
World Championships (shotgun)	4	1	0
World Cup Final (shotgun)	5	2	1
World Cup (shotgun)	7	3	2
European Championships	10	4	5
Total	26	11	8
Team podiums
Event	1st	2nd	3rd
World Championships	5	3	0
European Championships	7	3	1
Total	12	6	1
Olympic Games
Silver medal – second place	2000 Sydney	Double trap

Deborah Gelisio (born 26 February 1976) is a former Italian sport shooter who won a silver medal in Double trap at the 2000 Summer Olympics.

== Biography ==
In her career, she also won five medals at ISSF World Shooting Championships.

== See also ==
- Italian sportswomen multiple medalists at Olympics and World Championships
