= Broman =

Broman is a surname. Notable people with the name include:

- Alby Broman (1917–1977), Australian rules footballer
- Arne Broman (1913–1995), Swedish mathematician working on analysis
- Bertel Broman (1889–1952), Finnish sailor
- Erland Broman (1704–1757), Swedish official and noble
- Johan Broman (1877–1953), Finnish lawyer and politician
- John Broman (born 1958), American ski jumper
- Susan Broman (born 1959), Finnish competitive figure skater
- Väinö Broman (born 1932), Finnish sports shooter

== See also ==
- 4575 Broman, main-belt asteroid
