= Kaoliang liquor =

Strong distilled liquor of Chinese origin

Chinese name
- Chinese: 高粱酒
- Literal meaning: sorghum liquor
Transcriptions
Standard Mandarin
- Hanyu Pinyin: gāoliángjiǔ
- Wade–Giles: kao-liang-chiu
Yue: Cantonese
- Jyutping: gou1 loeng4 zau2
Southern Min
- Hokkien POJ: ko-liâng-chiú

Korean name
- Hangul: 고량주
Transcriptions
- Revised Romanization: goryangju

Kaoliang liquor, Gaolang liquor or sorghum liquor is a strong distilled liquor of Chinese origin made from fermented sorghum. It is a type of light-aroma baijiu. The liquor originates from Dazhigu (大直沽, located east of Tianjin), first appearing in the Ming Dynasty and is widely consumed across northern China in provinces such as Hebei, Shaanxi, and Shandong. It is primarily made and sold in China and Taiwan, but is also popular in Korea, where it is called goryangju (hangul: 고량주; hanja: 高粱酒) or bbaegal (which originates from the Chinese character 白乾). Kaoliang ranges usually between 38 and 63 percent alcohol by volume.

== Famous brands from Taiwan ==
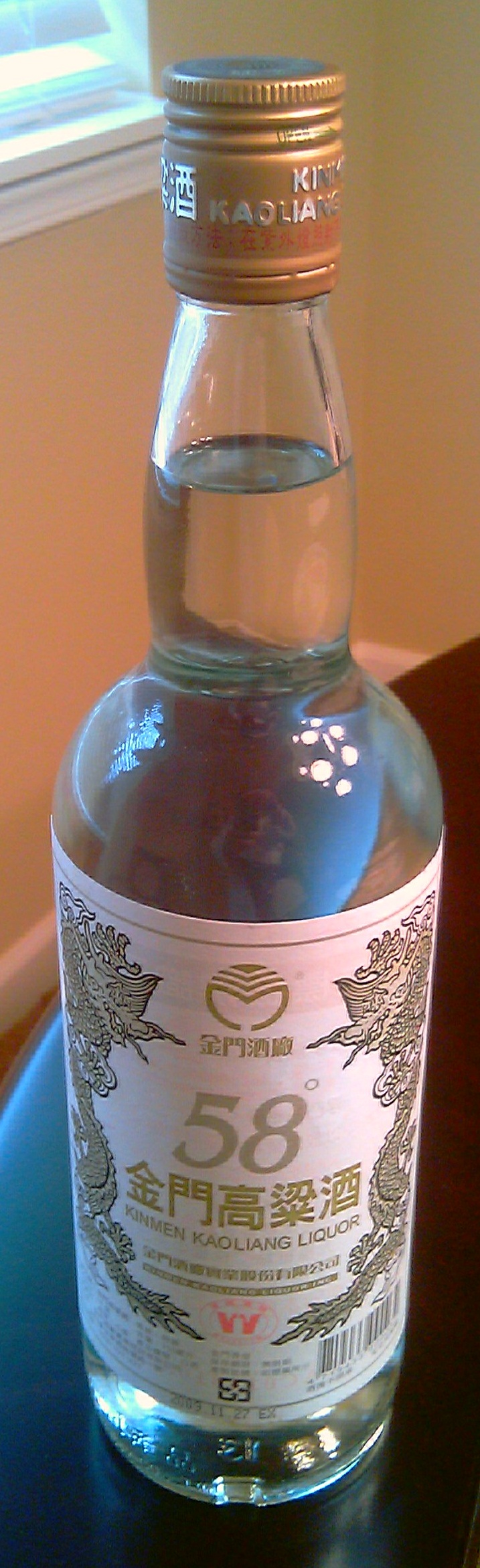
Kinmen 58% Kaoliang

Kinmen Kaoliang Liquor is one of the most popular brands of kaoliang in Taiwan. As its name indicates, it is produced on the island of Kinmen. The mainstays of the range are the standard 58 percent and 38 percent alcohol bottlings. Kinmen's kaoliang production traces its roots back to the Chinese Civil War when Chinese nationalist general Hu Lien encouraged Kinmenese farmers to grow sorghum to produce hard liquor as importing alcohol from Taiwan caused financial strain. Kaoliang liquor has become an integral part of Kinmen's economy and plays a significant role in the culture of Kinmen.

Yusan Kaoliang Chiew (Chinese: 玉山高粱酒; pinyin: Yùshān Gāoliáng Jiǔ) is produced by the Taiwan Tobacco and Liquor Corporation. It is named after the highest mountain in Taiwan, Yushan. One of the most notable products in the range is an "X.O." kaoliang aged for five years in tanks before bottling.

Matsu Tunnel 88 Kaoliang Liquor (Chinese: 馬祖八八坑道高粱酒; pinyin: Mǎzǔ Bā Bā Kēngdào Gāoliáng Jiǔ) is produced by the Matsu Distillery in Nangan Township, Lienchiang County. The name is derived from the name of an abandoned military tunnel called Tunnel 88 which the distillery took over as storage space for their kaoliang and aged rice wine. All of the distillery's aged kaoliangs are stored in the tunnel for at least five years.

== In popular culture ==
- In the 2021 music video The Wall (牆外) by Namewee, which has over 17 million views on YouTube, the father is shown drinking Jinmen Kaoliang liquor several times. The song, sponsored by the Jinmen Tourism Association, tells on the surface a love story between a free-spirited boy and a girl from a strict household. But the story symbolises the people of China and Taiwan, who share a common root in Chinese ancestry and long for deeper connection, yet are separated by politics and the Internet firewall.
- In the 1959 Masaki Kobayashi film The Human Condition I: No Greater Love, Chinese prisoners are said to be served a diet consisting of sorghum wine and soy pulp.
- The 1987 Zhang Yimou film Red Sorghum is set in a rural kaoliang distillery in the Shandong province of China.
- The fictional character Li Kao, from Barry Hughart's award-winning novels Bridge of Birds, The Story of the Stone, and Eight Skilled Gentlemen, is named after kaoliang; his mother died in childbirth while requesting a last drink, and the abbot attending the birth mistook the syllables "Kao...li...kao..." as her intended name for the child. In Bridge of Birds, while telling the story of his birth, Li Kao describes kaoliang as "the finest paint thinner and worst wine ever invented".

== See also ==
- Baijiu
- Chinese alcoholic beverages
- Maotai
