= Transcendent Pig =

Character in Young Wizards series of books

The Transcendent Pig is a character in Diane Duane's Young Wizards series and is mentioned in each of Barry Hughart's Master Li and Number Ten Ox books (Bridge of Birds, The Story of the Stone and Eight Skilled Gentlemen). The pig originates in Chinese mythology:

"Cattle are under the protection of the god of Cattle-breeding, aided by the King-of-Oxen and the Transcendent Pig. During their lifetime they were both dangerous giants. The King-of-Oxen, who terrified his enemies by his enormous horns and buffalo ears, was yet tamed by the lady Nu-kua, who threaded a miraculous rope through his nose. Equally ferocious and hideous, with his black face, the Transcendent Pig had the impudence to swallow Erh-lang, the nephew of the August Personage of Jade himself, but he regretted it, for Erh-lang slew him."

In the Young Wizards series, the character is first mentioned in So You Want to Be a Wizard (the first book) and first appears in The Wizard's Dilemma (the fifth book). The pig is omnipresent, and tends to speak of past events as if they are happening right now. Its origins are unknown, even to The Powers that Be, who did not create it.

Wizards in the books are instructed to ask the pig what the meaning of life is as soon as they meet it, just in case the pig slips up and answers. He is aware that this is what they are trying to do and is relatively good natured about it.
