= ISSF World Shooting Championships =

World championship in shooting

- Status: Active
- Genre: Shooting World Championships
- Frequency: Annual
- Country: Varying
- Years active: 1897–present
- Inaugurated: 1897 Lyon (France)
- Most recent: 2025 Cairo (Egypt)
- Previous event: 2023 Baku (Azerbaijan)
- Next event: 2026 Doha (Qatar)
- Organiser: International Shooting Sport Federation
- Website: issf-sports.org

The ISSF World Shooting Championships are governed by the International Shooting Sport Federation. These championships, including all ISSF shooting events, are held every four years since 1954. For the shotgun events only, there is an additional World Championship competition in odd years.

== History ==
World Shooting Championships began in 1897, after the successful 1896 Summer Olympics, and although the ISSF was not founded until 1907, these early competitions are still seen by the organization as the beginning of a continuous row of championships. By this logic, the 2006 competition in Zagreb was called the 49th ISSF World Shooting Championships.

== World Shooting Championships ==
The World Championships were held each year from 1897 to 1931, with the exception of the years 1915–1920 (interruption by World War I) and 1926. From 1933 to 1949, they were held biennially, although the 1941–1945 competitions were canceled (again, because of world war). The current schedule, with large World Championships only every four years, was adapted in 1954.

Originally, 300 metre rifle (in various positions) was the only discipline on the programme, despite many other events having been included in the Olympics. In 1900, 50 metre pistol was added. This programme was in use until 1929, the only change being the addition of 300 metre army rifle, with mandatory use of the host nation's army weapon, in 1911. The 1929 championships in Stockholm saw the addition of most of the remaining events from the Olympic programme: 100 metre running deer, 50 metre rifle and trap. 25 metre rapid fire pistol had to wait until 1933.

Immediately after World War II, 300 metre standard rifle (with more strict rules than 300 metre rifle but less than 300 metre army rifle) was added along with 25 metre center-fire pistol and skeet. There was also briefly a combined 50 and 100 m rifle competition. Specific women's events began to be slowly added from 1958, although women had previously, and at times successfully, been allowed to compete alongside the men. The last remaining army rifle event and 100 metre running deer were dropped in 1966, the latter in favour of 50 metre running target. 50 metre standard rifle was also added for both men and women, but was soon dropped for the men due to the similarity to 50 metre rifle. The 1970 World Championships in Phoenix added airgun events, 25 metre standard pistol and the mixed running target competition. 10 metre running target was added in 1981.

For the 1994 competitions in Milan, a number of profound changes were made. First, junior competitions were added (like the senior championships, these are only held every four years); they had previously been tested in the special shotgun and airgun championships. Second, there were no longer medals awarded in single positions in the 300 metre and 50 metre rifle matches (except for the prone position, which has its own match). Third, double trap had been introduced five years earlier in Montecatini Terme and now made its way into the large championships. With only minor additions, the 1994 programme is still in use.

=== Before World War I (1897 to 1914) and Interwar period (1921 to 1939) ===
Number	Year	Venue	Individual events					Team events					Total	Medal count winner
Number	Year	Venue	Rifle	Pistol	SG	RT	Total	Rifle	Pistol	SG	RT	Total	Total	Medal count winner
1	1897	(France) Lyon	4				4	1				1	5	Switzerland
2	1898	(Italy) Turin	4				4	1				1	5	France
3	1899	(Netherlands) Loosduinen	4				4	1				1	5	Switzerland
4	1900	(France) Paris	4	1			5	1	1			2	7	Switzerland
5	1901	(Switzerland) Lucerne	4	1			5	1	1			2	7	Switzerland
6	1902	(Italy) Rome	4	1			5	1	1			2	7	Switzerland
7	1903	(Argentina) Buenos Aires	4	1			5	1	1			2	7	Switzerland
8	1904	(France) Lyon (2)	4	1			5	1	1			2	7	Switzerland
9	1905	(Belgium) Brussels	4	1			5	1	1			2	7	Belgium
10	1906	(Italy) Milan	4	1			5	1	1			2	7	France
11	1907	(Switzerland) Zürich	4	1			5	1	1			2	7	Switzerland
12	1908	(Austria) Vienna	4	1			5	1	1			2	7	Italy
13	1909	(Germany) Hamburg	4	1			5	1	1			2	7	Switzerland
14	1910	(Netherlands) Loosduinen (2)	4	1			5	1	1			2	7	Switzerland
15	1911	(Italy) Rome (2)	8	1			9	1	1			2	11	Switzerland
16	1912	(France) Bayonne-Biarritz	8	1			9	1	1			2	11	Switzerland
17	1913	(United States) Camp Perry	8	1			9	1	1			2	11	Switzerland
18	1914	(Denmark) Viborg	8	1			9	1	1			2	11	France
19	1921	(France) Lyon (3)	8	1			9	1	1			2	11	United States
20	1922	(Italy) Milan (2)	8	1			9	1	1			2	11	Switzerland
21	1923	(United States) Camp Perry (2)	8	1			9	1	1			2	11	United States
22	1924	(France) Reims	8	1			9	1	1			2	11	United States
23	1925	(Switzerland) St. Gallen	8	1			9	1	1			2	11	Switzerland
24	1927	(Italy) Rome (3)	8	1			9	1	1			2	11	Switzerland
25	1928	(Netherlands) Loosduinen (3)	8	1			9	1	1			2	11	Switzerland
26	1929	(Sweden) Stockholm	9	1	1	2	13	3	1	1	2	7	20	Switzerland
27	1930	(Belgium) Antwerp	11	1			13	4	1			5	18	United States
27	1930	(Italy) Rome (4)			1		13					5	18	United States
28	1931	(Poland) Lwów	12	1	1	2	16	4	1	1	2	8	24	Switzerland
29	1933	(Spain) Granada	11	2			14	4	1			6	20	Sweden
29	1933	(Austria) Vienna (2)			1		14			1		6	20	Sweden
30	1935	(Italy) Rome (5)	11	2			14	5	1			7	21	Finland
30	1935	(Belgium) Brussels (2)			1		14			1		7	21	Finland
31	1937	(Finland) Helsinki	12	2	1	2	17	11	2	1		14	31	Finland
32	1939	(Switzerland) Lucerne (2)	13	2			16	5	2			8	24	Estonia
32	1939	(Germany) Berlin			1		16			1		8	24	Estonia

=== After World War II ===
Number	Year	Venue	Men's events					Women's events					Junior events					Team events					Total	Medal count winner
Number	Year	Venue	Ri	Pi	SG	RT	Σ	Ri	Pi	SG	RT	Σ	Ri	Pi	SG	RT	Σ	Ri	Pi	SG	RT	Σ	Total	Medal count winner
33	1947	(Sweden) Stockholm (2)	10	3	2	2	17											7	3	1		11	28	Sweden
34	1949	(Argentina) Buenos Aires (2)	11	3	1	3	18											5	3	1	1	10	28	Finland
35	1952	(Norway) Oslo	10	3	2	2	17											7	3	1	2	13	30	United States
36	1954	(Venezuela) Caracas	10	3	2	2	17											7	3	1	2	13	30	Soviet Union
37	1958	(Soviet Union) Moscow	11	3	2	2	18	2				2	1				1	10	3	2	2	17	38	Soviet Union
38	1962	(Egypt) Cairo	10	3	2	2	17	2	2	2		6						6	3	2	2	13	36	Soviet Union
39	1966	(West Germany) Wiesbaden	10	3	2	1	16	2	1	2		5						8	3	2	1	14	35	United States
40	1970	(United States) Phoenix	12	5	2	2	21	3	3	2		8						14	8	2	2	26	55	Soviet Union
41	1974	(Switzerland) Bern-Thun	11	5	2	2	20	3	2	2		7						14	6	2	2	24	51	Soviet Union
42	1978	(South Korea) Seoul	10	5	2	2	19	3	2	2		7						13	7	4	2	26	52	United States
43	1982	(Venezuela) Caracas (2)	10	5	2	3	20	3	2	2		7						13	7	4	3	27	54	Soviet Union
44	1986	(East Germany) Suhl	5	5	2	3	21	3	2	2		7						8	7	4	3	28	56	Soviet Union
44	1986	(Sweden) Skövde	6				21					7						6				28	56	Soviet Union
45	1990	(Soviet Union) Moscow (2)	10	5	3	3	21	3	2	3		8						13	7	6	3	29	58	Soviet Union
46	1994	(Italy) Milan-Tolmezzo-Fagnano (2)	6	5	3	4	18	3	2	3	1	9	6	7	3	5	21	15	14	6	8	43	91	United States
47	1998	(Spain) Barcelona-Zaragoza	6	5	3	2	16	3	2	3	1	9	6	7	3	3	19	15	14	6	6	41	85	China
48	2002	(Finland) Lahti	6	5	3	4	18	5	2	3	2	12	6	7	6	6	25	17	14	10	12	53	108	Russia
49	2006	(Croatia) Zagreb	6	5	3	4	18	5	2	3	2	12	6	7	5	6	24	17	14	8	12	51	105	China
50	2010	(Germany) Munich	6	5	3	4	18	5	2	3	2	12	6	7	5	6	24	17	14	10	12	53	107	China
51	2014	(Spain) Granada	6	5	3	4	18	5	2	2	2	11	6	7	5	6	24	17	14	10	8	49	102	China
52	2018	(South Korea) Changwon	6	5	3	4	18	5	2	2	2	11	6	7	4	4	21	19	16	6	11	52	102	China
53	2023	(Azerbaijan) Baku	8	5	2	2	17	8	4	2	2	16						12	8	6	2	28	58	China
54	2025	(Egypt) Cairo	5	5			10	5	5			10						9	9			18	38	China
55	2026	(Qatar) Doha																						

== Shotgun / running target championships ==
Special shotgun championships were first held in 1934, and since 1959 they are held biennially so that in these events, there are either Olympic Games or World Championships each year. The original event was trap; skeet was added in 1950 and double trap in 1989.

It was in this kind of championship that the first woman won a World Championship medal in shooting: Carola Mandel (USA) in 1950. Women got their own competitions in 1967.

Running target events have been sporadically included; the last time was 1983. As a compensation for the 2005 loss of Olympic status for 10 metre running target however, it has been decided to hold provisional World Championships in 10 metre running target and 50 metre running target in Olympic years, starting in 2008.

5 Edition (1961, 1967, 1973, 1975, 1983) of shotgun and running target was held simultaneously.

=== Shotgun ===
Number	Year	Venue	Men's events			Women's events			Junior events			Team events			Total	Medal count winner
Number	Year	Venue	SG	RT	Σ	SG	RT	Σ	SG	RT	Σ	SG	RT	Σ	Total	Medal count winner
1	1934	(Hungary) Budapest	1		1							1		1	2	Hungary
2	1936	(Germany) Berlin	1		1							1		1	2	Hungary
3	1938	(Czechoslovakia) Luhačovice	1		1							1		1	2	Hungary
4	1950	(Spain) Madrid	2		2										2	Italy
5	1959	(Egypt) Cairo	2		2							1		1	3	Italy and Soviet Union
6	1961*	(Norway) Oslo	2	2	4								2	2	6	United States
7	1965	Santiago de Chile	2		2										2	Chile
8	1967*	(Italy) Bologna	2	1	3	2		2				2	1	3	8	Soviet Union
9	1969	(Spain) San Sebastián	2		2	2		2				2		2	6	Italy
10	1971	(Italy) Bologna (2)	2		2	2		2				2		2	6	Soviet Union
11	1973*	(Australia) Melbourne	2	2	4							2	2	4	8	Soviet Union
12	1975*	(West Germany) Munich	2	1	3	2		2				4	1	5	10	Soviet Union
13	1977	(France) Antibes	2		2	2		2				4		4	8	Italy
14	1979	(Italy) Montecatini Terme	2		2	2		2				4		4	8	Soviet Union
15	1981	(Argentina) Tucumán	2		2	2		2				4		4	8	Soviet Union
16	1983*	(Canada) Edmonton	2	3	5	2		2				4	3	7	14	Soviet Union
17	1985	(Italy) Montecatini Terme (2)	2		2	2		2				4		4	8	China
18	1987	(Venezuela) Valencia	2		2	2		2				2		2	6	China
19	1989	(Italy) Montecatini Terme (3)	3		3	3		3	3		3	7		7	16	Italy
20	1991	(Australia) Perth	3		3	3		3	3		3	9		9	18	United States
21	1993	(Spain) Barcelona	3		3	2		2	3		3	8		8	16	Italy
22	1995	(Cyprus) Nicosia	3		3	3		3	3		3	9		9	18	Italy
23	1997	(Peru) Lima	3		3	3		3	3		3	8		8	17	Italy
24	1999	(Finland) Tampere	3		3	3		3	5		5	9		9	20	Italy
25	2001	(Egypt) Cairo (2)	3		3	3		3	6		6	9		9	21	United States
26	2003	(Cyprus) Nicosia (2)	3		3	3		3	6		6	11		11	23	United States
27	2005	(Italy) Lonato	3		3	3		3	5		5	8		8	19	Italy
28	2007	(Cyprus) Nicosia (3)	3		3	2		2	5		5	9		9	19	Italy
29	2009	(Slovenia) Maribor	3		3	2		2	5		5	10		10	20	Italy
30	2011	(Serbia) Belgrade	3		3	2		2	5		5	10		10	20	Russia
31	2013	(Peru) Lima (2)	3		3	2		2	5		5	10		10	20	Italy
32	2015	(Italy) Lonato (2)	3		3	2		2	5		5	10		10	20	Italy
33	2017	(Russia) Moscow	3		3	2		2	5		5	10		10	20	Italy
34	2019	(Italy) Lonato (3)	3		3	2		2	4		4	12		12	21	Italy
35	2022	(Croatia) Osijek	2		2	2		2	10		10	6		6	20	Italy

- shotgun and running target simultaneously

=== Running target ===
Number	Year	Venue	Men's events			Women's events			Junior events			Team events			Total	Medal count winner
Number	Year	Venue	SG	RT	Σ	SG	RT	Σ	SG	RT	Σ	SG	RT	Σ	Total	Medal count winner
1	1961*	(Norway) Oslo	2	2	4								2	2	6	United States
2	1967*	(Italy) Bologna	2	1	3	2		2				2	1	3	8	Soviet Union
3	1969	(Sweden) Sandviken		1	1								1	1	2	Soviet Union
4	1973*	(Australia) Melbourne	2	2	4							2	2	4	8	Soviet Union
5	1975*	(Germany) Munich	2	1	3	2		2				4	1	5	10	Soviet Union
6	1979	(Austria) Linz		2	2								2	2	4	Soviet Union
7	1981	(Sweden) Malå		2	2								2	2	4	Soviet Union
8	1983*	(Canada) Edmonton	2	3	5	2		2				4	3	7	14	Soviet Union
9	2008	(Czech Republic) Plzeň		4	4		2	2		6	6		10	10	22	Russia
10	2009	(Finland) Heinola		4	4		2	2		4	4		10	10	20	Russia
11	2012	(Sweden) Stockholm		4	4		2	2		6	6		12	12	24	Finland
12	2016	(Germany) Suhl		4	4		2	2		6	6		12	12	24	Ukraine
13	2022	(France) Châteauroux		4	4		2	2		6	6		2	2	14	Ukraine

- shotgun and running target simultaneously

== Airgun championships ==
From 1979 to 1991, there were seven special airgun championships, including 10 metre air rifle, 10 metre air pistol and sometimes also 10 metre running target. This kind of championship has been discontinued.

Number	Year	Venue	Men's events				Women's events				Junior events				Team events				Total	Medal count winner
Number	Year	Venue	Ri	Pi	RT	Σ	Ri	Pi	RT	Σ	Ri	Pi	RT	Σ	Ri	Pi	RT	Σ	Total	Medal count winner
1	1979	(South Korea) Seoul	1	1		2	1	1		2					2	2		4	8	United States
2	1981	(Dominican Republic) Santo Domingo	1	1	1	3	1	1		2					2	2	1	5	10	Soviet Union
3	1983	(Austria) Innsbruck	1	1		2	1	1		2					2	2		4	8	Sweden
4	1985	Mexico City	1	1		2	1	1		2					2	2		4	8	Soviet Union
5	1987	(Hungary) Budapest	1	1	1	3	1	1		2					2	2	1	5	10	Soviet Union
6	1989	(Socialist Federal Republic of Yugoslavia) Sarajevo	1	1	1	3	1	1		2	2	2	1	5	4	4	2	10	20	Soviet Union
7	1991	(Norway) Stavanger	1	1	1	3	1	1		2	2	2	1	5	4	4	2	10	20	Soviet Union

== Rifle / Pistol World championships ==
In 2022, ISSF organized the first Rifle/Pistol World Championships, separate from the Shotgun and Running target events.

Number	Year	Venue	Men's events			Women's events			Mixed events			Junior events			Total	Medal count winner
Number	Year	Venue	Ri	Pi	Σ	Ri	Pi	Σ	Ri	Pi	Σ	Ri	Pi	Σ	Total	Medal count winner
1	2022	(Egypt) Cairo	9	7	16	9	6	15	5	4	9	15	15	30	70	China
2	2025	(Egypt) Cairo														

== Junior championships ==
Number	Year	Place	Top-ranked nation
1	2017	Moscow (RUS)	China
2	2021	Lima (PER)	India
3	2023	Changwon (KOR)	China

== Target Sprint ==
- 2017 World Target Sprint Championships

== Current individual events ==
- 300 meter rifle three positions
- 300 meter rifle prone
- 300 meter standard rifle
- 50 meter rifle three positions
- 50 meter rifle prone
- 10 meter air rifle
- 50 meter pistol
- 25 meter pistol
- 25 meter standard pistol
- 25 meter rapid fire pistol
- 25 meter center-fire pistol
- 10 meter air pistol
- 50 meter running target
- 50 meter running target mixed
- 10 meter running target
- 10 meter running target mixed
- Trap
- Double trap
- Skeet

=== Total medals by country (senior current events only) ===
This table was calculated for the senior current events only. Last updated after 2009 World Running Target Championships.

Rank	Nation	Gold	Silver	Bronze	Total
1	Soviet Union	207	128	87	422
2	United States	130	142	119	391
3	Italy	89	71	76	236
4	Switzerland	85	67	53	205
5	China	81	77	52	210
6	Russia	49	40	41	130
7	Sweden	40	52	62	154
8	Finland	37	45	51	133
9	France	33	55	61	149
10	Hungary	31	35	45	111
11	Germany	28	28	36	92
12	West Germany	27	27	32	86
13	Norway	17	19	28	64
14	Belgium	17	12	17	46
15	Czech Republic	15	23	9	47
16	Poland	15	18	14	47
17	Czechoslovakia	14	16	17	47
18	East Germany	13	19	24	56
19	Ukraine	13	17	22	52
20	India	13	12	15	40
21	Bulgaria	13	11	11	35
22	Australia	12	20	10	42
23	Canada	9	10	4	23
24	South Korea	9	9	20	38
25	Denmark	9	6	19	34
26	Argentina	9	4	6	19
27	Great Britain	8	14	21	43
28	Spain	8	14	17	39
29	Yugoslavia	7	12	4	23
30	Kuwait	6	1	4	11
31	Estonia	5	2	3	10
32	Belarus	4	7	8	19
33	Kazakhstan	4	1	4	9
34	Romania	3	11	10	24
35	Austria	3	7	14	24
36	Mexico	3	2	3	8
37	Cyprus	3	2	0	5
38	Slovakia	2	7	12	21
39	Azerbaijan	2	3	0	5
40	Venezuela	2	2	2	6
41	Colombia	2	1	4	7
42	Chile	2	1	0	3
43	Portugal	1	6	3	10
44	Egypt	1	2	5	8
45	Chinese Taipei	1	1	2	4
45	Slovenia	1	1	2	4
47	Ireland	1	1	1	3
48	Israel	1	1	0	2
48	South Africa	1	1	0	2
48	United Arab Emirates	1	1	0	2
51	Mongolia	1	0	2	3
52	Armenia	1	0	0	1
52	Latvia	1	0	0	1
54	Japan	0	5	3	8
55	Netherlands	0	4	6	10
56	Lithuania	0	4	1	5
57	Cuba	0	3	5	8
58	Greece	0	2	1	3
58	Thailand	0	2	1	3
60	Brazil	0	1	2	3
60	North Korea	0	1	2	3
62	Georgia	0	1	1	2
62	Turkey	0	1	1	2
64	Lebanon	0	1	0	1
64	Serbia and Montenegro	0	1	0	1
66	San Marino	0	0	3	3
67	Albania	0	0	1	1
67	Croatia	0	0	1	1
67	Peru	0	0	1	1
67	Puerto Rico	0	0	1	1
67	Uruguay	0	0	1	1
Totals (71 entries)		1,090	1,090	1,083	3,263

== Medals ==
=== Nations ===
This table was calculated for the senior events only, including both current and discontinued events. Last updated after 2019 World Shotgun Championships.

Rank	Nation	Gold	Silver	Bronze	Total
1	Soviet Union	257	162	106	525
2	United States	208	191	181	580
3	Switzerland	175	150	131	456
4	Italy	128	103	105	336
5	China	117	111	71	299
6	Russia	86	79	75	240
7	Sweden	84	113	119	316
8	Finland	75	93	94	262
9	France	64	94	106	264
10	Germany	51	49	43	143
11	Norway	45	59	64	168
12	Hungary	36	42	54	132
13	West Germany	32	30	40	102
14	Poland	26	26	19	71
15	Great Britain	24	19	37	80
16	Belgium	23	17	30	70
17	South Korea	23	0	0	23
18	Estonia	20	12	16	48
19	Czech Republic	19	28	21	68
20	Ukraine	18	25	41	84
21	Denmark	18	24	28	70
22	Spain	18	20	24	62
23	Australia	17	22	12	51
24	Czechoslovakia	16	23	25	64
25	Argentina	16	7	10	33
26	East Germany	14	22	31	67
27	India	13	12	15	40
28	Bulgaria	13	12	11	36
29	Canada	11	13	5	29
30	Slovakia	7	13	21	41
31	Kuwait	7	3	9	19
32	Austria	6	12	16	34
33	Yugoslavia	6	11	5	22
34	Belarus	5	8	14	27
35	Netherlands	4	12	14	30
36	Romania	4	12	11	27
37	Cyprus	4	3	4	11
38	Kazakhstan	4	1	6	11
39	North Korea	3	6	9	18
40	Mexico	3	2	3	8
41	Serbia	2	7	4	13
42	Japan	2	6	3	11
43	Azerbaijan	2	3	0	5
44	Brazil	2	2	4	8
45	Slovenia	2	2	3	7
46	South Africa	2	2	2	6
46	Turkey	2	2	2	6
46	Venezuela	2	2	2	6
49	Colombia	2	1	4	7
50	Chile	2	1	0	3
51	Portugal	1	8	3	12
52	Egypt	1	2	6	9
53	Greece	1	2	1	4
54	Chinese Taipei	1	1	3	5
55	Mongolia	1	1	2	4
56	Ireland	1	1	1	3
56	United Arab Emirates	1	1	1	3
58	?IOP?	1	1	0	2
58	Israel	1	1	0	2
58	Latvia	1	1	0	2
61	Croatia	0	4	5	9
62	Lithuania	0	4	1	5
63	Cuba	0	3	5	8
64	Georgia	0	2	1	3
64	Thailand	0	2	1	3
66	Lebanon	0	1	0	1
66	Serbia and Montenegro	0	1	0	1
68	San Marino	0	0	6	6
69	Albania	0	0	1	1
69	Guatemala	0	0	1	1
69	Peru	0	0	1	1
69	Puerto Rico	0	0	1	1
69	Uruguay	0	0	1	1
Totals (73 entries)		1,730	1,705	1,691	5,126

=== Individual ===
In this list the multiple medalists (only individual) of all-time who won at least 7 gold medals.

Still active

#	Name	Nation	Years	Gold medal	Silver medal	Bronze medal	Total	Discipline
1	Konrad Staeheli	Switzerland	1898-1914	22	13	9	44	Pistol/Rifle
2	Karl Zimmermann	Switzerland	1921-1947	19	9	13	41	Rifle
3	Josias Hartmann	Switzerland	1921-1933	8	8	10	26	Rifle
4	Emil Kellenberger	Switzerland	1899-1922	8	7	0	15	Rifle
5	Łukasz Czapla	Poland	2006-2018	8	3	0	11	Running target
6	Torsten Ullman	Sweden	1933-1954	8	2	0	10	Pistol
7	Paul Van Asbroeck	Belgium	1900-1925	7	5	8	20	Pistol/Rifle
8	Emil Martinsson	Sweden	2002-2018	7	5	3	15	Running target
9	Walter Stokes	United States	1921-1924	7	5	1	13	Rifle
10	Gary Anderson	United States	1962-1966	7	2	1	10	Rifle

=== Individual and team ===
In this list the multiple medalists (individual and team) of all-time.

#	Name	Nation	Years	Gold medal	Silver medal	Bronze medal	Total	Discipline
1	Konrad Staeheli	Switzerland	1898-1914	41	17	11	69	Pistol/Rifle
2	Karl Zimmermann	Switzerland	1921-1947	30	17	20	67	Rifle
3	Lones Wigger	United States	1966-1986	22	22	7	51	Rifle
4	Kullervo Leskinen	Finland	1930-1952	15	19	11	45	Rifle
5	Josias Hartmann	Switzerland	1921-1939	15	12	11	38	Rifle
6	Wilhelm Schnyder	Switzerland	1922-1933	14	2	3	19	Pistol/Rifle
7	John Robert Foster	United States	1961-1974	13	15	2	30	Rifle/Running Deer
8	Paul Van Asbroeck	Belgium	1900-1930	13	9	13	35	Pistol/Rifle
9	Emil Kellenberger	Switzerland	1899-1922	13	7	0	20	Rifle
10	Gennadi Lushikov	Soviet Union	1974-1990	13	6	2	21	Rifle
11	Lubos Racansky	Czech Republic	1986-2008	13	5	1	19	Running Target
12	Louis Richardet	Switzerland	1897-1909	13	4	5	22	Pistol/Rifle
13	Moysey Itkis	Soviet Union	1954-1962	13	1	5	19	Rifle
14	Walter Lienhard	Switzerland	1922-1939	12	11	3	26	Rifle
15	Otto Horber	Switzerland	1935-1952	12	9	12	33	Rifle

== See also ==
- Shooting at the Summer Olympics
- ISSF World Cup
- ISSF Junior World Cup
- European Shooting Championships
- Asian Shooting Championships
- 1973 American Shooting Championships
