= Huthart =

Huthart is a surname. Notable people with the surname include:

- Eunice Huthart (born 1966), English stunt performer
- Victor Huthart (1924–1997), British sport shooter

== See also ==
- Hughart
