= KKL =

KKL may stand for:

- Leibstadt Nuclear Power Plant (German: Kernkraftwerk Leibstadt)
- Kuapa Kokoo Limited
- Keren Kayemet LeYisrael, the Hebrew name for the Jewish National Fund
- Kampala Kids League (Uganda)
- Kultur- und Kongresszentrum Luzern, the German name for the Culture and Convention Centre in Lucerne
- KKL, the old name of Film & Kino
- Khuda Kay Liye, Pakistani movie
- Kinmen Kaoliang Liquor, a company in Kinmen, Taiwan
- KKL or JNF-KKL, the Jewish National Fund (Israel)
