= Assmus =

Assmus or Aßmus is a German surname. Notable people with the surname include:

- Bernhardt Assmus (c. 1855–u?), German stamp forger
- Eric Assmus (died 1937–1939), Russian ambassador
- Gerhard Aßmus (born 1928), German sports shooter
