= 1969 World Running Target Championships =

- Host city: Sandviken, Sweden
- Level: Senior
- Events: 2 men (1 individual + 1 team)

The 1969 World Running Target Championships were separate ISSF World Shooting Championships for the 100 metre running deer event held in Sandviken, Sweden. The competition was also valid as a 1969 European Running Target Championships, in which the rankings of the races played with all world athletes were drawn up taking into account only European athletes.

== 50 m running target ==
Individual

#	Athlete	Score
1st place, gold medalist(s)	Martin Nordfors (SWE)	252
2nd place, silver medalist(s)	Valeri Postoyanov (URS)	251
3rd place, bronze medalist(s)	John Kingeter (USA)	250

Team

#	Country	Score
1st place, gold medalist(s)	Soviet Union	654
2nd place, silver medalist(s)	United States	638
3rd place, bronze medalist(s)	Sweden	632

== Medal count ==
* Host nation (Sweden)

Rank	Nation	Gold	Silver	Bronze	Total
1	Soviet Union (URS)	1	1	0	2
2	Sweden (SWE)*	1	0	1	2
3	United States (USA)	0	1	1	2
Totals (3 entries)		2	2	2	6

== See also ==
- 1969 World Shotgun Championships
