= 1969 European Running Target Championships =

- Host city: Sandviken, Sweden
- Level: Senior
- Events: 2 men (1 individual + 1 team)

The 1969 European Running Target Championships was the 2nd edition of the running target competition, European Running Target Championships, organised by the International Shooting Sport Federation.

The competition was also valid as a 1969 World Running Target Championships, in which the rankings of the races played with all world athletes were drawn up taking into account only European athletes.

== Results ==
=== Men ===
Event	Gold		Silver		Bronze	
Event	Athletes	Pts	Athletes	Pts	Athletes	Pts
50 m running target	(Sweden) Martin Nordfors	252	(Soviet Union) Valery Postoyanov	251	(Soviet Union) Valery Staratelev	249
50 m running target, team	Soviet Union; Andris Buzis; Igor Nikiforov; Valery Postoyanov; Valery Staratelev		Sweden; Göte Gåård; Runnar Jacobsson; Stig Johansson; Martin Nordfors		West Germany; Friedrich Christoffer; Gunther Danne; Herwald Tiedge; Gert Witting	

== Medal table ==
Host country

#	Country	1st place, gold medalist(s)	2nd place, silver medalist(s)	3rd place, bronze medalist(s)	Tot.
1	Soviet Union	1	1	1	3
2	Sweden	1	1	0	2
3	West Germany	0	0	1	1
Total		2	2	2	6

== See also ==
- 1969 World Running Target Championships
- European Shooting Confederation
- International Shooting Sport Federation
- List of medalists at the European Shooting Championships
- List of medalists at the European Shotgun Championships
