= Matsu Distillery =

Distillery in Nangan, Lienchiang, Taiwan

Matsu Distillery 馬祖酒廠
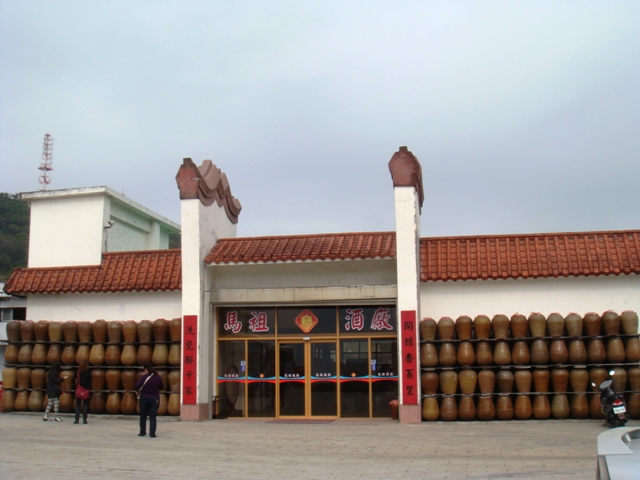
- Location: Nangan, Lienchiang, Taiwan
- Coordinates: 26°09′40″N 119°57′06″E
- Founded: 1956

Kaoliang Liquor
- Type: liquor

The Matsu Distillery (traditional Chinese: 馬祖酒廠; simplified Chinese: 马祖酒厂; pinyin: Mǎzǔ Jiǔchǎng) is a distillery in Niujiao Village, Nangan Township, Lienchiang County, Taiwan.

== History ==
The distillery was originally established in 1956 as Zhongxing Distillery. In 1969, it was renamed to Matsu Distillery. In 1992, the distillery acquired Tunnel 88 from Chunghwa Telecom.

== Architecture ==
The distillery consists of the main distillery building and the Tunnel 88 for storage, which is located 150 meters away from the main distillery building.

== Exhibition ==
The distillery features an exhibition room which exhibits several different Kaoliang liquors from different period, discontinued medical liquors. It also features tools and production processes for the production of the liquors, as well as the selling for various liquors.

== See also ==
- Kinmen Kaoliang Liquor
