= Georgitsis =

Georgitsis is a surname. Notable people with the surname include:

- Phaedon Georgitsis (1939–2019), Greek actor
- Platon Georgitsis, Greek sports shooter in the 1960 Olympics
