= Galliano Rossini =

Italian sports shooter

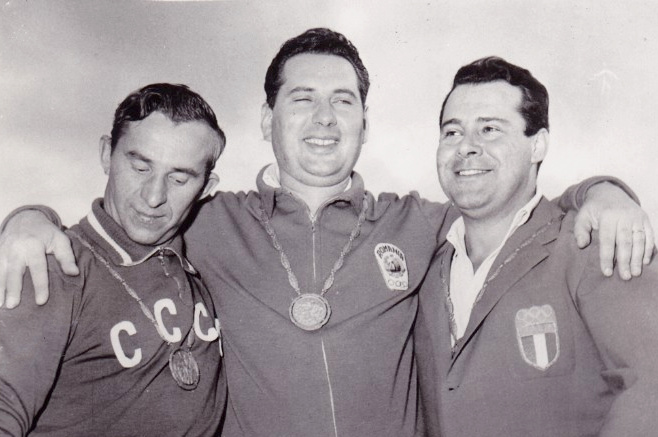
- Sergei Kalinin, Ion Dumitrescu and Galliano Rossini (right) at the 1960 Olympics

Personal information
- Born: 17 May 1927 Torrette, Italy
- Died: 13 November 1987 (aged 60) Torrette, Italy
- Height: 1.72 m (5 ft 8 in)
- Weight: 87 kg (192 lb)

Sport
- Sport: Shooting
- Club: Piattellisti A. Archibugi Torrette
Medal record
Representing Italy
Gold medal – first place	1956 Melbourne	Trap individual
Silver medal – second place	1960 Rome	Trap individual
World Championships
Gold medal – first place	1954 Caracas	Trap team
Gold medal – first place	1959 Cairo	Trap team
Silver medal – second place	1954 Caracas	Trap individual
Silver medal – second place	1958 Moscow	Trap team
Silver medal – second place	1958 Moscow	Trap individual
Bronze medal – third place	1959 Cairo	Trap individual

Galliano Rossini (17 May 1927 – 13 November 1987) was an Italian sports shooter. He competed at the 1952, 1956, 1960, 1964 and 1968 Olympics in the trap event and finished in 7th, 1st, 2nd, 4th and 13th place, respectively. He also won six medals in the trap at the world championships of 1954–1959.
