= Hughart =

Hughart is a surname. Notable people with the surname include:

- Barry Hughart (1934–2019), American fantasy novelist
- Jim Hughart (born 1936), American jazz and pop bass player
- Ron Hughart (born 1961), American animation director
- Veronica Hughart (1907–1977), American artist, architectural designer and journalist

== See also ==
- Hughart, West Virginia
