= Sergei Kalinin (sport shooter) =

Russian sport shooter (1926–1997)

Sergei Alekseyevich Kalinin
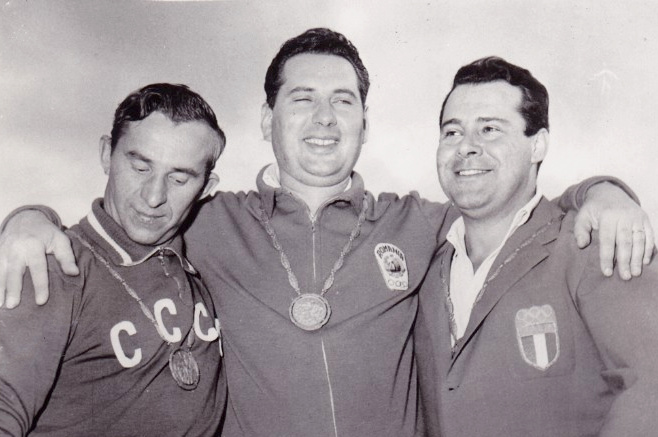
- Sergei Kalinin, Ion Dumitrescu and Galliano Rossini at the 1960 Olympics

Personal information
- Born: 23 December 1926 Yaroslavl, USSR
- Died: 17 October 1997 (aged 70)
- Height: 1.70 m (5 ft 7 in)
- Weight: 80 kg (180 lb)

Sport
- Sport: Shooting
- Club: Soviet Army, St. Petersburg
Medal record
Representing the Soviet Union
Bronze medal – third place	1960 Rome	Trap individual
World Championships
Gold medal – first place	1958 Moscow	Trap team
Gold medal – first place	1962 Cairo	Trap team

Sergei Alekseyevich Kalinin (Russian: Сергей Алексеевич Калинин, 23 December 1926 – 17 October 1997) was a Soviet sports shooter. He competed at the 1960 and 1964 Olympics in the individual trap event and finished in 3rd and 22nd place, respectively.

== Biography ==
Kalinin was born to a hunter and started shooting aged seven. Between 1943 and 1945 he fought in World War II, and after that started training in sports shooting. He won two world titles with the Soviet team, in 1958 and 1962.

== Awards ==
- Medal "For Labour Valour" (1960)
