= Francis Bonafede =

Monegasque sport shooter (born 1939)

Personal information
- Born: 14 July 1939 (age 86) Monaco

Sport
- Sport: Sports shooting

Francis Bonafede (born 14 July 1939) is a Monegasque sport shooter. He competed in the trap event at the 1960 Summer Olympics.
