= Gilbert Henderson =

Canadian sports shooter

Personal information
- Born: 5 September 1926 Toronto, Canada
- Died: 30 January 2017 (aged 90) Brantford, Canada

Sport
- Sport: Sports shooting

Gilbert J. Henderson (5 September 1926 – 30 January 2017) was a Canadian sports shooter. He competed in the trap event at the 1960 Summer Olympics.
