= Wim Peeters =

South African sports shooter

Personal information
- Born: 22 August 1925 Johannesburg, South Africa
- Died: 15 August 2011 (aged 85) Bloemfontein, South Africa

Sport
- Sport: Sports shooting

Wim Peeters (22 August 1925 – 15 August 2011) was a South African sports shooter. He competed in the trap event at the 1960 Summer Olympics.
