= Louis von Sonnenberg =

Swiss sports shooter

Personal information
- Born: 19 May 1921 Alberswil, Switzerland
- Died: 17 February 2004 (aged 82)

Sport
- Sport: Sports shooting

Louis von Sonnenberg (19 May 1921 – 17 February 2004) was a Swiss sports shooter. He competed in the trap event at the 1960 Summer Olympics.
