= 1961 World Shotgun and Running Target Championships =

Shotgun and Running Target Championships

The 1961 World Shotgun and Running Target Championships were held in Oslo, Norway. While separate world championships in the shotgun events had become traditional, this was the first time the competition also included the 100 metre running deer events. These had been Norwegian specialties but were now dominated by the superpowers, leaving the host country without medals.

== Medal count ==
* Host nation (Norway)

Rank	Nation	Gold	Silver	Bronze	Total
1	United States (USA)	2	3	0	5
2	Soviet Union (URS)	2	2	3	7
3	Italy (ITA)	1	0	0	1
3	Venezuela (VEN)	1	0	0	1
5	Canada (CAN)	0	1	0	1
6	Sweden (SWE)	0	0	2	2
7	Romania (ROM)	0	0	1	1
Totals (7 entries)		6	6	6	18

== Results ==
=== Shotgun events ===
Individual
Trap
Gold	Ennio Mattarelli (ITA)	296
Silver	Francis Eisenlauer (USA)	296
Bronze	Ion Dumitrescu (ROU)	295
Skeet
Gold	Carlos Plaza Marques (VEN)	199
Silver	Bernard Hartman (CAN)	198
Bronze	Arkagiy Kaplun (URS)	197

=== Running target events ===
Individual			Team		
100 metre running deer, single shot
Gold	Loyd Crow (USA)	226	Gold	Soviet Union	879
Silver	Vitaly Romanenko (URS)	222	Silver	United States	877
Bronze	Ludwig Lustberg (URS)	221	Bronze	Sweden	812
100 metre running deer, double shot
Gold	John Foster (USA)	222	Gold	Soviet Union	861
Silver	Vladimir Linnikov (URS)	219	Silver	United States	833
Bronze	Ludwig Lustberg (URS)	219	Bronze	Sweden	812
