= Wang Ching-rui =

Taiwanese sports shooter

Personal information
- Born: 16 February 1922 Changhua, Japanese Taiwan

Sport
- Sport: Sports shooting

Wang Ching-rui (born 16 February 1922) is a Taiwanese former sports shooter. He competed in the trap event at the 1960 Summer Olympics.
