= Juan Malo =

Spanish sports shooter

Personal information
- Born: 11 February 1922 Graus, Spain
- Died: 8 October 2005 (aged 83)

Sport
- Sport: Sports shooting

Juan Malo (11 February 1922 – 8 October 2005) was a Spanish sports shooter. He competed in the trap event at the 1960 Summer Olympics.
