= 1903 ISSF World Shooting Championships =

International sport shooting competition

The 7th UIT World Shooting Championships was the contemporary name of the ISSF World Shooting Championships held in Buenos Aires, Argentina, in 1903. The winners were Emil Kellenberger in the rifle competition and Benjamin Segura in the pistol competition.

== Results ==
=== 300 metre rifle three position ===
Gold	Silver	Bronze
Emil Kellenberger (SUI)	Louis Richardet (SUI)	Attilio Conti (ITA)

=== 50 metre pistol ===
Gold	Silver	Bronze
Benjamin Segura (ARG)	Cesare Valerio (ITA)	Marcelo Torcuato de Alvear (ARG)
