= Rune Andersson (sport shooter) =

Swedish sports shooter

Personal information
- Born: 28 April 1919 Västra Götaland, Sweden
- Died: 27 August 1992 (aged 73) Vedum, Sweden

Sport
- Sport: Sports shooting

Rune Andersson (28 April 1919 – 27 August 1992) was a Swedish sports shooter. He competed in the trap event at the 1960 Summer Olympics.
