= Keshav Sen =

Indian sports shooter

Personal information
- Born: 21 September 1923 Kharwa, India

Sport
- Sport: Sports shooting

Keshav Sen (born 21 September 1923) is an Indian former sports shooter. He competed in the trap event at the 1960 Summer Olympics.
