= Carl Beck-Friis =

Swedish sports shooter

Personal information
- Born: 5 December 1921 Stockholm, Sweden
- Died: 12 March 2005 (aged 83) Hargshamn, Sweden

Sport
- Sport: Sports shooting

Carl Beck-Friis (5 December 1921 – 12 March 2005) was a Swedish sports shooter. He competed in the trap event at the 1960 Summer Olympics.
