= Bram Zanella =

Venezuelan sports shooter (born 1918)

Personal information
- Full name: Abraham Zanella Sticotti
- Born: 27 September 1918 Amaro, Kingdom of Italy

Sport
- Sport: Sports shooting

Bram Zanella (born 27 September 1918, date of death unknown) was a Venezuelan sports shooter. He competed in the trap event at the 1960 Summer Olympics. Zanella is deceased.
