= Franz Sarnitz =

Austrian sports shooter

Personal information
- Born: 14 April 1919 Vienna, Austria
- Died: 8 December 1992 (aged 73)

Sport
- Sport: Sports shooting

Franz Sarnitz (14 April 1919 – 8 December 1992) was an Austrian sports shooter. He competed in the trap event at the 1960 Summer Olympics.
