= Kenichi Kumagai =

Japanese sport shooter

Personal information
- Born: 17 March 1927 Aichi, Japan

Sport
- Sport: Sports shooting

Kenichi Kumagai (born 17 March 1927) is a Japanese former sports shooter. He competed in the trap event at the 1960 Summer Olympics.
