= James Clark (sport shooter) =

American sports shooter

Personal information
- Born: January 8, 1936 (age 90) Borger, Texas, United States

Sport
- Sport: Sports shooting

James Clark (born January 8, 1936) is an American former sports shooter. He competed in the trap event at the 1960 Summer Olympics.
