= Sim Myeong-hui =

South Korean sport shooter

Personal information
- Born: 12 October 1925 Seoul, South Korea

Korean name
- Hangul: 심명희
- Hanja: 沈明熙
- RR: Sim Myeonghui
- MR: Sim Myŏnghŭi

Sport
- Sport: Sports shooting

Sim Myeong-hui (Korean: 심명희; born 12 October 1925) is a South Korean former sports shooter. He competed in the trap event at the 1960 Summer Olympics.

The Korean Sport & Olympic Committee initially chose Sim to represent the country in the trap event at the 1956 Summer Olympics, but in the end he did not participate. He worked for Daidong Transport, (Note: 대동운수; 大東運輸; Daedong Unsu) and represented the company at South Korea's Workplace Defense Shooting Championships (Note: 직장대항사격대회; 職場對抗射擊大會; Jikjang Daehang Sagyeok Daehoe) in 1959, coming in first place in first place in the individual division. At the 1960 Summer Olympics, he did not progress to the finals. In 1965 when the Korean Shooting Association (Note: 한국사격협회; 韓國射擊協會; Hanguk Sagyeok Hyeophoe) split off separate associations for rifle and trap shooting, he became a member of the board of directors of the trap shooting association.

Sim also enjoyed fishing and cooking. He was one of the founding members of the Gwangju Central Fishing Association (Note: 광주중앙낚시회; 廣州中央낚시會; Gwangju Jungang Naksihoe) in 1967, and became its first vice-president.
