= Heinz Kramer =

German sports shooter

Personal information
- Full name: Karl Heinz Kramer
- Born: 21 December 1925 Binz, Germany
- Died: 23 March 1965 (aged 39) Binz, East Germany

Sport
- Sport: Sports shooting
- Event: Trap shooting

Karl Heinz Kramer (21 December 1925 – 23 March 1965) was a German sports shooter. He competed in the trap shooting at the 1960 Summer Olympics.

== Olympic Games ==
1960 Summer Olympics in Rome, competing for the United Team of Germany:

- Shooting – Men's trap – 22nd place (tie)
