= Shooting at the 1960 Summer Olympics – Men's trap =

Men's trap at the Games of the XVII Olympiad
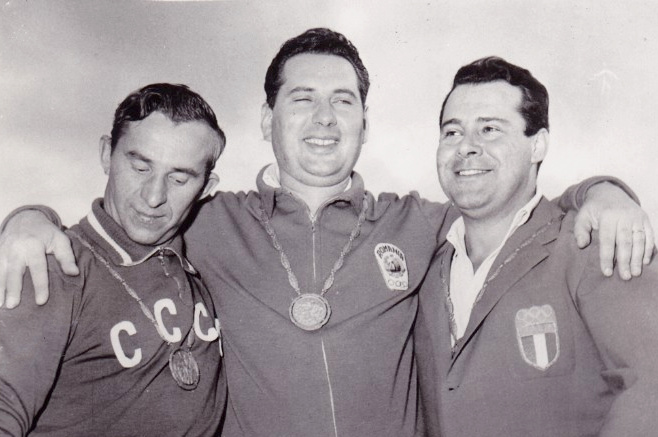
- Sergei Kalinin, Ion Dumitrescu, and Galliano Rossini
- Venue: Rome, Italy
- Dates: 5–9 September 1960
- Competitors: 66 from 38 nations
- Winning score: 192

Medalists
1st place, gold medalist(s)		Ion Dumitrescu	Romania
2nd place, silver medalist(s)		Galliano Rossini	Italy
3rd place, bronze medalist(s)		Sergei Kalinin	Soviet Union

The men's trap was a shooting sports event held as part of the Shooting at the 1960 Summer Olympics programme. It was the eighth appearance of the event. The competition was held from 5 to 9 September 1960 at the shooting ranges in Rome. 66 shooters from 38 nations competed. Each nation could send up to two shooters. The event was won by Ion Dumitrescu of Romania, the nation's first medal in the men's trap. The defending champion, Galliano Rossini of Italy, took silver this time to become the first person to earn multiple medals in the trap competition. Soviet shooter Sergei Kalinin received bronze.

== Background ==
This was the eighth appearance of the men's ISSF Olympic trap event. The event was held at every Summer Olympics from 1896 to 1924 (except 1904, when no shooting events were held) and from 1952 to 2016. As with most shooting events, it was nominally open to women from 1968 to 1980; the trap remained open to women through 1992. Very few women participated these years. The event returned to being men-only for 1996, though the new double trap had separate events for men and women that year. In 2000, a separate women's event was added and it has been contested at every Games since. There was also a men's team trap event held four times from 1908 to 1924.

Three of the top 10 shooters from the 1956 Games returned: gold medalist Galliano Rossini of Italy, silver medalist Adam Smelczyński of Poland, and fifth-place finisher Yury Nikandrov of the Soviet Union. Since winning the Olympic gold in 1956, Rossini had reached the podium at both of the intervening World Championships: silver in 1958 and bronze in 1959. His teammate in Rome, Edoardo Casciano, had also taken medals at both Worlds (bronze in 1958, silver in 1959). The reigning World Champion, Hussam El-Badrawi of Egypt (now competing for the United Arab Republic) was also competing in 1960.

Chile, the Republic of China, India, Lebanon, Luxembourg, Malta, Peru, Portugal, San Marino, South Africa, South Korea, the United Arab Republic, and Zimbabwe each made their debut in the event; East and West Germany competed together as the United Team of Germany for the first time. Great Britain made its eighth appearance, the only nation to have competed at each edition of the event to that point.

== Competition format ==
The competition used the 200-target format introduced with the return of trap to the Olympics in 1952. The 1960 event, with a much larger field than in 1952 and 1956, added a 100-target preliminary round. The top 36 shooters advanced from the 100-target preliminary round to shoot the 200-target final round. The qualification round was shot in 2 series of 50 shots; the final round was shot in 8 series of 25 shots. Scores were reset between rounds (only the final round counted for those qualifying).

== Records ==
Prior to this competition, the existing world and Olympic records were as follows.

World record				
Olympic record	Galliano Rossini (ITA)	195	Melbourne, Australia	29 November – 1 December 1956

No new world or Olympic records were set during the competition.

== Schedule ==
Date	Time	Round
Monday, 5 September 1960; Tuesday, 6 September 1960	9:00	Qualification round
Thursday, 8 September 1960; Friday, 9 September 1960	9:00	Final round

== Results ==
Andersson and Nikandrov had the best scores of the qualifying round, hitting 97 of 100 targets. The cut-off for the final round turned out to be 85 hits. Scores of those shooters not advancing are not known.

The Soviets, Kalinin and Nikandrov, hit all 25 targets in the first series of the final. Kalinin kept up the pace, perfect in the 2nd and 4th series as well on his way to a 99 of 100 score to lead the first half. Rossini, the defending champion, was close behind at 98. The second half of the final did not go as well for the leaders, with Rossini hitting only 93 (191 total) and Kalinin 91 (190 total). Those scores were enough to keep them on the podium, however, though not enough to win: Dumitrescu's 98 in the second half put him over the top at 192 total.

Rank	Shooter	Nation	Qualification	Final
1st place, gold medalist(s)	Ion Dumitrescu	Romania	92	192
2nd place, silver medalist(s)	Galliano Rossini	Italy	89	191
3rd place, bronze medalist(s)	Sergei Kalinin	Soviet Union	89	190
4	James Clark	United States	90	188
5	Hans Aasnæs	Norway	87	185
5	Joe Wheater	Great Britain	93	185
7	Adam Smelczyński	Poland	88	184
8	Claude Foussier	France	90	183
8	Karni Singh	India	89	183
10	Elias Salhab	Lebanon	89	182
10	Laszlo Szapáry	Austria	89	182
12	Rune Andersson	Sweden	97	181
12	Hussam El-Badrawi	United Arab Republic	94	181
12	Victor Huthart	Great Britain	86	181
15	Guy de Valle Flor	Portugal	85	180
15	Yury Nikandrov	Soviet Union	97	180
17	Juan Enrique Lira	Chile	93	179
17	Gerhard Aßmus	United Team of Germany	89	179
19	Ede Szomjas	Hungary	93	178
19	Platon Georgitsis	Greece	89	178
19	Kenichi Kumagai	Japan	85	178
22	Bram Zanella	Venezuela	93	177
22	Heinz Kramer	United Team of Germany	88	177
24	Leo Franciosi	San Marino	93	176
24	Maurice Tabet	Lebanon	94	176
26	Gilberto Navarro	Chile	85	174
27	Pierre-André Flückiger	Switzerland	95	173
28	Franz Sarnitz	Austria	86	172
29	Josef Hrach	Czechoslovakia	92	170
30	Arnold Riegger	United States	87	168
31	Károly Kulin-Nagy	Hungary	85	167
32	Juan Malo	Spain	90	166
32	Václav Zavázal	Czechoslovakia	87	166
34	Edoardo Casciano	Italy	92	165
35	Wim Peeters	South Africa	87	162
36	Enrique Dibos	Peru	88	155
37–66	Marcel Chennaux	Luxembourg	Unknown	Did not advance
37–66	Enrique Beech	Philippines	Unknown	Did not advance
37–66	Gheorghe Enache	Romania	Unknown	Did not advance
37–66	Gilbert Henderson	Canada	Unknown	Did not advance
37–66	Väinö Broman	Finland	Unknown	Did not advance
37–66	Hassan Moaffi	United Arab Republic	Unknown	Did not advance
37–66	Wenzu Vella	Malta	Unknown	Did not advance
37–66	Sen Keshav	India	Unknown	Did not advance
37–66	Louis von Sonnenberg	Switzerland	Unknown	Did not advance
37–66	Sim Myeong-hui	South Korea	Unknown	Did not advance
37–66	Georgios Pangalos	Greece	Unknown	Did not advance
37–66	Eduard de Atzel	Peru	Unknown	Did not advance
37–66	Wang Ching-rui	Formosa	Unknown	Did not advance
37–66	Mitsuo Yamane	Japan	Unknown	Did not advance
37–66	Bill Gulliver	Zimbabwe	Unknown	Did not advance
37–66	Francis Bonafede	Monaco	Unknown	Did not advance
37–66	Guglielmo Giusti	San Marino	Unknown	Did not advance
37–66	Juan Gindre	Argentina	Unknown	Did not advance
37–66	Juan Ángel Martini Sr.	Argentina	Unknown	Did not advance
37–66	Eric Lucke	South Africa	Unknown	Did not advance
37–66	William Jones	Canada	Unknown	Did not advance
37–66	Carl Beck-Friis	Sweden	Unknown	Did not advance
37–66	Joseph Grech	Malta	Unknown	Did not advance
37–66	Rafael de Juan	Spain	Unknown	Did not advance
37–66	Marcel Rué	Monaco	Unknown	Did not advance
37–66	Aly Knepper	Luxembourg	Unknown	Did not advance
37–66	Xavier Zequeira	Puerto Rico	Unknown	Did not advance
37–66	Ong Hock Eng	Malaya	Unknown	Did not advance
37–66	Franco Bonato	Venezuela	Unknown	Did not advance
37–66	Marcel Otto-Bruc	France	Unknown	Did not advance
—	B. Bratinov	Bulgaria	DNS	Did not advance
—	K. Lee Jong	South Korea	DNS	Did not advance
—	J. Graf Kesselstatt	Liechtenstein	DNS	Did not advance
—	M. Ouhafsa	Morocco	DNS	Did not advance
—	Zygmunt Kiszkurno	Poland	DNS	Did not advance
—	F. Rua Jose	Puerto Rico	DNS	Did not advance
