= Hussam El-Badrawi =

Egyptian sports shooter

Personal information
- Born: 1935 (age 90–91) Talkha, Egypt

Sport
- Sport: Sports shooting

Hussam El-Badrawi (born 1935) is an Egyptian former sports shooter. He competed in the trap event at the 1960 Summer Olympics.
