= Marcel Otto-Bruc =

French sports shooter (1922–2003)

Personal information
- Full name: Mathieu Marcel Otto-Bruc
- Born: 23 December 1922 Monaco-Ville, Monaco
- Died: 12 June 2003 (aged 80) Monaco-Ville, Monaco

Sport
- Sport: Sports shooting

Mathieu Marcel Otto-Bruc (23 December 1922 – 12 June 2003) was a French sports shooter. He competed in the trap event at the 1960 Summer Olympics. Otto-Bruc died in Monaco-Ville on 12 June 2003, at the age of 80.
