= 1965 World Shotgun Championships =

International sport shooting competition

The 1965 World Shotgun Championships were separate ISSF World Shooting Championships for the trap and skeet events held in Santiago, Chile.

== Medal count ==
* Host nation (Chile)

Rank	Nation	Gold	Silver	Bronze	Total
1	Chile (CHI)*	1	1	0	2
2	West Germany (FRG)	1	0	0	1
3	United States (USA)	0	1	1	2
4	Venezuela (VEN)	0	0	1	1
Totals (4 entries)		2	2	2	6

== Results ==
Individual
Trap
1st place, gold medalist(s)	Mario Enrique Juan Lira (CHI)	292
2nd place, silver medalist(s)	Peter Roussos (USA)	290
3rd place, bronze medalist(s)	William Abbott (USA)	290
Skeet
1st place, gold medalist(s)	Konrad Wirnhier (FRG)	199
2nd place, silver medalist(s)	Jorge Jottar (CHI)	196
3rd place, bronze medalist(s)	Guillermo Raydan (VEN)	195
