= Tunnel 88 =

Tunnel in Nangang, Lienchiang, Taiwan

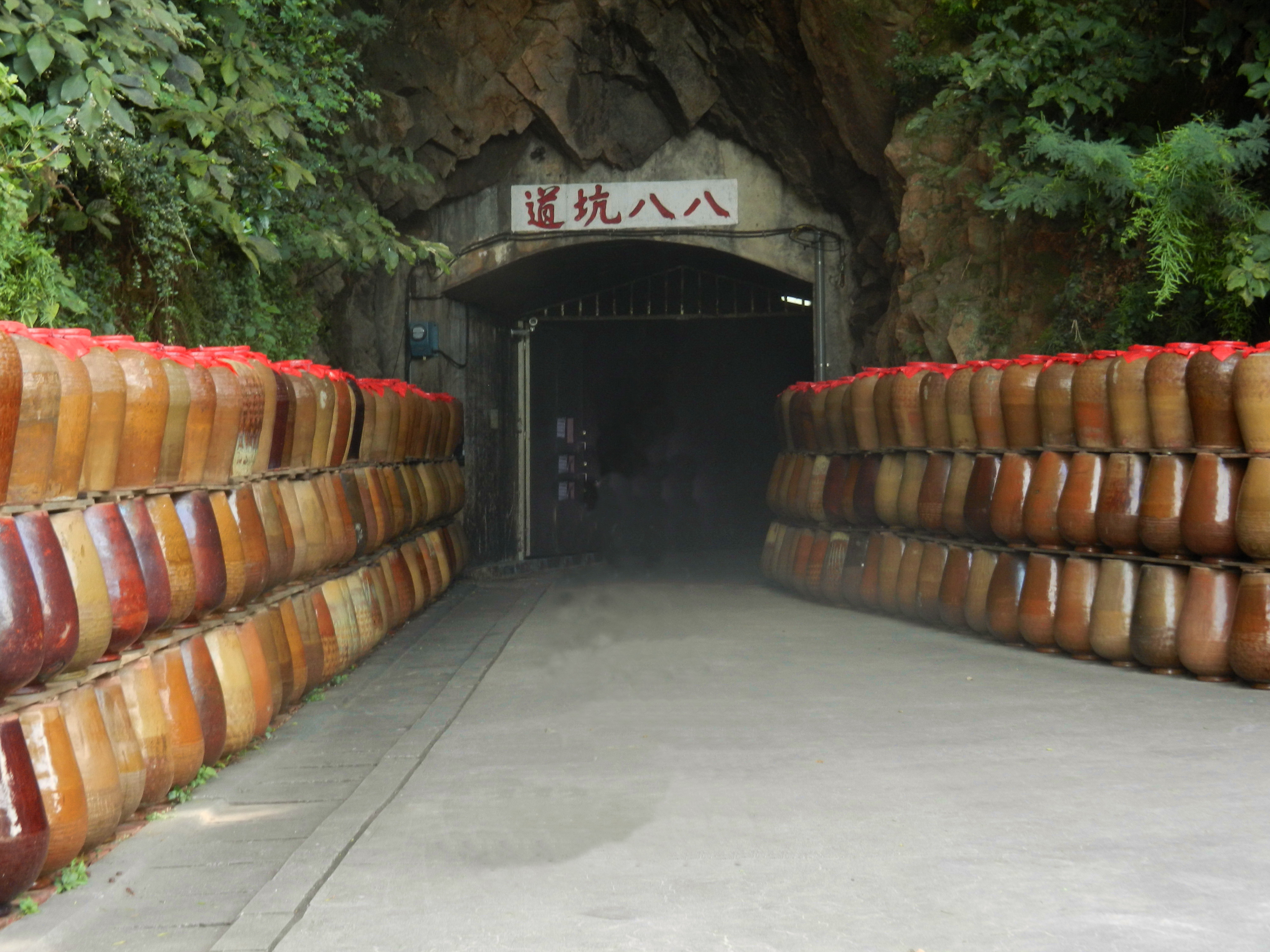
- Interactive map of Tunnel 88

Overview
- Official name: 八八坑道
- Location: Nangan, Lienchiang, Taiwan
- Coordinates: 26°9′37.1″N 119°57′11.7″E

Operation
- Opened: 1974

Technical
- Length: 264 m (866 ft)

The Tunnel 88 (Chinese: 八八坑道; pinyin: Bābā Kēngdào) is a tunnel in Nangan Township, Lienchiang County, Taiwan.

== History ==
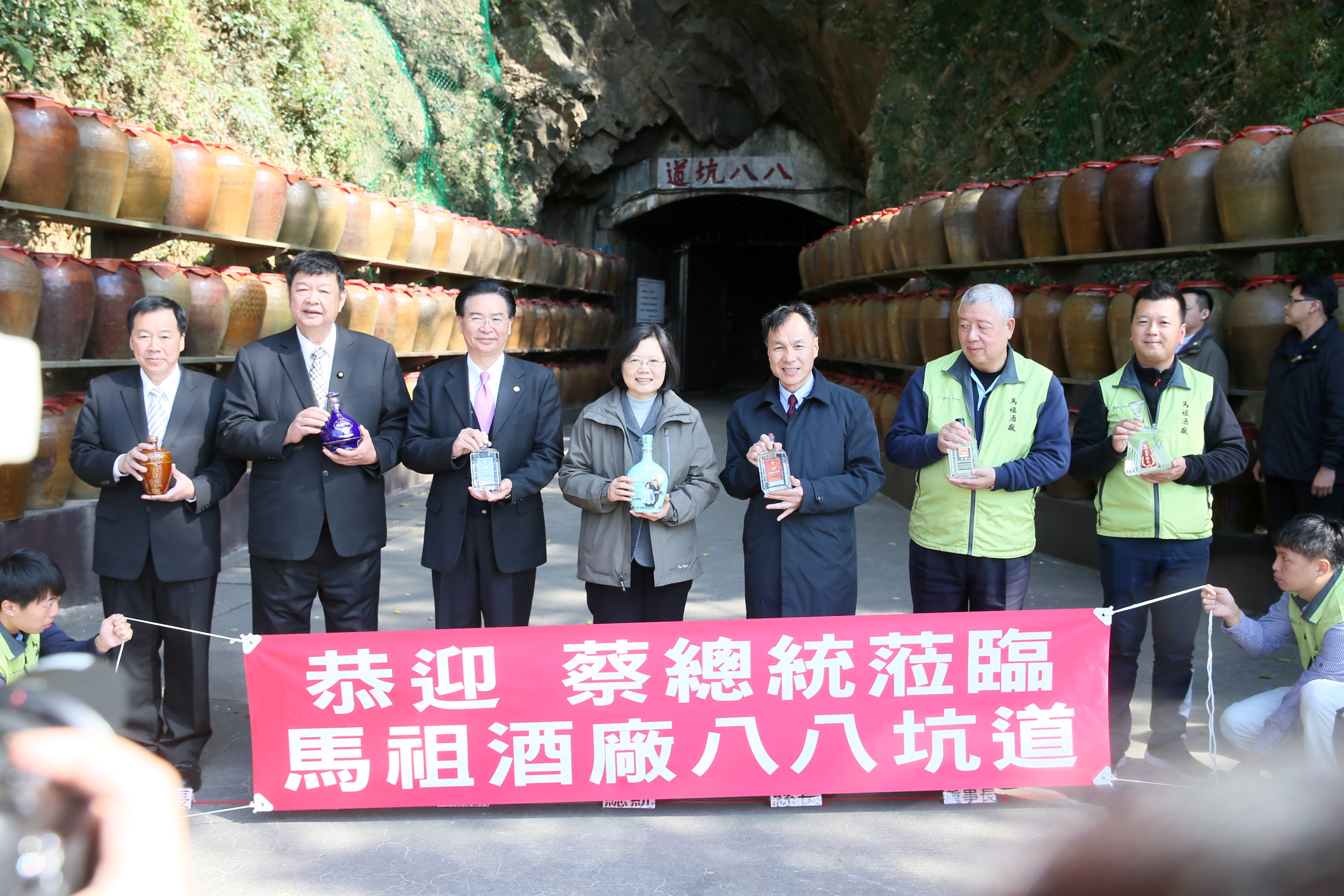
President Tsai Ing-wen visiting Tunnel 88

The tunnel was dug and enlarged by the Republic of China Armed Forces in 1974 to accommodate tanks in the aftermath of Second Taiwan Strait Crisis with the People's Liberation Army in 1958. It took them 10 years to finish the work. It was then named Tunnel 88 to commemorate the 88th birthday of Chiang Kai-shek in 1975, the year he died. The tunnel was later used by Chunghwa Telecom for apparatus room. In 1992, it was handed over to Matsu Distillery. Currently the tunnel is used to store jugs of Kaoliang liquor.

== Architecture ==
At the front entrance of the tunnel, there are rows of wine jug stacks.

== Geology ==
The tunnel is a granite rock type with 264 meters long. The front side faces the sea and the back side faces the former Nangan military airport. The temperature inside the tunnel is 15-20°C.

== See also ==
- List of tourist attractions in Taiwan
