= Eric Lucke =

South African sports shooter

Personal information
- Born: 3 February 1911 Kimberley, Northern Cape, South Africa
- Died: 9 April 1990 (aged 79) KwaZulu-Natal, South Africa

Sport
- Sport: Sports shooting

Eric Lucke (3 February 1911 – 9 April 1990) was a South African sports shooter. He competed in the trap event at the 1960 Summer Olympics.
