= Ede Szomjas =

Hungarian sports shooter

Personal information
- Born: 6 September 1914 Budapest, Austria-Hungary
- Died: 8 March 1987 (aged 72)

Sport
- Sport: Sports shooting

Ede Szomjas (6 September 1914 – 8 March 1987) was a Hungarian sports shooter. He competed in the trap event at the 1960 Summer Olympics.
