= Václav Zavázal =

Czech sport shooter

Personal information
- Born: 10 February 1921 Zalužany, Czechoslovakia
- Died: 11 March 1986 (aged 65) Prague

Sport
- Sport: Sport shooting

Václav Zavázal (10 February 1921 – 11 March 1986) was a Czech sport shooter. He competed in the trap event at the 1960 Summer Olympics. He died on 11 March 1986, at the age of 65.
