= 1967 World Shotgun and Running Target Championships =

International sport shooting competition

The 1967 World Shotgun and Running Target Championships were separate ISSF World Shooting Championships for the trap, skeet and 50 metre running target events held in Bologna, Italy.

== Medal count ==
* Host nation (Italy)

| Rank | Nation | Gold | Silver | Bronze | Total |
|---|---|---|---|---|---|
| 1 | Soviet Union (URS) | 3 | 4 | 3 | 10 |
| 2 | West Germany (FRG) | 2 | 0 | 0 | 2 |
| 3 | Italy (ITA)* | 1 | 1 | 1 | 3 |
| 3 | Sweden (SWE) | 1 | 1 | 1 | 3 |
| 5 | Belgium (BEL) | 1 | 0 | 0 | 1 |
| 6 | United States (USA) | 0 | 2 | 1 | 3 |
| 7 | Denmark (DEN) | 0 | 0 | 1 | 1 |
| 7 | Poland (POL) | 0 | 0 | 1 | 1 |
| Totals (8 entries) | | 8 | 8 | 8 | 24 |

== Shotgun events ==
=== Men ===
| Individual | | | Teams | | |
|---|---|---|---|---|---|
Trap
| 1st place, gold medalist(s) | Guy Renard (BEL) | 283 | 1st place, gold medalist(s) | Italy | 732 |
| 2nd place, silver medalist(s) | Raichard Loffelmacher (USA) | 282 | 2nd place, silver medalist(s) | United States | 719 |
| 3rd place, bronze medalist(s) | Adam Smelczyński (POL) | 282 | 3rd place, bronze medalist(s) | Soviet Union | 716 |
Skeet
| 1st place, gold medalist(s) | Konrad Wirnhier (FRG) | 198 | 1st place, gold medalist(s) | Soviet Union | 392 |
| 2nd place, silver medalist(s) | Yevgeni Petrov (URS) | 197 | 2nd place, silver medalist(s) | Italy | 375 |
| 3rd place, bronze medalist(s) | Yuri Tsuranov (URS) | 197 | 3rd place, bronze medalist(s) | Denmark | 374 |

=== Women ===
Individual
Trap
| 1st place, gold medalist(s) | Elisabeth von Soden (FRG) | 86 |
| 2nd place, silver medalist(s) | Valentina Gerasina (URS) | 82 |
| 3rd place, bronze medalist(s) | Vera Verigina (URS) | 77 |
Skeet
| 1st place, gold medalist(s) | Larisa Gurvich (URS) | 94 |
| 2nd place, silver medalist(s) | Claudia Smirnova (URS) | 93 |
| 3rd place, bronze medalist(s) | Mirella Lenzini (ITA) | 85 |

== Running target events ==
| Individual | | | Teams | | |
|---|---|---|---|---|---|
50 metre running target
| 1st place, gold medalist(s) | Martin Nordfors (SWE) | 171 | 1st place, gold medalist(s) | Soviet Union | 638 |
| 2nd place, silver medalist(s) | Vladimir Veselov (URS) | 164 | 2nd place, silver medalist(s) | Sweden | 624 |
| 3rd place, bronze medalist(s) | Stig Johansson (SWE) | 163 | 3rd place, bronze medalist(s) | United States | 587 |
