= Bill Gulliver =

Zimbabwean sports shooter

Personal information
- Born: 28 December 1912 Sheffield, England
- Died: June 21, 1998 (aged 85) Harare, Zimbabwe

Sport
- Sport: Sports shooting

William John Gulliver (28 December 1912 - 21 June 1998) is a Zimbabwean former sports shooter. He competed for Rhodesia in the trap event at the 1960 Summer Olympics.
