= Josef Hrach =

Personal information
- Born: 7 May 1929 Libušín, Czechoslovakia

Sport
- Sport: Sport shooting

Josef Hrach (born 7 May 1929) is a Czech former sport shooter. He competed in the trap event at the 1960 Summer Olympics.
