= William Jones (sport shooter) =

Canadian sports shooter

Personal information
- Born: 29 September 1928
- Died: 16 August 2017 (aged 88)

Sport
- Sport: Sports shooting

William Jones (29 September 1928 – 16 August 2017) was a Canadian sports shooter. He competed in the trap event at the 1960 Summer Olympics.
