= Hassan Moaffi =

Egyptian sports shooter

Personal information
- Born: 1931; Alexandria, Egypt
- Died: 22 November 1975 (aged 43–44); Alexandria, Egypt

Sport
- Sport: Sports shooting

Hassan Moaffi (1931 – 22 November 1975) was an Egyptian sports shooter. He competed in the trap event at the 1960 Summer Olympics.
