= Wenzu Vella =

Maltese sports shooter

Personal information
- Born: 5 March 1924 Malta
- Died: 27 April 2003 (aged 79) Malta

Sport
- Sport: Sports shooting

Wenzu Vella (5 March 1924 – 27 April 2003) was a Maltese sports shooter. He competed in the trap event at the 1960 Summer Olympics.
