= Mitsuo Yamane =

Japanese sports shooter

Personal information
- Born: 9 September 1924 Yamaguchi, Japan

Sport
- Sport: Sports shooting

Mitsuo Yamane (山根 三雄, Yamane Mitsuo; born 9 September 1924) is a Japanese former sports shooter. He competed in the trap event at the 1960 Summer Olympics.
