= Aly Knepper =

Luxembourgish sports shooter

Personal information
- Born: 11 March 1940 Echternach, Italy
- Died: 27 December 2019 (aged 79)

Sport
- Sport: Sports shooting

Aly Knepper (11 March 1940 – 27 December 2019) was a Luxembourgish sports shooter. He competed in the trap event at the 1960 Summer Olympics.
