= 1950 World Shotgun Championships =

International sport shooting competition

The 1950 World Shotgun Championships was a competition held in Madrid, Spain. Carola Mandel of the United States became the first woman to ever win a world championship medal in shooting when she finished third in Madrid's Trap competition.

== Medal count ==
Rank	Country	Gold	Silver	Bronze	Total
1	Italy	1	1	1	3
2	United States	1	0	1	2
3	Great Britain	0	1	0	1

== Results ==
Skeet
Gold	Gerard Batten (USA)	98
Silver	William Mariot (GBR)	94
Bronze	Carola Mandel (USA)	92
Trap
Gold	Carlo Sala (ITA)	296
Silver	Ialo Bellini (ITA)	293
Bronze	Giulio Prati (ITA)	292
Trap, Team
Gold	(Italy) Italy; Carlo Sala; Italo Bellini; Giulio Prati; Giacomo Prati	
Silver	(Greece) Greece; Jean Coutzis; Manfredi; George Coutzis; Lynardakis	
Bronze	(Spain) Spain; Mascort Amigo; Serrahima; Sarasqueta; Rafael Juan Garcia	
