= 300 metre rifle =

300 metre rifle (formerly called free rifle) is the name of two ISSF shooting events:

- 300 m rifle three positions
- 300 m rifle prone
- 300 m standard rifle
