= Serrahima =

Serrahima is a surname. Notable people with the surname include:

- Berta Serrahima (born 2001), Spanish field hockey player
- Juan Serrahima (1905–1959), Spanish sprinter
- Lluís Serrahima (1931–2020), Spanish singer-songwriter
- Marc Serrahima (born 1995), Spanish field hockey player
