= Johan Broman =

Finnish politician (1877–1953)

Johan Wilhelm Broman (6 April 1877 in Vaasa – 2 June 1953) was a Finnish lawyer and politician. He was a member of the Parliament of Finland from 1927 to 1929, representing the Swedish People's Party of Finland (SFP).
