= Kampala Kids League =

Ugandan kids league

Kampala Kids League is a programme in Kampala, Uganda that offers opportunities for children from different social, economic and religious backgrounds to mix and play together.

== History ==
Kampala Kids League (KKL) was founded by Trevor Dudley (a British resident of Kampala) in 1998 to help boys and girls aged 4–14 in the capital city of Uganda to improve their lives through sport.

Schools in the city were coming under pressure at that time to improve academic results and sports were being excluded. New schools were also being built without playing fields. Children in Uganda therefore needed the opportunity to play team sports.

Since then over 16,000 boys and girls from over 160 different Schools, Orphanages and Street Children's organisations have successfully completed over 50 different seasons of Football, Basketball, Baseball and Mini Cricket activity. Over 2,000 adult volunteers have been trained as coaches and administrators and over 150 different local corporate sponsors have supported the leagues.

In 2003 Trevor Dudley was awarded a fellowship from Ashoka Foundation for creating significant social change in Kampala. He was awarded an MBE in the New Years Honours of 2008 for services to children's sport and health education in Uganda.

Between 2001 and 2009, KKL prepared a youth soccer squad to travel to Europe. The team won 21 international soccer tournaments, including the Gothia Cup World Youth Cup (six times), Norway Cup, Tivoli Cup (eight times), Football Festival Denmark (three times), Haarlem Cup, Pitea Summer Games, and Storsjocquen tournaments. Former KKL participants have gone on to join the Ugandan Cranes National Football Team, and some have received placements in European academies. Dorian Viktor Klonaridis later joined Lille FC.

In 2005 the KKL Mini Cricket programme was awarded the International Cricket Council's (ICC) Best Junior Cricket Initiative Award in Africa.

KKL relies on corporate funding to support its innovative social sports programmes

Following the success of KKL, The Kids League (Uganda) (TKL) was set up in 2004 as a non profit to help boys and girls aged 8–15 at grassroots level throughout Uganda improve their lives using sport.

In 2010 Trevor officially retired and his son, Mark Dudley took over the organisation.

== Royal visit ==
In November 2007, KKL was honoured with a visit by the Prince of Wales during the CHOGM conference taking place that year in Uganda. It was the first visit of the Prince of Wales to Uganda.

Prince Charles visited the offices of KKL and met all the staff and 20 boys and girls representing programmes that KKL and TKL had established. Prince Charles lifted one of the Gothia Cup trophies and took penalties against one of the boys much to the delight of the waiting photographers. The Prince of Wales unveiled a plaque on the KKL office block to commemorate the visit.
