= Arne Broman =

Swedish mathematician

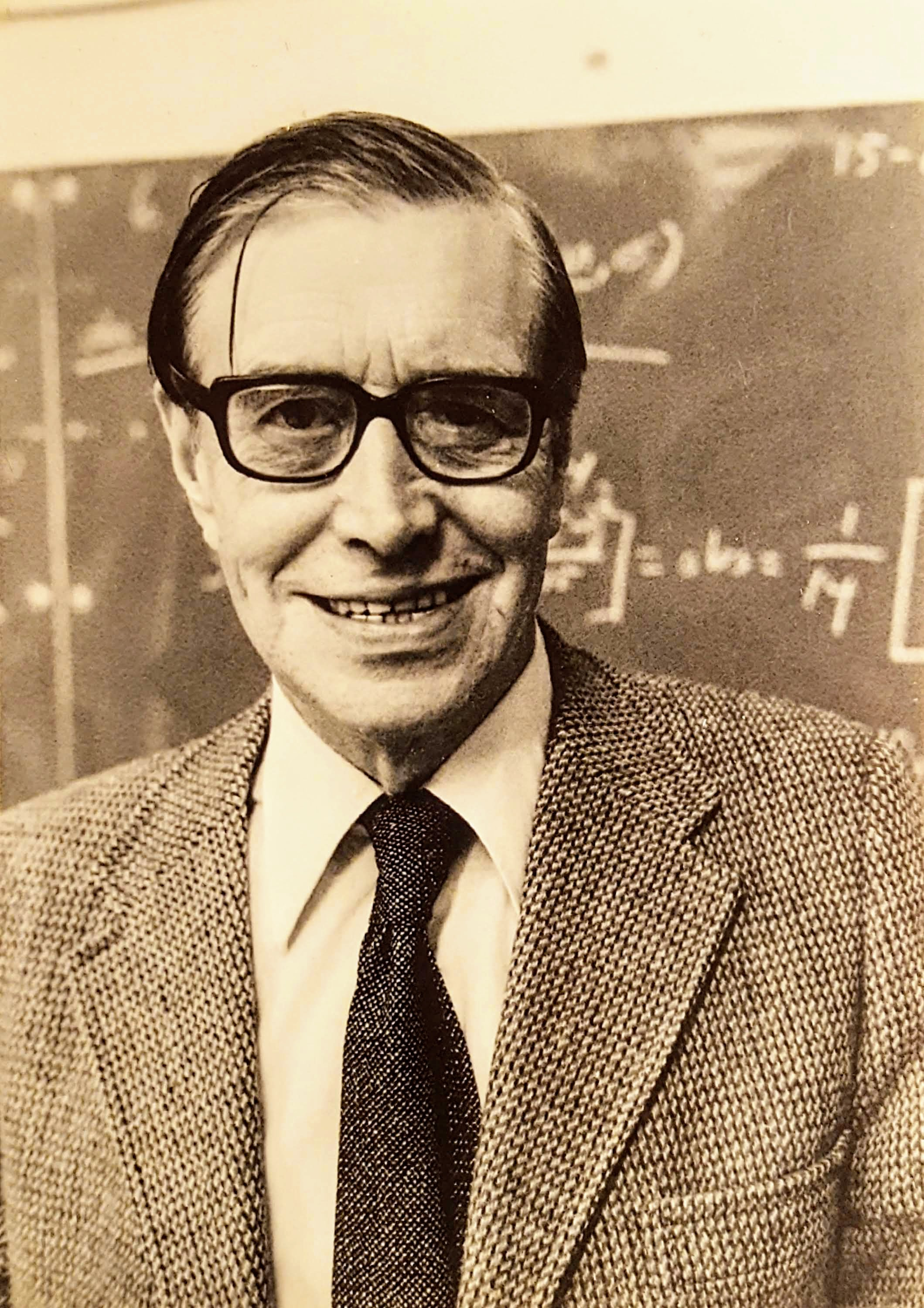
- Born: 1913; Sweden
- Died: 1995 (aged 81–82)
- Occupation: Mathematician
- Children: Lars, Eva, Pelle

Arne E. Broman (1913–1995) was a Swedish mathematician working on analysis. He received his Ph.D. at Uppsala University in 1947, with the thesis On two classes of trigonometrical series, and had Arne Beurling as thesis advisor. He worked as a high school teacher from 1938 to 1954, and from 1954 was an associate professor ("laborator") at Chalmers University of Technology.
