= 1959 World Shotgun Championships =

International sport shooting competition

The 1959 World Shotgun Championships were held in Cairo, Egypt, the United Arab Republic.

== Medal count ==
| Rank | Country | Gold | Silver | Bronze | Total |
|---|---|---|---|---|---|
| 1 | Italy | 1 | 1 | 1 | 3 |
| 1 | Soviet Union | 1 | 1 | 1 | 3 |
| 3 | Egypt | 1 | 0 | 1 | 2 |
| 4 | Lebanon | 0 | 1 | 0 | 1 |

== Results ==
| Individual | | | Team | | |
|---|---|---|---|---|---|
Trap
| Gold | Hassan Badrawi (EGY) | 293 | Gold | Italy | 578 |
| Silver | Edoardo Casciano (ITA) | 292 | Silver | Lebanon | 572 |
| Bronze | Galliano Rossini (ITA) | 290 | Bronze | Egypt | 569 |
Skeet
| Gold | Oleg Losev (URS) | 195 | | | |
| Silver | Yury Curanov (URS) | 192 | | | |
| Bronze | Nikolay Curnev (URS) | 191 | | | |
