= Hughart, West Virginia =

- Unincorporated community
- Location within West Virginia Location within the United States
- Coordinates: 37°54′07″N 80°33′04″W
- Country: United States
- State: West Virginia
- County: Greenbrier
- Elevation: 2,060 ft (630 m)
- Time zone: UTC-5 (Eastern (EST))
  - Summer (DST): UTC-4 (EDT)
- Area codes: 304 & 681
- GNIS feature ID: 1554755

Hughart is an unincorporated community in Greenbrier County, West Virginia, United States. Hughart is 9 miles (14 km) northwest of Lewisburg.

The community was named after nearby Hughart Creek.
