= Väinö Broman =

Finnish sports shooter

Personal information
- Full name: Väinö Harry Broman
- Born: 29 December 1932 (age 93) Helsinki, Finland

Sport
- Sport: Sports shooting

Väinö Harry Broman (born 29 December 1932) is a Finnish former sports shooter. He competed in the trap event at the 1960 Summer Olympics.
