= Willy Schnyder =

Swiss sports shooter

Personal information
- Born: 24 January 1894
- Died: 12 March 1946 (aged 52)

Sport
- Sport: Sports shooting

Willy Schnyder (24 January 1894 – 12 March 1946) was a Swiss sports shooter. He competed in two events at the 1924 Summer Olympics.
