= Platon Georgitsis =

Greek sport shooter

Personal information
- Born: Cairo, Egypt

Sport
- Sport: Sports shooting

Platon Georgitsis is a Greek former sports shooter. He competed in the trap event at the 1960 Summer Olympics.
