= Gerhard Aßmus =

German sports shooter (born 1928)

Personal information
- Born: 25 September 1928 Brandis, Germany

Sport
- Sport: Sports shooting

Gerhard Aßmus (born 25 September 1928) is a German former sports shooter. He competed in the trap event at the 1960 Summer Olympics.
