= Victor Huthart =

British sports shooter

Personal information
- Born: 16 December 1924 Dalston, London, England
- Died: 12 February 1997 (aged 72) Carlisle, Cumbria, England

Sport
- Sport: Sports shooting

Victor Huthart (16 December 1924 – 12 February 1997) was a British sports shooter. He competed in the trap event at the 1960 Summer Olympics.
