= Alby Broman =

Australian rules footballer, born 1917

Personal information
- Full name: Albert Ryno Broman
- Born: 19 January 1917; Caulfield, Victoria
- Died: 6 June 1977 (aged 60); South Melbourne, Victoria
- Original team: Richmond City
- Height: 173 cm (5 ft 8 in)
- Weight: 76 kg (168 lb)

Playing career^{1}
Years	Club	Games (Goals)
1937–1939	Richmond	7 (0)
- ^{1} Playing statistics correct to the end of 1939.

Albert Ryno Broman (19 January 1917 – 6 June 1977) was an Australian rules footballer who played for the Richmond Football Club in the Victorian Football League (VFL).
