= Bridge of Birds =

Novel by Barry Hughart

- First edition, hard cover dust jacket
- Author: Barry Hughart
- Language: English
- Series: Chronicles of Master Li and Number Ten Ox
- Subject: China -- Fiction
- Genre: Historical, fantasy
- Publisher: St. Martin's Press
- Publication date: 1984
- Publication place: USA
- Media type: Book
- Pages: 248
- ISBN: 0-312-09551-1
- OCLC: 10147148
- Dewey Decimal: 813/.54 19
- LC Class: PS3558.U347 B7 1984
- Followed by: The Story of the Stone

Bridge of Birds is a fantasy novel by Barry Hughart, first published in 1984. It is the first of three novels in The Chronicles of Master Li and Number Ten Ox series. The original draft of Bridge of Birds is included in a special slipcased version of the omnibus collection, The Chronicles of Master Li and Number Ten Ox, released by Subterranean Press in 2008.

Hughart called the novel "a modern version of a classical form of Chinese novel, which was an underground Taoist form designed to fight back against Confucians. Confucians liked to castrate people who fought the establishment. Without mentioning names, the Taoists could use real emperors and real power structure in a fantasy form."

== Plot ==
The book is set in a fantastical version of imperial China (Hughart subtitled it "A Novel of an Ancient China That Never Was"). It draws on and reinvents the traditional tale of The Cowherd and the Weaver Girl and other myths, poems and incidents from Chinese history. The real story of the Cowherd and Weaver Girl is referenced at the end of the book.

In the beginning of the novel, the village of Ku-fu is stricken by a plague which kills its silkworms and sends its children between the ages of eight and thirteen into a coma. Number Ten Ox, the narrator, is dispatched to find a wise man who can cure the children. In Peking, he finds Master Li Kao, a drunken scholar with a self-described "slight flaw in his character", who immediately identifies the cause of the plague as ku poison, an incurable poison inflicted on the village by two dishonest villagers trying to corner the silk crop. In order to cure the children, Ox and Master Li set out to find the Great Root of Power, which can cure anything. They begin by seeking it in the palace of the feared Ancestress.

As it turns out, however, the Ancestress possesses only the lesser Root of Power, and the true Great Root is in the possession of the tyrannical and avaricious Duke of Ch'in. After surviving the Duke of Ch'in's deadly games that consisted of labyrinths and terrible monsters, they succeed in gathering different parts of the Ginseng. Still, these are all ineffective in curing the children. Along with the Ginseng, they also find three handmaiden ghosts that repeated the same story, "The birds of China must fly!" One of the many people they meet in their adventure is Henpecked Ho, who tells them the story of how a god, Star Shepherd, fell in love with a human girl, who was given the title of Princess of Birds. They also meet Key Rabbit, who is married to Lotus Cloud. Like every other man with a pure heart, Ox worships Lotus Cloud and showers her with expensive gifts. The heroes visit the Old Man of the Mountain. There they learn that in order to become immortal one must obtain something from the gods, and to become invulnerable one's heart must be removed. This information helps them figure out that somehow their quest to find the Ginseng is intertwined with the story of the Princess of Birds. They also conclude that the Duke of Ch'in knows the secrets of immortality and invulnerability, and was the same Duke who tricked the Princess of Birds and her three handmaidens centuries ago.

Master Li and Number Ten Ox are able to find the Duke's heart. The Duke is killed, and Master Li bows to Lotus Cloud and calls her the Princess of Birds. Master Li and Number Ten Ox listen to a sound that turns out to be the sound of a trillion birds making a bridge to heaven. The Princess places the Great Root of Power in Ox's hand. Back at the village of Ku-Fu, the children are cured. Great glorious explosions of stars streak across the sky as Star Shepherd opens his arms to receive Lotus Cloud, the Princess of Birds.

== Characters ==
Among the book's many characters, the major ones include:

- Number Ten Ox (Lu-Yu): An orphaned child raised by his aunt and uncle, Ox becomes a strong man. He joins Li Kao on a journey to cure the children of Ku-Fu from Ku-poison, overcoming many obstacles and defeating numerous monsters.
- Li Kao (Master Li): A wise man from Peking, with a slight flaw in his character. He joins Ox on his quest.
- Ma the Grub: A fraud working with Pawnbroker Fang to scam the people of the village. He sells mulberry leaves designed to poison the silkworm larvae; the children accidentally ingest the poison while feeding the larvae.
- Pawnbroker Fang: A fraudulent pawnbroker, the father of Fang's Fawn and Fang's Flea, scamming the people making him the richest man in the town. In attempting to sabotage the silkworms, he poisons the children of Ku-Fu.
- The Ancestress: The evil, ruthless, repulsively overweight female leader of China. She is the mother of Henpecked Ho's wife and the grandmother of Fainting Maid. She possesses a piece of the Root of Power.
- Fainting Maid: The granddaughter of the Ancestress and Henpecked Ho's daughter. When she feels offended, she pretends to faint two feet back and six to the left. Is killed when she faints into a well.
- Henpecked Ho (Ho Wen): The fearful middle-aged son-in-law of the Ancestress and father of Fainting Maid. Falls in love with his concubine Bright Star, who is killed by his daughter as a result. Assists in killing his daughter and eventually dies while killing the Ancestress.
- Miser Shen (Shen Chunlieh): A wealthy, stingy merchant who sees the light after meeting Lotus Cloud. He sells all of his fortune to please her. Killed by a crossbow bolt in the Cavern of Bells.
- Qin Shi Huang|Duke of Ch'in: The ruthless Duke of China, who can read minds and control the creatures that lurk in the dark bowels of the earth. He became invulnerable when his heart was removed and hidden. He also stole Jade Pearl's crown. He was concealing himself as the Key Rabbit. He was killed when Lotus Cloud opened the casket with his heart in it and threw it out into the garden, where it was eaten by dogs.
- Key Rabbit (Assessor of Ch'in): The Duke's Assessor and husband to Lotus Cloud.
- Jade Emperor|The August Personage of Jade: The male Emperor of Heaven. Forbade the Star Shepherd, his nephew, to ever visit Earth after Star Shepherd fell in love with Jade Pearl and ignored his tasks in Heaven. He gave Jade Pearl three feathers and made her the Princess of Birds.
- Jade Pearl: A young female peasant who later becomes the Princess of Birds in the story of The Peddler. It is revealed that, after stealing her crown, the Duke wiped her memory and renamed her Lotus Cloud. At the climax of the story, she assists in the destruction of the Duke's heart.
- The Old Man of the Mountain: The wisest man in the world. He lives in the Omei Mountains at the end of Bear's Path, and he does not sell his secrets cheaply. He gives Master Li the secret of immortality in exchange for the loot from raiding the Ancestress's castle.

== Original draft ==
Barry Hughart's unpublished original draft for Bridge of Birds featured a similar plot, but Number Ten Ox, the village of Ku-fu, and the ginseng plot were not present in the original draft.

=== Synopsis ===
The story of the original draft begins at the Monastery of Shu, whose abbot abuses Li Kao until he saves the abbot's life. The abbot then gives him a beggar's bowl and robe and tells him one day he will be called and it is his duty to follow that call. Li Kao departs on a quest to become rich and stay young in China.

Li Kao begins his journey in the city of Peking where he steals five hundred gold coins in order to start his life of wealth. While fleeing, he falls off a cliff and finds the legendary skull of Cheng Hang, who charges him to find three trinkets, a crystal ball, a bronze bell, and a small flute, in order to fix a terrible event that happened in heaven which has separated two gods in love who are unable to see each other due to the laws of heaven and can only be reunited by forming the Bridge of Birds. Li Kao is given only the knowledge of what to look for and the hint that Cheng Hang will somehow provide Li Kao with a dragon that will help guide him on his quest. His quest takes him to have multiple quarrels with the savage Duke of Ch'in who will do anything in his power to stop Li Kao from succeeding from finding a secret truth hidden inside the quest for the trinkets. In the end, he completes the quest, the Bridge of Birds is formed, and all in heaven is set right again.

== Influences ==
=== 20th century orientalist novels and chinoiserie ===
Bridge of Birds has been compared to the literary genre of chinoiserie, a synonym for "orientalist" which can refer to the genre of China-based stories (and is also used describe decorative art forms). Well-known novels in the chinoiserie tradition include the Kai Lung stories by Ernest Bramah, The Painted Veil by W. Somerset Maugham, The Good Earth by Pearl S. Buck, and the Chia Black Dragon trilogy by Stephen Marley, all novels written in the twentieth century that reflect on the landscape of China and include cultural aspects. Bramah's Kai Lung stories are said to be so accurate to the actual setting and culture of China that he must have lived there at some point in his life; however, there is no evidence of that. Since chinoiserie focuses more on the artistic and beautiful side of China, Stephen Marley likes to refer to his trilogy as Chinese Gothic because its fantasy is darker than that of a book like Bridge of Birds.

=== Classic Chinese novels ===
In the Bridge of Birds' author biography Barry Hughart mentions that the book was influenced by the fact that "vast numbers of Chinese deities had really originated as characters in novels" and Bridge of Birds contains substantial references and allusions to the Four Great Classical Novels of Chinese culture, especially Dream of the Red Chamber and Journey to the West.

Dream of the Red Chamber, written by Cao Xueqin, is one of the Four Great Classical Novels of Chinese culture. This novel turned Chinese writing toward the use of personal experience and tragedy and away from a previous reliance on well-known myths and legends and stereotypical characters that had earned fiction a reputation for moral irrelevance. This novel is mentioned in Bridge of Birds.

Journey to the West, by Wu Cheng'en, a quest story like Bridge of Birds, tells a tale of a long pilgrimage from China to India in search of enlightenment. Many obstacles like dragons, tigers, demons and monsters are faced along the way.

Romance of the Three Kingdoms was written by Luo Guanzhong, and The Water Margin is credited to Shi Nai'an. These two novels are also part of the collection of the Four Great Classical Novels of Chinese culture. Although these two novels are the least like Bridge of Birds, there are still some similarities.

=== Chinese culture ===
There are numerous allusions to actual Chinese cultural practices and events in Bridge of Birds, including the following:

- Bamboo Dragonfly – The traditional Chinese version of the illuminating flying toy was made of bamboo. This version contained two blades that functioned as the propeller. They were connected to a thin rod. When you would rub the rod with your palms, it would rotate and release the bamboo dragonfly. Because there is no electricity involved, the bamboo dragonfly did not fly to great heights. A helicopter-sized version features in the novel.
- Chinese village life – Bridge of Birds begins in a traditional Chinese village named Ku-fu. In Chinese culture, villages are traditionally considered the foundation of society because they contain the culture, traditions, and customs of China.
- Dragon Boat Festival – A Chinese holiday is celebrated by boat races on the fifth day of the fifth lunar moon, which is the same day the Chinese poet Chu Yuan died in 277 B.C. On this day citizens throw bamboo leaves filled with rice into the water symbolizing the attempt to distract fish from eating his corpse. In Bridge of Birds, a man dressed as the dead poet appears to rob the celebrants during the ceremony.
- The August Personage of Jade – A supreme Taoist deity who created the Chinese zodiac by making the animals race across the river to see the order in which they would be on the calendar. In Bridge of Birds, he manipulates the characters to save Jade Pearl.
- Dragon Dance – The dragon dance is an important part of traditional Chinese culture. The dragon dance expresses happiness and wishes. Usually performed by a group of people with stage props that they will use to form the head, body, and tail of a dragon. They perform the many different forms and models of the dance during celebrations. Master Li and Number Ten Ox perform this dance when they celebrate at the end of "Bridge of Birds".
- Ginseng is a major plot element in the book due to its legendary healing powers, which reflects traditional Chinese belief in ginseng, or ren shen, as the "king of a hundred herbs" . The actual herb reportedly assists brain function, limits the adrenal stress response, has anti-neoplastic properties, is an antioxidant, and stimulates insulin release. In traditional Chinese medicine, Ginseng is considered a "warm" food that can tonify primal qi, nourish yin Ginseng has been traded in China for over 3000 years, a fact reflected in the book.
- Legalism – Literally means "school of law". This philosophy had three subjects: fa, shu, and shi. Fa meant "law or principle" and the law code must be clearly written and made public. Laws should reward those who obey them and punish those who break them. Shu meant "method, tactic or art" and this meant that secrets were to be employed by the ruler so others cannot take control of the dynasty. Shi meant "legitimacy, power, or charisma" and this meant that the position of the ruler was what held power. In the novel, the Duke of Ch'in espouses this philosophy.
- Moon Festival – Also known as the Mid-Autumn Festival, the Mooncake Festival, or the Zhongqui Festival. Customs include eating mooncakes, matchmaking, carrying lanterns, burning incense, and Fire Dragon Dances. In Bridge of Birds, Number Ten Ox visits the city of Peking during the hectic Moon Festival.
- Sword dance – A popular dance in Chinese culture that combined the dancing of swords of all different sizes with acrobatics. Sword dancing evolved from the martial art of wu shu and was very popular within the Chinese opera performances.
- Tomb Festival – Known as Qingming Festival in China, but is also referred to as Tomb Sweeping Day because one of the major customs for this day is sweeping the tombs. This is a day spent honoring the dead. People will visit the graves of their ancestors to clean them, leave offerings of food, and honor the dead. Master Li and Number Ten Ox take the time on this day to honor their dead ancestors in "Bridge of Birds".
- Yama King – Judge of the dead in Chinese folk religion. When people die he would either grant them good fortune because they led a good life, or punish them if they led a life of evil deeds and misfortune. This religious figure is alluded to in "Bridge of Birds" when characters speak about what they want to be reborn as in their next life.

== Reception ==
=== Critical reception ===
Wendy Graham reviewed Bridge of Birds for Adventurer magazine and stated that "Deservedly a winner and highly recommended."

Most critics praised Bridge of Birds and appreciated its tone, although they agreed that the book started off slowly. The book was singled out as being beautifully written, and the plot, with its incorporation of Chinese myths, characters, and ancient figures, made the novel "a fun read". However, those same side stories and myths could make the book confusing for some readers. The book used considerable comic relief even when there was a plague, the death of children, and what seemed to be an accidental attempt at murder.

The book series is currently under option to be adapted into a live-action film.

== Publication history ==
US Edition

- Mass Market Paperback: 288 pages
- Publisher: Del Rey
- Publication date: April 12, 1985

UK Edition

- Paperback: 271 pages
- Publisher: CORGI
- Publication Date: 1986

=== Reprinted editions ===
Barry Hughart's sequels to Bridge of Birds, The Story of the Stone and Eight Skilled Gentlemen, were reprinted in 2002 in a single hardcover volume called The Chronicles of Master Li and Number Ten Ox.

The Chronicles of Master Li and Number Ten Ox Hardcover

- Hardcover: 652 pages
- Publisher: The Stars Our Destination Books
- Publication Date: 2002

The Chronicles of Master Li and Number Ten Ox Kindle Edition

- File Size: 1871 KB
- Print Length: 652 pages
- Publisher: Subterranean Press
- Publication date: August 22, 2011

== Awards ==
- 1985 World Fantasy Award – Best Novel
  - Won along with Robert Holdstock's novel: Mythago Wood
- 1986 Mythopoeic Award – Best Fantasy

== Foreign language editions ==
- Bulgarian: Мостът на птиците (s.d. https://web.archive.org/web/20110707231308/http://sf.bgway.com/autors/h/Barry_Hughart/Bbridge1.htm)
- Estonian: Linnusild (http://www.rahvaraamat.ee/p/linnusild/25333/en?isbn=9789949420902)
- French: La magnificence des oiseaux : une aventure de maître Li et boeuf numéro dix (2000; OCLC 49181060)
- German: Die Brücke der Vögel : Roman aus einem alten China, das es nie gegeben hat (1986; OCLC 52140127)
- Hebrew: גשר ציפורים / Gesher tsiporim (2002; OCLC 57289055)
- Japanese: 鳥姬伝 / Chōkiden (2002; OCLC 674971737)
- Spanish:Puente de pájaros : una novela de la antigua China que nunca existió (2007; OCLC 137316167)
