= The Story of the Stone (Hughart novel) =

Book by Barry Hughart

- First ed. hardcover dust jacket Left to right: Master Li, Moon Boy, Grief of Dawn, Number Ten Ox.
- Author: Barry Hughart
- Cover artist: Mark Harrison
- Language: English
- Series: Chronicles of Master Li and Number Ten Ox
- Subject: China -- Fiction
- Genre: Historical Fiction, Fantastic Fiction
- Publisher: Doubleday
- Publication date: 1988
- Publication place: USA
- Media type: Print
- Pages: 236
- ISBN: 0-385-24636-6
- OCLC: 17261525
- Dewey Decimal: 813/.54 19
- LC Class: PS3558.U347 S7 1988
- Preceded by: Bridge of Birds
- Followed by: Eight Skilled Gentlemen; Also published in omnibus edition: The Chronicles of Master Li and Number Ten Ox.

The Story of the Stone (Chinese: 石頭記; pinyin: Shítóu jì) is a novel by Barry Hughart, first published in 1988. It is part of a series set in a version of ancient China that began with Bridge of Birds and continues with Eight Skilled Gentlemen. The story begins on the twelfth day of the seventh moon in the Year of the Snake 3,339 (AD 650).

== Plot summary ==
The abbot of a humble monastery in the Valley of Sorrows calls upon Master Li and Number Ten Ox to investigate the killing of a monk and the theft of a seemingly inconsequential manuscript from its library. Suspicion soon lands on the infamous Laughing Prince Liu Sheng—who has been dead for about 750 years. To solve this mystery and others, the incongruous duo will have to travel across China, outwit a half-barbarian king, and saunter into (and out of) Hell itself.

== Plot ==
A wild funeral and a storm presage an attempt on Li Kao's life by a man disguised as a gambler. Number Ten Ox dumps the body in a canal. A footnote remarks that volumes two through five of the Memoirs of Number Ten Ox were seized and burnt by the Imperial Censors. Later in the Wineshop of One-eyed Wong, a low dive where classes mix, they encounter Lady Hou, a poet whose poems have been "attributed" to Yang Wan-Li. She attempts to murder a bureaucrat, but is knocked out by Wong. The trembling abbot of a humble monastery in the Valley of Sorrows approaches and asks them to investigate the killing of a monk and the theft of a strange manuscript from its library. He also says that The Laughing Prince, who has been dead for about 750 years, has arisen from his grave.

Later, they walk through the part of Peking known as Heaven's Bridge, a crime filled area. Master Li spots a robbery in progress and makes a detour to Fire Horse Park, specifically to the Eye of Tranquility, a small lake surrounded by old sinners hoping for salvation, following the tradition of Chiang Taikung, a Taoist who fished without worms. Li Kao wrings a confession about the mushrooms from a toadish fellow named Hsiang. He identifies the manuscript fragment as a Ssu-ma Ch'ien, but an obvious forgery. It has also been traced recently.

Three days later they arrive at the Valley of Sorrows. Li Kao tells the story of Prince Liu Sheng, younger brother of Emperor Wu-ti. He was appointed as lord of Dragon Head Valley. He had the peasants plant gourds, and used the seeds to burn in horn lamps to light a salt mine. He used the brine and an area of shale that seeped an odorless, easily ignited gas to dry the salt. When the salt ran out, he had work started on mining a vein of iron ore. He set up an Iron Works that used a combination of acids to produce a less brittle form of iron. The suffering of the peasants sent him into gales of laughter. At that time he became known as The Laughing Prince.

The acids had a queer effect on the water of the valley. It turned bright yellow and glowed violet at night and fish, birds and trees in the valley died. Protests were silenced when he showed that he had made quite a lot of money from it all. Then he lost all interest in making money and turned his interest to medicine. He vivisected a large number of subjects (including those who protested) and gathered like-minded people around him. He dubbed them his Monks of Mirth, and they helped him gather subjects. After a while, he fell ill and died, raving that he would return from the grave to finish the destruction of the valley.

The autopsy of Brother Squint-Eyes reveals a normal corpse that died of fright. It also reveals that he had feasted during a recent trip to Ch'ang-an. They visit the devastated Princes' Path, a flowered path whose upkeep is paid for by the Laughing Prince's fortune. The abbot tells them that the prince's descendant Liu Pao wishes to meet them. The peasants also wish them to be certain that the Laughing Prince is still in his tomb.

The estate is large but rundown, with a large garden and many birds. Oddly enough, the Family Tablets are not there as they enter, but instead a plaque containing an essay by Chen Chiju, titled "The Home Garden", one of the Four Pillars of Civilization. The prince proves to be a tall, skinny man with wild hair.

They discuss the case so far and Liu Pao shows them his ancestor's tomb. The family tablets are within the grotto where the Laughing Prince conducted his experiments. It also contains a large slate board where curious experiments mention a Stone.

A poem is carved over the tablets:

In darkness languishes the precious stone.

When will its excellence enchant the world?
When seeming is taken for being, being becomes seeming. When nothing is taken for something, something becomes nothing.
The Stone dispels seeming and nothing,

And climbs to the Gates of the Great Void.

They enter the tomb. The tomb is a small, barren room with two stone coffins, containing also his principal wife Tou Wan. The expected mummies are in the coffins.

In the village, the Feast of the Hungry Ghosts is beginning, it being the 15th day of the seventh moon. Despite the festivities, Master Li is worried. He speculates that the laughing of the Laughing Prince was due to mercury poisoning, likely due to experiments with the Elixir of Life. Suddenly a mysterious sound is heard by Number Ten Ox that Li Kao cannot hear. Master Li climbs onto Number Ten Ox's back and tells him to follow the sound. He does, running blindly into a thick mist, finally emerging on the Prince's estate, having somehow crossed a deep gorge without knowing.

An alarm rings out in the monastery. The library has been ransacked and the room of Brother Squint-Eyes has been trashed. The corpse of another monk is discovered in the library, Brother Wu Shang, also frightened to death. Another section of the path is found destroyed. Number Ten Ox sketches characters from Great Seal script in the air and recounts an insight from a strange dream he had recently.

The peasants begin to sing a work song from the Book of Odes, indicating that they require the Prince to destroy his ancestor's remains in the Pre-Confucian manner (punishable in the Eighth Hell).

With the deed done and the mummy smashed to pieces, the Prince shows them his paintings. The Prince studied with Three Incomparables, master of the p'o-mo (魄莫) style. Most of his paintings step outside those recommended in Mustard Seed Garden, an accumulated one and a half million years of exile.

Master Li becomes suspicious about the fragment and discovers that it is actually real and that the 'mistakes' are actually clues, such as the number of a dragon's scales (146, actually 153), the number of points in acupuncture (253, actually about 360) and so on. The decoded message reveals the location of the Stone. Master Li also reveals the mummy in Liu Sheng's tomb had the wrong color wrappings, imperial yellow instead of mourning white, meaning that the mummy was not that of Liu Sheng.

On the way to the cold room, they see a painting of Liu Sheng. His clothing contains all twelve buttons of rank and one other, commonly used to represent the Second Lord of Heaven, placing him in line with the Jade Emperor.

Number Ten Ox deduces where the entrance to the tunnel is and after some hard work, break into Liu Sheng's real tomb. The first chamber contains the skeletons of the workers. An iron wall is the next obstacle, but Number Ten Ox manages to make a hole in it. The next chamber is of marble and is stacked with gold and jewels. Other rooms contain the skeletons of the rest of Liu Sheng's court, but the Monks of Mirth are nowhere to be found. Beyond the throne room is Liu Sheng's real coffins, and the sacristy. The same mysterious inscription is there, but the Stone is not. The Laughing Prince's coffin is empty. Master Li deduces that there is another entrance to the tomb, since the air within was breathable.

Since revealing the treasure would cause enormous problems, they decide to hide it again. Li Kao and Number Ten Ox leave for Ch'ang-an. The capital is an overwhelming experience for Ox. While at the Brush Forest Academy (dropping off samples of the dead plants for analysis), Master Li tells the tale of Hong Wong, the young genius who was too smart for his own good. The Neo-Confucians are in power and innovation is anathema. Next he visits The Gate of the Beautiful Vista, headquarters of the Secret Service and seeks an audience with the Captain of Prostitutes. They play a game of social shuttlecock, a quoting game. He wins and asks her to direct him to a soundmaster. She gives him the name of Moon Boy, who is presently at the court of Shih Hu, the King of Chao. She loans him Grief of Dawn, the one person who can control Moon Boy. In return she asks that he find a new patron deity for prostitutes. Golden Lotus was the best, and her successors have been poor substitutes. She asks that he recommend the late Empress Wu, which he takes umbrage at. Ox becomes entranced with Grief of Dawn. The group are given postal service horses and leave.

During the long journey, they learn that Grief of Dawn has no memory of her life before she was about 18. She was found covered in blood by an old woman who later raised her. Master Li gets in by pretending to be the Greatest Living Master of the Wen-Wu lute. The king sees through the imposture, but is pleased with the performance. He collects rare people, of which Moon Boy is the jewel.

The group settle in and the king serenades Grief of Dawn, as he wants her to join his all-female group of bodyguards, the Golden Girls. Ox and Grief of Dawn go off to be alone.

The next morning, Ox and Grief of Dawn are interrupted in their love play by Moon Boy. Ox decides that Moon Boy is named after the Rabbit in the Moon, a notorious pervert. Moon Boy leaves, but they are again interrupted by Master Li.

They sneak away under cover of one of Moon Boy's performances. 100 toads glutted with Chinese lantern-flies clear out the stables and they make their escape through the kings secret exit. They dodge pursuit by boating to Loshan down the Min, past the Three Gorges and over Five Misery Rapids, past the Leshan Giant Buddha.

They then travel back to Ch'ang-an, past the village where Moon Boy was raised, resulting in some unusual scenes. Grief of Dawn's odd manners and knowledge, part peasant, part courtier are remarked on by Master Li. The samples show no traces of anything beyond natural decay. They make a visit to Serpentine Park, where Master Li cleverly obtains rubbings of the Confucian Stones. He later alters them to appear to be forgeries (changing the old form of the character 且 to its newer form) and trades them at the Pavilion of the Blessings of Heaven, a library, for the tracings sold by Brother Squint-Eyes.

Later, reclining under a tree, Master Li asks Ox to tell the story of Li Ling-chi, about an emperor who wanted tangerines in winter and was so expert in manipulating c-hi that he was able to pull the tangerine trees from where they were growing in the south and cause them to grow in the north. Master Li then reads a story from a scroll containing the frame story of Dream of the Red Chamber, concerning a legend of Nü Kua, a sentient Stone and an evil flower named Purple Pearl. The flawed stone gains an evil soul from the handling of the goddess. It wanders around heaven causing mischief, until the Jade Emperor brought it in contact with Purple Pearl. The stone brought water to nourish the flower, which exorcised the evil, causing the flower to fall in love with the stone. It vowed to do the same for the stone. Later the stone returned to earth. Lao Tzu briefly possessed it, but hurled it away, crying "Evil!", as did Chuang Tzu.

The deciphered text agrees, citing a tablet from the Cave of Yu and gives a description of the appearance of the stone and that Ssu-ma Ch'ien had attempted to destroy the stone with an axe, splitting it in three pieces. It asks scholars to destroy the stone, as soldiers could not.

Master Li wonders about the sound and the destruction of Princes' Path. Moon Boy explains that the sound was likely related to the phenomenon of the soul-sound of stone (Lithophone).

Ox learns of the story of Wolf Boy and Fire Girl from the local boy's society. The plot deals with an attempt to kill the Laughing Prince, and includes a fragment of text similar to that found in the sacristy.

A clue in the tale leads them to a hidden cave and the bodies of two gardeners who vanished 33 years ago. They explore the caves passages fruitlessly and emerge just as King Shih Hu and his Golden Girls catch up to them. Grief of Dawn is wounded in the struggle and the King and his Golden Girls depart sorrowfully.

Grief of Dawn mutters in her fever, saying strange things that leave Master Li confused. To heal her, he requires the seeds of a Bombay thorn apple. They stop at the abandoned Unicorn Hall, to look at a portrait of Tou Wan, specifically her hairpin, which had a point fashioned from stone.

They arrive at the Temple of Illusion. Master Li intends that they take a voyage inside his mind, to rediscover the location of the thorn apple, which he has forgotten in the 60 years since. The three sit in a room in the temple and have a meal of wine and devil's ear mushrooms. A plaque has the story of the Butterfly Dream. The mushrooms begin to take effect and they are directed to the garden.

Master Li converses with a skull in a patch of reeds, which write in the air, communicating the thoughts of Liu Ling. The two talk of old times and Master Li tells it he wishes Moon Boy to look in a certain mirror. The skull is apprehensive since only three others (Emperor T'ang, Chou the Rouge and Crazy Ch'i) have returned from the trip.

The trio enter Hell and successfully bypass the first gate to the levels of Feng-tu by impersonating an official inspector with his retinue, made possible by the Neo-Confucians having taken over the running of the place. Number Ten Ox's look in the mirror reveals this to be his first human incarnation. Moon Boy, however, is the most recent on an attempt to reform a seriously evil soul. Li also discovers that the Laughing prince has yet to arrive in Hell. Eventually, they trick their way out of Hell, arriving back in the garden where they started, with the location of the apple.

The potion works and Grief of Dawn is restored to health. The things she mentioned in her fever seem to confirm that she was Tou Wan's maid in a previous incarnation almost 800 years ago. He also concludes that the story of Wolf Boy and Fire girl has some basis in fact. Li mesmerizes Grief of Dawn to bring up her buried memories of how she escaped from the caves. She stops at a large boulder, which has a hidden door.

They descend steps to an underground river with large stone statues at intervals of death gods from various cultures, like Yen-wang-yeh, Emma-hoo, Gilgamesh, Osiris and others. They climb a steep flight of steps and emerge in an antechamber with four statues holding four canopic jars in Chinese style and four doors. The first door leads to the tomb, where they discover that Tou Wan's Hairpin, which had a piece of the Stone, is indeed missing. The next door leads to a room containing the Laughing Prince's medical research. He was using the Stone to chart the patterns of ch'i and shih. The third door leads to a series of polished chutes that exit in the underground river. Lio Pau is not there and they find tassels from his robe leading up a flight of stairs to a side passage. Moon Boy produces the illusion that they have entered and the roof of the tunnel collapses.

They climb the staircase and accidentally discover a secret door leading into the paymaster's office. The fourth door leads to a sloping tunnel and a cavern where the Monks of Mirth are celebrating the Festival of Laughter. One is placed on Number Ten Ox's back and starts to squeeze his neck. The monks are revealed as living corpses and the one on his back is the Laughing Prince. He manages to oil the corpse and squeeze it off. He hacks it to pieces with an axe, but the pieces continue to speak and move. Finally he lights it with a torch and the monks cease to move. Master Li recovers the Stone from the Laughing Prince, where it had revitalized his corpse after his death.

They are approached by Girl of Fire, who claims to know the location of Prince Liu Pao, but she tricks them into entering a collapsing cave. Grief of Dawn is killed but Moon Boy refuses to leave her body, instead carrying her to safety. They are then reunited with Girl of Fire. Master Li realises that she is actually the Prince in disguise. Liu Pao had wanted the power of the Stone, which he kept hung around his neck. The stone is a natural inkstone.

They manage to kill Liu Pao by using the Kung Shang Chueh call, thus knocking him off the gorge.

It is revealed Moon Boy is the stunningly beautiful reincarnated Purple Pearl. When the Stone stumbled upon Purple Pearl all those years ago, it washed away all the evil Purple Pearl had succumbed to. In return, Purple Pearl vowed to do the same to the Stone. After discovering this, Moon Boy fulfills the vow and commits suicide to be with Grief of Dawn.

== Main characters ==
- Li Kao - a sage with a slight flaw in his character
- Number Ten Ox - a quite strong peasant boy
- Grief of Dawn, girl with a mysterious past and a connection to:
- Moon Boy, an appallingly perverse hooligan (屁精)
- Liu Sheng
- The Stone

== Reviews ==
Library Journal stated that "This sequel to Bridge of Birds (Del Rey, 1985) reaffirms Hughart's gift for comic fantasy as well as his talent for ingenious storytelling."

The Washington Post stated that "the sly humorous tone and affectionate homage to our western ideas of early China are what really make Hughart special." Hughart "also incorporates a good deal of actual Chinese lore; the very title of his book, and various incidental details, pay homage to the most famous Chinese novel, more familiarly known as The Dream of the Red Chamber.

The Christian Science Monitor described the book as "Intricately nested plot boxes [which] reveal and conceal mysterious Oriental characters - people and calligraphy alike."
