= Kinmen Kaoliang Liquor =

Kinmen Kaoliang Liquor Inc. 金門酒廠
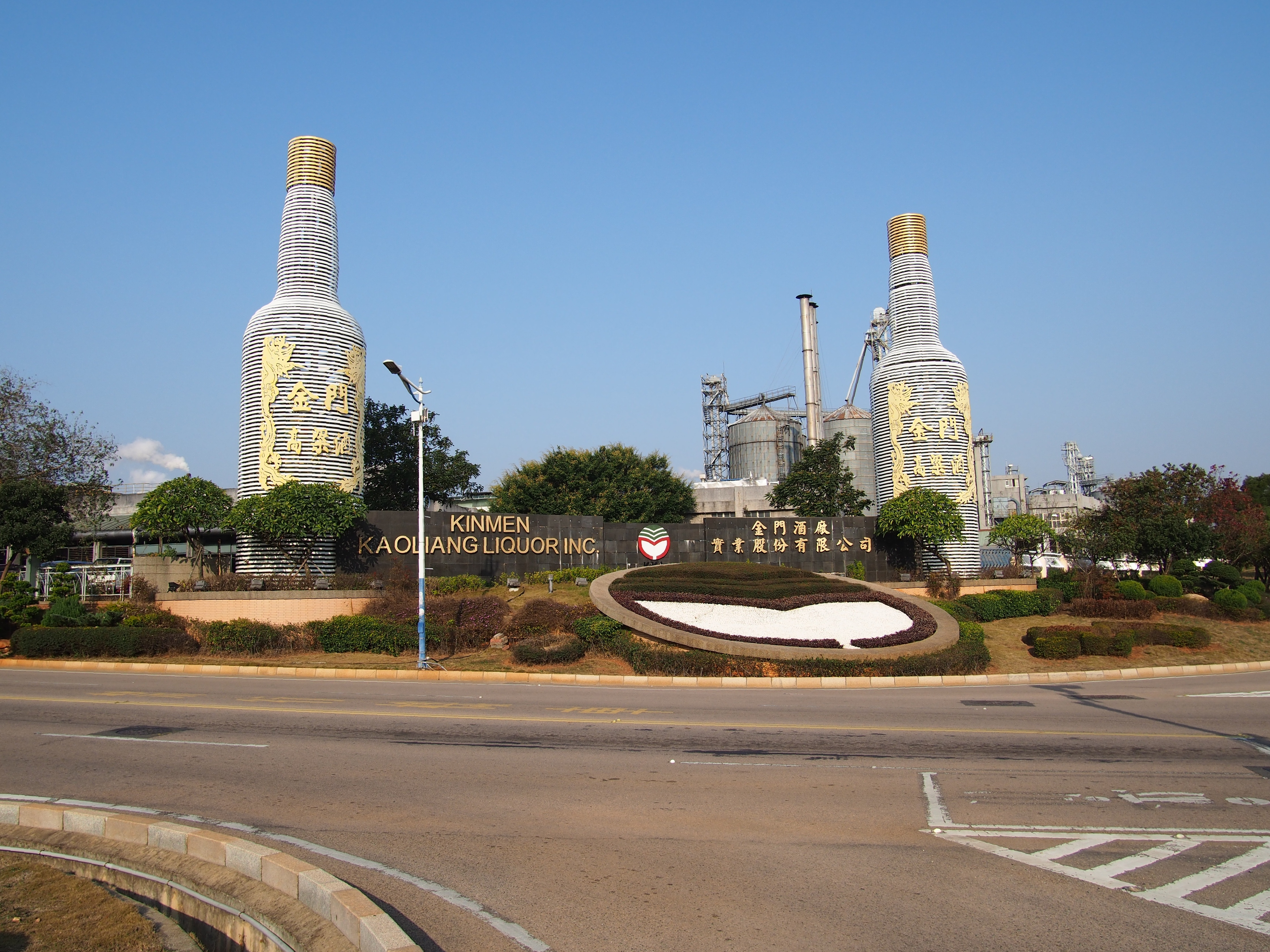
- Company type: Public-owned
- Industry: Distillery
- Predecessor: Affiliated Distillery, Kinmen Economy Control Division
- Founded: 1 July 2002; 23 years ago as company 3 September 1952; 73 years ago as government subsidiary
- Founders: Hu Lien
- Headquarters: Kinmen, Taiwan
- Key people: Yeh Hua-cheng (葉華成)
- Products: Kaoliang wine
- Owner: Kinmen County Government
- Website: www.kkl.com.tw

Kinmen Kaoliang Liquor Inc., also known as Kinmen Distillery, KKL, is a distillery in Kinmen County, Taiwan and owned by Kinmen County Government. The distillery is known for its Kinmen Kaoliang Liquor, and provides good tax income for the local government. The company also runs a basketball team, the Kinmen Kaoliang Liquor Basketball, in the Super Basketball League of Taiwan.

== History ==
Yeh Hua-cheng (葉華成) opened Jincheng Distillery in 1950 to make Kaoliang in Kinmen. The next year, 1951, Commander Hu Lien in charge of the Kinmen Defense Command tasted Yeh's Kaoliang and thought it was great. At the time, Hu had to resolve financial issue of his forces, therefore this gave him an idea to open up a distillery for the Defense Command. Hu initially wanted to contract Yeh to produce the Kaoliang, but was turned down as Yeh thought he could not produce such an amount of liquor. Hu then decided to invited Yeh to become a technician in his distillery, but to no avail.

On 3 September 1952, Hu decided to use his authority and forcefully appoint Yeh as the Technical Section Manager for the Command's distillery, Affiliated Distillery of Kinmen Economy Control Division, at the same time confiscating Yeh's distillery and using it for his Affiliated Distillery. Hu also built a new factory for the distillery.

In 1954, the construction of the new factory was completed and named "Jiulong River Distillery" (九龍江酒廠). In 1956, with the relocation of Fujian Provincial Government to Taiwan, Jiulong River Distillery was renamed to Kinmen Distillery (金門酒廠). On Feb 16 1998, the government-owned company was founded, and Kinmen Distillery was no longer directly managed by the local government.
