= Valerii Postoyanov =

Russian sport shooter (1941–2018)

Valerii Postovanov
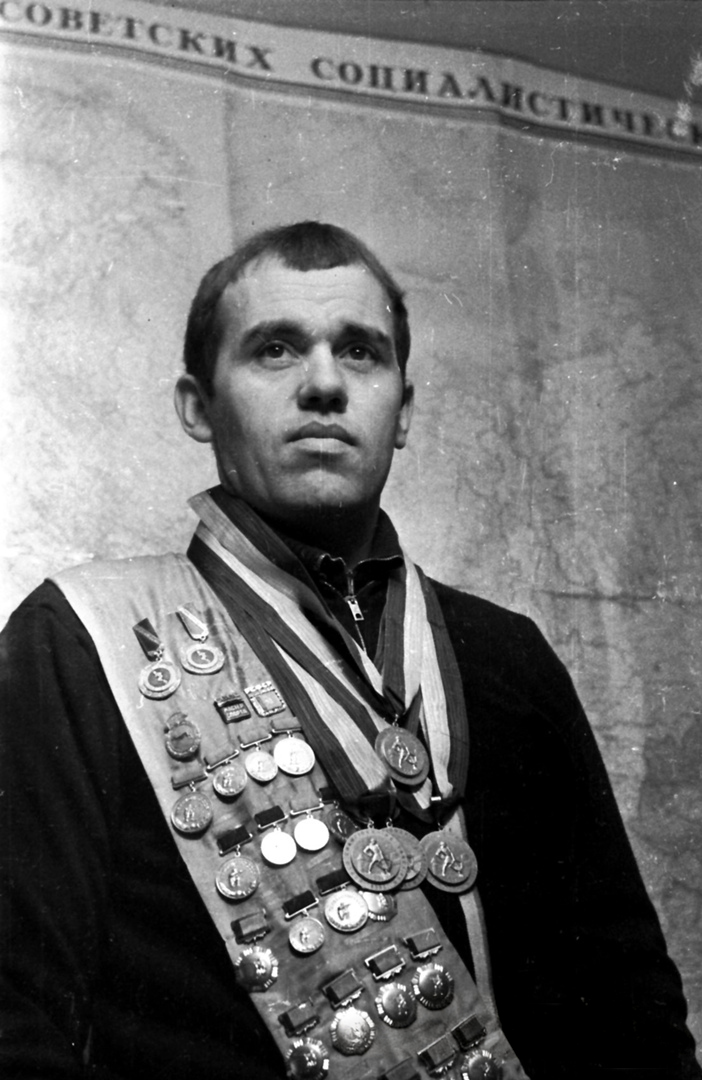

Personal information
- Native name: Валерий Иванович Постоя́нов
- Full name: Valerii Ivanovich Postoyanov
- Born: 11 October 1941; Irkutsk, RSFSR, USSR
- Died: 7 February 2018 (aged 76); Petrozavodsk, Russia

Sport
- Sport: Sports shooting

Valerii Ivanovich Postoyanov (11 October 1941 – 7 February 2018) was a Russian competitive rifleman. He was the winner of the Honored Master of Sports of the USSR in 1970. He competed in the 50 metre running target event at the 1972 Summer Olympics, where he finished in fourth place and two points shy of achieving a bronze medal.
