= Ion Dumitrescu =

Romanian sport shooter

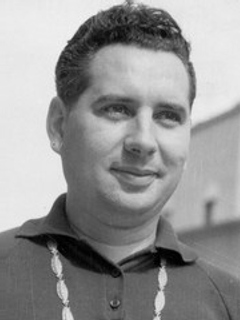
- Dumitrescu at the 1960 Olympics

Personal information
- Born: 18 July 1925 Bucharest, Romania
- Died: 1999 (aged 73–74)
- Height: 1.79 m (5 ft 10 in)
- Weight: 98 kg (216 lb)

Sport
- Sport: Shooting
- Club: Olympia
Medal record
Representing Romania
Olympic Games
Gold medal – first place	1960 Rome	Trap
World Championships
Bronze medal – third place	1958 Moscow	Team skeet
Bronze medal – third place	1961 Oslo	Trap

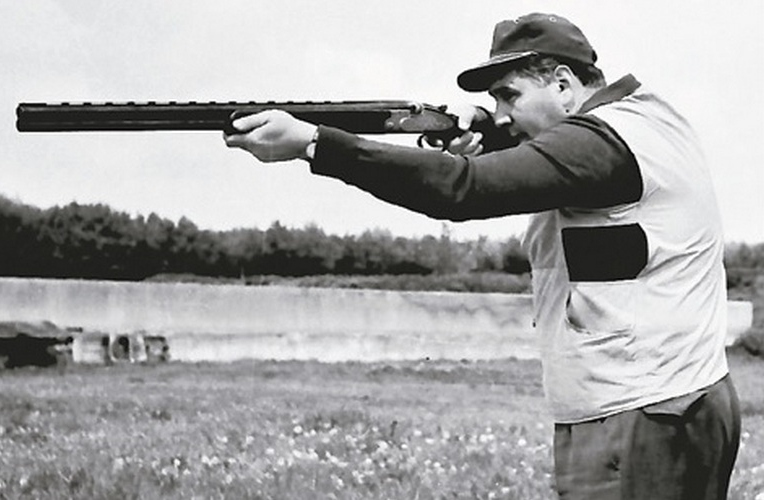
Dumitrescu at the 1960 Olympics

Ion Dumitrescu (18 July 1925 – 1999) was a Romanian sports shooter. He competed in the individual trap event at the 1960, 1964, 1968 and 1972 Olympics and placed 1st, 5th, 11th and 30th, respectively. At the world championships he won bronze medals in team skeet in 1958 and in individual trap in 1961.

Dumitrescu took up shooting in 1950. After retiring from competition has worked as a shooting instructor and served as a member of the Romanian Federation of Sport Shooting (Federatiei Romane de Tir Sportiv).
