= Eight Skilled Gentlemen =

Novel by Barry Hughart

- Author: Barry Hughart
- Language: English
- Series: Chronicles of Master Li and Number Ten Ox
- Subject: China -- Fiction
- Genre: Historical Fiction, Fantastic Fiction
- Publisher: Doubleday
- Publication date: 1991
- Publication place: USA
- Media type: Book
- Pages: 255
- ISBN: 0-385-41709-8
- OCLC: 22509949
- Dewey Decimal: 813/.54 20
- LC Class: PS3558.U347 E37 1991
- Preceded by: The Story of the Stone; Also published in omnibus edition: The Chronicles of Master Li and Number Ten Ox.

Eight Skilled Gentlemen is a novel by Barry Hughart, first published in 1990. It is the third, and final, part of a series set in a version of ancient China that began with Bridge of Birds and The Story of the Stone.

== Plot summary ==
In this novel, Li Kao and Number Ten Ox are attending the execution of a notorious criminal (about whose capture the less said the better, according to the chronicler) when into the public square bounds a "vampire ghoul" who soon meets a fiery demise. Master Li is given the case by the "Celestial Master" who soon becomes a main suspect. The plot involves everything from a conspiracy involving fake tea to dog-brides, puppeteers to magic birdcages, assorted pre-Chinese demons and gods, and the hooded and ancient Eight Skilled Gentlemen.

The plot also involves a subject rarely mentioned in fiction, the pre-Chinese aborigines and their gods.

== Reviews ==
The Washington Post called this book "a refreshing change from the dull and endless parade of Celtic myth that dominates the fantasy marketplace." They compare his writing to Ernest Bramah's Kai Lung novels and Robert van Gulik's Judge Dee mysteries.

School Library Journal states "This is a mystery story for those who don't read mysteries, a fantasy novel for people who don't read fantasy, and a good time for anyone."

Publishers Weekly described the book as "Superbly written and narrated in the humorously observant voice of Number Ten Ox, this is a book not to be missed."
