= Barry Hughart =

American fantasy novelist and screenwriter (1934–2019)

- Born: March 13, 1934; Peoria, Illinois
- Died: August 1, 2019 (aged 85)
- Occupation: Novelist
- Writing career
- Period: 1984–1990
- Genres: Fantasy, Chinoiserie

Barry Hughart (March 13, 1934 – August 1, 2019) was an American author of fantasy novels.

== Background ==
Hughart was born in Peoria, Illinois on March 13, 1934. His father, John Harding Page, served as a naval officer. His mother, Veronica Hughart, was an architect.

Hughart was educated at Phillips Academy (Andover). After graduating from high school, he had undiagnosed depression, which was classified at the time as schizophrenia, and was treated in the Kings County Psychiatric Ward. Following his release he attended Columbia University, where he obtained a bachelor's degree in 1956.

Upon his graduation from Columbia, Hughart joined the United States Air Force and served from 1956 to 1960 where he was involved in laying mines in the Korean Demilitarized Zone. During Hughart's military service he began to develop his lifelong interest in China that led him to plan a series set in "an Ancient China that never was". His connection to China continued after his military service, as he worked with TechTop, a military surplus company that was based in Asia, from 1960 to 1965.

From 1965 to 1970 Hughart was the manager of the Lenox Hill Book Shop in New York City.

== Writing ==
Barry Hughart's writing career started with his novel Bridge of Birds, published in 1984, which won the 1985 World Fantasy Award for best novel and also won the Mythopoeic Fantasy Award in 1986, followed by The Story of the Stone in 1988 and Eight Skilled Gentlemen in 1990. He intended to write seven novels about the adventures of Li Kao and Number Ten Ox, but his writing career was cut short due to issues with his publishers. After his last published novel, Hughart reportedly stopped writing. Hughart cites Alexandre Dumas, Robert Louis Stevenson, and Mark Twain as major influences in his work. Romance of the Three Kingdoms and The Arabian Nights are two major works he also states as affecting his own writing.

=== The Chronicles of Master Li and Number Ten Ox ===
The Chronicles of Master Li and Number Ten Ox is a series of three books about Li Kao, an ancient sage and scholar with "a slight flaw in his character", and his client, later assistant, the immensely strong peasant Number Ten Ox, who narrates the story. The series blends Chinese mythology—authentic and imagined, from several eras—with detective fiction and a gentle, ironic humour. The first book Bridge of Birds was published in 1984, the title derived from "The Cowherd and the Weaver Girl" myth. It was followed in 1988 by The Story of the Stone and in 1990 by Eight Skilled Gentlemen. No further books followed, although Hughart had planned a series of seven novels. In the last of these, Li Kao and Number Ten Ox would die facing the Great White Serpent (a conflict alluded to in Bridge of Birds). They would then become minor celestial deities who would continue to cause problems for the August Personage of Jade. An omnibus edition, The Chronicles of Master Li and Number Ten Ox was first published in 1998 by The Stars Our Destination Books in both hardback and trade paperback. It was illustrated by Kaja Foglio.

==== Bridge of Birds (1984) ====
The first novel in the series, Bridge of Birds, received the 1986 Mythopoeic Award for Best Fantasy Novel and tied for the 1985 World Fantasy Award for Best Novel. It has been translated into at least six different languages: Bulgarian; French; German; Hebrew; Japanese; and Spanish. Hughart considered the first draft of the book as completely "wrong" and set it aside for many years. His inspiration for finishing the book came about after reading The Importance of Understanding by Lin Yutang. Hughart stated that he realized his first version was about "monsters and marvels and mayhem" and that "the book hadn't really been about anything". When he decided to continue working on the book he made "love" the central theme of the story.

==== The Story of the Stone (1988) ====
The second book of the series. Master Li and Number Ten Ox set out on another adventure after the killing of a monk, to find out his murderer and to find a stolen manuscript from his library. The Story of the Stone takes place in the Valley of the Sorrows where they set out to find the Laughing Prince, the murder suspect.

==== Eight Skilled Gentlemen (1990) ====
The third book of the series, Eight Skilled Gentlemen, is the final adventure of Master Li and Number Ten Ox.

=== Publication issues ===
In an interview in 2000 Hughart blamed the end of the Master Li and Number Ten Ox series on unsympathetic and incompetent publishers. The style of his books made them difficult to classify and he felt his market was restricted by the decision to sell only to SF/fantasy outlets. As an example of publisher incompetence, Hughart notes that his publishers did not notify him of the awards given Bridge of Birds. He also points out that The Story of the Stone was published three months ahead of schedule, so that no purchasable copies were available by the time the scheduled reviews finally appeared; finally, the paperback edition of Eight Skilled Gentlemen was published simultaneously with the hardback edition resulting in few sales of the latter. When his publishers then refused to publish hardback editions of any future books, Hughart stated that he found it impossible to afford to continue writing novels, which brought the series to an end. Later in 2008, Hughart wrote

Will there be more? I doubt it, and it's not because of bad sales and worse publishers. It's simply that I'd taken it as far as I could. ... [N]o matter how well I wrote I'd just be repeating myself.

=== Style ===
Barry Hughart's style has been considered difficult to classify. Hughart uses a "faux-oriental style" with "long alliterations, poetic hyperboles, and casual references to Chinese culture" and lighthearted humor.

=== Themes ===
Reviewers identify many themes in Hughart's writing, from mystery, Chinese myths, humor, and thrill, to potions, magic plants, ghosts, and spells. Bridge of Birds is as much a fantasy as a mystery, a long complex journey. Hughart imagined his own China with its own unique history, and each novel in his series builds upon the others. Hughart drew on numerous sources to create the Chinese mythology of Bridge of Birds.

=== Films ===
Hughart also wrote dialogue for the following films:

- Devil's Bride (1968)
- Honeymoon with a Stranger (1969)
- Man on the Move (Jigsaw) (1972)
- Welcome Home, Johnny Bristol (1972)
- The Other Side of Hell (1978)
- Special Effects (1984)
- Snow Job (1983–1985)
- When the Bough Breaks (1986)

== Death ==
A small note was posted to barryhughart.org stating "It has been confirmed as of 1-Aug-2019 that Mr. Hughart has passed on." Locus magazine also published a brief obituary indicating his date of death as 1 August 2019.
