= Shooting at the 1988 Summer Olympics – Mixed trap =

Sports shooting at the Olympics

Trap at the Games of the XXIV Olympiad
- Shooting pictogram
- Venue: Taereung International Shooting Range
- Date: 20 September 1988
- Competitors: 49 from 28 nations
- Winning score: 222 OR

Medalists
1st place, gold medalist(s)		Dmitry Monakov	Soviet Union
2nd place, silver medalist(s)		Miloslav Bednařík	Czechoslovakia
3rd place, bronze medalist(s)		Frans Peeters	Belgium

Trap was one of the thirteen shooting events at the 1988 Summer Olympics. It was held on 20 September 1988 at the Taereung International Shooting Range. There were 49 competitors from 28 nations, with each nation having up to four shooters (up from two per nation in prior editions). The event was decided by a shoot-off between Dmitry Monakov of the Soviet Union and Miloslav Bednařík of Czechoslovakia, with Monakov emerging as the winner with 8–7. Frans Peeters of Belgium took bronze after a three-way shoot-off. Monakov's victory was the first gold medal for the Soviet Union in the trap; Czechoslovakia and Belgium each received their first medal in the event as well. Italy's four-Games medal streak ended.

== Background ==
This was the 15th appearance of the men's ISSF Olympic trap event. The event was held at every Summer Olympics from 1896 to 1924 (except 1904, when no shooting events were held) and from 1952 to 2016. As with most shooting events, it was nominally open to women from 1968 to 1980; the trap remained open to women through 1992. Very few women participated these years. The event returned to being men-only for 1996, though the new double trap had separate events for men and women that year. In 2000, a separate women's event was added and it has been contested at every Games since. There was also a men's team trap event held four times from 1908 to 1924.

Six of the top 10 shooters from the 1984 Games, including all three medalists, returned: two-time gold medalist Luciano Giovannetti of Italy, silver medalist Francisco Boza of Peru, bronze medalist Daniel Carlisle of the United States, fourth-place finisher Timo Nieminen of Finland, eighth-place finisher Johnny Påhlsson of Sweden, and ninth-place finisher Sherif Saleh of Egypt. The favorites in the event were the last two World Champions, Miloslav Bednařík of Czechoslovakia (1985 and 1986) and Dmitry Monakov of the Soviet Union (1987).

The People's Republic of China and Saudi Arabia each made their debut in the event. Great Britain made its 14th appearance, most among nations, having missed only the 1980 Moscow Games.

== Competition format ==
For the first time since 1956, the trap competition consisted of multiple rounds. The total for finalists also increased, from 200 to 225.

The qualifying round consisted of six series of 25 shots (150 total). The top 24 shooters advanced to the semifinal. The semifinal featured an additional two series of 25 shots (50 total for the semifinal), with the score added to the qualifying round score for a 200-target semifinal total. The top 6 shooters at that point moved on to the final. One additional series of 25 targets was used for the final, with a total score out of 225. Shoot-offs were used as necessary to break ties for medals.

== Records ==
Prior to this competition, the existing world and Olympic records were as follows.

World record	
Olympic record	New format

Dmitry Monakov and Miloslav Bednařík set the initial 225-target Olympic record at 222.

== Schedule ==
All times are Korea Standard Time adjusted for daylight savings (UTC+10)

Date	Time	Round
Tuesday, 20 September 1988	14:00	Qualifying; Semifinal; Final

== Results ==
=== Qualifying round ===
Rank	Shooter	Nation	Score	Notes
1	Dmitry Monakov	Soviet Union	149	Q
2	Miloslav Bednařík	Czechoslovakia	148	Q
3	Bean van Limbeek	Netherlands	148	Q
4	Frans Peeters	Belgium	147	Q
5	Francisco Boza	Peru	147	Q
6	Kazumi Watanabe	Japan	147	Q
7	Arimatti Nummela	Finland	147	Q
8	Daniel Carlisle	United States	147	Q
9	Urmas Saaliste	Soviet Union	146	Q
10	Albano Pera	Italy	145	Q
11	Eladio Vallduvi	Spain	145	Q
12	John Maxwell	Australia	145	Q
13	Rafael Axpe	Spain	145	Q
14	Christophe Guelpa	France	144	Q
15	Russell Mark	Australia	144	Q
16	Daniele Cioni	Italy	144	Q
17	Brian Ballard	United States	144	Q
18	Jose Bladas	Spain	144	Q
19	Park Chul-sung	South Korea	144	Q
20	John Primrose	Canada	143	Q
21	Jörg Damme	East Germany	143	Q
22	Luciano Giovannetti	Italy	143	Q
23	George Haas III	United States	143	Q
24	João Rebelo	Portugal	143	Q
25	Kim Kon-il	South Korea	142	
25	Aleksandr Lavrinenko	Soviet Union	142	
25	Johnny Påhlsson	Sweden	142	
25	Ian Peel	Great Britain	142	
25	Sherif Saleh	Egypt	142	
30	Byun Kyung-soo	South Korea	141	
30	Peter Aagaard Jensen	Denmark	141	
30	Susan Nattrass	Canada	141	
33	Gian Nicola Berti	San Marino	140	
33	George Leary	Canada	140	
33	Gemma Usieto	Spain	140	
33	Alfredo Valentini	San Marino	140	
37	Hélder Cavaco	Portugal	139	
37	Domingo Diaz	Australia	139	
39	Alfredo Cuentas	Mexico	138	
40	Rodrigo Bastos	Brazil	137	
40	Gao E	China	137	
42	Luis Garrido	Puerto Rico	136	
43	Zoltán Bodó	Hungary	135	
43	Timo Nieminen	Finland	135	
43	Zhang Bing	China	135	
46	Pia Lucia Baldisserri	Italy	134	
47	Carolyn Koch	United States	130	
48	Matar Al Harthi	Saudi Arabia	128	
49	Rodney Tudor-Cole	Zimbabwe	125	

=== Semifinal ===
Rank	Shooter	Nation	Qual	1	2	Semifinal	Total	Notes
1	Dmitry Monakov	Soviet Union	149	23	25	48	197	Q
2	Miloslav Bednařík	Czechoslovakia	148	25	24	49	197	Q
3	Frans Peeters	Belgium	147	23	25	48	195	Q
4	Francisco Boza	Peru	147	?	?	48	195	Q
5	Kazumi Watanabe	Japan	147	25	23	48	195	Q
6	Bean van Limbeek	Netherlands	148	24	23	47	195	Q
7	Urmas Saaliste	Soviet Union	146	24	24	48	194	
8	Arimatti Nummela	Finland	147	23	24	47	194	
9	Daniel Carlisle	United States	147	24	23	47	194	
10	Albano Pera	Italy	145	24	24	48	193	
11	Rafael Axpe	Spain	145	25	23	48	193	
12	Brian Ballard	United States	144	24	24	48	192	
12	George Haas III	United States	143	25	24	49	192	
12	Eladio Vallduvi	Spain	145	25	22	47	192	
15	Jörg Damme	East Germany	143	24	24	48	191	
15	Russell Mark	Australia	144	24	23	47	191	
15	Park Chul-sung	South Korea	144	23	24	47	191	
18	Jose Bladas	Spain	144	23	23	46	190	
18	Luciano Giovannetti	Italy	143	24	23	47	190	
18	John Primrose	Canada	143	24	23	47	190	
18	João Rebelo	Portugal	143	24	23	47	190	
22	Christophe Guelpa	France	144	22	23	45	189	
22	John Maxwell	Australia	145	22	22	44	189	
24	Daniele Cioni	Italy	144	24	20	44	188	

=== Final ===
Rank	Shooter	Nation	Qual+SF	Final	Total	Bronze shoot-off	Gold shoot-off	Notes
1st place, gold medalist(s)	Dmitry Monakov	Soviet Union	197	25	222	—N/a	8	OR
2nd place, silver medalist(s)	Miloslav Bednařík	Czechoslovakia	197	25	222	—N/a	7	OR
3rd place, bronze medalist(s)	Frans Peeters	Belgium	195	24	219	16	—N/a	
4	Francisco Boza	Peru	195	24	219	15	—N/a	
5	Bean van Limbeek	Netherlands	195	24	219	7	—N/a	
6	Kazumi Watanabe	Japan	195	21	216	—N/a		

== Sources ==
- XXIVth Olympiad Seoul 1988 Official Report – Volume 2 Part 2 (PDF).
