= Shooting at the 1992 Summer Olympics – Mixed trap =

Trap at the Games of the XXV Olympiad
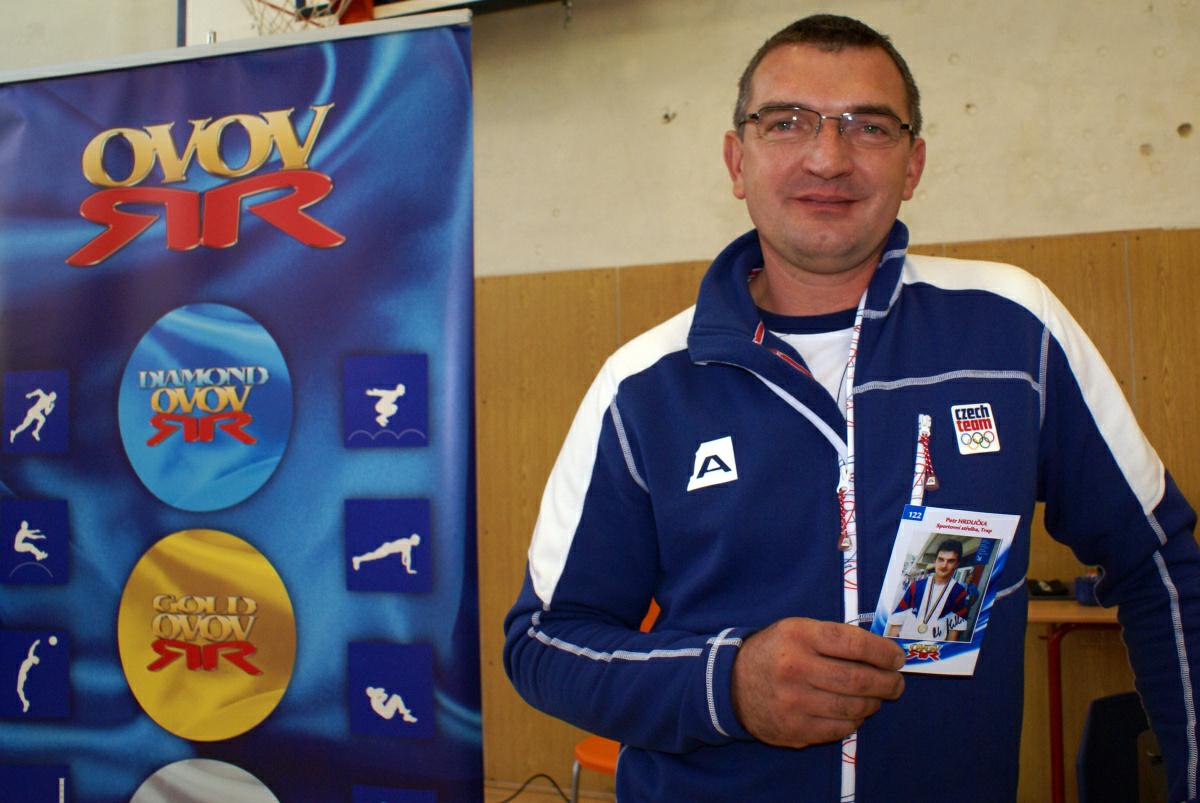
- Gold medalist Petr Hrdlička (2012)
- Venue: Mollet del Vallès
- Dates: 31 July – 2 August 1992
- Competitors: 54 from 36 nations
- Winning score: 219

Medalists
1st place, gold medalist(s)		Petr Hrdlička	Czechoslovakia
2nd place, silver medalist(s)		Kazumi Watanabe	Japan
3rd place, bronze medalist(s)		Marco Venturini	Italy

Trap was one of the thirteen shooting events at the 1992 Summer Olympics. It was the last Olympic trap competition open to both men and women. It was held from 31 July to 2 August 1992 at the Mollet del Vallès. There were 54 competitors from 36 nations, with each nation having up to 3 shooters. The competition consisted of a qualification round of 150 targets, a semifinal of 50 targets for the top 24 competitors, and a final of 25 targets for the top six. Petr Hrdlička and Kazumi Watanabe both hit 219 of the 225 targets, with Hrdlička winning the gold medal shoot-off. One hit behind, another shoot-off determined the bronze medalist, with Marco Venturini defeating Jörg Damme. Hrdlička's victory was the first gold medal for Czechoslovakia in the trap, shortly after the nation won its first medal in the event (silver in 1988). Watanabe's silver was Japan's first medal in the trap. Venturini put Italy back on the podium after a one-Games absence in 1988 broke a four-Games medal streak in the event.

== Background ==
This was the 16th appearance of the men's ISSF Olympic trap event. The event was held at every Summer Olympics from 1896 to 1924 (except 1904, when no shooting events were held) and from 1952 to 2016. As with most shooting events, it was nominally open to women from 1968 to 1980; the trap remained open to women through 1992. Very few women participated these years. The event returned to being men-only for 1996, though the new double trap had separate events for men and women that year. In 2000, a separate women's event was added and it has been contested at every Games since. There was also a men's team trap event held four times from 1908 to 1924.

Three of the 6 finalists from the 1988 Games returned: bronze medalist Frans Peeters of Belgium, fourth-place finisher Francisco Boza of Peru, and sixth-place finisher Kazumi Watanabe of Japan. Favourites in the event included Marco Venturini of Italy (World Champion in 1989 and 1991) and Jörg Damme of Germany (World Champion in 1990). Other World Championship medalists competing were Daniele Cioni of Italy (silver in 1990) and Michael Diamond of Australia (silver in 1991).

Croatia, Estonia, Kuwait, and the Netherlands Antilles each made their debut in the event; twelve former Soviet republics competed together as the Unified Team. Great Britain made its 15th appearance, most among nations, having missed only the boycotted 1980 Moscow Games.

== Competition format ==
The competition used the three-round, 225-target total format introduced in 1988. The qualification round consisted of six series of 25 shots (150 total). The top 24 shooters advanced to the semifinal. The semifinal featured an additional two series of 25 shots (50 total for the semifinal), with the score added to the qualification round score for a 200-target semifinal total. The top 6 shooters at that point moved on to the final. One additional series of 25 targets was used for the final, with a total score out of 225. Shoot-offs were used as necessary to break ties for medals.

== Records ==
Prior to this competition, the existing world and Olympic records were as follows.

World record				
Olympic record	Dmitry Monakov (URS); Miloslav Bednařík (TCH)	222	Seoul, South Korea	20 September 1988

No new world or Olympic records were set during the competition.

== Schedule ==
After the 1988 Games used a one-day format, the 1992 competition returned to a three-day event.

All times are Central European Summer Time (UTC+2)

Date	Time	Round
Friday, 31 July 1992; Saturday, 1 August 1992	9:00	Qualifying round
Sunday, 2 August 1992	9:00	Semifinal; Final

== Results ==
=== Qualifying round ===
Rank	Shooter	Nation	Score	Notes
1	Kazumi Watanabe	Japan	148	Q
2	Jörg Damme	Germany	148	Q
3	Jay Waldron	United States	147	Q
4	Pavel Kubec	Czechoslovakia	147	Q
5	Michael Diamond	Australia	147	Q
6	Manuel Silva	Portugal	146	Q
7	Zhang Bing	China	146	Q
8	Marco Venturini	Italy	146	Q
9	Petr Hrdlička	Czechoslovakia	146	Q
10	João Rebelo	Portugal	145	Q
11	Giovanni Pellielo	Italy	145	Q
12	Jean-Paul Gros	France	145	Q
13	Bret Erickson	United States	145	Q
14	Antonio Palminha	Portugal	145	Q
15	Frans Peeters	Belgium	144	Q
16	Aleksandr Lavrinenko	Unified Team	144	Q
17	José Bladas Torras	Spain	144	Q
18	Russell Mark	Australia	144	Q
19	George Leary	Canada	143	Q
20	Daniele Cioni	Italy	143	Q
21	Muriel Bernard	France	143	Q
22	Aleksandr Assanov	Unified Team	143	Q
23	Susan Nattrass	Canada	142	Q
24	Francesco Amici	San Marino	142	Q
25	Zoltan Bodo	Hungary	141	
25	Francisco Boza	Peru	141	
25	Kevin Gill	Great Britain	141	
25	Alp Kizilsu	Turkey	141	
29	Fehaid Al Deehani	Kuwait	140	
29	Joan Besoli	Andorra	140	
29	James Graves	United States	140	
29	Michel Think	Luxembourg	140	
33	Rafael Axpe Elejalde	Spain	139	
33	Ivan Derevsky	Unified Team	139	
33	Demetris Lordos	Cyprus	139	
33	John Primrose	Canada	139	
33	Sherif Saleh	Egypt	139	
33	Željko Vadić	Croatia	139	
39	Thomas Knutsson	Sweden	137	
39	Horace Micallef	Malta	137	
39	István Putz	Hungary	137	
39	Urmas Saaliste	Estonia	137	
39	Zhang Yongjie	China	137	
44	Ari Nummela	Finland	136	
44	Gema Usieto Blázquez	Spain	136	
46	Xavier Bouvier	Switzerland	135	
46	Kim Kun-il	South Korea	135	
48	Chng Seng Mok	Singapore	134	
49	Jaime Recio	Philippines	133	
50	Jesús Tirado	Puerto Rico	132	
51	César Ortíz	Mexico	130	
52	Corné Bornman	South Africa	127	
52	Tarek Sabet	Egypt	127	
54	Michel Daou	Netherlands Antilles	118	

=== Semifinal ===
Rank	Shooter	Nation	Qual	Semifinal	Total	Notes
1	Pavel Kubec	Czechoslovakia	147	49	196	Q
2	Petr Hrdlička	Czechoslovakia	146	49	195	Q
3	Kazumi Watanabe	Japan	148	47	195	Q
4	Marco Venturini	Italy	146	49	195	Q
5	Jay Waldron	United States	147	48	195	Q
6	Jörg Damme	Germany	148	47	195	Q
7	José Bladas Torras	Spain	144	50	194	
8	Zhang Bing	China	146	48	194	
9	Russell Mark	Australia	144	49	193	
10	Giovanni Pellielo	Italy	145	48	193	
11	Michael Diamond	Australia	147	46	193	
11	Antonio Palminha	Portugal	145	48	193	
11	Manuel Silva	Portugal	146	47	193	
14	Daniele Cioni	Italy	143	49	192	
14	Frans Peeters	Belgium	144	48	192	
16	Bret Erickson	United States	145	46	191	
16	Jean-Paul Gros	France	145	46	191	
16	Aleksandr Lavrinenko	Unified Team	144	47	191	
16	George Leary	Canada	143	48	191	
16	João Rebelo	Portugal	145	46	191	
21	Francesco Amici	San Marino	142	46	188	
21	Aleksandr Assanov	Unified Team	143	45	188	
21	Muriel Bernard	France	143	45	188	
21	Susan Nattrass	Canada	142	46	188	

=== Final ===
Rank	Shooter	Nation	Qual+SF	Final	Total	Bronze shoot-off	Gold shoot-off
1st place, gold medalist(s)	Petr Hrdlička	Czechoslovakia	195	24	219	—N/a	1
2nd place, silver medalist(s)	Kazumi Watanabe	Japan	195	24	219	—N/a	0
3rd place, bronze medalist(s)	Marco Venturini	Italy	195	23	218	9	—N/a
4	Jörg Damme	Germany	195	23	218	8	—N/a
5	Pavel Kubec	Czechoslovakia	196	22	218	—N/a	
6	Jay Waldron	United States	195	22	217	—N/a	

== Sources ==
- Games of the XXV Olympiad Barcelona 1992: The results (PDF).
