= Timeline of the British Columbia Legislature raids =

The timeline of the British Columbia Legislature raids is the series of key dates associated with the investigation, trial and political outcomes related to the British Columbia Legislature raids.

The public first became aware of the issue on December 28, 2003, when television cameras recorded "a shocking raid" by police officers into the legislative buildings of the provincial government of British Columbia (BC), Canada. Images of officers of the Royal Canadian Mounted Police (RCMP) and Victoria Police Department hauling boxes of evidence were widely broadcast. The offices searched belonged to Dave Basi and Bob Virk, ministerial assistants to two cabinet ministers. The main criminal trial ended in October 2010 with Virk and Basi pleading guilty to breach of trust. Public questions and controversies continue about payment of $6 million by government to cover their legal fees and whether more people were involved in the corruption activities.

== Lead-up to the raid ==
- Summer 2002: Victoria police and RCMP launch an investigation (project Everywhichway) involving drugs and organized crime. The probe centres on allegations of cocaine being shipped from Victoria and sold in Toronto.
- May 13, 2003, British Columbia Premier Gordon Campbell announced that the government would sell the operations of BC Rail (including all of the assets other than the rail right-of-way). Not selling the railway had been a specific campaign promise in the previous election. Campbell maintained that he was keeping this promise, by proposing to retain ownership of the right-of-way and only leasing the land to the operator.
- Fall 2003: Nine people are arrested in Toronto, Vancouver, and Victoria as part of the investigation into the cocaine conspiracy. During the Everywhichway investigation, wiretapped conversations led police to investigate potential influence peddling by non-elected political appointees in government. Police are given court approval to monitor the e-mails and phones of two ministerial assistants in their government offices. The police have been clear in stating that no politicians were ever suspected of wrongdoing. At one point, police inadvertently listened to a phone conversation between the finance minister and Premier Gordon Campbell.
- Nov. 25, 2003, it was announced that Canadian National's (CN) bid of $1 billion had won the competition for BC Rail. The bid was accepted over those of several other companies, including OmniTrax. The transaction was closed on July 15, 2004.
- Dec. 1, 2003 - BC Attorney General Geoff Plant is advised by ministry staff that a case requires the appointment of a special prosecutor and may involve a search of the BC legislature.
- Dec. 9, 2003 - Police find $30,000 in suspected drug money during a search of the house in Saanich of Mandeep Singh Sandhu. His cousin Rob Dosanjh, a Victoria police officer, will be convicted in 2006 based on wiretap evidence of encouraging Sandhu to lie to police about the source of the money.
- Dec. 11, 2003 - William Berardino is appointed special prosecutor to oversee an investigation involving Victoria police officer Dosanjh and non-elected appointees at the legislature. In accordance with established practice, very few people in the senior levels of provincial government are informed of the appointment or know about the investigation.
- Dec. 12, 2003 - RCMP conduct a video surveillance of senior executives of OmniTRAX—one of three bidders for BC Rail, the province's railway company—as they dine with Finance Minister Gary Collins.
- Dec. 27, 2003 - BC Solicitor General Rich Coleman calls Premier of British Columbia Gordon Campbell, who is on vacation in Hawaii. Coleman tells the premier, the highest provincial political office, to expect an important call in the next days but does not give further details.
- Dec. 28, 2003 - Television cameras record "a shocking raid" by police officers into the legislative buildings of the provincial government of British Columbia (BC), Canada. Images of officers of the Royal Canadian Mounted Police and Victoria Police Department hauling boxes of evidence are widely broadcast. The offices searched belonged to Dave Basi, ministerial assistant to then-finance minister Gary Collins and Bob Virk, assistant to then-transportation minister Judith Reid.
- Also on the same day, Dec. 28, 2003, police searched three other locations:
  - the home of Bruce Clark, chief BC fundraiser for the federal Liberal Party of Canada, and brother to then-deputy premier Christy Clark;
  - the Victoria office of Pilothouse Communications director Brian Kieran;
  - the Vancouver office of the other Pilothouse director, Erik Bornmann, who at the time was communications director for the BC chapter of the federal Liberal Party of Canada.
- Dec. 29, 2003 - Dave Basi is fired from his job as ministerial assistant to B.C. Finance Minister Gary Collins. Virk is suspended with pay and is later terminated.
- Dec. 30, 2003 - Prime Minister of Canada Paul Martin states that people with links to the investigation, including Bornmann, will not be removed from their positions within the federal Liberal Party of Canada.

== 2004 ==
- Jan. 8, 2004 - News media first publicize that the raids may also be connected to the BC government's plans to privatize BC Rail.
- March 2, 2004 - In response to requests by news media to access the original search warrants, Associate Chief Justice Patrick Dohm of the Supreme Court of British Columbia releases a summary of the search warrants, which says police were investigating whether two government officials leaked information about the sale of BC Rail for their personal gain.
- Sept. 10, 2004 - Associate Chief Justice Patrick Dohm orders the release of additional court documents that allege two BC Liberal aides released confidential information about a government deal to privatize a portion of BC Rail in exchange for a job with the federal government.
- Sept. 15, 2004 - Drug charges laid against Basi and seven others.
- Dec. 21, 2004 - Dave Basi and Virk charged with accepting bribes, influence peddling, breach of trust and fraud. Aneal Basi charged with money laundering. Aneal Basi is Dave Basi's cousin and was also a government employee in communications.
- 2004 - The Ministry of Transportation cancels the sale of the Roberts Bank Superport Subdivision spur line (estimated worth $70 million) after RCMP inform the government the process was tainted after the B.C. legislature raid.

== 2005 ==
- June 2005: Dave Basi's drug charges stayed. He had been charged with the production and possession of marijuana after police found a grow operation in a home he owned but rented out at Shawnigan Lake, north of Victoria.

== 2006 ==
- March 31, 2006 - Additional charges filed against Dave Basi. The Crown alleges that Basi was paid $50,000 between January 2002 and September 2003 to help land developers get protected property removed from the Agricultural Land Reserve for the Sunriver Estates housing project in Sooke. The developers also face charges.
- December 2006 - Victoria police officer Ravinder (Rob) Singh Dosanjh is given a three-month conditional sentence on a charge of willfully attempting to obstruct justice. He was also ordered to perform 50 hours of community service and pay a fine of $100. Dosanjh had advised his cousin Mandeep Sandhu to lie to police about the source of $30,000 found in Sandhu's house in December 2003.

== 2007 ==
- Dec. 3, 2007 — Journalist and trial observer Bill Tieleman returns from the courtroom to discover his office has been broken into and materials related to the trial moved around.
- Dec. 6, 2007—BC Supreme Court Justice Elizabeth Bennett ruled against a pre-trial Crown request to exclude defence lawyers from an in-camera hearing on information involving a police informant. This decision would be appealed all the way to the nation's top court, the Supreme Court of Canada.

== 2008 ==
- July 10, 2008 - The Supreme Court of Canada, the nation's highest court, hears a Crown appeal (Regina v. Basi) of the decision to allow the defendants' lawyers to be present during a pre-trial hearing regarding disclosure of documents to the defence that involved a police informant. The BC Court of Appeal had previously split 2–1 in upholding the trial judge's decision.
- Jasmohan (Jas) Bains, convicted of charges related to cocaine. The police wiretap of Bains, a cousin of Dave Basi, in the original drug investigation had led them to investigate the legislature in 2003.

== 2009 ==
- May 12, 2009 - The provincial election does not produce a significant change in the province's political landscape. Voters return Premier Gordon Campbell's Liberals to power, the first time in 23 years a party has won three elections in a row.
- September 14, 2009 - Justice Elizabeth Bennett rules partially against the defendants' application for records of Patrick Kinsella, a BC Liberal Party "insider", who was contracted by BC Rail to provide communications and political advice.
- Nov. 19, 2009 - The Supreme Court of Canada delivers a unanimous verdict In Regina v. Basi weighing the rights of the defendants versus the privileges of an informant to protection.

== 2010 ==
- April 2010 - Associate Chief Justice Ann MacKenzie replaces Elizabeth Bennett as overseeing the Basi-Virk trial.
- May 2010 - In the wake of a resignation of a special prosecutor into allegations (unrelated to BC Legislature Raids) against then-Solicitor General Kash Heed, it is publicly revealed that the law firm of special prosecutor William Berardino also made political donations to Liberal election candidates. Berardino is listed as "principal officer" for two donations in 2005 by his then-law firm, which gave $500 to former attorney general Wally Oppal and $100 to the Liberals. Berardino told media these occurred after his appointment.
- May 17, 2010 - The trial begins in the Supreme Court of BC, more than six years after the initial police raid into the legislature buildings.
- June 2010 - Martyn Brown, Premier Campbell's longtime chief of staff, provides lengthy testimony as the trial's first witness, but then under defence team cross-examination says repeatedly on the stand he cannot recall any details asked of him.
- June 9, 2010 - All 12 jurors agree to continue, after being advised that the trial, originally expected to last six weeks, is now projected to run until the third week of April 2011.
- September 2010 - After a two-month summer break, the trial's second witness, BC Rail board member Brian Kenney, testifies that BC Rail recommended government sell the railway due to its unpayable debts and that defendant Bob Virk attended meetings to evaluate proposals from potential purchasers.
- October 18, 2010 - Basi and Virk surprise the public by pleading guilty to breach of trust. Both were sentenced to two years less a day in house arrest and 150 hours of community service. Basi was also fined $75,600, equal to the amount he admitted he was paid in exchange for the information. At the time of the plea bargain, only 2 of a possible 42 witnesses had testified. The trial was costing government about $15,000 each day for defence and prosecution counsel. Government projected an additional $2 million in defence costs if the trial ran its full course. The final cost to government of the Basi-Virk trial was $18.3 million.
- October 21, 2010 - Fraser-Nicola MLA Harry Lali goes public with concerns in the Indo-Canadian community that Basi and Virk were made political scapegoats due to racism.
- October 29, 2010 - Basi returned to court to face charges of breaching the conditions of his house arrest. This included assessment of making him wear electronic monitoring devices.

== 2013 ==
- January 2013 - B.C. Supreme Court Justice Robert Bauman decides that solicitor-client privilege should prevent Auditor General John Doyle from accessing government documents about the decision to pay the legal fees of the defendants.
- May 2013 - The election campaign of Adrian Dix, leader of the British Columbia New Democratic Party (NDP), made a promise to create a public inquiry into the scandal but still lost the provincial election to the governing BC Liberal Party.
- December 2013 - New Auditor General Ross Jones issued a report on 26 legal indemnity agreements by government, which concluded there was no political interference in the decision to compensate $6 million to Basi and Virk for their legal fees.

== 2014 ==
- June 2014 - The legislature's public accounts committee questioned the Office of the Auditor-General on how it conducted its audit and made its conclusions about the decision to pay the legal fees as part of the plea agreement with defendants Basi and Virk.
