= Shooting at the 1984 Summer Olympics – Mixed trap =

Mixed trap at the Games of the XXIII Olympiad
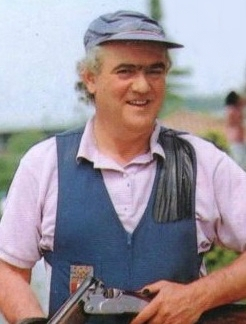
- Gold medalist Luciano Giovannetti (1987)
- Venue: Los Angeles, United States
- Dates: July 29–31, 1984
- Competitors: 70 from 42 nations
- Winning score: 192

Medalists
1st place, gold medalist(s)		Luciano Giovannetti	Italy
2nd place, silver medalist(s)		Francisco Boza	Peru
3rd place, bronze medalist(s)		Daniel Carlisle	United States

The trap was a shooting sports event held as part of the Shooting at the 1984 Summer Olympics programme. The competition was held between July 29 and 31, 1984 at the shooting ranges in Los Angeles. 70 shooters from 42 nations competed. Each nation was limited to two shooters. The event was won by Luciano Giovannetti of Italy, the first person to successfully defend an Olympic title in the trap. It was Italy's fifth victory in the event, most among nations. Giovannetti's win required winning a three-way shoot-off for the medal positions. Francisco Boza of Peru came second in that shoot-off, taking silver to earn Peru's first trap medal. Daniel Carlisle of the United States finished third for bronze.

== Background ==
This was the 14th appearance of the men's ISSF Olympic trap event. The event was held at every Summer Olympics from 1896 to 1924 (except 1904, when no shooting events were held) and from 1952 to 2016. As with most shooting events, it was nominally open to women from 1968 to 1980; the trap remained open to women through 1992. Very few women participated these years. The event returned to being men-only for 1996, though the new double trap had separate events for men and women that year. In 2000, a separate women's event was added and it has been contested at every Games since. There was also a men's team trap event held four times from 1908 to 1924.

Three of the top 10 shooters from the 1980 Games returned: gold medalist Luciano Giovannetti of Italy and the Spanish team, fifth-place finisher Eladio Vallduvi and tenth-place finisher Ricardo Sancho. Vallduvi and Giovannetti had split the World Championship in 1982. Reigning (1983) World Champion John Primrose of Canada also competed in Los Angeles, while 1981 winner Aleksandr Asanov of the Soviet Union could not enter due to the Soviet-led boycott.

Bahrain, Cyprus, Hong Kong, and Paraguay each made their debut in the event. Great Britain made its 13th appearance, most among nations, having missed only the 1980 Moscow Olympics.

== Competition format ==
The competition used the 200-target format introduced with the return of trap to the Olympics in 1952. Only a single round of shooting was done, with all shooters facing 200 targets. Shooting was done in 8 series of 25 targets. The first three series (75 shots) were on day 1, the next three (75 shots) on day 2, and the final two series (50 shots) on day 3. Shoot-offs of 25 shots were used as necessary to break ties for medals; ties for the rest of the top 10 places were broken by score in the 8th series (and, if necessary, 7th series and so on until the tie was broken).

== Records ==
Prior to this competition, the existing world and Olympic records were as follows.

World record	Angelo Scalzone (ITA)	199	Munich, West Germany	27–29 August 1972
Olympic record	Angelo Scalzone (ITA)	199	Munich, West Germany	27–29 August 1972

No new world or Olympic records were set during the competition.

== Schedule ==
Date	Time	Round
Sunday, 29 July 1984	9:00	Course 1
Monday, 30 July 1984	9:00	Course 2
Tuesday, 31 July 1984	9:00	Course 3

== Results ==
The three-way tie for the medals was broken with a 25-target shoot-off. Giovannetti, the defending champion, won with a score of 24. Boza hit 23, while Carlisle hit 22.

Rank	Shooter	Nation	Total
1st place, gold medalist(s)	Luciano Giovannetti	Italy	192
2nd place, silver medalist(s)	Francisco Boza	Peru	192
3rd place, bronze medalist(s)	Daniel Carlisle	United States	192
4	Timo Nieminen	Finland	191
5	Michel Carrega	France	190
6	Eli Ellis	Australia	190
7	Terry Rumbel	Australia	189
8	Johnny Påhlsson	Sweden	189
9	Sherif Saleh	Egypt	188
10	Marcos José Olsen	Brazil	188
11	Motoharu Hirano	Japan	186
11	Park Chul-sung	South Korea	186
11	Kazumi Watanabe	Japan	186
14T	Peter Boden	Great Britain	185
14T	Ludwig Puser	Austria	185
16	John Primrose	Canada	184
17	Pat Bawtinheimer	Canada	183
17	Peter Croft	Great Britain	183
17	Diego García	Mexico	183
17	Ricardo Sancho	Spain	183
21	Pablo Vergara	Chile	182
22	Jean Ané	France	181
22	Clive Conolly	Zimbabwe	181
22	Eladio Vallduvi	Spain	181
22	Walter Zobell	United States	181
26	Diego Arcay	Venezuela	180
26	Joan Tomàs Roca	Andorra	180
28	Peter Blecher	West Germany	179
28	José Faria	Portugal	179
28	Francesc Gaset Fris	Andorra	179
31	Daniele Cioni	Italy	178
31	Luciano Santolini	San Marino	178
33	Gilbert Duchateau	Belgium	177
33	Matti Nummela	Finland	177
35	José Artecona	Puerto Rico	176
35	Alp Kızılsu	Turkey	176
35	Dimitrios Papakhrisostomou	Cyprus	176
35	Mansher Singh	India	176
35	Randhir Singh	India	176
35	Étienne Vivier	Belgium	176
41	Guillermo Castellanos	Mexico	175
41	Cheng Shu Ming	Hong Kong	175
41	Choi Jeong-yong	South Korea	175
41	Leonel Martínez	Venezuela	175
45	Mohsen El-Sayed	Egypt	174
45	Damrong Pachonyut	Thailand	174
47	Anastasios Lordos	Cyprus	173
48	Raúl Abatte	Chile	172
48	Elio Gasperoni	San Marino	172
48	Michael Gauci	Malta	172
51	Frans Chetcuti	Malta	170
51	Jean Gemayel	Lebanon	170
53	Roy McGowan	Ireland	169
54	Michael Carr-Hartley	Kenya	168
54	João Rebelo	Portugal	168
56	Gustavo García	Colombia	167
57	Víctor Hugo Campos	Bolivia	166
57	Alonso Morales	Colombia	166
57	Elia Nasrallah	Lebanon	166
60	Ayser Al-Hyari	Jordan	164
60	Avelino Palma	Brazil	164
62	Javier Asbun	Bolivia	161
62	Jean-Marie Repaire	Monaco	161
64	Vudha Bhirombhakdi	Thailand	157
65	Irfan Adelbi	Jordan	149
66	Trevan Clough	Papua New Guinea	145
67	Olegario Farrés	Paraguay	144
68	Osvaldo Farrés	Paraguay	134
69	Julio González	El Salvador	124
70	Salman Al-Khalifa	Bahrain	76
