= Shooting at the 1996 Summer Olympics – Men's trap =

Men's trap at the Games of the XXVI Olympiad
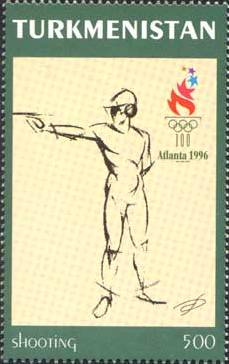
- Turkmenistan stamp commemorating shooting at the 1996 Olympics
- Venue: Wolf Creek Shooting Complex
- Dates: 20–21 July
- Competitors: 58 from 41 nations
- Winning score: 149 OR

Medalists
1st place, gold medalist(s)		Michael Diamond	Australia
2nd place, silver medalist(s)		Josh Lakatos	United States
3rd place, bronze medalist(s)		Lance Bade	United States

Men's trap shooting was one of the fifteen shooting events at the 1996 Summer Olympics. It was held on 20 and 21 July 1996 at the Wolf Creek Shooting Complex. There were 58 competitors from 41 nations, with each nation having up to three shooters. Michael Diamond of Australia won, setting two new Olympic records, ahead of two Americans. After the regular 150 targets, it took a marathon shoot-off to separate the silver and bronze medalists; after both shooters had hit 27 straight targets, Josh Lakatos hit his 28th while Lance Bade missed. It was the first medal in the men's trap for Australia; the United States had most recently been on the podium in the event in 1984.

== Background ==
This was the 17th appearance of the men's ISSF Olympic trap event. The event was held at every Summer Olympics from 1896 to 1924 (except 1904, when no shooting events were held) and from 1952 to 2016. As with most shooting events, it was nominally open to women from 1968 to 1980; the trap remained open to women through 1992. Very few women participated these years. The event returned to being men-only for 1996, though the new double trap had separate events for men and women that year. In 2000, a separate women's event was added and it has been contested at every Games since. There was also a men's team trap event held four times from 1908 to 1924.

Three of the 6 finalists from the 1992 Games returned: bronze medalist Marco Venturini of Italy, fourth-place finisher Jörg Damme of Germany, and fifth-place finisher Pavel Kubec of Czechoslovakia (now competing for the Czech Republic). Venturini had won his third World Championship in 1993. Dmitry Monakov, Olympic champion in 1988 for the Soviet Union, returned for Ukraine; he was the 1994 World Champion. The reigning (1995) World Champion was Giovanni Pellielo of Italy.

Angola, Chinese Taipei, the Czech Republic, New Zealand, North Korea, Slovakia, and Ukraine each made their debut in the event. Great Britain made its 16th appearance, most among nations, having missed only the 1980 Moscow Games.

== Competition format ==
The competition used a new, two-round format, dropping the three-round format from 1988 and 1992. The qualifying round was reduced to 125 targets (in 5 series of 25, held over two days with 3 series the first day and 2 series the second). The semifinal round was eliminated. The top six shooters advanced to the final. The final remained a single series of 25 targets; the total score over all 6 series (150 targets) determined the winner. Shoot-offs were used as necessary to break ties for qualifying for the final and in the final.

== Records ==
Prior to this competition, the existing world and Olympic records were as follows.

World record	
Olympic record	New format

Michael Diamond set the initial Olympic records for the qualifying round (125-target) at 124 and for the 150-target combined score at 149.

== Schedule ==
Date	Time	Round
Saturday, 20 July 1996	10:00	Qualifying round
Sunday, 21 July 1996	10:00; 14:30	Qualifying round, continued Final

== Results ==
=== Qualifying round ===
Rank	Shooter	Nation	Day 1	Day 2	Total	Shoot-off	Notes
1	Michael Diamond	Australia	74	50	124	—N/a	Q, OR
2	Lance Bade	United States	73	50	123	—N/a	Q
3	Josh Lakatos	United States	74	49	123	—N/a	Q
4	John Maxwell	Australia	75	48	123	—N/a	Q
5	Vladimir Slamka	Slovakia	74	48	122	4	Q
6	Zhang Bing	China	74	48	122	3	Q
7	Manuel Vieira	Portugal	72	50	122	1	
8	Jiří Gach	Czech Republic	72	49	121	—N/a	
9	Karsten Bindrich	Germany	75	46	121	—N/a	
9	Peter Boden	Great Britain	74	47	121	—N/a	
9	George Leary	Canada	73	48	121	—N/a	
9	Zhang Yongjie	China	72	49	121	—N/a	
13	Zoltan Bodo	Hungary	72	48	120	—N/a	
13	Pavel Kubec	Czech Republic	73	47	120	—N/a	
13	Russell Mark	Australia	72	48	120	—N/a	
13	Park Chul-sung	South Korea	75	45	120	—N/a	
13	Giovanni Pellielo	Italy	72	48	120	—N/a	
13	José Pérez	Spain	74	46	120	—N/a	
13	João Rebelo	Portugal	70	50	120	—N/a	
20	Fehaid Al Deehani	Kuwait	71	48	119	—N/a	
20	Xavier Bouvier	Switzerland	74	45	119	—N/a	
20	Jörg Damme	Germany	72	47	119	—N/a	
20	Philippe Dupont	Belgium	71	48	119	—N/a	
20	Bret Erickson	United States	72	47	119	—N/a	
20	Károly Gombos	Hungary	71	48	119	—N/a	
20	Jean Labatut	Brazil	71	48	119	—N/a	
20	Lee Wung Yew	Singapore	73	46	119	—N/a	
20	Frans Pace	Malta	72	47	119	—N/a	
20	Marcello Tittarelli	Italy	71	48	119	—N/a	
20	Marco Venturini	Italy	70	49	119	—N/a	
31	Francesco Amici	San Marino	70	48	118	—N/a	
31	Danilo Caro	Colombia	72	46	118	—N/a	
31	Alejandro Fernández	Mexico	72	46	118	—N/a	
31	David Kostelecký	Czech Republic	70	48	118	—N/a	
31	Mansher Singh	India	69	49	118	—N/a	
31	Zhao Guisheng	China	70	48	118	—N/a	
37	Gerard Barcia	Andorra	68	49	117	—N/a	
37	Kevin Gill	Great Britain	71	46	117	—N/a	
37	Ivan Gulev	Bulgaria	69	48	117	—N/a	
37	Keld Hansen	Denmark	70	47	117	—N/a	
37	Christophe Vicard	France	70	47	117	—N/a	
42	Thomas Allen	Ireland	70	46	116	—N/a	
42	Armand Dousemont	Luxembourg	69	47	116	—N/a	
42	Brant Woodward	New Zealand	71	45	116	—N/a	
45	Paulo Morais	Angola	70	45	115	—N/a	
45	Heikki Jaansalu	Estonia	68	47	115	—N/a	
45	Dmytro Monakov	Ukraine	67	48	115	—N/a	
45	Paul Shaw	Canada	68	47	115	—N/a	
49	Jose Artecona	Puerto Rico	70	44	114	—N/a	
49	Francisco Boza	Peru	68	46	114	—N/a	
49	Cheng Shu Ming	Hong Kong	67	47	114	—N/a	
49	Michel Daou	Netherlands Antilles	68	46	114	—N/a	
49	Alp Kizilsu	Turkey	69	45	114	—N/a	
49	Uwe Möller	Germany	68	46	114	—N/a	
49	Frans Peeters	Belgium	69	45	114	—N/a	
56	George Earnshaw	Philippines	69	44	113	—N/a	
57	Mikhail Elpikidis	Greece	64	47	111	—N/a	
57	Huang I-chien	Chinese Taipei	65	46	111	—N/a	

=== Final ===
Rank	Shooter	Nation	Qual	Final	Total	4th place shoot-off	Silver shoot-off	Notes
1st place, gold medalist(s)	Michael Diamond	Australia	124	25	149	—N/a		OR
2nd place, silver medalist(s)	Josh Lakatos	United States	123	24	147	—N/a	28	
3rd place, bronze medalist(s)	Lance Bade	United States	123	24	147	—N/a	27	
4	John Maxwell	Australia	123	23	146	7	—N/a	
5	Zhang Bing	China	122	24	146	6	—N/a	
6	Vladimir Slamka	Slovakia	122	23	145	—N/a		

== Sources ==
- Olympic Report Atlanta 1996 Volume III: The Competition Results (PDF).
