= Bornman =

Bornman or Bornmann is a surname. Notable people with the surname include:

- Corné Bornman (1942–2021), South African sports shooter
- Erik Bornmann (born 1976), Canadian consultant
- Jannie Bornman (born 1980), South African professional rugby union player

== See also ==
- Borman
