= Shooting at the 1996 Summer Olympics – Men's double trap =

Sports shooting at the Olympics

Men's double trap at the Games of the XXVI Olympiad
- Venue: Wolf Creek Shooting Complex
- Date: 24 July 1996
- Competitors: 35 from 25 nations
- Winning score: 189 (OR)

Medalists
| 1st place, gold medalist(s) | | Russell Mark | Australia |
| 2nd place, silver medalist(s) | | Albano Pera | Italy |
| 3rd place, bronze medalist(s) | | Zhang Bing | China |

Men's double trap shooting made its first appearance at the 1996 Summer Olympics, with Russell Mark becoming the inaugural champion after a strong final. Albano Pera and Zhang Bing won the other medals after a shoot-off with Park Chul-sung.

== Qualification round ==
| Rank | Athlete | Country | A | B | C | Total | Shoot-off | Notes |
|---|---|---|---|---|---|---|---|---|
| 1 | Russell Mark | Australia | 47 | 46 | 48 | 141 | | Q OR |
| 2 | Huang I-chien | Chinese Taipei | 49 | 46 | 46 | 141 | | Q OR |
| 3 | Zhang Bing | China | 49 | 45 | 46 | 140 | | Q |
| 4 | Richard Faulds | Great Britain | 47 | 46 | 46 | 139 | | Q |
| 5 | Albano Pera | Italy | 45 | 50 | 44 | 139 | | Q |
| 6 | Park Chul-sung | South Korea | 47 | 43 | 48 | 138 | 6 | Q |
| 7 | Li Bo | China | 47 | 47 | 44 | 138 | 5 | |
| 8 | David Alcoriza | United States | 46 | 45 | 47 | 138 | 1 | |
| 9 | Mirco Cenci | Italy | 46 | 47 | 44 | 137 | | |
| 10 | Fehaid Al Deehani | Kuwait | 48 | 47 | 41 | 136 | | |
| 10 | Lance Bade | United States | 43 | 45 | 48 | 136 | | |
| 12 | Francisco Boza | Peru | 45 | 48 | 42 | 135 | | |
| 12 | Jean-Paul Gros | France | 47 | 43 | 45 | 135 | | |
| 12 | Kirk Reynolds | Canada | 43 | 45 | 47 | 135 | | |
| 15 | Karsten Bindrich | Germany | 46 | 45 | 42 | 133 | | |
| 15 | Raimo Kauppila | Finland | 42 | 44 | 47 | 133 | | |
| 17 | Steve Haberman | Australia | 45 | 41 | 45 | 131 | | |
| 17 | Marc Mennessier | France | 42 | 47 | 42 | 131 | | |
| 19 | Rod Boll | Canada | 40 | 45 | 45 | 130 | | |
| 19 | Philippe Dupont | Belgium | 47 | 43 | 40 | 130 | | |
| 19 | Jiri Gach | Czech Republic | 42 | 47 | 41 | 130 | | |
| 22 | Frans Peeters | Belgium | 41 | 42 | 45 | 128 | | |
| 22 | Waldemar Schanz | Germany | 42 | 42 | 44 | 128 | | |
| 24 | Karoly Gombos | Hungary | 40 | 44 | 43 | 127 | | |
| 25 | Thomas Allen | Ireland | 41 | 44 | 41 | 126 | | |
| 25 | Vladimir Slamka | Slovakia | 41 | 44 | 41 | 126 | | |
| 27 | Zoltan Bodo | Hungary | 42 | 41 | 42 | 125 | | |
| 27 | George Earnshaw | Philippines | 44 | 41 | 40 | 125 | | |
| 27 | Kevin Gill | Great Britain | 43 | 45 | 37 | 125 | | |
| 30 | Christos Sotiropoulos | Greece | 40 | 45 | 39 | 124 | | |
| 31 | Alp Kizilsu | Turkey | 37 | 46 | 40 | 123 | | |
| 32 | Frans Pace | Malta | 37 | 41 | 43 | 121 | | |
| 33 | Jose Artecona | Puerto Rico | 43 | 40 | 37 | 120 | | |
| 33 | Armand Dousemont | Luxembourg | 42 | 37 | 41 | 120 | | |
| 35 | Michel Daou | Netherlands Antilles | 42 | 34 | 37 | 113 | | |

OR Olympic record – Q Qualified for final

== Final ==
| Rank | Athlete | Qual | Final | Total | Shoot-off | Notes |
|---|---|---|---|---|---|---|
| 1st place, gold medalist(s) | Russell Mark (AUS) | 141 | 48 | 189 | | OR |
| 2nd place, silver medalist(s) | Albano Pera (ITA) | 139 | 44 | 183 | 7 | |
| 3rd place, bronze medalist(s) | Zhang Bing (CHN) | 140 | 43 | 183 | 6 | |
| 4 | Park Chul-sung (KOR) | 138 | 45 | 183 | 2 | |
| 5 | Richard Faulds (GBR) | 139 | 41 | 180 | | |
| 6 | Huang I-chien (TPE) | 141 | 37 | 178 | | |

OR Olympic record

== Sources ==
- Olympic Report Atlanta 1996 Volume III: The Competition Results (PDF).
