= Berardino =

Berardino is a surname. Notable people with the surname include:

- Dick Berardino (born 1937), American baseball player and coach
- Joseph Berardino (born 1950), American businessman and accountant
- Riccardo Berardino, (born 1990), Italian footballer
- Bill Berardino, President of Kollective Automotive Group
- William Berardino, Canadian lawyer
