= Jean Labatut =

Jean Labatut may refer to:

- Jean Labatut (architect) (c. 1899–1986), American architect
- Jean Labatut (sport shooter) (born 1971), Brazilian sports shooter
