= List of King's Counsel Appointments in British Columbia =

King's Counsel are appointed by the provincial Cabinet on the advice of the Attorney General of British Columbia. No more than 7% of the bar of British Columbia can be appointed King's Counsel. Before making the recommendation to Cabinet, the Attorney General is required by statute to consult with the Chief Justice of British Columbia, the Chief Justice of the Supreme Court of British Columbia, and two benchers (directors) of the Law Society of British Columbia, one of whom is usually the president of the Law Society. The honorary appointment recognizes British Columbia lawyers for distinctive merit and exceptional contributions to the legal profession. Successful candidates will have demonstrated professional integrity and good character and must have been a member of the British Columbia bar for at least five years. In practice, the Attorney General appoints an advisory committee which includes these officials and also the Chief Judge of the Provincial Court, the president of the British Columbia Branch of the Canadian Bar Association and the deputy attorney general. The Attorney General is automatically appointed as King's Counsel on taking office.

== List of office holders ==
The following is a partial list of the office holders, based on annual announcements from the Attorney General of British Columbia:

Sortable table
Name	Year appointed
Frances Joan Connell	2017
Calvin Stewart Sandborn	2017
Michael Fitzwilliam Welsh	2017
Peter Maurice German	2017
Gordon Harvey Houston	2017
Gerald Allen Cuttler	2017
John Scott Logan	2017
Douglas John Marion	2017
Deborah Ann Armour	2017
Margaret Heather Mason	2017
Christopher Andrew McPherson	2017
Jeffrey Richard Ray	2017
James Michael Sullivan	2017
Michael Johnny McDonald	2017
Ursula Botz	2017
Richard Wayne de Boer	2017
Shelley Lynn Sugarman	2017
Zoolfikar Kamrudin Bhimji Suleman	2017
Donna Mary Turko	2017
Karima Andani	2017
Lisa Joan Hamilton	2017
Ardith Alison Walkem	2017
Tamara Miriam Levy	2017
Paul Christopher Doroshenko	2017
Monique Carmel Pongracic-Speier	2017
Jamie Fraser Maclaren	2017
Corrinne Lee Ongman	2018
John Walter Bromley	2018
Robert Dewart Gibbens	2018
Adam Charles Whitcombe	2018
Barry Neville Zacharias	2018
Fiona MacDonald Begg	2018
Mary Bridget Hamilton	2018
Gordon George Matei	2018
Brian Michael Samuels	2018
Philip Alexander Riddell	2018
Hugh William Veenstra	2018
Russell Charles Gordon	2018
Lindsay Margaret Lyster	2018
Nazeer Tajdin Mitha	2018
Michelle Denise Stanford	2018
Julianne Krystal Lamb	2018
Aleem Shiraz Bharmal	2018
Mary Audna Buttery	2018
Nikos Emil Harris	2018
Steven Ronald McKoen	2018
Brock Andrew Martland	2018
Michael Andre Feder	2018
Celeste Ann Haldane	2018
James Nicholas Harvey	2018
Claire Elizabeth Hunter	2018
Murray Lorne Smith	2019
Paul Thomas McGivern	2019
Michael Dudley Lucas	2019
Drew Stavers White	2019
Joseph Michael Doyle	2019
Clifford Gerald Proudfoot	2019
Simon Raymond Coval	2019
James Harvey Goulden	2019
Rosemarie Ann Keith	2019
Jasmin Zubaida Ahmad	2019
Reidar Meyer Mogerman	2019
James Conrad MacInnis	2019
Roshan Philip Danesh	2019
Barbara Ann Carmichael	2019
Lisa Christine Fong	2019
Jeevyn Dhaliwal	2019
Kasandra Bruyns Cronin	2019
John-Paul Ernest Boyd	2019
Bradford Frederick Smith	2019
Sean Hern	2019
Catherine Dorothy Clarke Dauvergne	2019
Donald John Avison	2019
Louisa Mala Winn	2019
Merle Craig Alexander	2019
Rodney Graeme Garson	2019
Ian Bruce Josephson	2020
Bruce Harold Ralston	2020
Kathleen Marjorie Kendall	2020
Peter John Gerard Landry	2020
Karen Martin	2020
John Douglas Jevning	2020
Joel Alan Nitikman	2020
Thomas Peter Felhauer	2020
Tara Renee Britnell	2020
Nancy Laine Carter	2020
Robert Antony Sider	2020
Colin Forsyth	2020
Janet Patricia Grove	2020
Christopher Mark Rusnak	2020
Kenneth Howard Armstrong	2020
Jacqueline Grace McQueen	2020
Brook Joseph Greenberg	2020
Donald Michael Bain	2020
Jane Laura Benedet	2020
Sarah Yasmin Khan	2020
Patrick Michael McGowan	2020
Eric Vance Gottardi	2020
Ryan Douglas Warner Dalziel	2020
Jacqueline Delaine Hughes	2020
Harinder Nina Purewal	2020
Douglas Stephen White (Kwul'a'sul'tun)	2020
Debra Anne Carpentier	2021
Richard Alexander Ross	2021
Robert Clair Claus	2021
Rajinder Singh Bhalla	2021
Mary Margaret Terresa MacKinnon	2021
Richard (Craig) Allen Neville	2021
Robert (Bob) Jan D’Eith	2021
Kimberly (Kim) Jan Jakeman	2021
Graeme Keirstead	2021
Gregory Arthur Petrisor	2021
Barbara Lee Cromarty	2021
Karen Evelyn Jamieson	2021
Kevin Douglas Loo	2021
Marie Potvin	2021
Scott Lorne Booth	2021
Andrew Ian Nathanson	2021
Elizabeth June Rowbotham	2021
Jonathan Noel Eades	2021
Terri-Lynn Williams-Davidson	2021
Thomas Michael Arbogast	2021
Geoffrey William White	2021
Martha Rans	2021
Lesley Ann Ruzicka	2021
Karey Marlane Brooks	2021
Andrea Margaret Hilland	2021
John McInnes Rice	2021
Leah Bernadette Marie Fontaine	2021
Maegen McCallum Giltrow	2021
Alison Maia Latimer	2021
Jennifer Jane Lee Brun	2021
William McLachlan	2022
Don Sihota	2022
Simon Buck	2022
Cameron Belsher	2022
Shafik Bhalloo	2022
Rosanne Kyle	2022
Brendan McCabe	2022
Michael Libby	2022
Joseph McArthur	2022
Mark Underhill	2022
Amy Mortimore	2022
Stacey Ederza Fox	2022
John Gareth Morley	2022
Mark Gervin	2022
Marko Vesely	2022
Li-Jeen Broshko	2022
Cristen Gleeson	2022
Peter Lawless	2022
Sarah Westwood	2022
Louise Jane Kenworthy	2022
Karen Snowshoe	2022
Brent Olthuis	2022
Katrina Harry	2022
Grace Pastine	2022
Micah Rankin	2022
Elin Sigurdson	2022
Zara Suleman	2022
Clare Jennings	2022
Colleen Spier	2022
Peter Senkpiel	2022
Robert Bauman	2023
Peter Grant	2023
Carol Baird Ellan	2023
Gregory Nash	2023
Anders Ourom	2023
Heidi-Ann Mason	2023
Brad Dixon	2023
Veeda Victoria Shroff	2023
Julie Williams	2023
Stephen Ballard	2023
Kinji Bourchier	2023
Jason LeBlond	2023
Gurminder Sandhu	2023
Marc Kazimirski	2023
Shannon Ramsay	2023
Rubinder Dhanu	2023
Susanne Elliott	2023
Theresa Iandiorio	2023
Miranda Lam	2023
Karrie Wolfe	2023
Lindsay LeBlanc	2023
Josh Paterson	2023
Kasari Govender	2023
Shannon Salter	2023
Cheryl D'Sa	2023
Joven Narwal	2023
Peter Ameerali	2024
Morgan Camley	2024
Michelle Casavant	2024
Nikki Charlton	2024
Mary Childs	2024
Beverly Churchill	2024
Christina Cook	2024
Barbara Cornish	2024
Vincent Critchley	2024
Michaela Donnelly	2024
Stephanie Fabbro	2024
Grant Haddock	2024
Kevin Kohan	2024
Andrew MacDonald	2024
Andrea MacKay	2024
Anne MacKenzie	2024
Raji Mangat	2024
Suzette Narbonne	2024
Emily Ohler	2024
Mark Oulton	2024
David Paterson	2024
Georges Rivard	2024
Salima Samnani	2024
Kate Saunders	2024
Jon Sigurdson	2024
Thomas Spraggs	2024
Karen Tse	2024
John Tuck	2024
Gaynor Yeung	2024
Efrat Arbel	2025
Anita Atwal	2025
Keith Bergner	2025
Martin Bühler	2025
Cynthia Callison	2025
Karen Carteri	2025
Tanya Chamberlain	2025
Candace Cho	2025
Robert Deane	2025
Timothy Delaney	2025
Michelle Fuchs	2025
Kimberly Henders Miller	2025
Georald Ingborg	2025
Michael Kleisinger	2025
Emily Lapper	2025
Kamaljit Lehal	2025
Anthony Leoni	2025
Kevin MacDonald	2025
Valerie Mann	2025
Heidi McBride	2025
Denise McCabe	2025
Lee Nevens	2025
Daniel Porte	2025
Chantelle Rajotte	2025
Mark Tweedy	2025
