= Labatut =

Labatut (French pronunciation: [labaty]) may refer to:

== Places ==
in France

- Labatut, Ariège, a commune in the Ariège department
- Labatut, Landes, a commune in the Landes department
- Labatut-Figuières, formerly Labatut, a commune in the Pyrénées-Atlantiques department
- Labatut-Rivière, [labaty ʁivjɛʁ]; Occitan: L'Abatut) is a commune in the Hautes-Pyrénées department

in the United States

- Labatut (New Roads, Louisiana), listed on the NRHP in Louisiana

== Other ==
- Labatut (surname)
