= Motoharu =

- Gender: Male

Origin
- Origin: Japanese
- Meaning: Different meanings depending on the kanji used

Motoharu (written: 元治, 元春 or 基春) is a masculine Japanese given name. Notable people with the name include:

- Gosho Motoharu (五所 元治), Japanese kobudoka
- Motoharu Hirano (平野 元治; born 1940), Japanese sport shooter
- Kikkawa Motoharu (吉川 元春; 1530–1586), Japanese daimyō
- Motoharu Kurosawa (黒澤 元治; born 1940), Japanese racing driver
- Motoharu Matsumura (松村 元治; born 1946), Japanese cross-country skier
- Motoharu Okamura (岡村 基春; 1901–1948), Japanese naval aviator
- Motoharu Sano (佐野 元春; born 1956), Japanese musician
- Yamaji Motoharu (山地 元治; 1841–1897), Japanese general
- Motoharu Yoshizawa (吉沢 元治; 1931–1998), Japanese bass guitarist
