= Labatut (surname) =

Labatut (French pronunciation: [labaty]) is a French surname that may refer to the following notable people:

- André Labatut (1891–1977), French fencer
- Benjamín Labatut (born 1980), Chilean writer
- Jean Labatut (architect) (c. 1899–1986), American architect
- Jean Labatut (sport shooter) (born 1971), Brazilian sports shooter
- Guta Stresser (born Maria Augusta Labatut Stresser in 1972), Brazilian actress, writer, and theatre director
- Pierre Labatut (1776–1849), French general
