= Željko Vadić =

Croatian sports shooter

Personal information
- Nationality: Croatian
- Born: 27 March 1953 (age 72); Velika Gorica, Yugoslavia

Sport
- Sport: Sports shooting

Željko Vadić (born 27 March 1953) is a Croatian sports shooter. He competed in the mixed trap event at the 1992 Summer Olympics.
