= Diego García (sport shooter) =

Mexican sports shooter

Personal information
- Nationality: Mexican
- Born: 3 October 1944 (age 80)

Sport
- Sport: Sports shooting

Diego García (born 3 October 1944) is a Mexican sports shooter. He competed in the mixed trap event at the 1984 Summer Olympics.
