= Anastasios Lordos =

Cypriot sports shooter (1949–2020)

Personal information
- Nationality: Cypriot
- Born: 17 December 1949 Famagusta
- Died: 13 November 2020 (aged 70) Limassol

Sport
- Sport: Sports shooting

Anastasios Lordos (17 December 1949 – 13 November 2020) was a Cypriot sports shooter. He competed in the mixed trap event at the 1984 Summer Olympics.

Nicknamed Tasos (Τάσος Λόρδος), Lordos was considered one of the greatest Cypriot shooters, winning the national trap shooting championship each year from 1984 to 1987 and being named the trap shooter of the year by the Cyprus Sports Writers' Association five times.
