= Huang I-chien =

Taiwanese sports shooter

Huang I-chien (born July 10, 1957) is a Taiwanese sport shooter. He competed at the 1996 Summer Olympics in the men's trap event, in which he tied for 57th place, and the men's double trap event, in which he placed sixth.
