= José Pérez (sport shooter) =

Spanish sports shooter

Personal information
- Nationality: Spanish
- Born: 17 September 1957 (age 67); Madrid, Spain

Sport
- Sport: Sports shooting

José Pérez (born 17 September 1957) is a Spanish sports shooter. He competed in the men's trap event at the 1996 Summer Olympics.
