= William Berardino =

Canadian lawyer

William S. Berardino, KC is a British Columbia lawyer who was appointed by the provincial government to serve as a special prosecutor in the trials associated with the BC Legislature Raids.

He graduated from the University of British Columbia (UBC) in Vancouver in 1962 and obtained his law degree from the UBC Faculty of Law in 1965. Berardino was called to the bar of British Columbia in 1966 and is a member of the bar in the Yukon. He was appointed Queen's Counsel in 1985.

He is a partner in Hunter Litigation Chambers. His practice area is general litigation representing clients before the Supreme and Appellate Courts of British Columbia and the Federal Court of Canada. Berardino was atop the 2011 Chambers Global list of top class-action lawyers in Canada.

In 1986, as part of a libel case against The Globe and Mail and Canadian Broadcasting Corporation (CBC), Berardino won a judgement to permit his client the Bank of British Columbia to view CBC's videotapes of interviews that were not broadcast. The BC Court of Appeals later overturned the decision.

Berardino represented the federal government of Canada before the Courts of the Yukon and Northwest Territories and the Federal Court of Canada to defend the constitutional validity of the Meech Lake Accord, a set of failed amendments to the Constitution of Canada negotiated in 1987. He also represented Imperial Tobacco in their failed appeal (Imperial Tobacco v. British Columbia) to the Supreme Court of Canada to overturn provincial legislation permitting governments to recoup medical costs from tobacco companies for smoking-related illnesses

Berardino was also a member of the judicial reform committee chaired by Ted Hughes that led to significant changes in the British Columbia judicial structure.

During the high-profile BC Rail case, the Law Society of British Columbia investigated a complaint that his law firm had not disclosed that it had donated $500 to the political campaign of former Attorney-General Wally Oppal in 2005. The Society's investigation concluded there was no evidence of professional misconduct. In the landmark 2009 case R. v. Basi, Berardino successfully argued before the Supreme Court of Canada to protect the identity of an informant.

In 2007, he wrote a letter on behalf of City of Vancouver Mayor Sam Sullivan that warned city councillor Raymond Louie about potential defamation.
