= Vladimir Slamka =

Slovak sport shooter

Vladimír Slamka (born December 2, 1966, in Zvolen) is a Slovak sport shooter. He competed at the 1996 Summer Olympics in the men's trap event, in which he placed sixth, and the men's double trap event, in which he tied for 25th place.
