= Demetris Lordos =

Cypriot sports shooter (born 1945)

Personal information
- Nationality: Cypriot
- Born: 3 November 1945 (age 79)

Sport
- Sport: Sports shooting

Demetris Lordos (born 3 November 1945) is a Cypriot sports shooter. He competed in the mixed trap event at the 1992 Summer Olympics.
