= Michel Think =

Luxembourgish sports shooter (1960–2024)

Personal information
- Nationality: Luxembourgish
- Born: 24 April 1960; Dudelange, Luxembourg
- Died: 18 September 2024 (aged 64)

Sport
- Sport: Sports shooting

Michel Think (24 April 1960 – 18 September 2024) was a Luxembourgish sports shooter. He competed in the mixed trap event at the 1992 Summer Olympics.
