= R v Basi =

2009 Supreme Court of Canada case

- Supreme Court of Canada

Hearing: April 22, 2009 Judgment: November 19, 2009
- Full case name: Her Majesty The Queen v. Udhe Singh (Dave) Basi, Bobby Singh Virk and Aneal Basi
- Citations: 2009 SCC 52, [2009] 3 S.C.R. 389
- Docket No.: 32719
- Prior history: Judgment for the defence in the British Columbia Court of Appeal
- Ruling: Appeal allowed.

Holding
- A defendant and their counsel may not access information over which informer privilege is claimed until a judge has decided that the privilege does not exist or an exception applies. This may sometimes require a hearing without the defendant or defence counsel present to resolve the issue.

Court membership
- Chief Justice: Beverley McLachlin; Puisne Justices: Ian Binnie, Louis LeBel, Marie Deschamps, Morris Fish, Rosalie Abella, Louise Charron, Marshall Rothstein, Thomas Cromwell

Reasons given
- Unanimous reasons by: Fish J.
- Deschamps and Cromwell JJ. took no part in the consideration or decision of the case.

R v Basi [2009] 3 S.C.R. 389, 2009 SCC 52 is a landmark decision by Supreme Court of Canada where the Court weighed the rights of the defendant versus the privileges of an informant in an important trial into alleged government corruption.

The judgment reads:

The accused were charged with corruption, fraud, and breach of trust under the Criminal Code . Given that some material produced on an application for disclosure had been blacked out, defence counsel applied for “unredacted” copies.

The Crown objected, claiming informer privilege. The Crown contended that the claim could not be properly established without live testimony by a police officer, and insisted on an in camera and ex parte hearing.

Defence counsel objected to the ex parte nature of the hearing and applied for permission to attend, without their clients. When the trial judge held that defence counsel could participate fully in the in camera hearing so long as they were subject to a court order and undertakings, the Crown invoked s. 37 of the Canada Evidence Act (“CEA ”), which provides for non‑disclosure where a public interest is at stake.

The trial judge affirmed her previous decision, and the Court of Appeal, in a majority decision, dismissed the Crown’s appeal made pursuant to s. 37.1 of the CEA and upheld the trial judge’s ruling. The Crown then appealed to this Court on the issue of whether the trial judge erred in permitting defence counsel to attend the in camera hearing, and the accused cross‑appealed on the issue of whether the Court of Appeal had jurisdiction to hear the Crown’s appeal.

Held: The appeal should be allowed and the cross‑appeal dismissed.

== Background ==
Three employees of the provincial government of British Columbia were charged with corruption and breach of trust following the BC Legislature Raids.

On December 6, 2007, British Columbia Supreme Court Justice Elizabeth Bennett ruled against a pre-trial Crown request to exclude defence lawyers from an in-camera hearing on information involving a police informant.

=== British Columbia Court of Appeal ===
The British Columbia Court of Appeal split 2-1 in upholding the trial judge's decision. This allowed the defendants' lawyers to be present during a hearing regarding disclosure of documents to the defence that involved a police informant.

== Reasons of the Court ==
The Supreme Court of Canada heard the appeal on April 22, 2009. Intervenors were the Director of Public Prosecutions of Canada, Attorney General of Ontario, Canadian Association of Chiefs of Police and Criminal Lawyers’ Association (Ontario).

The unanimous judgment was written by Morris Fish.

The Court found that where a hearing is required to determine a claim of informer privilege, the hearing must be held ex parte, without the defendant or their counsel present, but only if it is required to keep the informer's identity confidential. The hearing should only be held ex parte as necessary. Trial judges should adopt all reasonable measures to permit defence counsel to make meaningful submissions regarding what occurs in their absence. Trial judges have broad discretion to craft appropriate procedures in this regard.

The Court went on to suggest various methods trial judges may adopt to limit the unfairness to a defendant.

== See also ==
- List of Supreme Court of Canada cases (McLachlin Court)
- List of Supreme Court of Canada cases
