= Urmas Saaliste =

Estonian sports shooter

Urmas Saaliste (born September 22, 1960, in Tartu) is an Estonian sport shooter. He competed at the Summer Olympics in 1988 and 1992. In 1988, he placed seventh in the mixed trap event, and in 1992, he tied for 39th place in the mixed trap event.
