= Antonio Palminha =

Portuguese sports shooter

Antonio Palminha (born 15 April 1963 in Sines) is a Portuguese sport shooter. He competed at the 1992 Summer Olympics in the mixed trap event, in which he tied for eleventh place.
