= Heikki Jaansalu =

Estonian sports shooter

Personal information
- Nationality: Estonian
- Born: 16 March 1959 (age 67) Tallinn, then part of Estonian SSR, Soviet Union

Sport
- Sport: Sports shooting

Heikki Jaansalu (born 16 March 1959) is an Estonian sports shooter. He competed in the men's trap event at the 1996 Summer Olympics.

Jaansalu was born in Tallinn. His father, Herbert Jaansalu, was a sports shooter, coach, referee, and sports shooting judge. Jaansalu is a graduate of Tallinn University and completed a degree in agriculture and civil engineering from Tallinn Construction and Mechanical Engineering College in 1983.

Jaansalu began practicing sports shooting under guidance of his father in 1973. He was a member of the Estonian national team from 1980 until 2010. From 1980 to 2012, he was the nine times individual, and seven times male Estonian champion, and 1978 individual Latvian champion. He set five national Estonian records. He is a two-time Shooting Association grand champion (1983 and 1995).
