= Hélder Cavaco =

Portuguese sports shooter

Personal information
- Nationality: Portuguese
- Born: 3 September 1965 (age 60)

Sport
- Sport: Sports shooting
Medal record
Men's shooting
Representing Portugal
World Championships
Gold medal – first place	1987 Valencia	Trap team

Hélder Cavaco (born 3 September 1965) is a Portuguese sports shooter.

Cavaco became ISSF Olympic trap world champion in the team event in 1987 in Valencia. He competed in the mixed trap event at the 1988 Summer Olympics.
