= Pat Bawtinheimer =

Canadian sports shooter

Personal information
- Born: 24 November 1961 (age 63); Red Deer, Alberta, Canada

Sport
- Sport: Sports shooting

Pat Bawtinheimer (born 24 November 1961) is a Canadian sports shooter. He competed in the mixed trap event at the 1984 Summer Olympics.
