= Rod Boll =

Canadian sports shooter (1952–2021)

Personal information
- Born: 9 July 1952; Fillmore, Saskatchewan, Canada
- Died: 28 January 2021 (aged 68)

Sport
- Sport: Sports shooting

Rod Boll (9 July 1952 – 28 January 2021) was a Canadian sports shooter. He competed in the men's double trap event at the 1996 Summer Olympics. Boll also competed at two editions of the Pan American Games, and won more than twenty titles during his career. He was posthumously inducted into the Saskatchewan Sports Hall of Fame.

== Biography ==
Boll was born in Fillmore, Saskatchewan in 1952. He was brought up on a farm and began trap shooting when he was 16, winning a junior title in 1970.

At the 1996 Summer Olympics in Atlanta, Boll competed in the men's double trap event, where he finished in 19th place. Boll competed at the 1995 Pan American Games and the 2003 Pan American Games, where he won gold in 1995 in the double trap team event.

During his life, Boll won more than twenty provincial and national shooting titles. His last title came in 2019, before he died of a heart attack in January 2021. Four months after his death, he was inducted into the Saskatchewan Sports Hall of Fame. His son, Kahl, is also a trap shooter.
