= Avelino Palma =

Brazilian sports shooter

Personal information
- Born: 28 February 1948 (age 77); Ribeirão Preto, Brazil

Sport
- Sport: Sports shooting

Avelino Palma (born 28 February 1948) is a Brazilian sports shooter. He competed in the mixed trap event at the 1984 Summer Olympics.
