= Pavel Kubec =

Czech sport shooter (born 1966)

Pavel Kubec (born 11 October 1966 in Louny) is a Czech sport shooter. He competed at the Summer Olympics in 1992 and 1996. In 1992, he placed fifth in the mixed trap event, and in 1996, he tied for 13th place in the men's trap event.
