= Ludwig Puser =

Austrian sports shooter

Personal information
- Nationality: Austrian
- Born: 17 April 1946 (age 78)

Sport
- Sport: Sports shooting

Ludwig Puser (born 17 April 1946) is an Austrian sports shooter. He competed in the mixed trap event at the 1984 Summer Olympics.
