= Peter Aagaard Jensen =

Danish sports shooter (born 1956)

Personal information
- Nationality: Danish
- Born: 19 February 1956 (age 70)

Sport
- Sport: Sports shooting

Peter Aagaard Jensen (born 19 February 1956) is a Danish sports shooter. He competed in the mixed trap event at the 1988 Summer Olympics.
