= Carolyn Koch =

American sports shooter

Personal information
- Nationality: American
- Born: June 7, 1967 (age 57)

Sport
- Sport: Sports shooting

Carolyn Koch (born June 7, 1967) is an American sports shooter. She competed in the mixed trap event at the 1988 Summer Olympics. She was 11 when she started shooting, beginning with skeet shooting at the Duncan Gun Club. She qualified for the 1988 Olympics following her victory at the American National Championships. She went on to win two more national championships. She retired from competitive shooting after she developed rheumatoid arthritis.
