= Joan Besoli =

Andorran trap shooter

Joan Besoli Lluelles
Personal information
- Born: 17 September 1959 (age 66)

Sport
- Sport: Sports shooting

Joan Besoli Lluelles (born 17 September 1959) is an Andorran trap shooter who competed in the 1992 Summer Olympics.

Besoli competed in the mixed trap shooting event at the 1992 Summer Olympics and scored 140 hits in the qualification round, finishing in joint 29th place and failing to qualify for the semi-finals.
