= David William Ramsay =

Canadian lawyer and judge

- Born: 1943; Halifax, Nova Scotia, Canada
- Died: January 19, 2008 (aged 64–65); Dorchester, New Brunswick, Canada
- Education: University of Victoria
- Occupations: Lawyer; judge
- Children: 4
- Convictions: Breach of trust; Sexual assault causing bodily harm; Sexual exploitation of a child (×3)
- Penalty: Seven years imprisonment

David William Ramsay (1943–2008) was a Canadian lawyer and judge who was imprisoned for sexual assault on minors, some of whom appeared before him in court. Ramsay targeted Indigenous girls as young as twelve.

Ramsey was born in Halifax, Nova Scotia, in 1943 and moved to Port Alberni, British Columbia, with his family after World War II. He received a degree in Education from the University of Victoria in 1964 and taught elementary school for two years. He then returned to the University of Victoria from which he received a law degree in 1971. He articled under the late Harold Bogle, QC, in Prince George, British Columbia, following which he worked for a year at the firm of Phelps & Voyer in Whitehorse, Yukon Territory.

In 1973, he was hired by the British Columbia Legal Aid Society and returned to Prince George to open its first legal aid office. In 1975, he returned to private practice. He was appointed to the Provincial Court in 1991. He was married and had four children.

== Crimes and prosecution ==
During his tenure as judge, Ramsay on multiple occasions picked up Indigenous girls as young as twelve and sexually assaulted them. He insisted on not using a condom, and on one occasion, when the girl resisted, he became enraged and smashed her head against the dashboard of his car. Several of these young women appeared before him in court.

A special prosecutor, Dennis Murray, Q.C., was appointed to investigate the charges. Associate Chief Justice Patrick Dohm of the British Columbia Supreme Court was appointed as judge.

Ramsay was indicted in August 2002. Six weeks later, in September 2002, he attempted suicide. On May 3, 2003, he pleaded guilty to five of the ten charges in the indictment; the other charges were stayed.

He was convicted of one count of breach of trust, one count of sexual assault causing bodily harm, and three counts of sexual exploitation of a child. In June 2004, he was sentenced to seven years in prison.

Three years into his sentence, Ramsay applied unsuccessfully for day parole in 2007 on the grounds that he had terminal cancer. He died in Dorchester Penitentiary on January 19, 2008.
