= Zhang Bing (sport shooter) =

Chinese sport shooter (born 1969)

Olympic medal record

Representing China

Men's shooting

Olympic Games
Bronze medal – third place	1996 Atlanta	Double trap

Zhang Bing (Chinese: 张冰; born 6 January 1969) is a male Chinese sports shooter. He competed at the 1996 Olympic Games, and won a bronze medal in men's double trap.

Olympic results
Event	1988	1992	1996
Trap (mixed)	43rd 135	8th 146+48	Not held
Trap (men)	Not held		5th 122+24
Double trap (men)	Not held		(bronze) Bronze; 140+43
