= Olegario Farrés =

Paraguayan sports shooter (1934–2022)

Personal information
- Nationality: Paraguayan
- Born: 13 August 1934; Asunción, Paraguay
- Died: 7 March 2022 (aged 87)

Sport
- Sport: Sports shooting

Olegario Farrés Mongelós (13 August 1934 – 7 March 2022) was a Paraguayan sports shooter. He competed in the mixed trap event at the 1984 Summer Olympics. Farrés died on 7 March 2022, at the age of 87. He was considered one of the pioneers of shooting in Paraguay, and a tournament was named in his honor after his death.
