= Patrick Dohm =

Canadian judge

Patrick Dohm (April 16, 1935 – August 4, 2023) was a Canadian judge of the Supreme Court of British Columbia for 15 years.

Dohm was born and raised in Kamloops, and obtained his Bachelor of Laws from the University of British Columbia in Vancouver. He was called to the bar in 1962 and practised law in Kamloops for 10 years with prominent lawyer E. Davie Fulton. During this time, his work included helping to form the Greater Kamloops Zoological Society in 1965. He was appointed to the county court bench in 1972 and elevated to the B.C. Supreme Court in 1980. He was appointed Associate Chief Justice, the second highest position in that court, by the Prime Minister of Canada in 1995.

Dohm retired as Associate Chief Justice in April 2010 at the mandatory retirement age of 75. He had dealt with the early stages of most of the high-profile criminal cases—including the trial of Premier Glen Clark, the Air India bombing trial and the trial of serial killer Robert Pickton. He sentenced disgraced judge David Ramsay to prison. He was succeeded by Anne MacKenzie.

As one of the longest-serving judges, he was regarded by some as BC's most prominent jurist and was well known for granting bail to the accused. Dohm died August 4, 2023, at the age of 88.
