= Matti Nummela =

Finnish sport shooter

Matti Nummela (born February 23, 1955, in Orimattila) is a Finnish sport shooter. He competed in trap shooting events at the Summer Olympics in 1984, 1988, and 1992.

== Olympic results ==
Event	1984	1988	1992
Trap (mixed)	T-33rd	8th	T-44th
