= Pablo Vergara (sport shooter) =

Chilean sports shooter

Personal information
- Nationality: Chilean
- Born: 9 October 1954 (age 70)

Sport
- Sport: Sports shooting

Pablo Vergara (born 9 October 1954) is a Chilean sports shooter. He competed in the mixed trap event at the 1984 Summer Olympics.
