= Kirk Reynolds =

Canadian sports shooter

Personal information
- Born: 20 November 1974 (age 51) Outlook, Saskatchewan, Canada

Sport
- Sport: Sports shooting
Medal record
Representing Canada
Pan American Games
Gold medal – first place	1995 Mar del Plata	Double trap team
Silver medal – second place	1995 Mar del Plata	Double trap
Commonwealth Games
Silver medal – second place	2006 Melbourne	Trap

Kirk Reynolds (born 20 November 1974) is a Canadian sports shooter. He competed in the men's double trap event at the 1996 Summer Olympics.
