= Jesús Tirado =

Puerto Rican sports shooter

Personal information
- Nationality: Puerto Rican
- Born: 9 March 1948 (age 77); San Juan, Puerto Rico

Sport
- Sport: Sports shooting

Jesús Tirado Castro (born 9 March 1948) is a Puerto Rican sports shooter. He competed in the mixed trap event at the 1992 Summer Olympics.
