= Bean van Limbeek =

Dutch sports shooter

Bean van Limbeek (August 11, 1944–November 22, 2014) was a Dutch sport shooter. He competed at the 1988 Summer Olympics in the mixed trap event, in which he placed fifth.
