= Gilbert Duchateau =

Belgian sports shooter (1948–2021)

Personal information
- Nationality: Belgian
- Born: 4 January 1948 Sint-Truiden, Belgium
- Died: 24 January 2021 (aged 73)

Sport
- Sport: Sports shooting

Gilbert Duchateau (4 January 1948 – 24 January 2021) was a Belgian sports shooter. He competed in the mixed trap event at the 1984 Summer Olympics.
