= Guillermo Castellanos =

Mexican sports shooter (born 1959)

Personal information
- Nationality: Mexican
- Born: 6 November 1959
- Died: August 30, 2000 (aged 40) Tijuana, Mexico

Sport
- Sport: Sports shooting

Guillermo Castellanos Martínez (6 November 1959 – 30 August 2000) was a Mexican sports shooter and politician. He competed in the mixed trap event at the 1984 Summer Olympics.

Castellanos was a nine-time national shooting champion. He also won two gold medals at the Central American and Caribbean Games. After his sports career, he became a politician. He was a member of the Institutional Revolutionary Party (PRI) party and served in the Congress of Baja California and in the Mexican Congress. He was also the PRI secretary-general for the state of Baja California. He was planning to run for mayor of Tijuana in 2000, but was shot and killed by his home on 30 August that year.
