= Keld Hansen =

Danish sports shooter (born 1962)

Personal information
- Nationality: Danish
- Born: 9 June 1962 (age 63); Esbjerg, Denmark

Sport
- Sport: Sports shooting

Keld Hansen (born 9 June 1962) is a Danish sports shooter. He competed in the men's trap event at the 1996 Summer Olympics.
