= César Ortíz =

Mexican sports shooter

Personal information
- Nationality: Mexican
- Born: 12 August 1949 (age 75)

Sport
- Sport: Sports shooting

César Ortíz (born 12 August 1949) is a Mexican sports shooter. He competed in the mixed trap event at the 1992 Summer Olympics.
