= Ivan Derevsky =

Soviet sports shooter

Personal information
- Nationality: Soviet
- Born: 8 April 1966 (age 58)

Sport
- Sport: Sports shooting

Ivan Derevsky (born 8 April 1966) is a Soviet sports shooter. He competed in the mixed trap event at the 1992 Summer Olympics.
