= Jean Ané =

French sports shooter

Personal information
- Nationality: French
- Born: 25 July 1961 (age 63)

Sport
- Sport: Sports shooting

Jean Ané (born 25 July 1961) is a French sports shooter. He competed in the mixed trap event at the 1984 Summer Olympics.
