= Ivan Gulev =

Bulgarian sports shooter

Personal information
- Nationality: Bulgarian
- Born: 12 December 1957 (age 67); Asenovgrad, Bulgaria

Sport
- Sport: Sports shooting

Ivan Gulev (Bulgarian: Иван Гулев; born 12 December 1957) is a Bulgarian sports shooter. He competed in the men's trap event at the 1996 Summer Olympics.
