= Clive Conolly =

Zimbabwean sports shooter (born 1955)

Personal information
- Nationality: Zimbabwean
- Born: 1 April 1955 (age 69)

Sport
- Sport: Sports shooting

Clive Conolly (born 1 April 1955) is a Zimbabwean sports shooter. He competed in the mixed trap event at the 1984 Summer Olympics.
