= Brian Ballard =

American sports shooter

Personal information
- Born: November 18, 1960 (age 65) Culdesac, Idaho, United States

Sport
- Sport: Sport shooting
Medal record
Representing United States
Pan American Games
| Gold medal – first place | 1995 Mar del Plata | Trap team |

Brian E. Ballard (born November 18, 1960) is a former American sport shooter who competed in the 1988 Summer Olympics where he finished 17th in the trap event.
