= Alejandro Fernández (sport shooter) =

Mexican sports shooter

Personal information
- Born: 2 April 1959 (age 65); Jalapa, Mexico

Sport
- Sport: Sports shooting

Alejandro Fernández (born 2 April 1959) is a Mexican sports shooter. He competed in the men's trap event at the 1996 Summer Olympics.
