= Petr Hrdlička =

Czech sport shooter

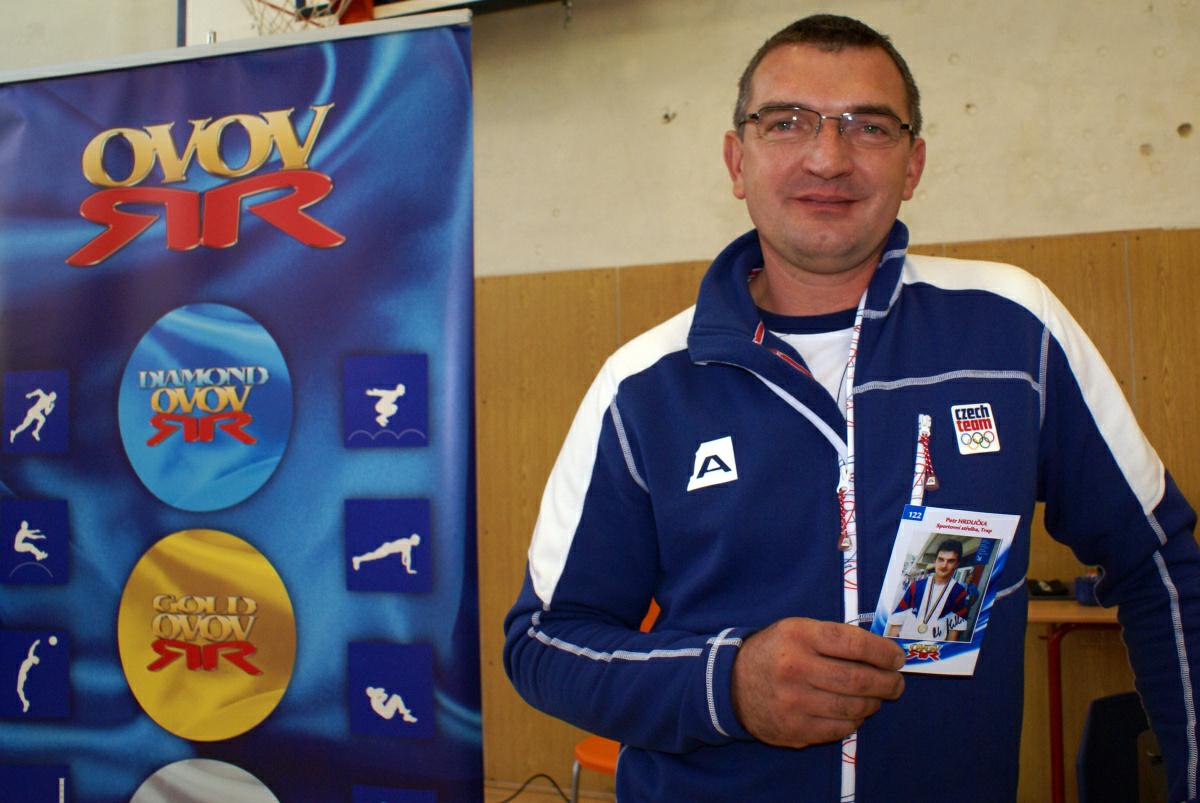
- Petr Hrdlička in 2012

Personal information
- Born: 23 December 1967 (age 58) Brno, Czechoslovakia
Medal record
Men's shooting
Representing Czechoslovakia
Olympic Games
Gold medal – first place	1992 Barcelona	Trap

Petr Hrdlička (born 23 December 1967) is a Czech sport shooter and Olympic champion for Czechoslovakia. He won a gold medal in trap shooting at the 1992 Summer Olympics in Barcelona. Hrdlička was born in Brno.
