= Alfredo Cuentas =

Mexican sports shooter

Personal information
- Nationality: Mexican
- Born: 20 October 1955 (age 69)

Sport
- Sport: Sports shooting

Alfredo Cuentas (born 20 October 1955) is a Mexican sports shooter. He competed in the mixed trap event at the 1988 Summer Olympics.
