= Thomas Knutsson =

Swedish sports shooter

Personal information
- Nationality: Swedish
- Born: 15 May 1958 (age 66); Filipstad, Sweden

Sport
- Sport: Sports shooting

Thomas Knutsson (born 15 May 1958) is a Swedish sports shooter. He competed in the mixed trap event at the 1992 Summer Olympics.
