= Horace Micallef =

Maltese sports shooter

Personal information
- Nationality: Maltese
- Born: 20 September 1959 (age 65)

Sport
- Sport: Sports shooting

Horace Micallef (born 20 September 1959) is a Maltese sports shooter. He competed in the mixed trap event at the 1992 Summer Olympics.
