= José Faria (sport shooter) =

Portuguese sports shooter (born 1957)

Personal information
- Nationality: Portuguese
- Born: 24 July 1957 (age 68)

Sport
- Sport: Sports shooting

José Faria (born 24 July 1957) is a Portuguese sports shooter. He competed in the mixed trap event at the 1984 Summer Olympics.
