= Rafael Axpe =

Spanish sport shooter

Rafael Axpe (born 23 February 1954) is a Spanish sport shooter. He competed at the Summer Olympics in 1988 and 1992. In 1988, he placed 11th in the mixed trap event, while in 1992, he tied for 33rd place in the mixed trap event.
