= Étienne Vivier =

Belgian sports shooter

Personal information
- Nationality: Belgian
- Born: 7 May 1962 (age 62); Mons, Belgium

Sport
- Sport: Sports shooting

Étienne Vivier (born 7 May 1962) is a Belgian sports shooter. He competed in the mixed trap event at the 1984 Summer Olympics.
