= George Haas III =

American sport shooter

George Haas III (born 23 March 1963) is an American former sport shooter who competed in the 1988 Summer Olympics.
