= Jay Waldron =

American sports shooter

Jay Waldron (born 4 March 1966) is an American former sport shooter who competed in the 1992 Summer Olympics.
