= Christophe Guelpa =

French sports shooter

Christophe Guelpa (born 25 June 1963) is a French former sport shooter who competed in the 1988 Summer Olympics.
