= Riccardo Berardino =

Italian footballer (born 1990)

Personal information
- Date of birth: 12 October 1990 (age 36)
- Place of birth: Andria, Italy
- Height: 1.70 m (5 ft 7 in)
- Position: Midfielder

Team information
- Current team: Unione Bisceglie

Senior career*
Years	Team	Apps	(Gls)
2007–2008	Vultur Rionero	25	(6)
2008–2009	Santegidiese	8	(0)
2009	Real Montecchio	9	(1)
2009–2010	Santegidiese	18	(4)
2010–2012	Chieti	61	(11)
2012–2013	Teramo	0	(0)
2013–2014	Chieti	35	(4)
2014–2015	Melfi	22	(3)
2015	Santarcangelo	10	(0)
2015–2016	Paganese	13	(0)
2016	Martina Franca	15	(2)
2016–2017	Fidelis Andria	14	(1)
2017–2018	Potenza	14	(3)
2019–	Unione Bisceglie		
- * Club domestic league appearances and goals as of 1 July 2018

Riccardo Berardino (born 12 October 1990) is an Italian professional footballer who currently plays for Unione Calcio Bisceglie.

== Biography ==
Born in Andria, Apulia region, Berardino started his career at Vultur Rionero, a local team in Eccellenza Basilicata (Italian sixth level until 2014). In 2008–09 season Berardino was signed by Abruzzo club Santegidiese for 2008–09 Serie D. (Italian fifth level until 2014) He moved further North for Marche club Real Montecchio in 2009–10 Serie D, however in November 2009 Berardino returned to Sant'Egidio alla Vibrata.

In 2010 Berardino was signed by Lega Pro Seconda Divisione club Chieti. The club entered 2012 promotion playoffs, losing to Paganese. Berardino was the starting attacking midfielder in 4–2–3–1 formation, after the suspension of Giuseppe Lacarra; in the first game Berardino was the substitute of Jonatan Alessandro; Berardino replaced Lorenzo Del Pinto in the second half of the last game.

In summer 2012 Berardino left for fellow Abruzzo club Teramo. On 31 January 2013 he returned to Chieti as free agent. Despite both clubs were in 2012–13 Lega Pro Seconda Divisione, Berardino only played 4 times in regular season, all for Chieti. In the playoffs Berardino was the substitute of Alessandro and starting attacking midfielder in 4–3–1–2 formation respectively. The club lost to L'Aquila in the first round, which eventually L'Aquila was the winner.

In December 2019, Berardino joined ASD Unione Calcio Bisceglie.
