= Motoharu Hirano =

Japanese sports shooter (born 1940)

Personal information
- Nationality: Japanese
- Born: 1 April 1940 (age 85)

Sport
- Sport: Sports shooting

Motoharu Hirano (平野 元治, Hirano Motoharu; born 1 April 1940) is a Japanese sports shooter. He competed in the mixed trap event at the 1984 Summer Olympics.
