= Anne MacKenzie (judge) =

Canadian judge

Anne MacKenzie is a judge of the Court of Appeal of British Columbia since January 1, 2012. She previously served as the Associate Chief Justice of the Supreme Court of British Columbia. MacKenzie graduated with a Bachelor of Arts in 1973 followed by a Bachelor of Laws in 1977 from the University of British Columbia in Vancouver. She articled with the firm of Guild Yule and Company, and upon her call to the bar joined the offices of the Department of Justice.

In 1990, she was appointed to the Provincial Court of British Columbia, and was elevated to the Supreme Court of British Columbia in 1996.

== Associate Chief Justice ==
MacKenzie was the first woman to be Associate Chief Justice of the Supreme Court of British Columbia and the third person ever to be appointed to Associate Chief Justice in the history of the Supreme Court. The associate chief justice is the second-ranked judge on the province's superior trial court.

In 2010, MacKenzie replaced Elizabeth Bennett as the jurist presiding over the corruption trails that resulted from the BC Legislature Raids.
