= Erik Bornmann =

Canadian political consultant

Erik Bornmann (also spelled Bornman), LL.B, B.Comm. (b. 20 May 1976 in Canada) was a key Crown witness in the corruption trial related to the BC Rail scandal. Bornmann is a former consultant and founding partner of Pilothouse Public Affairs. He has worked as a communications consultant in provincial and federal elections and as a strategist for the BC Liberal Party and the Liberal Party of Canada.

== BC Legislature raids ==
Bornmann was involved in events in late 2003 surrounding what has become known as the BC Legislature Raids. He is alleged to have illegally paid almost $30,000 to British Columbia government officials for private information. He is a key witness in a trial that pertains to the BC Legislature Raids.

A police raid took place on ministerial offices in the BC Legislature in December 2003 after the RCMP obtained search warrants from the BC Supreme Court, leading to charges against two former government employees, partly due to information provided to police by Bornmann. Later, in 2006, three more were charged.

Dave Basi, aide to former finance minister Gary Collins, and Robert Virk, assistant to former transport minister Judith Reid, faced six charges: demanding or accepting benefits including money, meals, travel and employment opportunities in connection with the bidding process for BC Rail, fraud and breach of trust, two counts of fraud of more than $5,000.
