= Kazumi Watanabe (sport shooter) =

Japanese sport shooter

Personal information
- Born: 30 October 1947 Kanagawa, Japan
- Died: 2 August 1996 (aged 48)
Medal record
Men's shooting
Representing Japan
Olympic Games
Silver medal – second place	1992 Barcelona	Trap

Kazumi Watanabe (渡辺和三, Watanabe Kazumi; 30 October 1947 – 2 August 1996) was a Japanese sport shooter who competed in the 1984 Summer Olympics, in the 1988 Summer Olympics, and in the 1992 Summer Olympics. He was born in Kanagawa
