= Corné Bornman =

South African sports shooter

Cornelius Jansen (Neels) Bornman
Personal information
- Nationality: South African
- Born: 5 February 1942
- Died: 7 October 2021 (aged 79)

Sport
- Sport: Sports shooting

Cornelius Jansen (Neels) Bornman (5 February 1942 – 7 October 2021) was a South African sports shooter. He was born in Bloemfontein, South Africa and attended Grey College from 1942 to 1960. He competed in the Olympic Trap event at the 1992 Summer Olympics in Barcelona, becoming the only South African to have represented South Africa in all three Olympic Clay Target Shooting disciplines, Olympic Skeet, Olympic Trap and Olympic Double Trap. He first represented South Africa in 1974 and his last appearance was in 2008, a span of 34 years. He died on 7 October 2021.
