= Jean Labatut (sport shooter) =

Brazilian sports shooter (born 1971)

Personal information
- Born: 14 March 1971 (age 54); São Paulo, Brazil

Sport
- Sport: Sports shooting

Jean Labatut (born 14 March 1971) is a Brazilian sports shooter. He competed in the men's trap event at the 1996 Summer Olympics.
