= Armand Dousemont =

Luxembourgish sports shooter

Personal information
- Nationality: Luxembourgish
- Born: 15 July 1952 (age 72); Luxembourg, Luxembourg

Sport
- Sport: Sports shooting

Armand Dousemont (born 15 July 1952) is a Luxembourgish sports shooter. He competed in two events at the Atlanta 1996 Summer Olympics. On 1 June 2005 he came in joint second (with Frans Pace) at the Trap competition.
