= Kim Kon-il =

South Korean sport shooter

Kim Kon-il (born 19 October 1966) is a South Korean sport shooter who competed in the 1988 Summer Olympics and in the 1992 Summer Olympics.
