= Timo Nieminen (sport shooter) =

Finnish sports shooter (born 1951)

Personal information
- Nationality: Finnish
- Born: 2 March 1951 (age 75) Orimattila, Finland

Sport
- Sport: Sports shooting

Timo Nieminen (born 2 March 1951) is a Finnish sports shooter. He competed at the 1984 Summer Olympics and the 1988 Summer Olympics.
