= Sherif Saleh =

Egyptian sports shooter

Personal information
- Nationality: Egyptian
- Born: 12 November 1954 (age 70)

Sport
- Sport: Sports shooting

Sherif Saleh (born 12 November 1954) is an Egyptian sports shooter. He competed at the 1984 Summer Olympics, the 1988 Summer Olympics and the 1992 Summer Olympics.
