= Dmitry Monakov =

Soviet sport shooter

Medal record

Men's shooting

Representing Soviet Union

Olympic Games
Gold medal – first place	1988 Seoul	Trap

ISSF World Shooting Championships
Gold medal – first place	1987 Valencia	Trap
Silver medal – second place	1987 Valencia	Team

Representing Ukraine

ISSF World Shooting Championships
Gold medal – first place	1994 Milan	Trap

Dmitry Vitalyevich Monakov (Ukrainian: Дмитро Віталійович Монаков, Russian: Дмитрий Витальевич Монаков; 17 February 1963 in Kiev, Soviet Union – 21 November 2007 in Kyiv, Ukraine) was a Soviet and Ukrainian shooter. He was an Olympic champion in 1988 in trap shooting.

Monakov won the Olympic (1988), World (1987, 1994) and European (1988) championships. He participated in the 1996 Olympics on the Ukrainian team but didn't win any medal. Afterwards, he was a coach of the national team.

Monakov died on 21 November 2007 from a thrombus problem.

He was buried at Berkovtsi Cemetery.

== Sources ==
- Evans, Hilary; Gjerde, Arild; Heijmans, Jeroen; Mallon, Bill; et al. "Dmytro Monakov". Olympics at Sports-Reference.com. Sports Reference LLC. Archived from the original on 2012-02-11.
