= Elizabeth Bennett (judge) =

Canadian judge

Justice Elizabeth Bennett KC is judge of the British Columbia Court of Appeal. During her term on the Supreme Court of British Columbia, she presided over two notable corruption trials.

== Early life and career ==
Bennett was educated at Simon Fraser University and the University of British Columbia Law School. She served with the Canadian Forces Primary Reserves, 6th Field Engineer Squadron. She was named a King's Counsel in 1994 and appointed to the Supreme Court of BC in 1997. She was appointed to the Court Martial Appeal Court of Canada on June 23, 1999.

== Casinogate ==
On August 29, 2002, she acquitted former premier Glen Clark of all criminal charges related to home renovations and other personal benefits received from a constituent, Dimitrios Pilarinos, who was applying for a casino license. The judge said Clark exercised poor judgment but ruled that "there is nothing in his conduct that crosses the line from an act of folly to behaviour calling for criminal sanctions." The ruling came five years and a day after her appointment to the Supreme Court on August 28, 1997. The "Casinogate" scandal came to public attention when news media filmed the Royal Canadian Mounted Police (RCMP) conducting a search warrant inside the private home of the then-Premier.

== Graham extradition ==
In 2004, Bennett ruled that John Graham could be extradited to the United States for trial for the 1975 murder of Anna Mae Aquash, one of the most prominent members of the American Indian Movement.

== BC Rail corruption trial ==
In 2007, she began proceedings on the Basi-Virk Affair where the minister of finance's politically appointed assistant was charged with the sale of benefits related to the province's sale of BC Rail, the publicly owned railway. The scandal came to public attention when news media filmed the RCMP conducting a search warrant inside the BC Legislature building. The trial is ongoing.

On May 15, 2009, she was appointed by federal justice minister and attorney-general Rob Nicholson to the British Columbia Court of Appeal, elevating her from the BC Supreme Court. She remained on the Basi-Virk case still in Supreme Court, presiding over the pre-trial hearings until replaced by Anne MacKenzie. Special Prosecutor Bill Berardino said her appointment will not affect the timing of the case, nor slow it down further.

== Publications ==
Justice Bennett co-authored the 2006 revisions for a guide for judges on giving instructions to the jury, the Canadian Criminal Jury Instructions (CRIMJI)
