= Frans Peeters =

Belgian sport shooter

Medal record

Shooting

Representing Belgium

Olympic Games
Bronze medal – third place	1988 Seoul	Trap

Frans Peeters (born August 30, 1956) is a sport shooter from Belgium. He won the Bronze Medal in Trap shooting in the 1988 Summer Olympics in Seoul.
