= British Columbia Legislature raids =

2000s political scandal in British Columbia, Canada

The British Columbia Legislature raids (also known as Railgate after Watergate) resulted from search warrants executed in 2003 on the British Columbia Parliament Buildings, the seat of the British Columbia Legislature, the government of the Canadian province of British Columbia. It became a collective term for the associated criminal proceedings and ensuing controversies. Court hearings stemming from the raids began in Supreme Court of British Columbia in April 2007. The proceedings brought to light questions concerning the propriety of the sale of railway company BC Rail. In October 2010, ministerial aides Dave Basi and Bob Virk pleaded guilty to breach of trust and receiving a benefit for leaking information about the BC Rail bidding process.

== Drug sting "Everywhichway" leads to government aides ==
According to the RCMP, the raids arose from information uncovered during a drug sting. In 2003, the RCMP were monitoring Dave Basi's conversations on his home, government, and cellular phones, as well as his e-mails. At that time the police were focused on breaking up a marijuana and cocaine smuggling ring between British Columbia and Ontario run by his cousin JissSingh Basi.

During the police investigation of Basi's activities, investigators became interested in Basi's dealings as Ministerial Assistant to then Finance Minister Gary Farrell-Collins. A second investigation was launched that had no connection to drug related activities but rather to the sale of benefits in regard to the tendering process for the sale of BC Rail.

On December 28, 2003, a series of search warrants was executed at various locations throughout the Lower Mainland and in Victoria. There were four separate applications by the RCMP in 2004 to obtain warrants, and according to the CBC these were executed at nine separate premises including the Parliament Buildings in Victoria. As a result, allegations of bribery were made (including money and the offer of potential employment in return for confidential government information).

The sale of BC Rail involved a tax indemnity. This was structured so that if CN would not have been refunded $415 million from the Federal Government, then the Province would be required to return this amount to CN. This had the effect of reducing the sale price of BC Rail from $1.05 billion to under $500 million, thereby in essence short-changing taxpayers more than $550 million. (This is in addition to $750 million cash payments and $250 million in direct tax credits, as noted in the section on Patrick Kinsella below.) The BC Rail tax indemnity was taken off the Public Accounts in January 2005, before the May 2005 election, when it was reclassified a contingent liability.

=== BC Rail link ===
On April 3, 2006, a Justice of the British Columbia Supreme Court ordered the further release of various documents used by police to obtain the search warrants served on individuals linked to the raids.

Further charges were laid against two Victoria area developers.

=== Agricultural Land Commission connection ===
Basi has also been charged for accepting $50,000 in connection with the Agricultural Land Commission.

=== Liberal "insiders" ===
Several of the people cited by online commentators or certain reporters in the story surrounding the raid are politically active people who had come into contact with Basi. Examples include provincial ministers, staff or officials in the Liberal Party of Canada or the Paul Martin leadership campaign.

Search warrants were executed at several locations in addition to the BC Legislature. The Vancouver home office of Erik Bornmann, the Vancouver home of Bruce Clark (brother of Christy Clark, CKNW 980 talk show host), and the offices of Pilothouse public affairs in Victoria in December 2003. It has been reported that Erik Bornmann, Brian Kieran and Jamie Elmhirst will testify for the Crown. The RCMP also attended Ms. Clark's home that she shared with her ex-husband Mark Marissen.

The RCMP made it very clear that no elected officials were implicated in their investigation, and also provided a letter to Marissen (Paul Martin's BC Campaign Chair) confirming that he was also not implicated in any way and that they came to his house without a search warrant to seek his help because they thought he might be the "innocent recipient" of emails related to Virk's and Basi's resumes, because it was alleged that they were seeking job recommendations for federal political employment in Ottawa. Basi was an active volunteer for the Paul Martin campaign in British Columbia, who recruited many members of the Indo-Canadian community to the Liberal Party to vote in the leadership process. This has led to rampant speculation and innuendo as government critics attempt to link Basi's activities to federal and provincial politicians and operatives, and spread "guilt by association". Part of this speculation is fuelled by comments made to the media at the time of the raids by the officer in charge, that organized crime and corruption were present in "the highest levels of the government".

=== Charges laid ===
In December 2004 three men were charged in connection with this investigation and in 2006 two more men were charged.

Those charged include:

- David Basi
- Robert Virk
- Aneal Basi
- Tony Young
- James Duncan

=== Legality of warrants ===
Complications in the case included controversy as to whether the police may have misled a judge in the course of obtaining warrants for the investigation which involved eavesdropping on conversations between the premier and the finance minister. Twice the warrants were rejected on grounds of privilege, with the third warrant issued without naming the premises, which were the Legislature Buildings.

== Developments in 2009 ==
=== Documents released under the Freedom of Information Act ===
The preliminary hearings into eventual criminal court proceedings were kept sealed from the public until opened up in the public's interest, and by requests from defence council, in the fall of 2008 by the presiding justice, Elizabeth Bennett, who struck down the court ban in the grounds of the importance of an open court in regard to the importance of the case to the public interest, contrary to the objections of the government-appointed Special Prosecutor. On February 25, 2009, Judge Bennett released 8000 pages of documents relating to the legislature raids to the New Democrat Official Opposition.

The documents produced attention immediately, first to what appeared to be BC Liberal Party fundraising activities originating from the Finance Minister's office, then to the BC Liberal government's strategy for dominating the media discourse and neutralizing question period.

On March 6, 2009, after raising these two stories the BC New Democratic Party caucus released the documents to the public through their website.

=== Kinsella connection ===
Shortly after the BC New Democratic Caucus won access to the 8000 pages of BC Rail documents, their researchers uncovered a link between long-time BC Liberal Party insider Patrick Kinsella and BC Rail while looking through public documents available at the legislative library. The documents showed that between 2002 and 2004, BC Rail paid $297,000 to the group of companies owned by Kinsella.

The discovered documents were first aired in question period on Tuesday, March 10, 2009. When questioned by New Democratic Party justice critic, Leonard Krog, about what Kinsella was paid by BC Rail to do, the Attorney General, Wally Oppal, claimed that "the issue relating to BC Rail is before the Supreme Court of British Columbia, and we will not comment on the matter."

Kinsella's company, the Progressive Group, issued a statement claiming that Kinsella "was engaged by BC Rail to assist in understanding and interpreting the Core Review Process as to its potential impact on the Corporation", while on BC Rail's payroll.

Questioned outside of the legislature Oppal said that he had no idea if Kinsella's activities were connected to the BC Rail trial. Soon after, a defence lawyer involved in the trial alleged that Kinsella was working for both CN Rail and BC Rail in the time before the $1-billion sale of BC Rail to CN was finalized.

Kinsella wrote the BC Liberal Party election platform for the 2003 and 2005 elections. Kinsella's involvement in the political corruption trial has led observers to draw a link between the BC Rail scandal and Gordon Campbell.

According to an email cited by defense lawyer Kevin McCullough, Kinsella may have interceded with Premier Gordon Campbell's chief of staff to keep the sale of BC Rail to CN from "going off the tracks."

Kinsella is alleged to have been involved in entering the $505 million BC Rail tax indemnity (refund) on the books at 255 million.

The sale of BC Rail included a $505 million BC Rail tax indemnity on top of $750 million cash and $250 million in direct tax credits. Under the terms of the indemnity, if CN would not have been refunded the amount of the indemnity from the Federal Government, then the Province would be required to return this amount. This reduced the sale price of BC Rail from $1.05 billion to roughly $500 million, thereby benefiting private shareholders of CN, albeit at the expense of the public at large. The BC Rail tax indemnity was taken off the Public Accounts in January 2005, before the May 2005 election, when it was reclassified a contingent liability.

The BC Rail sale Annual Report was defective and did not cite the indemnity, and recorded these tax credits at zero book value.

== Developments in 2010 ==
=== BC Rail corruption trial ===
The BC Rail corruption trial (Her Majesty the Queen v. Basi), Virk Basi and commonly known as the Basi-Virk Trial, started on May 17, 2010. The trial was originally scheduled by BC Supreme Court officials to last around six weeks.

Canadian media have expressed frustration at the time it has taken to get this case to trial.

A publication ban by the presiding judge put most of the BC Rail trial – from its beginning to July 6, 2010, when the court rose for the summer, out of reach of the media and out of the public eye.

==== First witness: Chief of Staff Martyn Brown ====
Premier Gordon Campbell's chief of staff, Martyn Brown, was the first witness to appear before the jury in the BC Rail trial.

==== End of trial ====
October 2010 – Defendants Dave Basi and Bob Virk agreed to change their plea to guilty on a reduced number of charges. For more info related to this, see Timeline of the British Columbia Legislature raids#2010
