= Navigation School, Copenhagen =

Building in Copenhagen, Denmark

The Navigation School
- Navigationsskolen
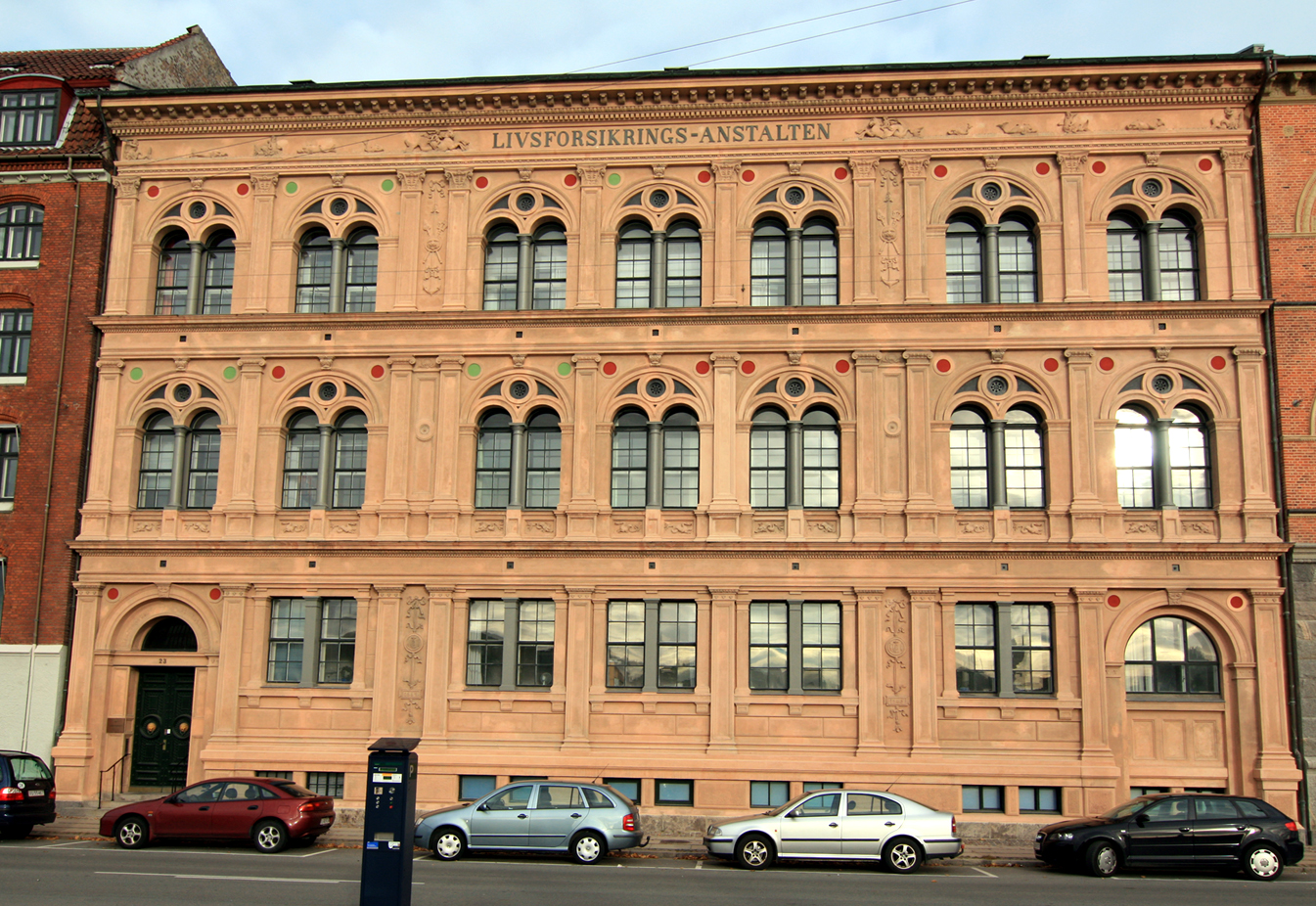
- The former Navigation School

General information
- Architectural style: Historicism
- Location: Copenhagen, Denmark16.26
- Coordinates: 55°40′35.06″N 12°35′16.26″E
- Construction started: 1663
- Completed: 1665

Design and construction
- Architect: Ferdinand Meldahl

The Navigation School (Danish: Navigationsskolen) is a former educational institution in Copenhagen, Denmark. Its Historicist building on Havnegade (Havnegade 23) is listed.

== History ==
=== The first navigation schools ===
The first navigation school was established by Christian IV in the building which was later converted into Church of Holmen in 1619. The building moved to Bremerholm in 1647. The Royal Navigation School became a naval officers' academy, therefore the Shipowners' Guild established a new Navigation School in 1585.

=== The new school ===
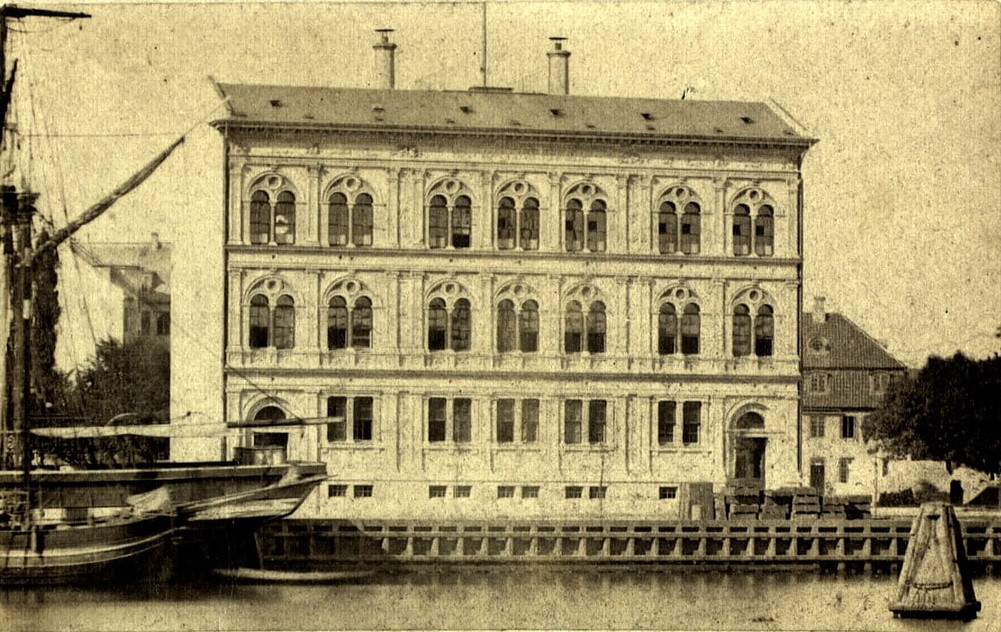
The Navigation School photographed by Vilhelm Tillge before it was flanked by adjoining buildings

The Association for the Promotion of the Shipping Industry (Danish: Foreningen til Søfartens Fremme) was founded in 1842. In 1852, it took over Copenhagen Navigation School from the Shipowners' Guild and appointed Emil Tuxen as its new director.

The school was initially based in the Shipowners' Guild House in Lille Kongensgade. In 1859, Ferdinand Meldahl was charged with the design of a new building for the school on Havnegade in the new Gammelholm district. The project was delayed by the need to find an additional tenant but the Association for the Promotion of the Shipping Industry finally purchased the lot after closing a contract with the life insurance company Livsrenteanstalten. The foundation stone was set by Christian IX on 2 July 1864 and he was also present when the building was inaugurated on 1 September 1865.

It was one of the first buildings in Copenhagen, and was heated by central heating. A large iron staircase connected the three floors. Auditoria and a room for board meetings was located on the first floor. The second floor contained classrooms and the school library, while the ground floor housed the insurance company Livrenteanstalten (later Statsanstalten for Livsforsikring).

=== Later history ===
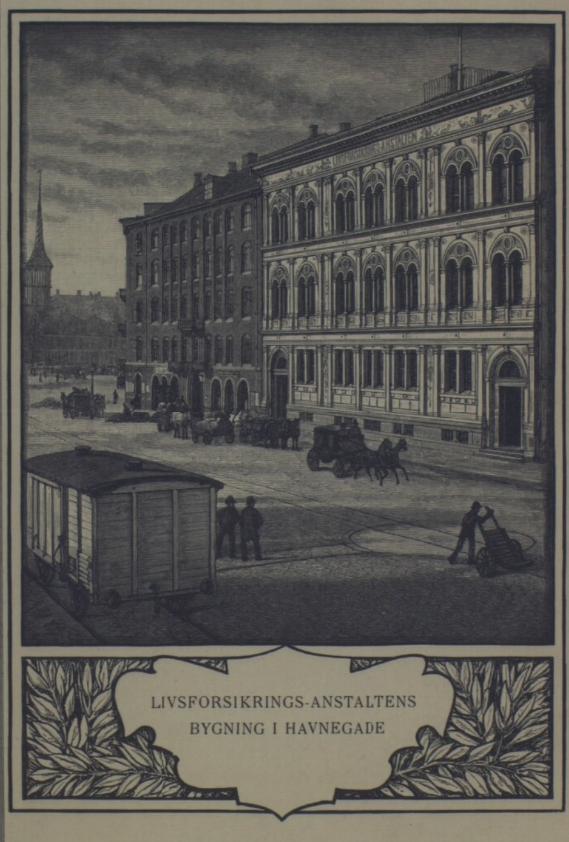
Livforsikrings-Anstalten's building in Havnegade

The school used the building until it was sold to Livsforsikringsanstalten in 1891. The school then moved to a building in nearby Peder Skramsgade (No. 7) and two years later to the Shipowners' Association's building on Holmens Kanal (N. 11).

The Navigation School's former building on Havnegade was expanded by Martin Borch in 1907. It has contained government offices since 1953. The building was listed in 1981.

== Architecture ==
The three-storey building is designed in the Historicist style with inspiration from Venetian Renaissance architecture such as Ca' Vendramin Calergi.
