= Nordisk Frøkontor =

Building in Copenhagen

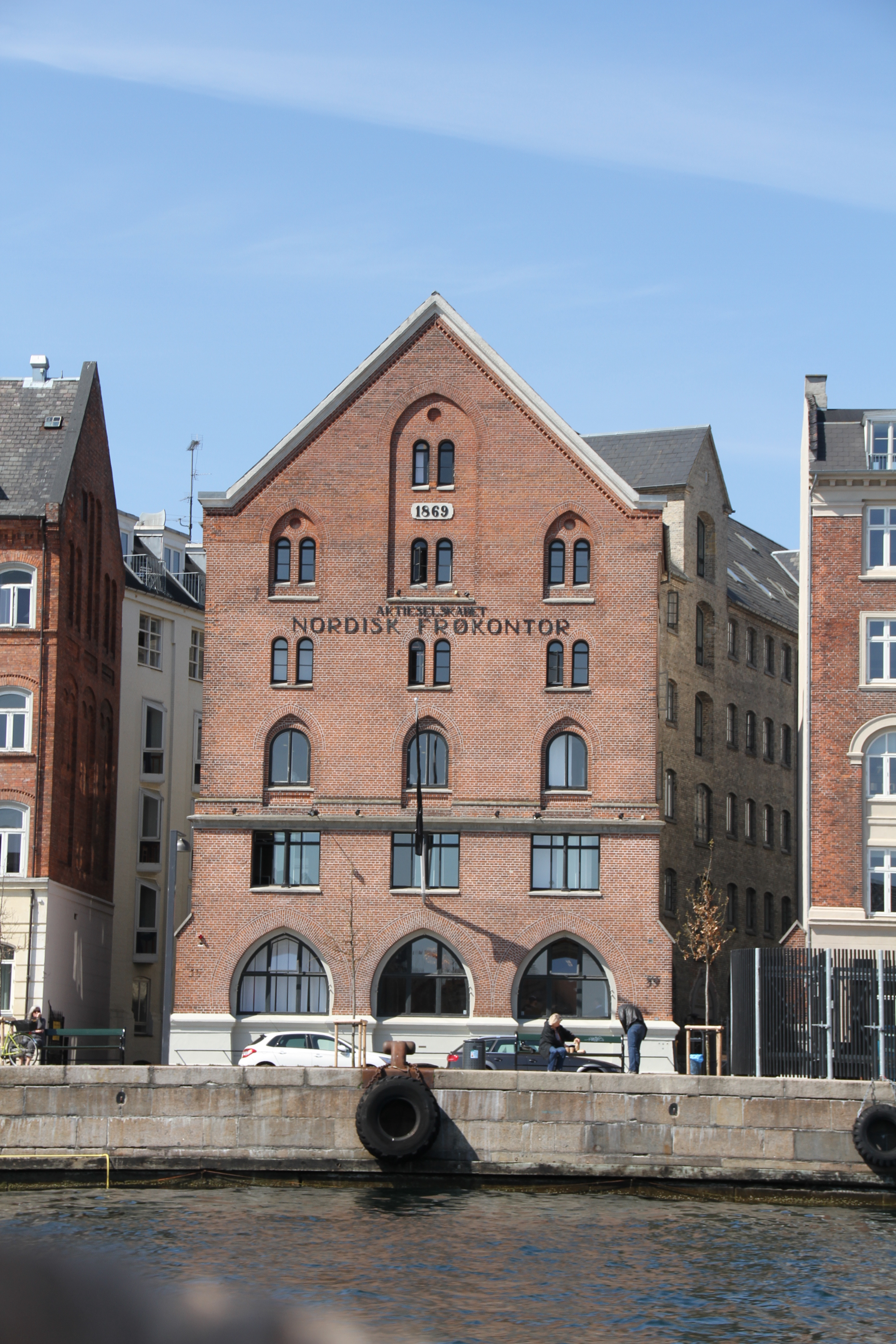
- Interactive map of the Nordisk Frøkontor area

General information
- Location: Copenhagen, Denmark
- Coordinates: 55°40′38.48″N 12°35′25.64″E
- Completed: 1869

Nordisk Frøkontor (lit. 'Nordic Seed Office') was a Danish wholesaler of seeds founded in 1879 at Havnegade in the Gammelholm neighbourhood of central Copenhagen, Denmark. Its former headquarters at Havnegade 39, a listed warehouse which predates it with 10 years, has been converted into serviced offices.

== History ==
The warehouse at No. 39 was built in 1869 to design by J. Kern. It was originally used for the storage of ship paint. It was built as part of the redevelopment of the former Gammelholm naval dockyards.

The company Nordisk Frøkontor was founded by Ludvig Søren Lyngbye in 1879. In 1891, Boldt Andreas Jørgensen became a partner in the company, and Lyngbye left it the following year. Boldt Andreas owned it until 1917 when it was converted into an aktieselskab. In 1950, I. Leser Pedersen was CEO of the company while Supreme Court attorney Hans Madsen was chairman of the board.

Olsen & Ahlmann was based in the building in 1919.

== Building ==
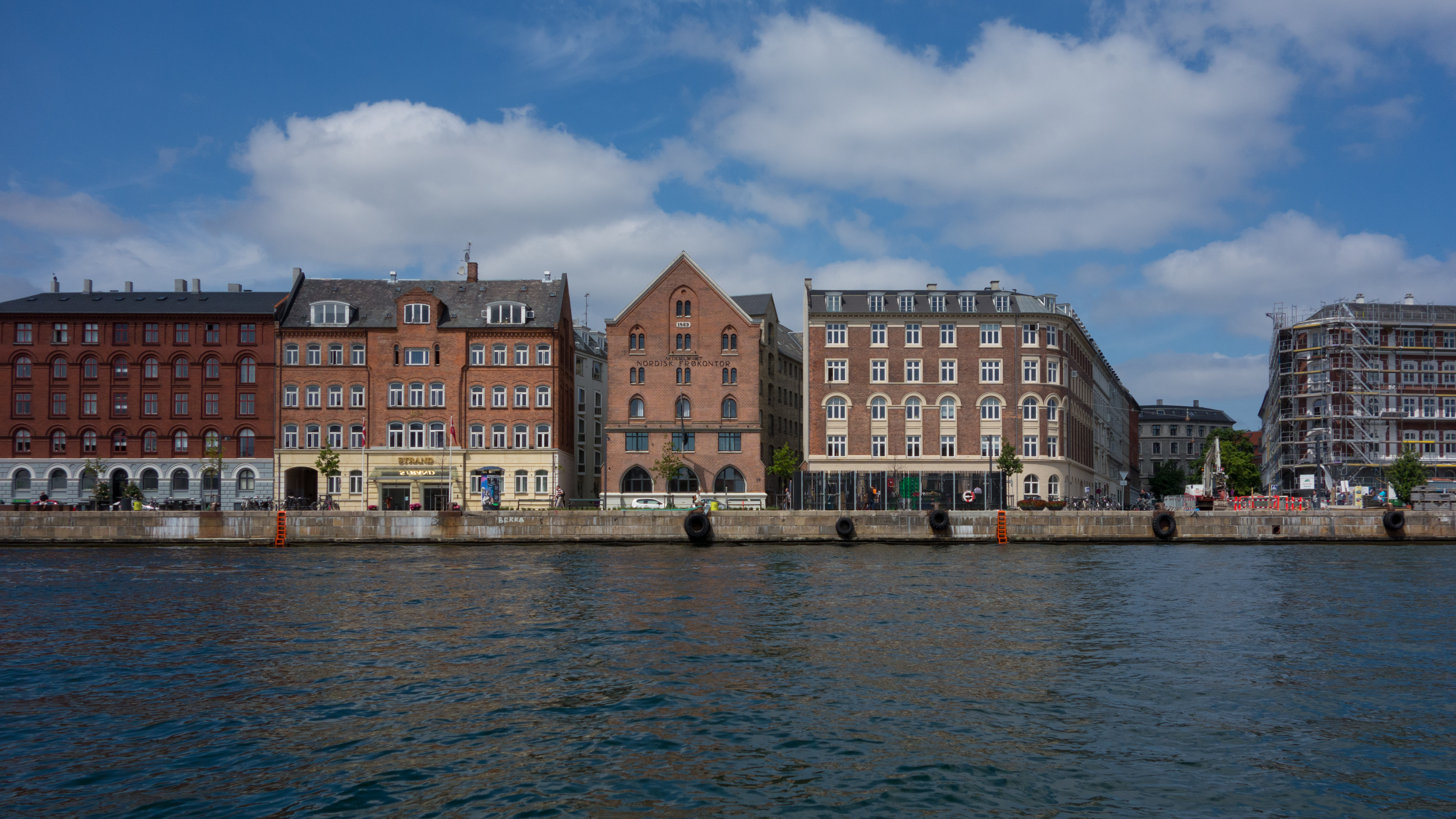
Havnegade

Nordisk Frøkontor's name is still seen on the facade of the building. A passageway next to the building opens to a yard and a former warehouse on its rear.

== Today ==
The building is now owned by Brink Serviced Offices and is operated as serviced offices under the name Business Center Havnegade .

== See also ==
- J. E. Ohlsens Enkes
