= Niels Juels Gade =

Street in Copenhagen, Denmark

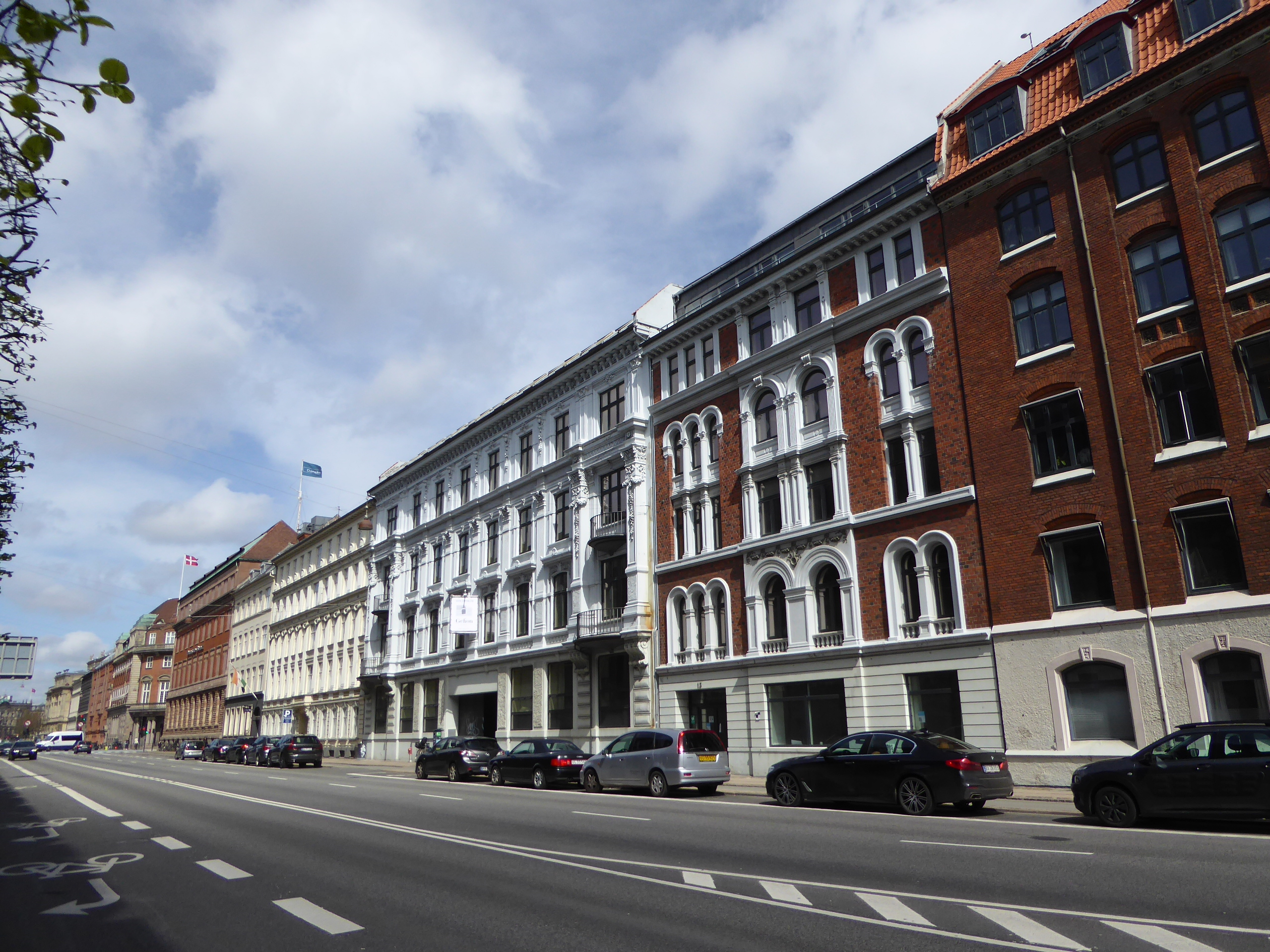
- Northern side of Niels Juels Gade.
- Location: Indre By, Copenhagen, Denmark
- Coordinates: 55°40′37″N 12°35′12″E

Niels Juels Gade is a street in Indre By, Copenhagen, which runs from Holmens Kanal to Havnegade. The street is an extension of Christian IV's Bro to Christians Brygge and together with them forms part of Ring 2. Along the entire southern side of the street is Danmarks Nationalbank. On the northern side, there are a number of apartment buildings, which are primarily used for business. Furthermore, the Nigerien embassy is located in the street. The street is named after the naval hero Niels Juel (1629–1697).

== History ==
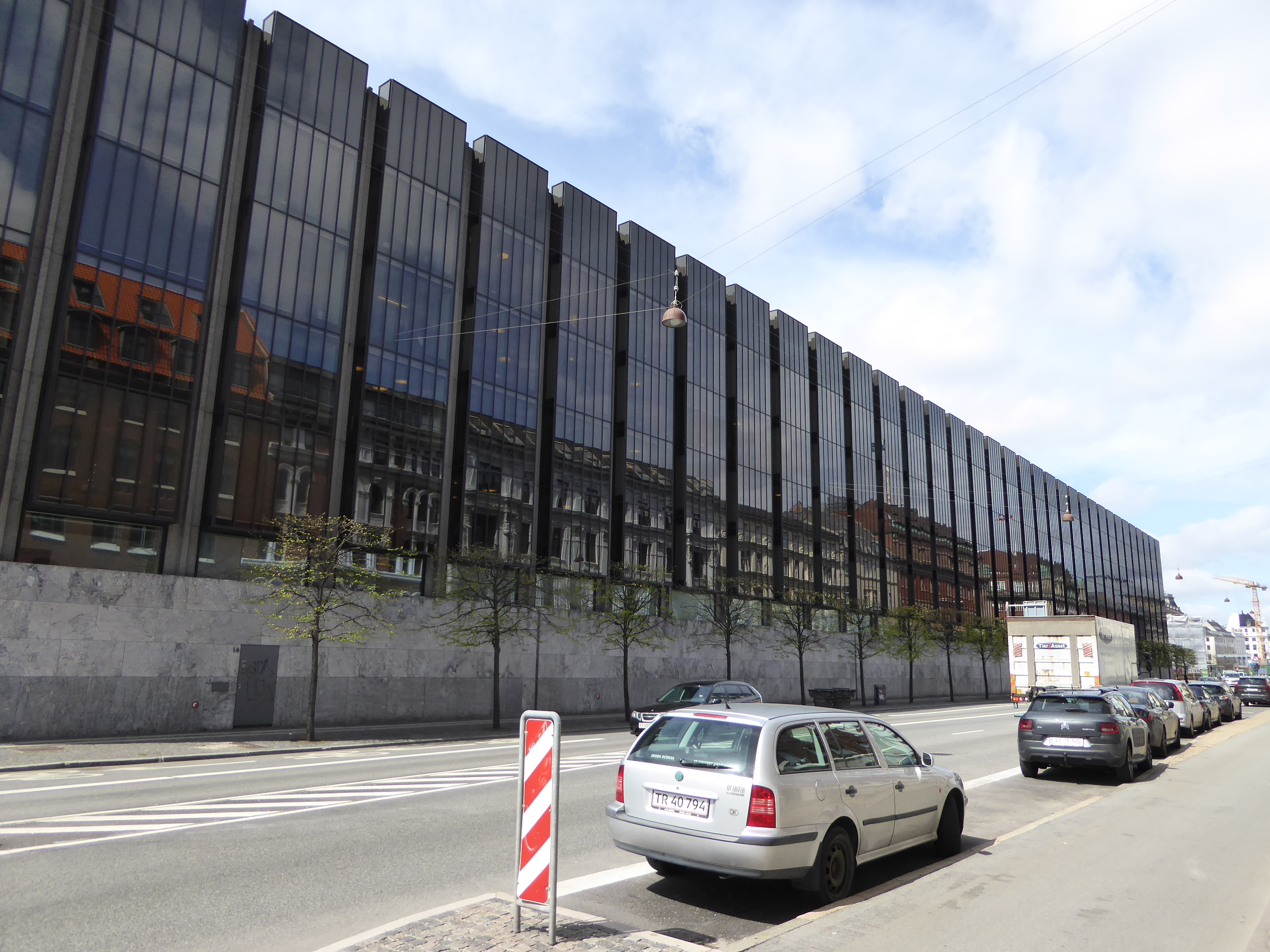
Danmarks Nationalbank building on the south side of the street.

Niels Juels Gade is located in the neighborhood of Gammelholm. The area was part of Orlogsværftet until 1859, but was then developed with apartment buildings in the 1860s and 1870s. In connection with this, nine new streets were laid out, predominantly named after naval heroes and theater figures. Niels Juels Gade was thus named after Admiral Niels Juel (1629–1697) in 1864. He led the Danish fleet during the Scanian War and is particularly known for his victory in the Battle of Køge Bay in 1677. In 1881, a statue of him made by Theobald Stein in the middle of the intersection with Holmens Kanal.

On the southern corner of Niels Juels Gade and Holmens Kanal, a residential property was built according to drawings by Theodor Sørensen in 1865–1866. In 1869, however, it became Hotel Kongen af Danmark. The hotel was well described with a cozy restaurant and many permanent residents. During World War II, however, things went back for the hotel, which was gradually reduced to a pension. Next to it on Holmens Kanal, a new headquarters for Nationalbank was built in 1865–1870. However, there was no more space, so after building an extension on the corner of Havnegadethey began to buy up the adjacent properties between Havnegade, Niels Juels Gade and Holmens Kanal. Initially, they were set up as offices, but the idea was eventually to demolish them in favor of a new bank building.

In 1961, an architectural competition was announced for a new building for Nationalbank, which was won by Arne Jacobsen. As the bank had to be in operation throughout the construction period, the construction had to be done in stages. It started in the north in 1964, where, among other things, the Hotel Kongen af Danmark was demolished. The rest of the southern side of Niels Juels Gade was also gradually cleared, including the Schultz Forlag sbuilding in no. 10–12, which they had built in 1872. The combined Nationalbank was completed in 1978. Along Niels Juels Gade is the five-storey main building with a plinth wall in Norwegian marble on the ground floor and dark-tinted glass on the other floors, like the houses on the other side of the street is reflected in. Inside the main building, there are two light gardens with roof gardens on top of the ground floor, so that daylight can enter the building. On the other hand, there are no doors on this side of the building, as the main entrance is on Havnegade. On the other hand, there are a number of trees along the bank on Niels Juels Gade.
