= Christian IV's Arsenal =

Coordinates: 55°40′28″N 12°34′49″E

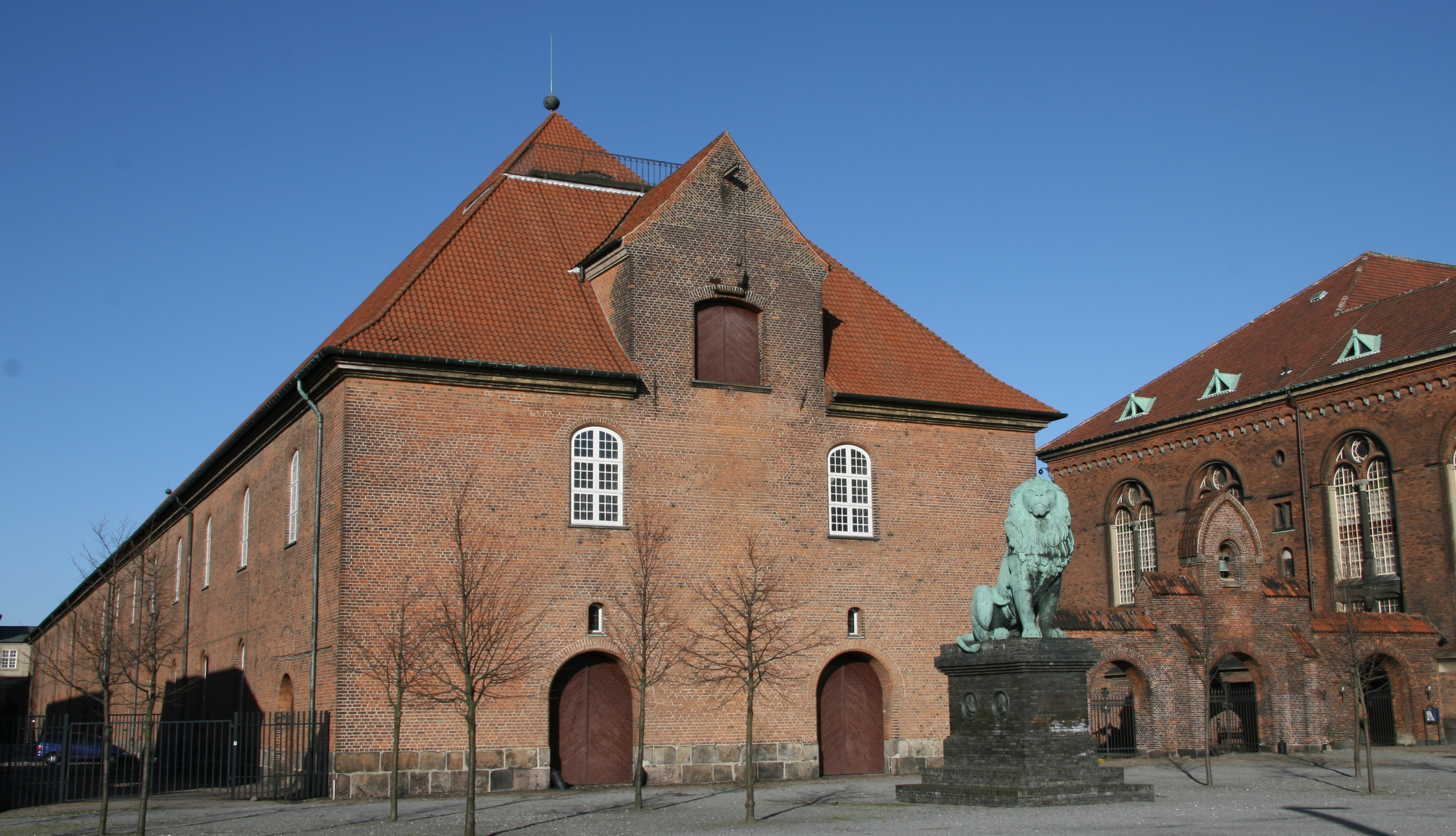
- Interactive map of the Christian IV's Arsenal area

General information
- Architectural style: renaissance
- Location: Copenhagen, Denmark
- Construction started: 1598
- Completed: 1604
- Client: Christian IV

Christian IV's Arsenal (Danish: Christian IV's Tøjhus), is a historic building on Slotsholmen in central Copenhagen, Denmark. It was built by Christian IV of Denmark in 1604 as part of a grand scheme for the construction of a new naval harbour. The arsenal, along with several other buildings, surrounded the harbour basin which was connected to the main harbour by a narrow canal. Later, when ships became too large to enter the harbour, the fleet moved to Bremerholm and the decommissioned naval harbour was later filled in.

Today Christian IV's Arsenal houses the Tøjhus Museum, a museum of weapons and military history, while the site of the former naval harbour has become the Royal Library Garden.

== History ==
=== Construction of the new naval harbour ===
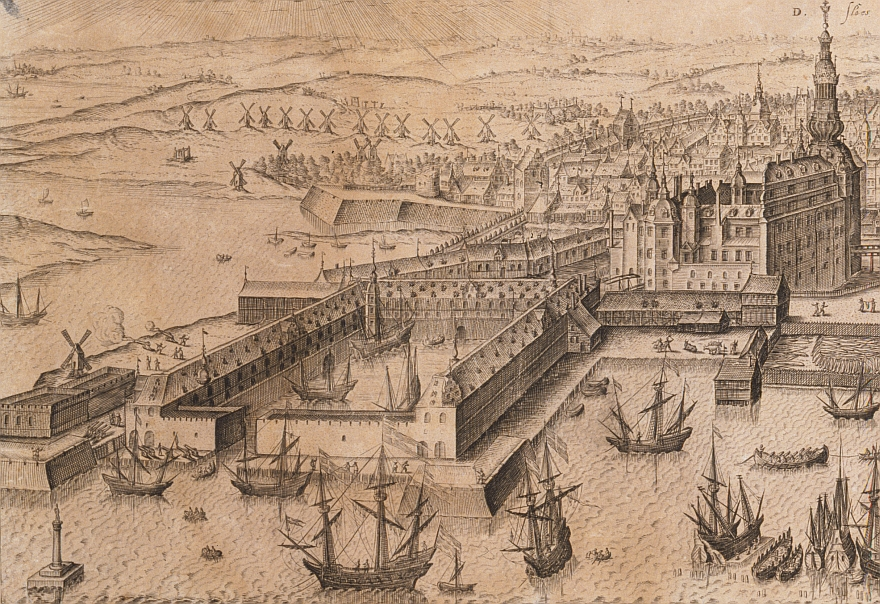
Christian IV's Arsenal Dock in 1611.

Shortly after King Christian IV was crowned, he decided to re-arm. The rivalry with Sweden for control over the Baltic Sea called for a strong fleet with a well protected base. He therefore decided to build a new naval harbour at Slotsholmen next to Copenhagen Castle which used to be located where Christiansborg Palace stands today.

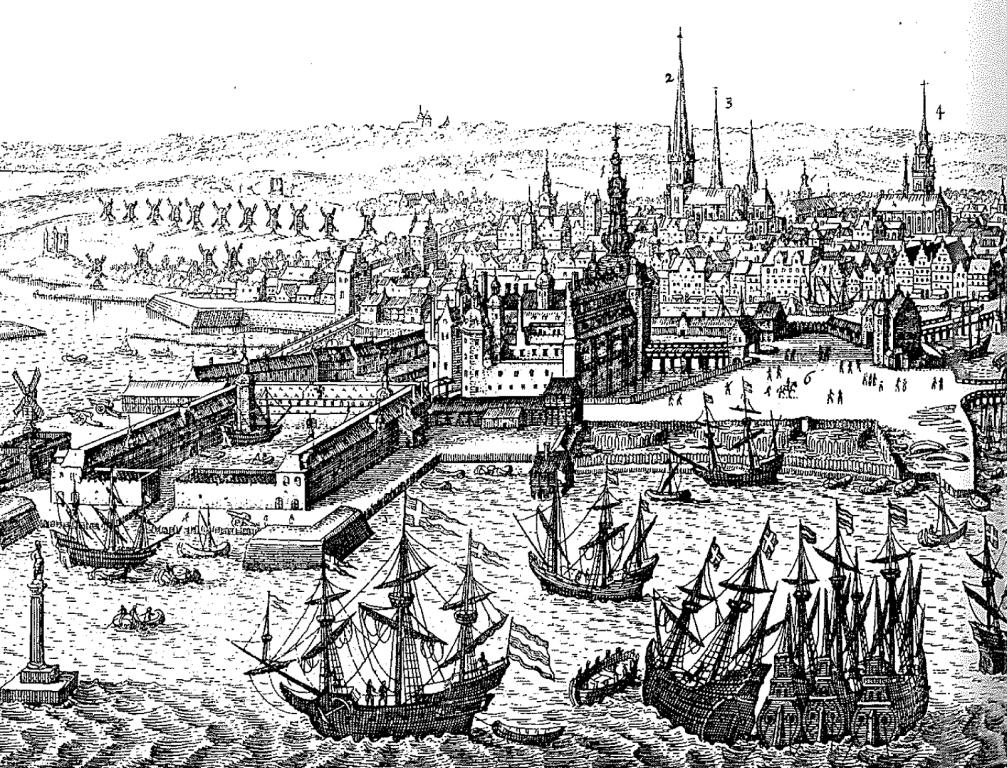
The Arsenal Dock at Slotsholmen

There had been an arsenal on the site for half a century but it was a fairly small, half-timbered building, one of several such arsenals spread across the city, and it was now outdated. In 1598, the king charged Bernt Petersen who had just completed the large tower at Koldinghus, with the commission. Six years later a huge new arsenal was completed, 163 metres (535 ft) long and 24 metres (79 ft) wide with walls three metres (9.8 ft) thick at the base. Next to it, Proviantgården, a supply depot was built with the same length and design but a bit narrower.

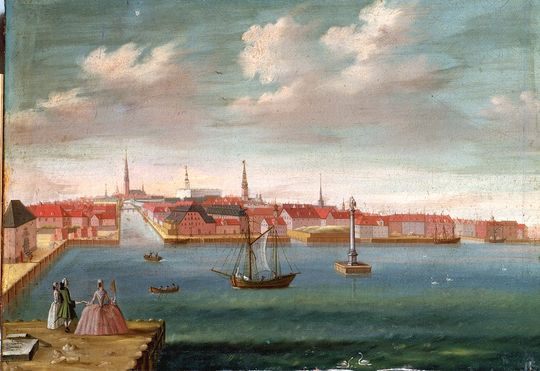
The entrance to the Arsenal Dock and the statue of Leda and the swan to the rightm painting by Johannes Rach, c. 1750

It was between these two buildings that the new harbour was to be constructed. A local contractor, Melchior Spangenberg, was commissioned to dig out the harbour for a price of 1,800 thaler, a load of rye, a load of barley and a barrel of butter. The harbour basin was to have an area of more than one-half hectare (1.2 acres) and a depth of four metres (13 ft). A canal, 125 metres (410 ft) long and also four metres (13 ft) deep, was to connect it to the coast.

To protect the mouth of the harbour, two more buildings, the Galley House and the Sulphor House, were constructed on either side of the canal, each serving other practical purposes relating to the new naval complex.

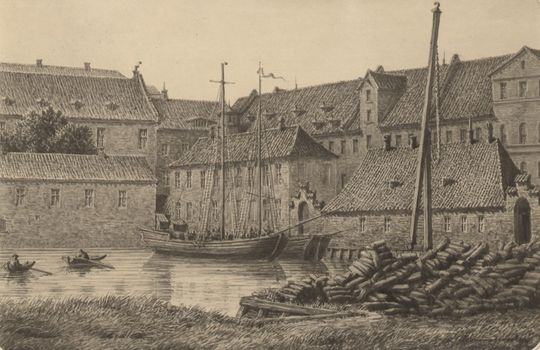
The Arsenal Dock and the Supplies Building, painting by Christian Hetsch

The entire complex was completed around 1610. Ships could berth along either the arsenal or the supply depot and be loded and unloaded through gates facing the water. The complex also had its own bakery and brewery today known as Christian IV's Brewhouse even though the building outdates him and originally served defensive purposes. When the brewhouse was completed, the brewer was provided with a large number of discarded mail sleeves for the scrubbing of brew kettles. Mail armour was no longer of practical use in the event of war and might just as well find new applications.

Outside the entrance to the new harbour, a sculpture of Leda and the swan was mounted on a tall column constructed on a sandbar known as the Mermaid Bar because sightings of mermaids were supposed to be particularly common there. The sculpture served as a landmark for the city until it was dismantled in 1795 to make more room for the increasing ship traffic in the harbour.

=== Decommissioning of the harbour and later history ===
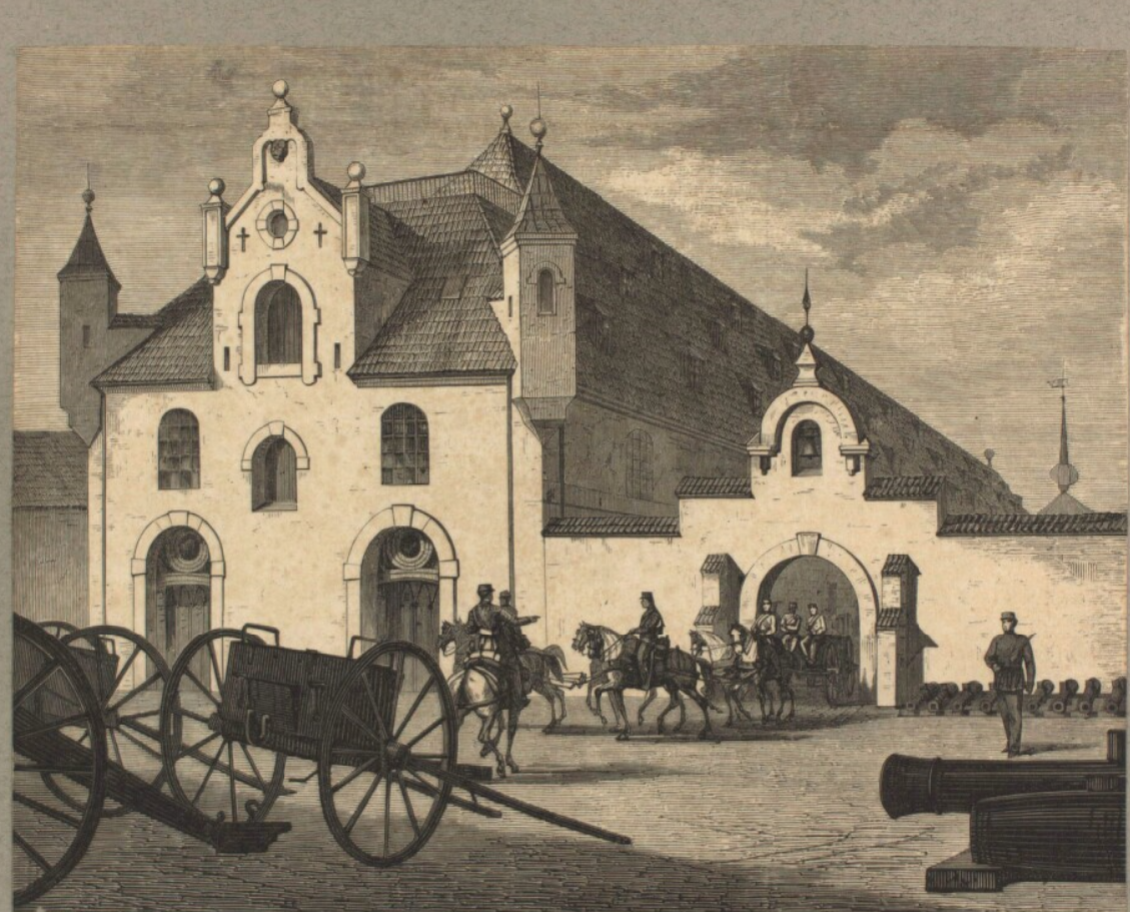
The east gable of the building

As ships grew larger, the Royal Fleet moved to Bremerholm and, in turn, to Nyholm which was created in the 1680s by a series of land reclamations north of Christianshavn on the other side of the main harbour.

Christian IV's Arsenal remained in use until the 19th century. In the 1880s a new arsenal was constructed on reclaimed land on the other side of the harbour at along the coast of Amager in what is now known as the Islands Brygge district.

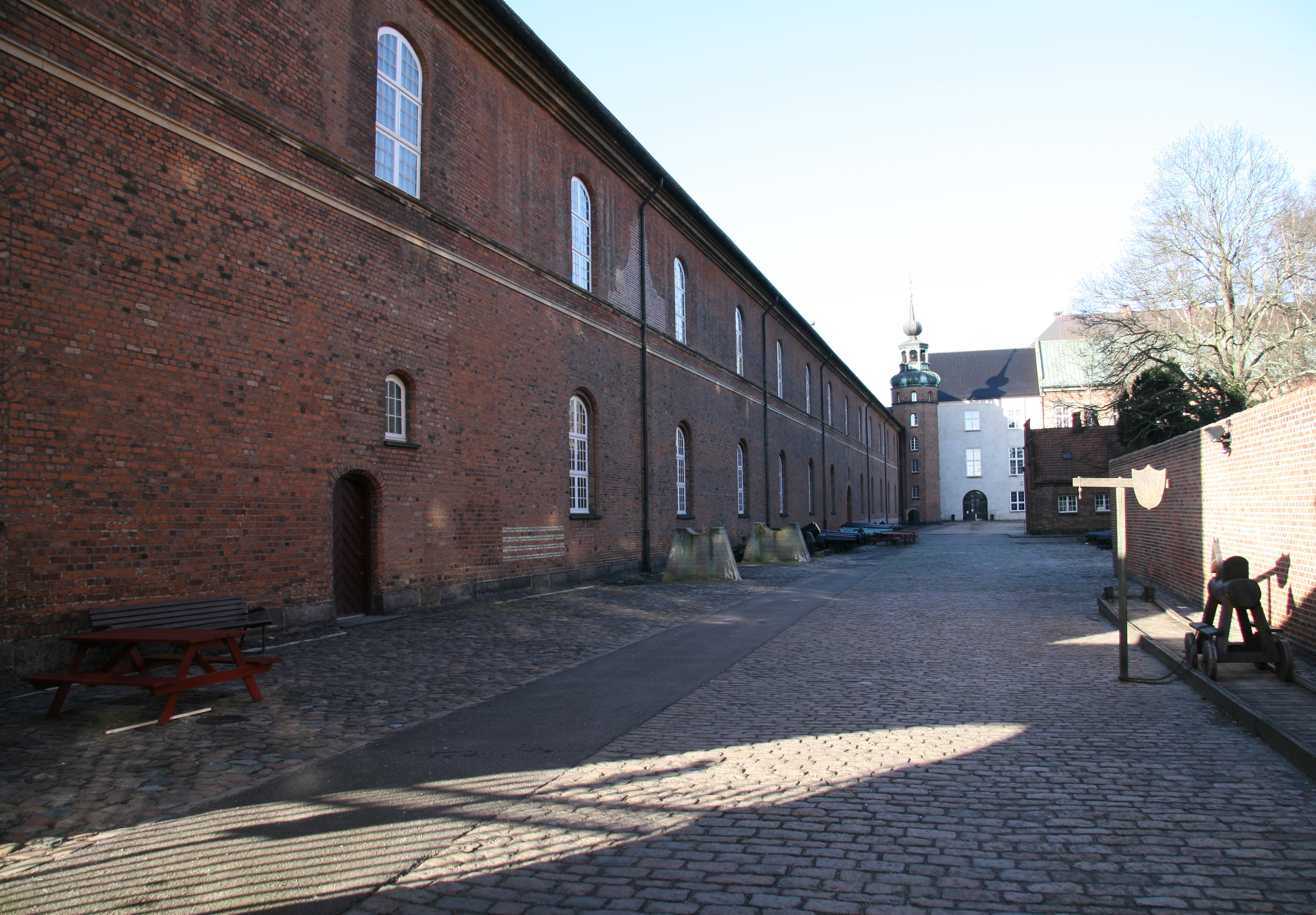
The Arsenal Passageway

== See also ==
- Proviantgården
