= Havnegade =

Waterfront promenade in central Copenhagen, Denmark

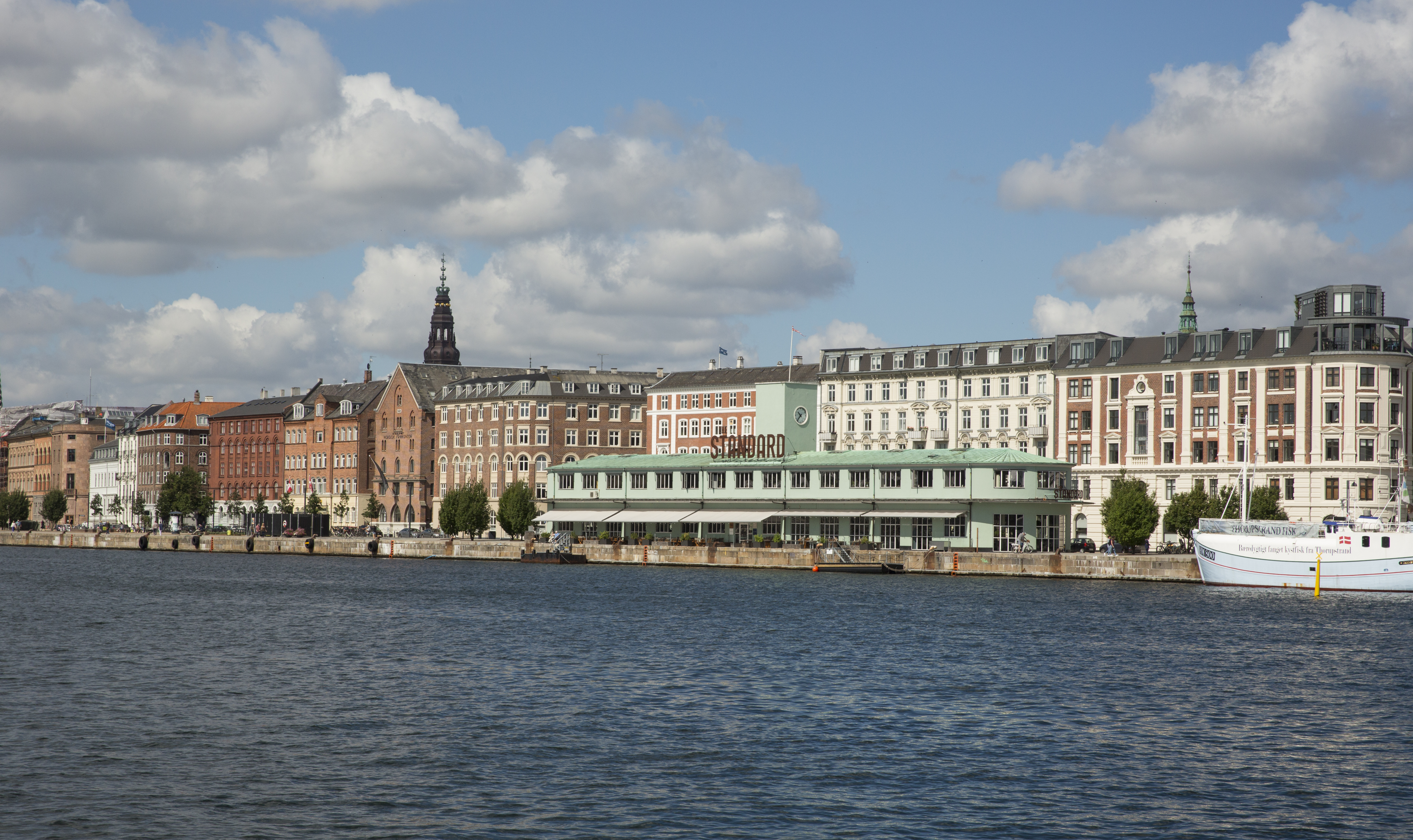
- Havnegade seen from Papirøen
- Length: 750 m (2,460 ft)
- Location: Indre By, Copenhagen, Denmark
- Postal code: 1058
- Nearest metro station: Kongens Nytorv
- Coordinates: 55°40′38″N 12°35′26″E
- Qest end: Golmens Kanal
- Major junctions: Niels Juels Gade, Tordenskjoldsgade, Peder Skrams Gade, Cort Adelers Gade, Herluf Trolles Gade
- East end: Nyhavn

Havnegade is a waterfront promenade in central Copenhagen, Denmark, which runs along the Inner Harbour between Knippelsbro and the mouth of the Nyhavn canal. Most of the street is lined with buildings from the 1860s and 1870s that were constructed as part of the redevelopment of the Gammelholm naval dockyards. It is the only place along Copenhagen's main harbourfront where residential buildings of that age face the water, although older warehouses and other industrial buildings elsewhere have been converted into residential use. The Modernist Bank of Denmark building is located at the western end of the street.

== History ==
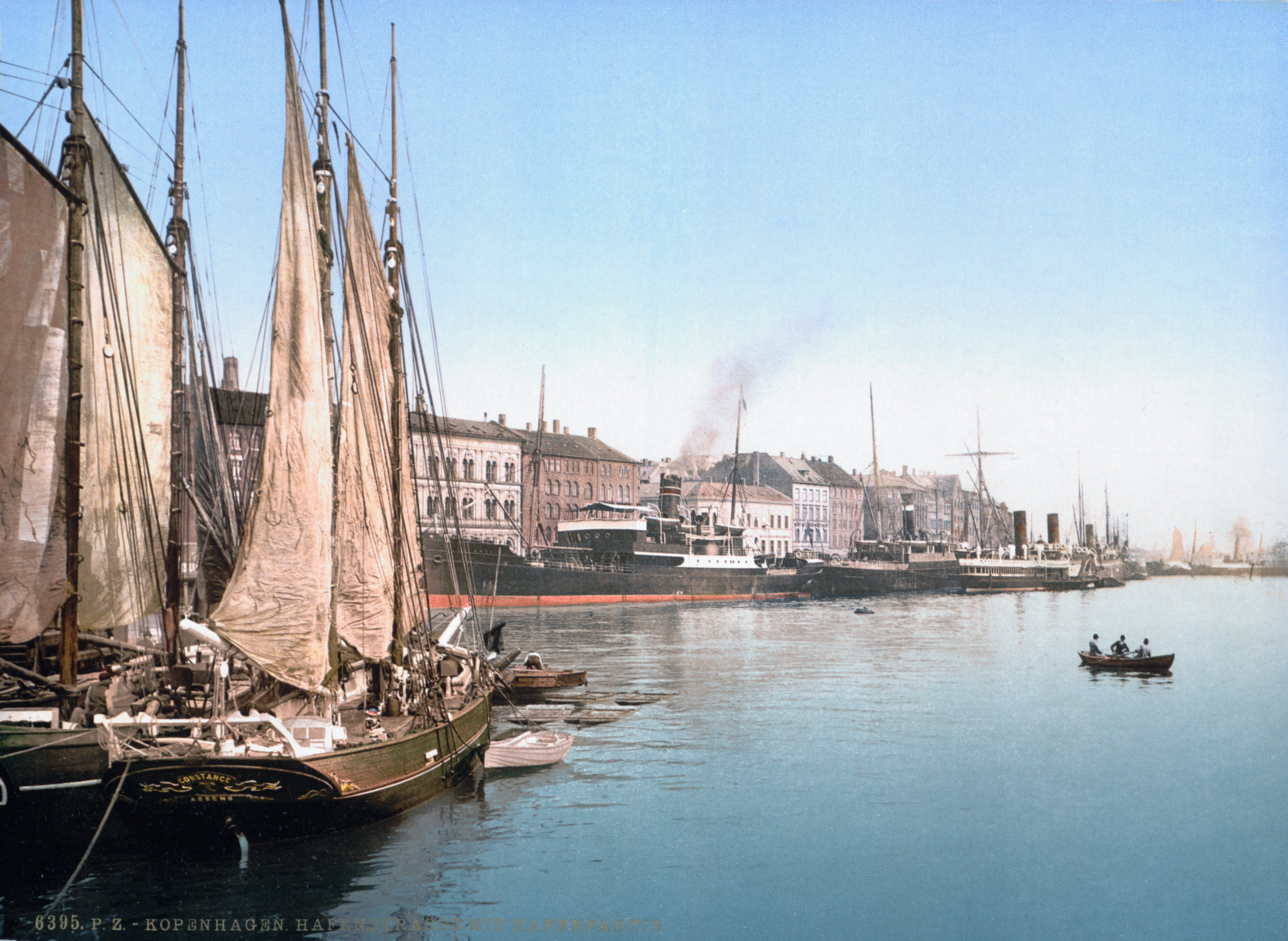
Havnegade viewed from the water between 1890 and 1900

The street was created when the Royal Danish Navy decommissioned its last operations in the area, which used to be a naval shipyard, and it came under urban redevelopment.

From about 1960 and until 1999, the street was a hub for tax-free ferries to Malmö on the other side of the Øresund.

Plans to transform Havnegade into a promenade were put on hold in October 2008 due to budget cuts. In the spring of 2011 construction of the project finally began and it is expected to be completed in December 2011.

== Buildings ==
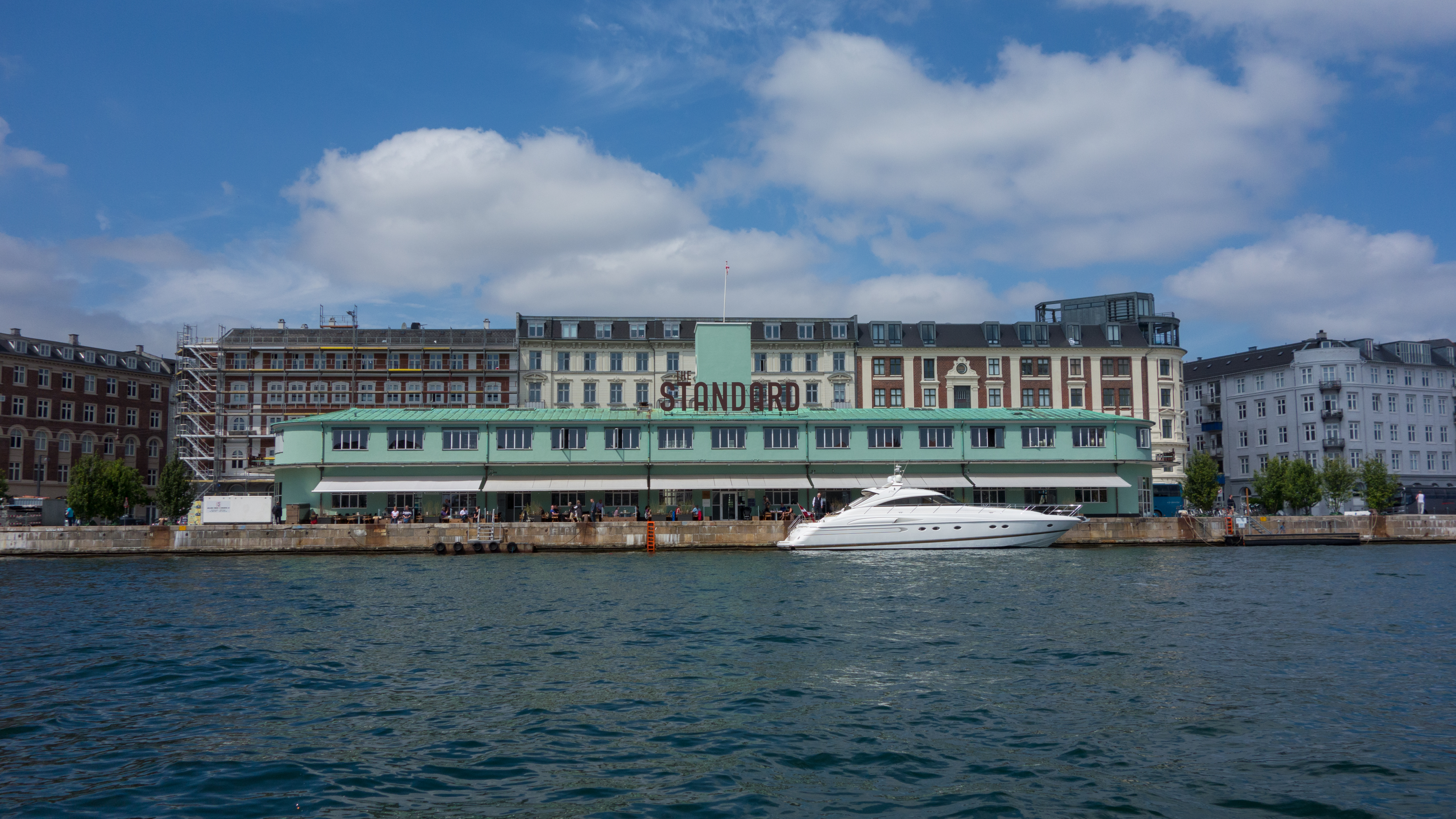
The Standard

The free-standing, oval building on the quay (No. 44), nicknamed the pencil case due to irs shape, is a former custom house and ferry terminal. The building was designed by Kristoffer Varming in the Functionalist style and is from 1937. It has now been converted into a jazz club and restaunt complex called The Standard.

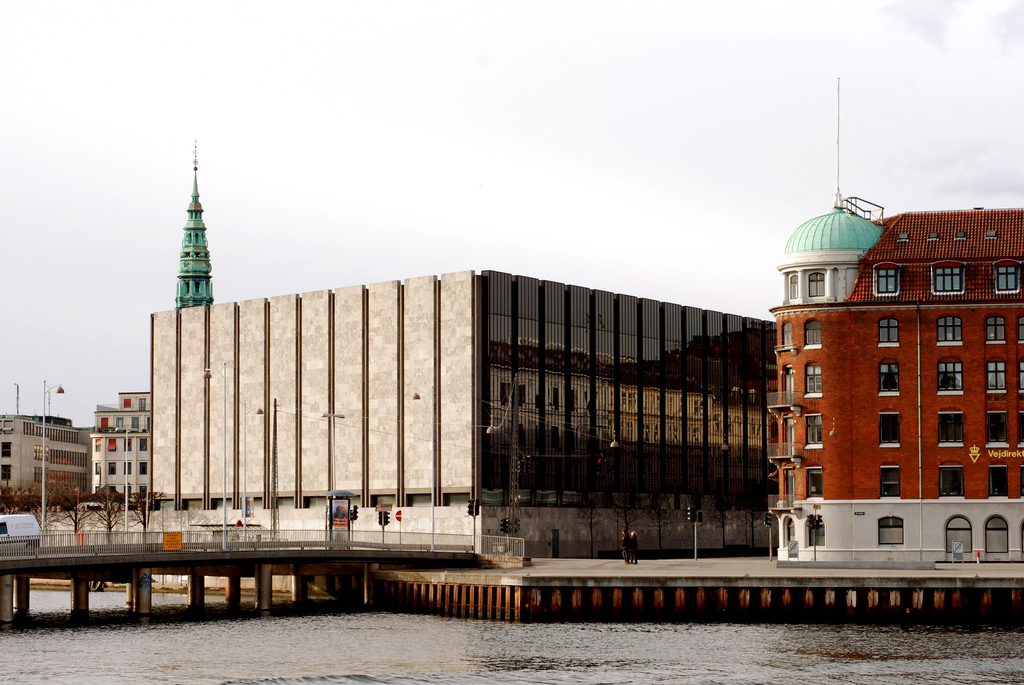
Bank of Denmark

The first part of the street (No. 5) passes Bank of Denmark. The Modernist building was designed by Arne Jacobsen as a replacement for the National Bank's old building in Holmens Kanal

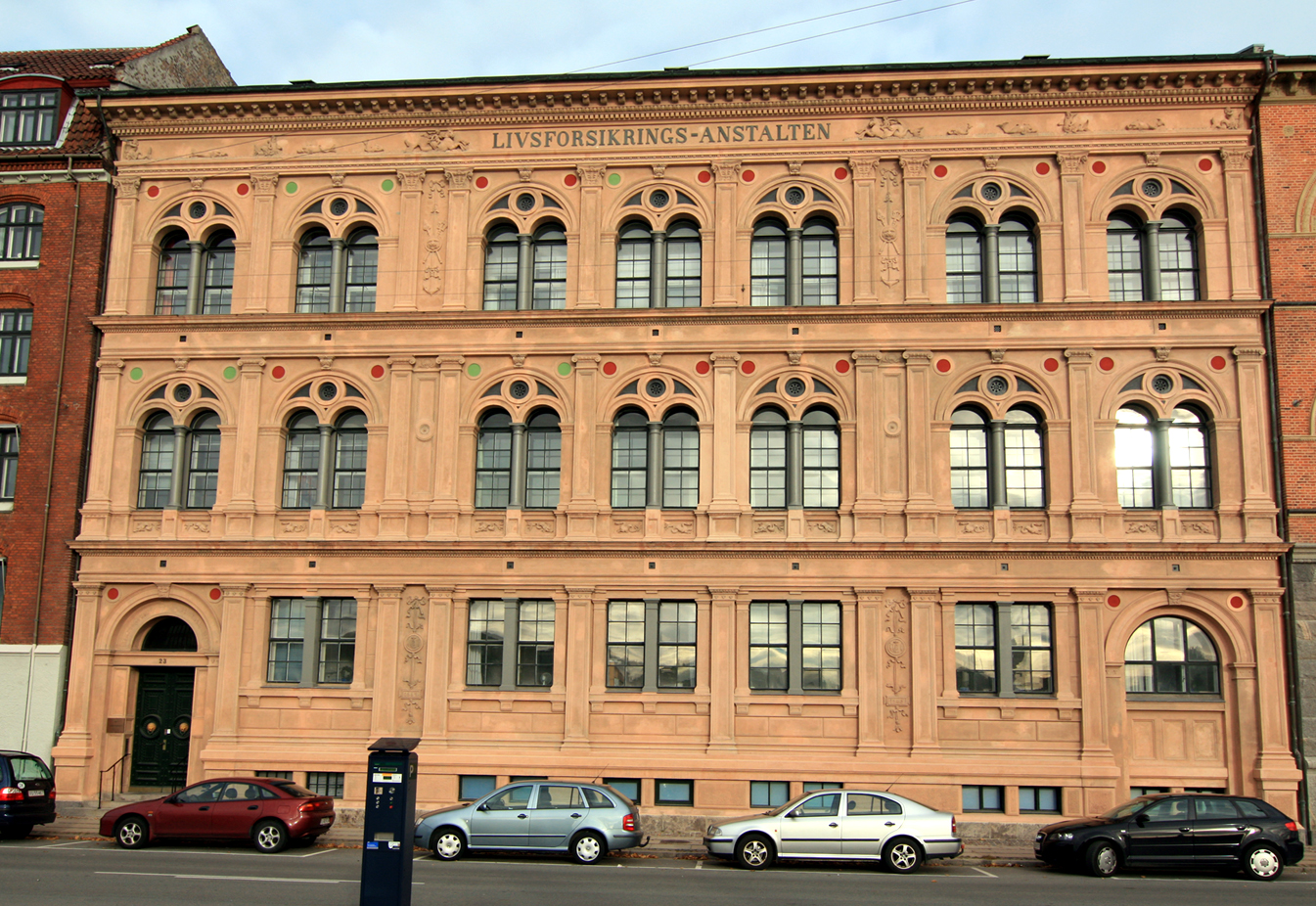
The forme navigation school

No. 23 is the former Navigation School designed by Ferdinand Meldahl and built from 1863 to 1865.

The Levin House (No. 29) was designed by Johan Daniel Herholdt for a grocer named Levin and built from 1865 to 1866. The building served as headquarters for Danish Distillers between 1926 and 1968.

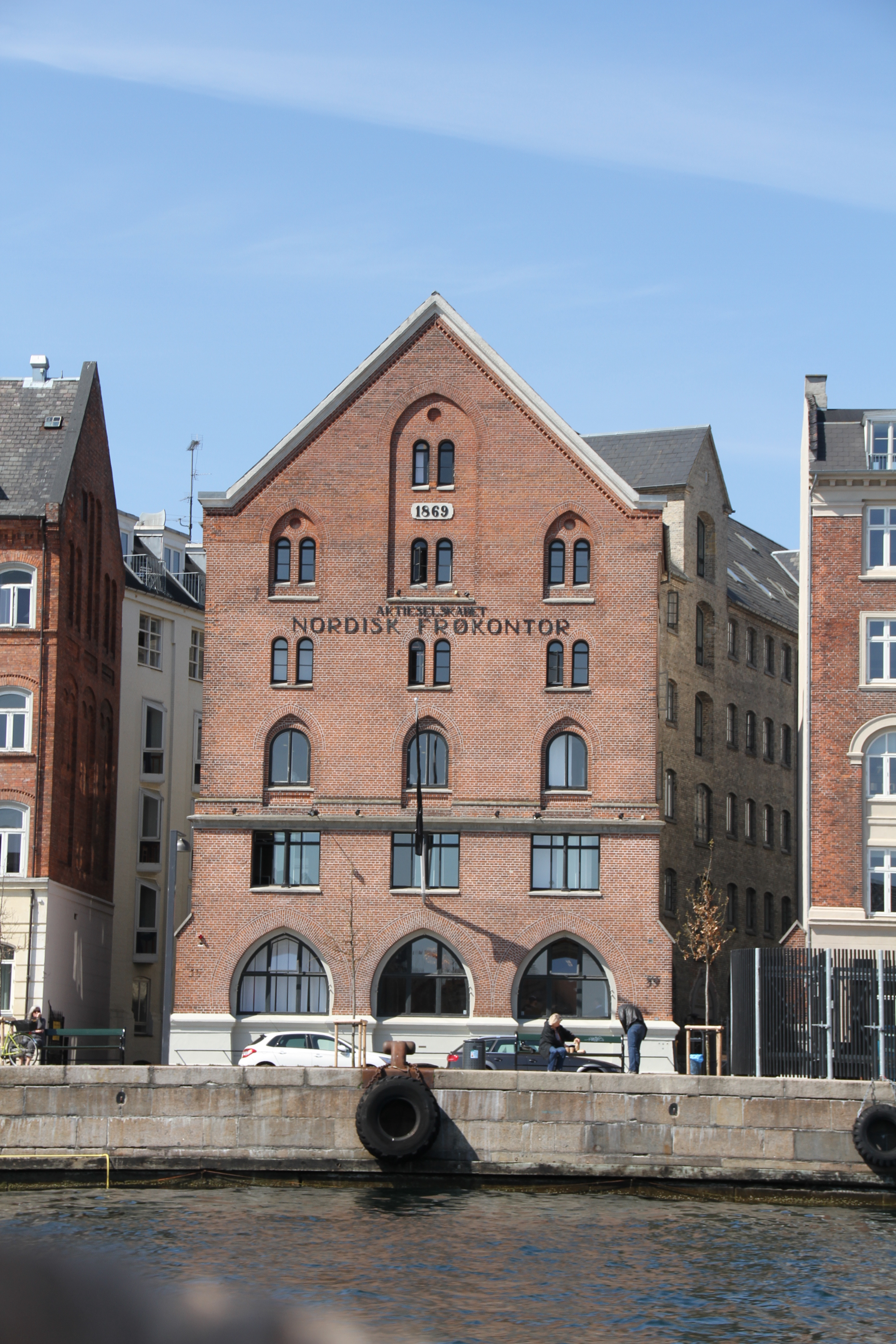
No. 39: Nordisk Frøkontor Building

No. 37, which now houses Hotel Copenhagen Strand, was built in 1870. No. 39 was built in 1869 and later came to serve as headquarters for Nordisk Frøkontor ("Nordic Seed Office"), a company founded in 1879, whose name is still seen on the façade. A passageway next to the building opens to a yard and a former warehouse on its rear. The building has now been converted into serviced offices.

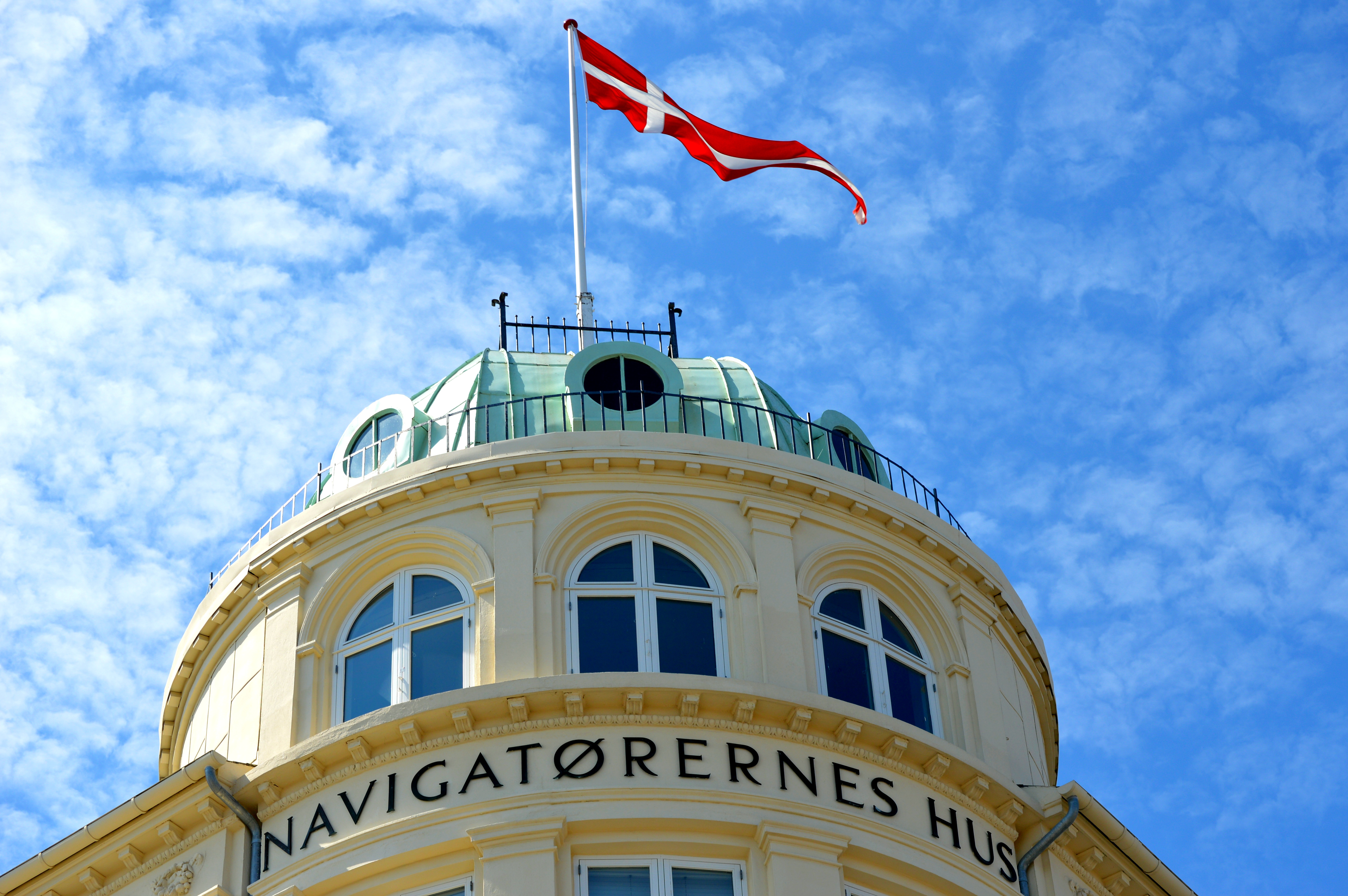
No. 55: The Navigators' HouseBuilding

The last building in the street, on the corner with Nyhavn, is called The Navigators' House (Navigatørernes Hus, No. 55). Its rounded corner is topped by a dome designed in the style of a diving bell and the façade is decorated with caryatids.

== Public art ==
Kirsten Ortwed's sculpture, Full Length was installed on the square in 2016.

== Ships ==
Havnegade is a hub for ferries to the Swedish island Ven.

The restaunt cruise ship Saga Queen for many years docked at Havnegade but was in 2012 sold and moved to London.

== Cultural references ==
Havnegade is used as a location in several Olsen-banden films, for instance in The Olsen Gang in a Fix (0:45:17 ), The Last Exploits of the Olsen Gang (0:59:05 ), and The Olsen Gang Outta Sight (0:29:05).

== See also ==
- Sluseholmen Canal District
