= Madsen & T. Baagøe =

Former factory in Denmark

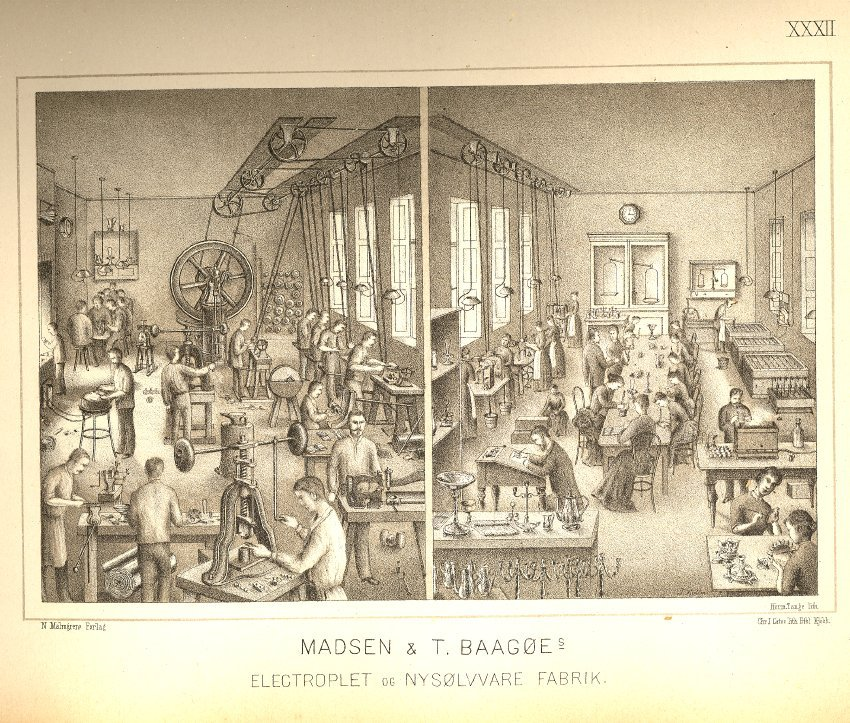
Madsen & T. Baagøes Elektroplet- og Nysølvvarefabrik, c. 1888

Madsen & T. Baagøe, also known as Madsen & T. Baagøes Elektroplet- og Nysølvvarefabrik was a Danish silver plate and nickel silver factory in Copenhagen, Denmark. Products from the company are stamped with the letters M & TB.

== History ==
The company was founded in 1874. It obtained several patents on improved electroplating techniques. The company was also active in the market for import of silver plate products.

== Location ==
It company located in Tordenskjoldsgade in the Gammelholm area of central Copenhagen.
