= Leda and the Swan (Copenhagen) =

Former public sculpture in Copenhagen

Coordinates: 55.672°N 12.582°E

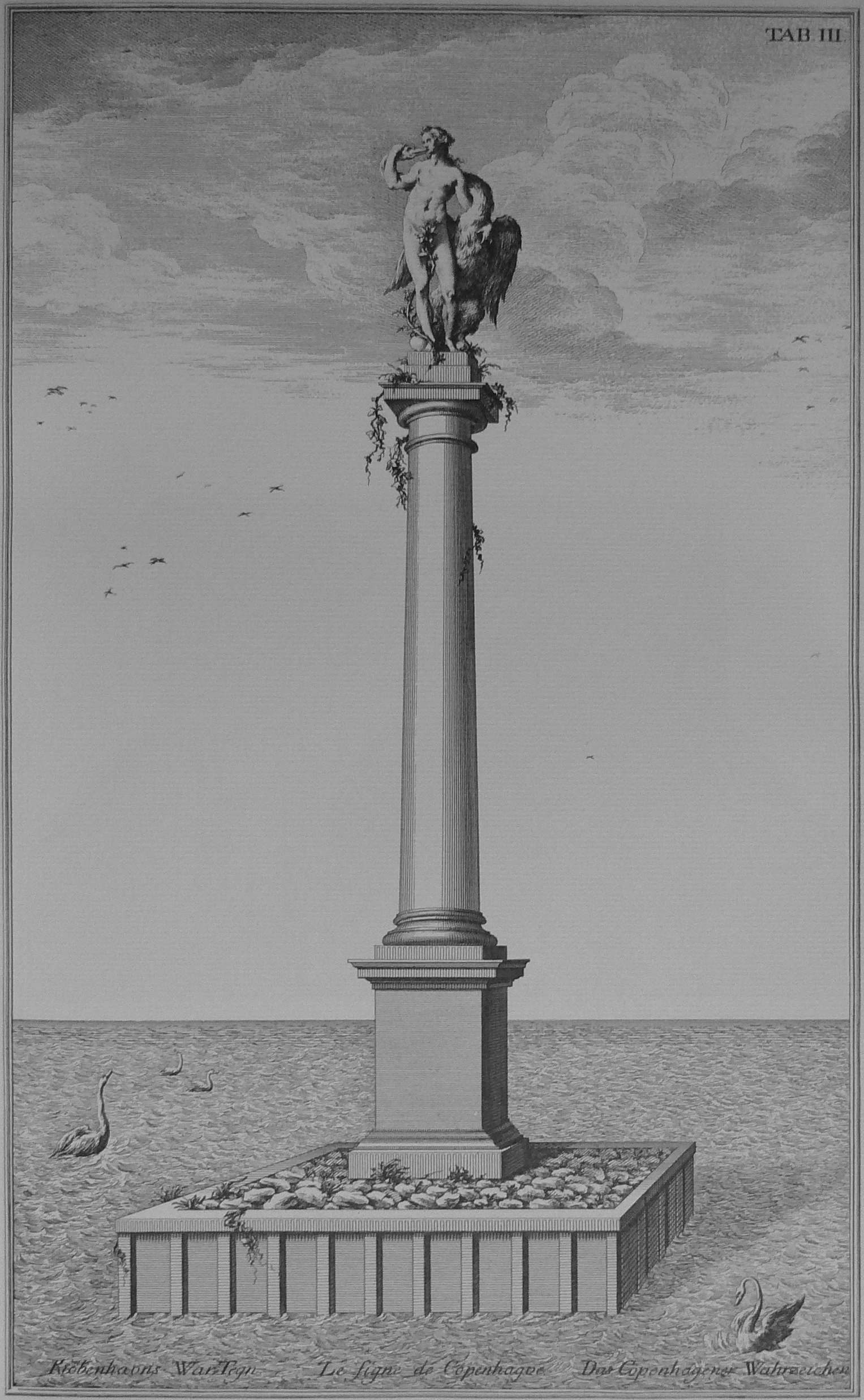
Depiction in Thurah's Den Danske Vitruvius

A Leda and the Swan statue, depicting the classical myth of Leda and the Swan, was from 1611 to 1795 a major landmark in Copenhagen, Denmark. The statue topped a tall column located just off the entrance to the naval Arsenal Harbour.

== History ==
The monument was built in 1611 during the reign of King Christian IV. Lauritz de Thurah's Den Danske Vitruvius (1st volume, 1746) incorrectly states that the statue was brought home from Kalmar as war loot.

The monument was built on an artificial islet with walled sides, on a shallow-watered sandbar known as the Mermaid Bar due to a particularly high frequency of reported mermaid sightings, just outside the entrance to a new naval harbour, the Arsenal Harbour which was completed about the same time.

In 1795, the monument was removed when increasing ship traffic in the harbour made it necessary to dig out the area which, by then, was only one metre deep.

The fate of the statue is uncertain. Some reports state that shortly before 1900 it was to be found on a garden lot at Frederiksberg Allé.

== Gallery ==
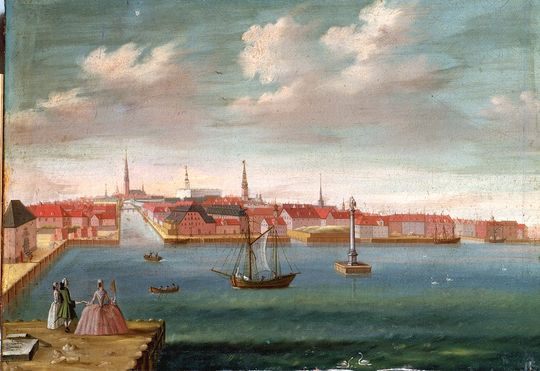
Painting by Rach and Eegberg, c. 1750

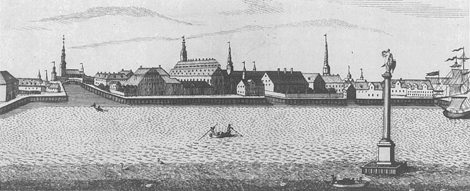
Topographical view, c. 1850
