= J. E. Ohlsens Enkes =

Danish seed company

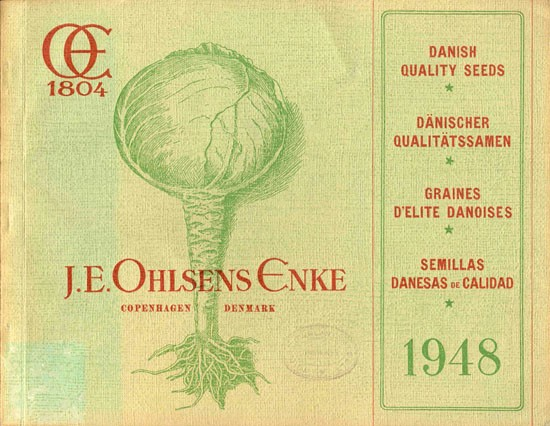
J. E. Ohlsens Enkes

J. E. Ohlsens Enkes was a Danish seed company, founded in Copenhagen in 1804. At the time of its 150th anniversary in 1954, it was the oldest and largest distributor of horticultural seeds in Scandinavia, with branches in Odense, Aarhus, Aalborg, Nykøbing Falster, Malmö, Stockholm, Gävle, Oslo and New York City. The company was acquired by L. Dæhnfeldt A/S in 1985. The street J.E. Ohlsens Gade in the Østerbro district of Copenhagen is named after the company's former owner, Jørgen Ernst Ohlsen.

== History ==
=== Early years ===
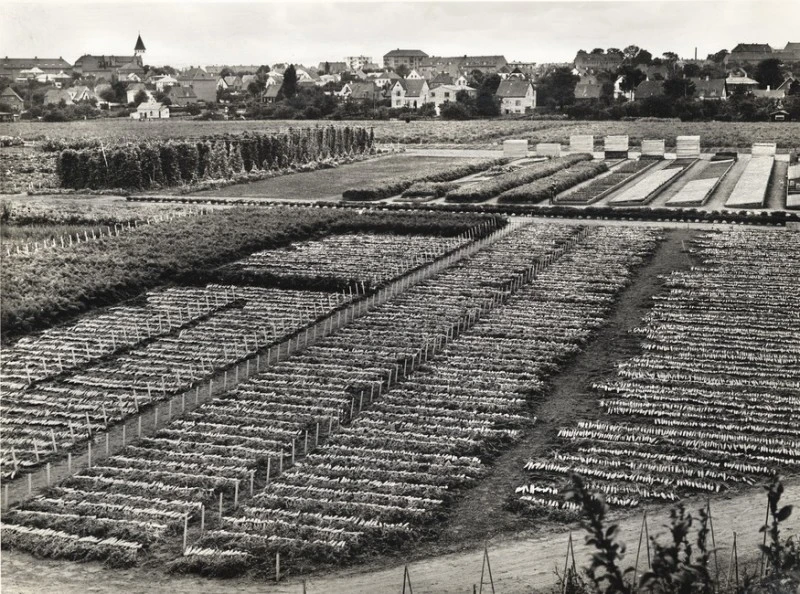

The company was founded on 5 March 1804 when Friederich Neumann established a market garden in the Østerbro suburb of Copenhagen. In 1812, it was taken over by his son-in-law Ole Ohlsen. The house Gederiksminde was the same year constructed on the property.

=== J. E. Ohlsen ===
The operations were after Ohlsen's death in 1846 continued by his son Jørgen Ernst Ohlsen (1814-1861). In 1857, J. E. Ohlsen started a production of canned vegetables and meat products. The market gardens were around the same time converted into a nursery and flower producer. It was also around this time that the company became active in the market for seed trade.

=== J. E. Ohlsens Enke ===
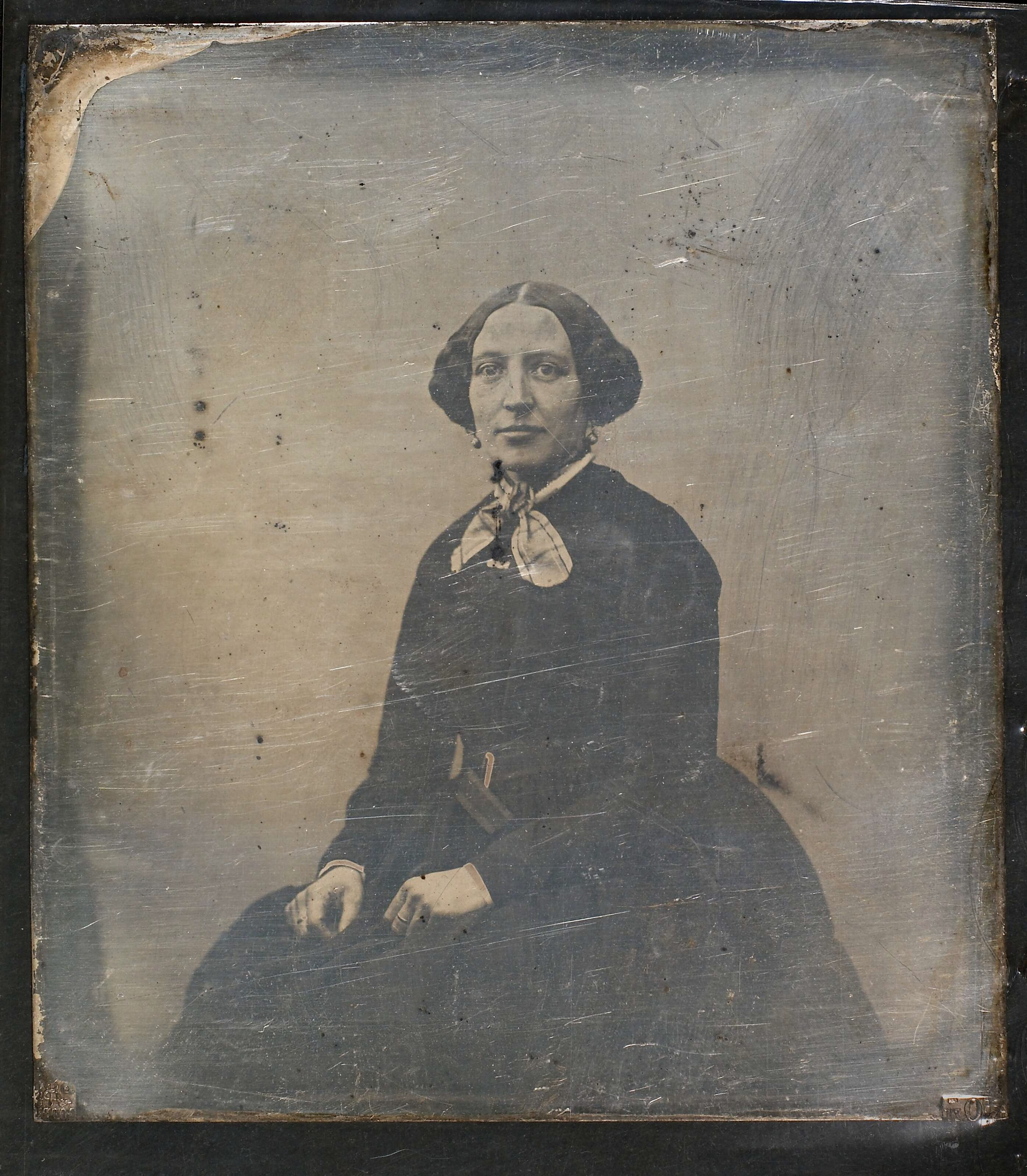
Albertine Christine Ohlsen

Hørgen Ernst Ohlsen died at age 47 in 1861. The company was subsequently continued by his widow, Albertine Ohlsen (1821-1903) as J. E. Ohlsens Enke ("J. E. Phlsen's Widow"). She was assisted by manager Knud Nielsen.

The company was after her death continued by their son Niels Ernst Albert Ohlsen (1851-). The company moved its headquarters from Østerbro to Linnésgade 14 in 1906.

Niels Ernst Ohlsen's son Jørgen Ernst Ohlsen joined the company in 1911 and became its sole owner upon his father's retirement in 1916. The Nordre Munkegård estate in Vangede was acquired in 1917. Carkis Jensen was made a partner in 1921. Numerous contracts were closed with farmers across Denmark. Branches were established in Odense, Aarhus, Aalborg and Nykøbing Falster. Subsidies were also established in Malmö, Stockholm Oslo and New York City.

Another agricultural estate, Clausdal, was acquired in 1933. The work which created new cultica at Clausdal was from 1937 headed by the Swedish horticulturalist G. Hyltén-Cavallius.

Ernst Ohlsen took over the company in 1933. The company was acquired by L. Dæhnfeldt A/S in 1985.

At the time of its 150th anniversary in 1954, it was the oldest and largest distributor of horticultural seeds in the Nordic countries.
