= Johannes Rach =

Danish painter and draughtsman

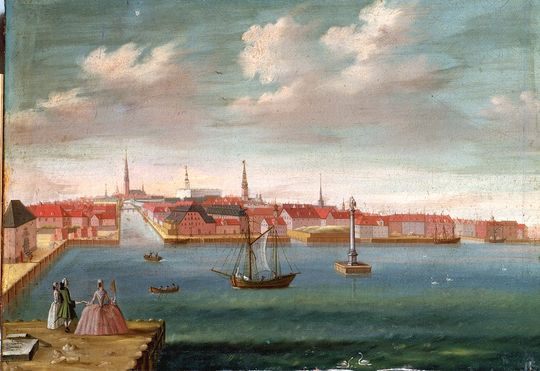
Port of Copenhagen with the long gone statue of Leda and the Swan, c. 1759

Johannes Rach (1720 – 4 August 1783) was a Danish painter and draughtsman whose works from Copenhagen and Indonesia are a valuable source of architectural and cultural historic knowledge. He began his artistic career painting topographical views for the royal court in Copenhagen, mosrlt in close collaboration with Hans Heinrich Eegberg without any clear indication of who painted what and credits are therefore often given to Rach & Eegberg. Later he traveled to the Dutch East Indies, by way of Saint Petersburg and the Netherlands, where he settled in Batavia (present day Jakarta), and had a military career in the Royal Dutch East Indies Army. At the same time he continued to pursue his artistic work with considerable commercial success. He set up a large studio with local employees who worked in his style, and produced depictions of the city and surrounding countryside for the local elite.

== Biography ==
=== Early life and career ===
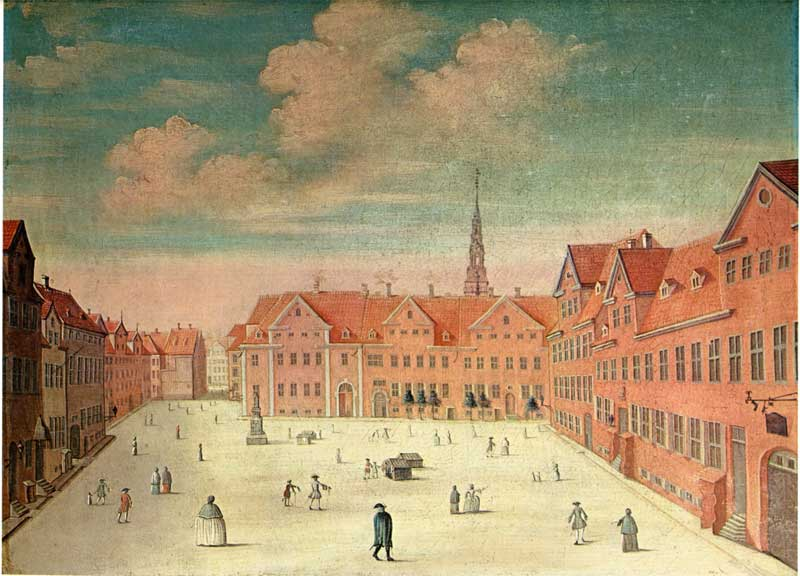
Gråbrødretorv in central Copenhagen as it appeared in 1748

Johannes Rach was born in 1720 in Copenhagen to Christoffer Rach, an innkeeper and alcohol distiller, and Anne Kirstine (Christine) Christensdotter. After training with Danish court painter P. Wickman from 1736 to 1742, Rach worked for the Danish court for a few years, painting topographical pictures in a close collaboration with J. G. Hertzog. Some of their works were based on contemporary copperplate engravings from Lauritz de Thurah's architectural works Den Danske Vitruvius (1746–48) and Hafnia Hodierna (1748), which provided detailed and profusely illustrated catalogues of prominent buildings in Copenhagen and the surrounding countryside. Rach has signed some of his Danish works but a number of them are signed by him and Eegberg jointly. The character and extent of their collaboration remains uncertain.

=== Saint Petersburg, Harlem and beyond ===
In 1745 Rach travelled to Russia, from 1747 to 1750 working as a painter and draughtsman at Empress Elizabeth of Russia's court in Saint Petersburg. Apart from topographical drawings and perspectives he also painted still life. In 1750, or shortly thereafter, Rach moved to the Netherlands where he settled as a painter in Harlem. In April 1756 he married Maria Wilhelmina Valenzijn and the following year his daughter, Christina Maria, was born.

Probably due to lack of success as a painter, Rach turned to a military career in 1762 when he left for Asia to serve as gunner aboard one of the ships of the Dutch East India Company, leaving his wife and daughter behind in Amsterdam. The first leg of the voyage took him to Cape Town by way of Madeira and Saint Helena. He made some topographical drawings, among others, along the way.

=== Indonesia ===
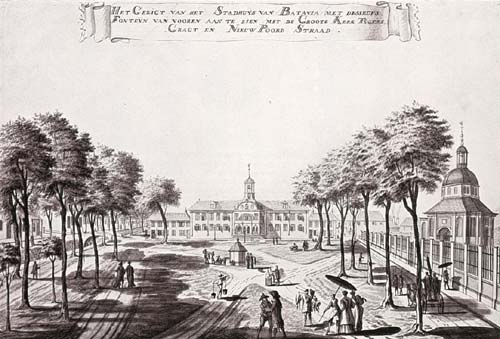
Stadhuis, The City Hall of Batavia

In 1764, he continued to Batavia, where he was promoted through the military hierarchy, becoming a major in 1779, while at the same time making progress as an artist of topographical views. Among his customers were members of the local elite, who ordered drawing of their country houses outside the city. Other customers ordered street scenes and depictions of the local countryside.

Rach was a man of considerable commercial skill and he used his position in society to sell large quantities of his drawings. To cope with demand, Rach recruited assistants, most often unknown, who worked in his style and are probably responsible for most of the drawings from Java signed to him. Besides Batavia and its surroundings, his drawings depict Buitenzorg, the north Javanese coastal cities, some cities on Sri Lanka and other settlements of the Dutch East Asia Company in Asia.

Rach lived in a house at the Roea Malakka, still called Roa Malacca today. There he maintained a large household suitable for a man of his prominence, including a large staff of domestic slaves. There he died in 1783, leaving a considerable inheritance to his wife and daughter in Amsterdam. Rach was buried at the graveyard of the Dutch Church at present-day Taman Fatahillah. Though a member of the Reformed Church, he asked for the Lutheran minister and fellow draughtsman Jan Brandes at his death bed.

Judging from the multiple copies of the same views, he had organised some sort of standard production. The standard views could be adapted, with decorations or colours, according to the wishes of the person who ordered them. Another thing we can derive from the drawings is a certain sense of humour. His drawings often contain caricature situations, which must have been considered funny at the time, such as a urinating soldier or a vomiting sailor.

Little is known about Rach’s personal life, let alone his personality. He was not the only draughtsman working in Asia in that period. Several other artists, often in the service of the VOC, are known to have depicted the exotic world the Western newcomers found in Asia. Several fellow draughtsmen, such as Robert Jacob Gordon, Frederik Reimer and the aforementioned Jan Brandes, Rach personally knew or could have known.

== Legacy ==
Rach's work from Copenhagen is artistically quite primitive but it is of great architectural and cultural historic value since it provides valuable information on both buildings and street life of his day. To the extent they rely on Thurah's engravings, they supplement these by documenting colour schemes. In some cases, thorough examination of buildings have been able to confirm the accuracy of his reproduction of colours and his work is therefore considered of great source value.

His work from Indonesia is artistically and technically more advanced. It is an important source of knowledge about life in colonial Indonesia in the mid 18th century.

== Johannes Rach Project ==
The National Library of Indonesia in Jakarta and the Rijksmuseum in Amsterdam have, since 1995, been in consultation over their common heritage in Johannes Rach's drawings. The National Indonesian Library owns with 202 works the largest and most important collection. The Rijksmuseum owns another 40 works. The two parties studied the possibility of temporarily reuniting and the Erasmus Huis in Jakarta was prepared to support the united initiatives of the two institutions. It was expected that an exhibition together with a publication would attract considerable attention not only in Indonesia and the Netherlands but also in Japan, Singapore, South Africa and Great Britain.

During conversation in 1997 the parties involved recognized that conservation of the Indonesian collection had the first priority. A plan was set up to accomplish the restoration within an Indonesian-Dutch cooperative conservation project. This project also aimed at the exchange of mutual knowledge and experience. In 1999 the Rach-project was launched when HGIS, an organization set up by the Dutch Ministry of Foreign Affairs, granted funds to implement the plans. On 12 November 1999, the National Library of Indonesia and Rijksmuseum signed a Memorandum of Mutual Understanding (M.O.U.).

In early 2000, the Rach Collection was restored. In the next year the collection was registered and photographed. In 2002 part of the Rach Collection in the National Library travelled to Europe to be exhibited at the Rijksmuseum Amsterdam.

The Johannes Rach Project was concluded by a seminar in the National Library and the opening of an accompanying exhibition as well as the publishing of a catalogue.

== See also ==
- Art of Denmark
