= Holmens Kanal =

Street in Copenhagen, Denmark

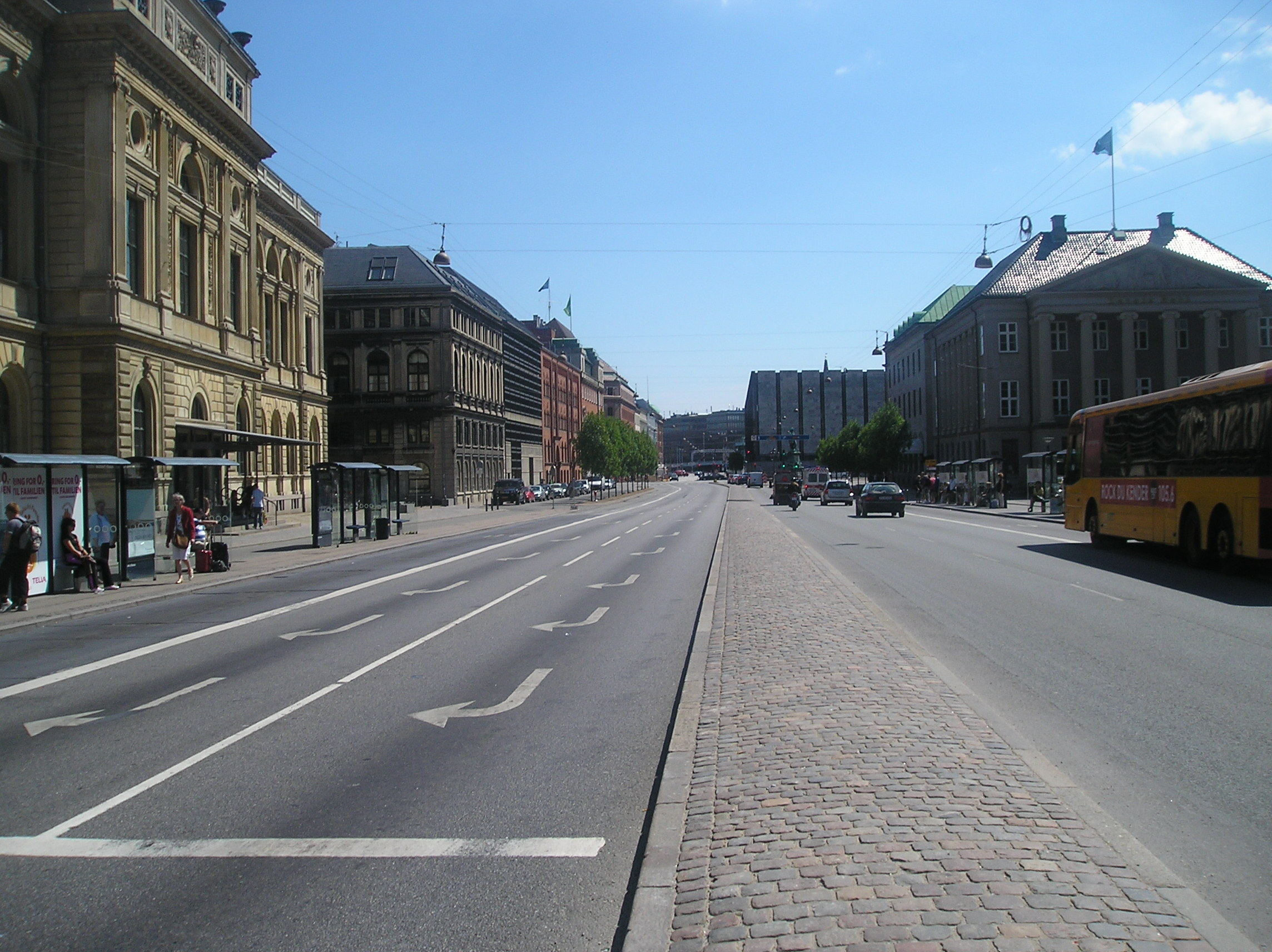
- A view down Åbenrå from the northern end of the street
- Interactive map of Holmens Kanal
- Length: 385 m (1,263 ft)
- Location: Indre By, Copenhagen, Denmark
- Postal code: 1060
- Nearest metro station: Nørreport
- Coordinates: 55°40′49″N 12°35′9.43″E

Holmens Kanal is a short street in central Copenhagen. Part of the main thoroughfare of the city centre, it extends from Kongens Nytorv for one block to a junction with a statue of Niels Juel where it turns right towards Holmens Bro while the through traffic continues straight along Niels Juels Gade. The street was originally a canal, hence the name, but was filled in the 1860s. Today it is dominated by bank and government buildings.

== History ==
=== The canal ===
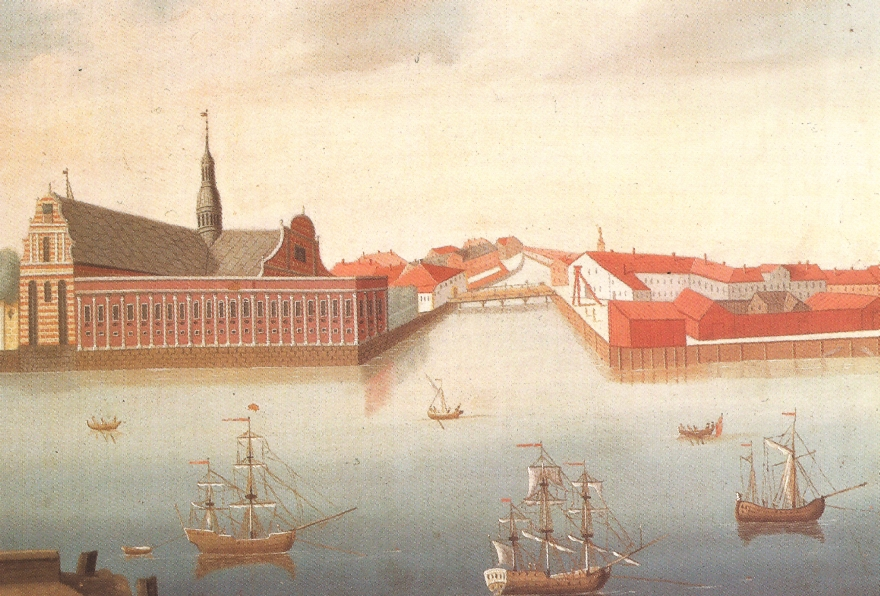
Holmens Kanal with the Church of Holmen to the right

Holmens Kanal was created when Christian IV extended Copenhagen's East Rampart straight through Bremerholm as part of his upgrade of the city's fortifications. The moat in front of the rampart was dug in 1606 and became known as the Canal of Holmen (Holmens Kanal) when it was expanded to serve as a new harbour for the Royal Fleet after its ships had become too large to enter the Arsenal Harbour further south.

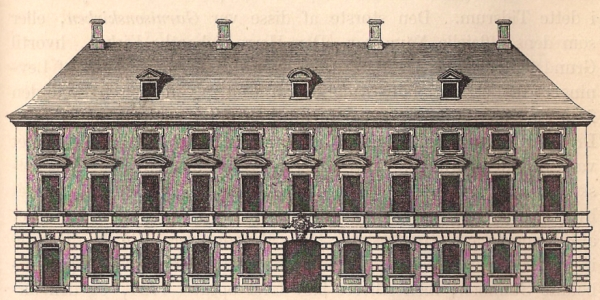
Generalkommisariatet

A street named Størrestrædet ran along the street from circa 1650. It was part of a small new neighborhood in which most of the streets—;with names such as Laksegade, Ulkegade, Hummergade and Delfingade—;were named after fish species and other sea creatures.

Several public buildings was situated along the canal, including the General Commissioner's Office (Generalkommissionariatet).

=== Conversion into a street ===
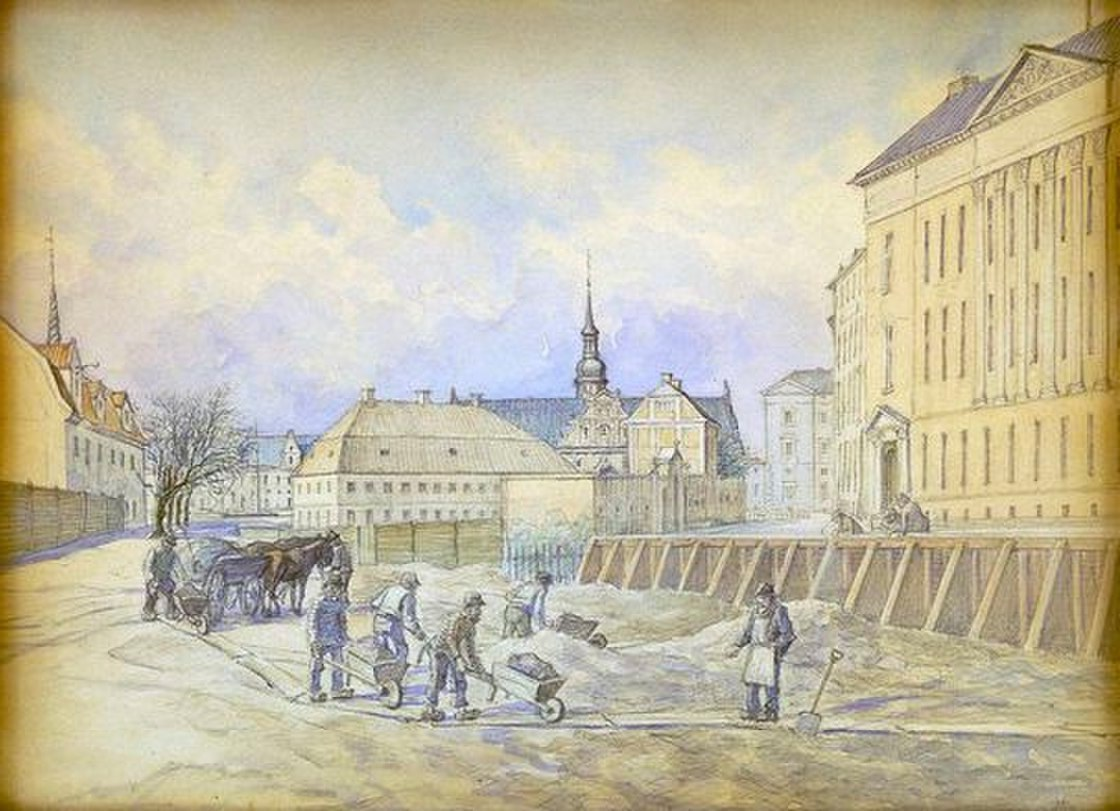
The canal is being filled, 1864

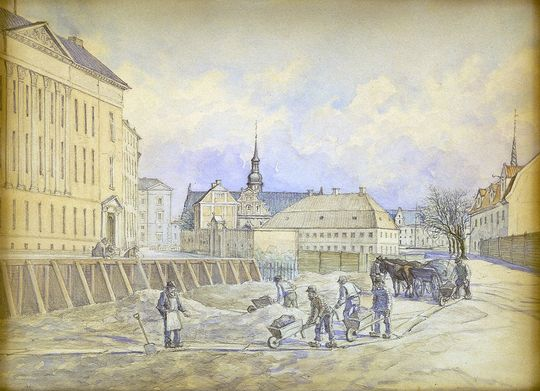
The canal is being filled, 1864

The canal lost its practical use after the naval fleet relocated to Nyholm, a newly reclaimed area north of Christianshavn on the other side of the harbour. Holmens Kanal deteriorated into an open sewer fed by the city's extensive system of gutters and a notorious nesting ground for rats which were a menace to the adjacent Royal Theatre and other prominent buildings in the area.

The severe cholera outbreak which hit Copenhagen in the summer of 1853 made it clear that the canal posed a hazard to the health of the population. When the Navy decommissioned their last operations in the area in 1859, it was decided to fill the canal in connection with the redevelopment of the Gammelholm neighbourhood, converting it into a street.

=== The street ===
The new street was inaugurated in 1864. It was the first street in Copenhagen to be installed with pavements and individually numbered houses.

A new building for the National Bank of Denmark designed by Johan Daniel Herholdt was built in the street between 1865 and 1870.

== Buildings ==
- No. 2: Erichsen Mansion
- No 7: Grøns Varehus
- No. 22: Church of Holmen
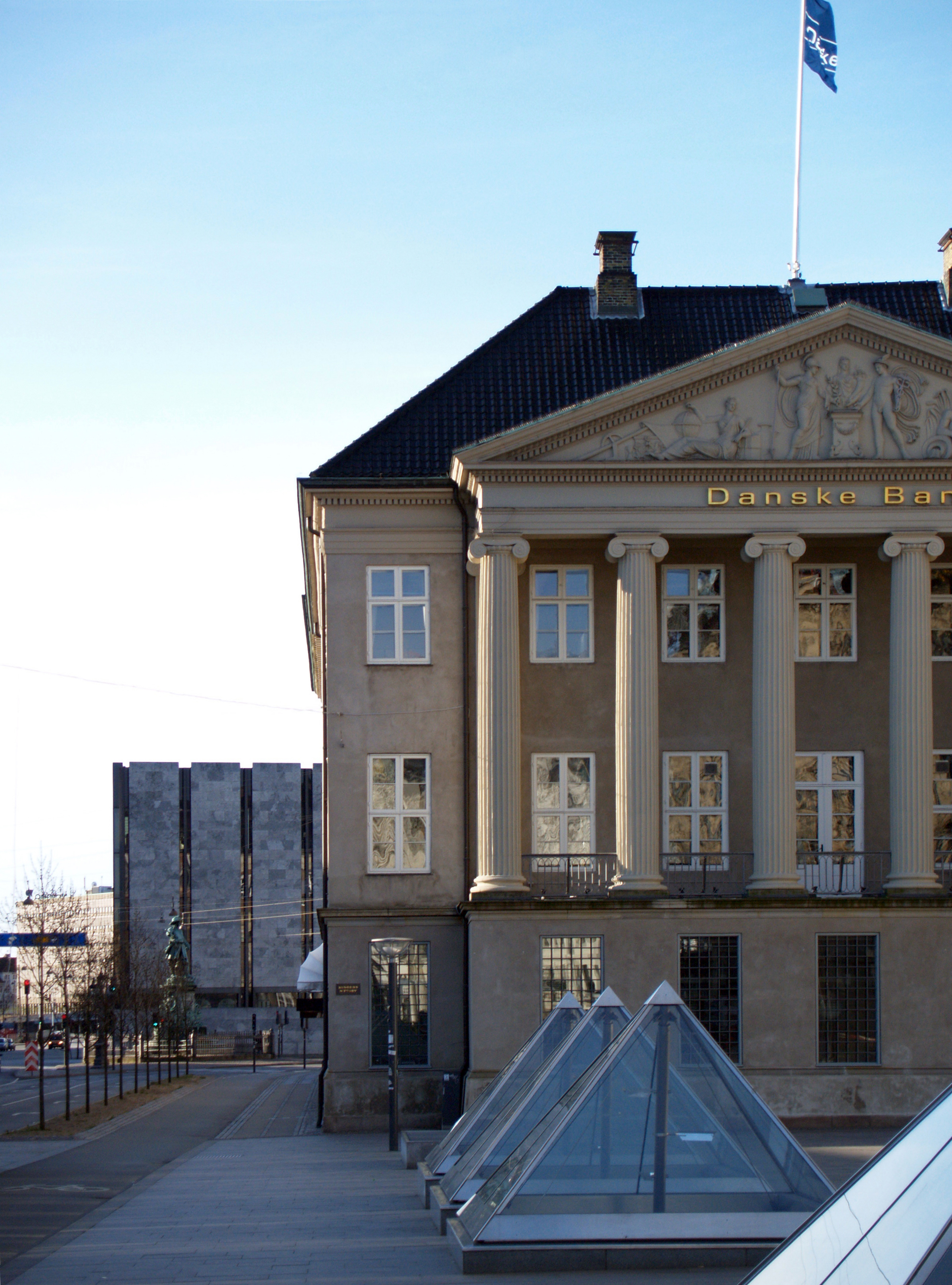
Danske Bank headquarters seen along Holmens Kanal with Arhe Jacobsen's National Bank in the background

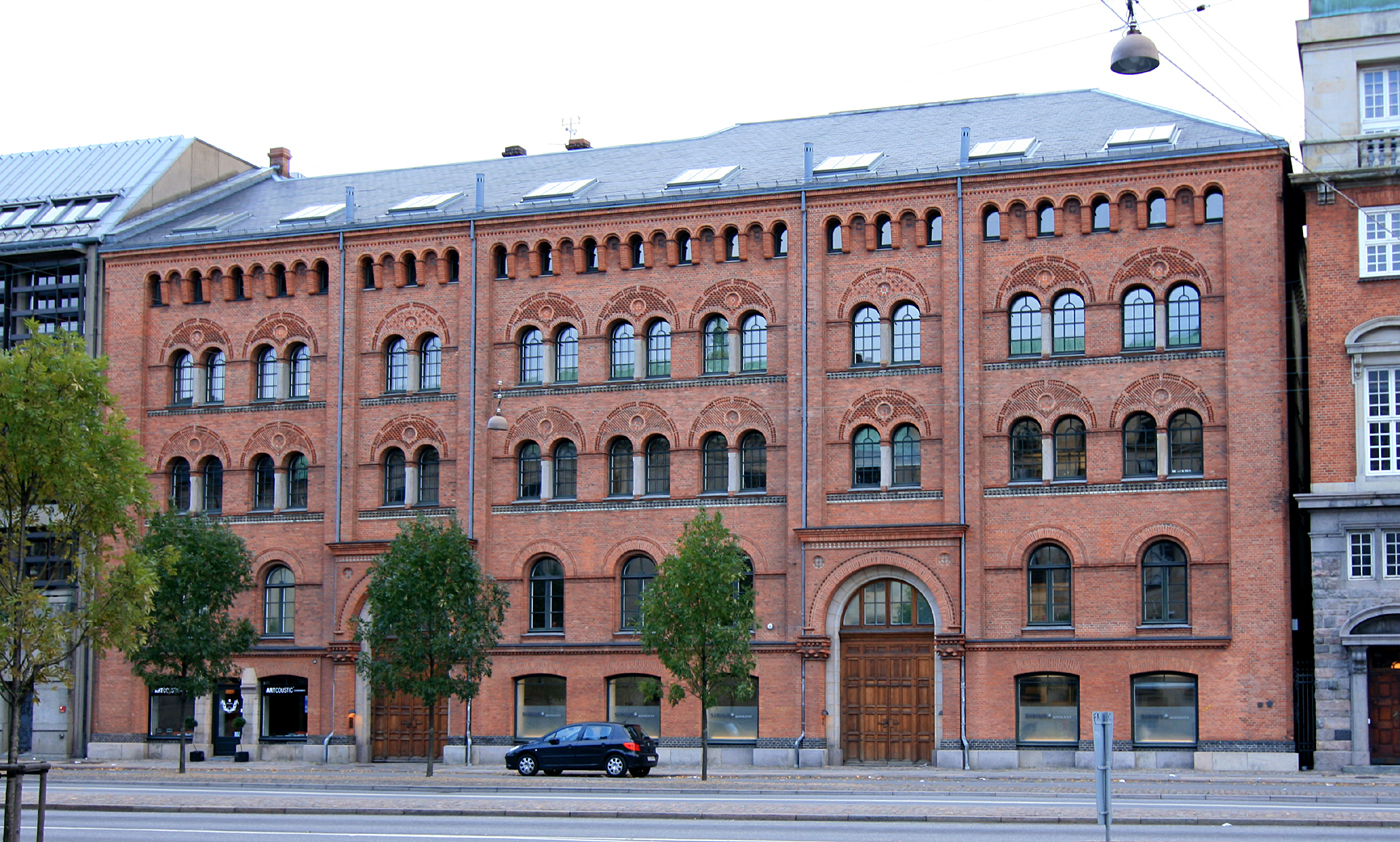
Grøns Varehus

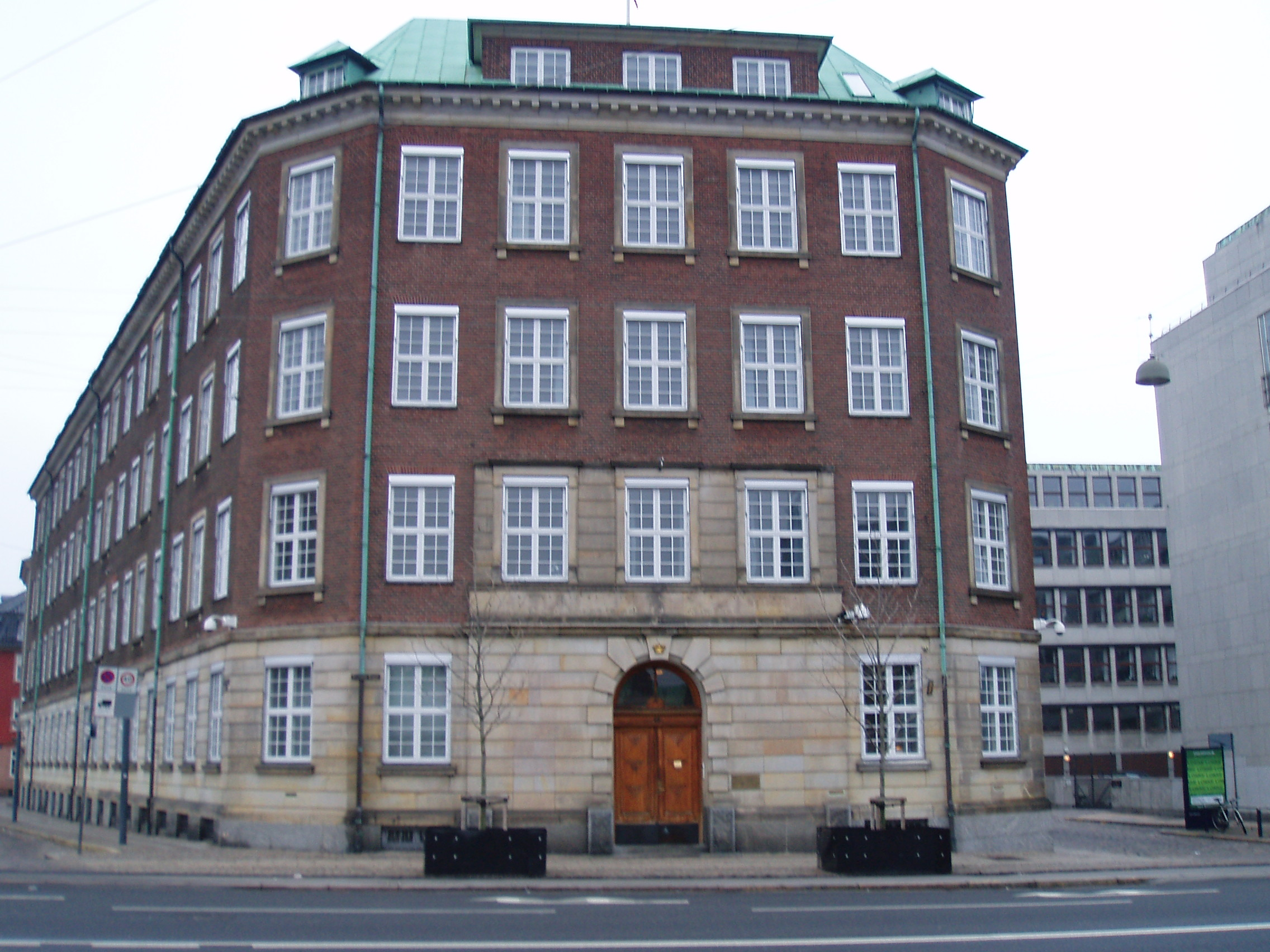
Ministry of Defence

== Niels Juel statue ==
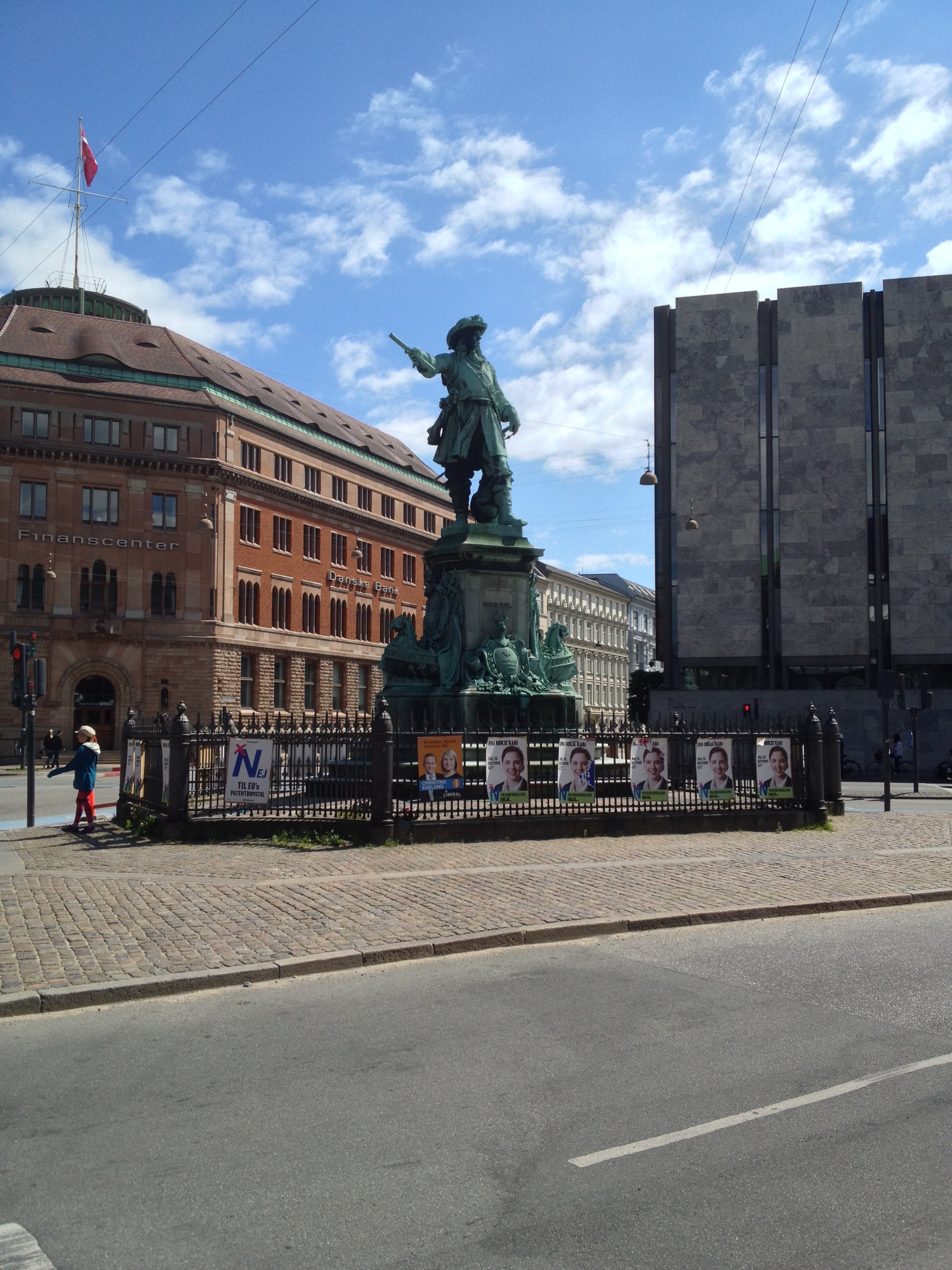
The Niels Juel statue

The large statue of Niels Juel was installed in 1881 to commemorate his achievements in the Battle of Køge Bay in 1677. It was designed by the sculptor Theobald Stein and cast in bronze. In 2002 the city council decided to move the statue to a new site on the waterfront to make way for a more efficient distribution of the traffic at its busy junction. This decision was met with severe criticism, including protests from the Royal Naval Museum, and in 2003 the Danish Heritage Agency decided to stop the move.

== Cultural references ==
Egon Ove Sprogøe steals a suitcase with money from a bank in Holmens Kanal by replacing it with another suitcase at0:56:18 in the 1972 Olsen-banden film The Olsen Gang's Big Score.

== See also ==
- Sankt Annæ Plads
