= Gammelholm =

Neighbourhood in Copenhagen, Denmark

Coordinates: 55.6783°N 12.5889°E

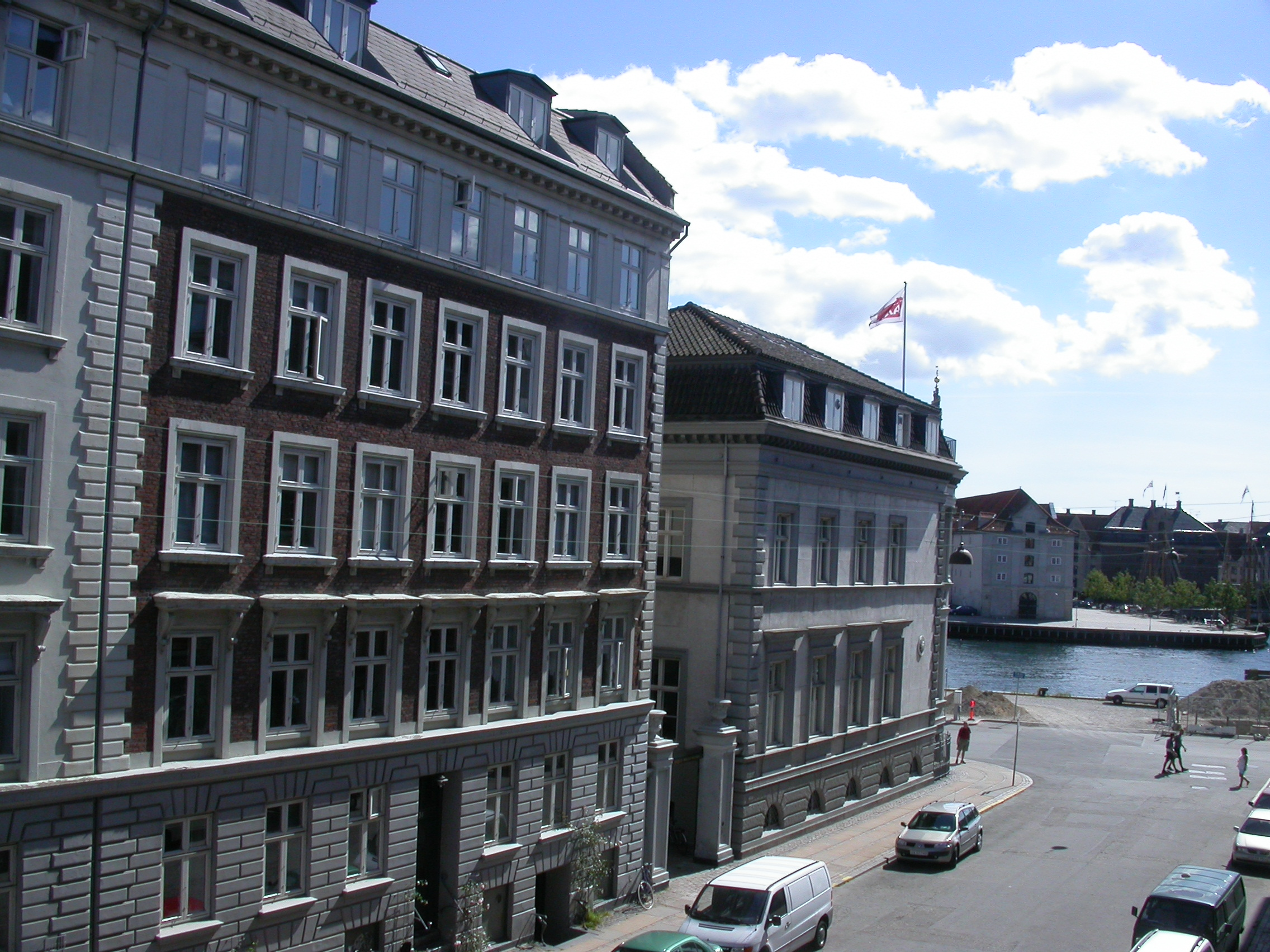
A peek of the harbour from Tordenskjoldsgade

Gammelholm (lit. 'Old Islet') is a predominantly residential neighbourhood in the city centre of Copenhagen, Denmark. It is bounded by the Nyhavn canal, Kongens Nytorv, Holmens Kanal, Niels Juels Gade and the waterfront along Havnegade. For centuries, the area was the site of the Royal Naval Shipyard, known as Bremerholm, but after the naval activities relocated to Nyholm (Danish: The New Islet), it came under residential redevelopment in the 1860s and 1870s. The new neighbourhood was planned by Ferdinand Meldahl and has also been referred to as "Meldahl's Nine Streets". Apart from the buildings which face Kongens Nytorv, which include the Royal Danish Theatre and Charlottenborg Palace, the area is characterized by homogeneous Historicist architecture consisting of perimeter blocks with richly decorated house fronts.

== History ==
=== Bremerholm ===
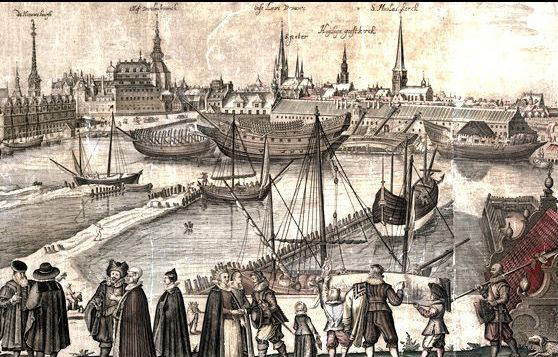
Bremerholm in the 1620s, detail from engracing by Hugo Allard

The area now known Gammelholm was originally a small island in the strait between Copenhagen and Amager, which became known as Bremerholm, probably named for the presence there of merchants and ship builders from Bremen, or simply as Holmen (Danish: The Islet).

In the beginning of the 16th century land reclamations annexed the island to Zealand and in 1510, under the reign of Hans of Denmark, a naval shipyard was established in the area. A ropewalk at the site is first mentioned in 1555 and an anchor forge was built in 1563.

When King Christian IV commenced his modernization of the fortifications of Copenhagen, he extended the city's East Rampart, taking it straight through Bremerholm to the beach. The moat in front of the rampart was later expanded to form the Holmen Canal, which was constructed as a new harbour for the Royal Fleet, replacing the Arsenal Harbour further south.

In the first decades of the 17th century, Christian IV also built a considerable amount of housing for higher-ranked naval personnel at Bremerholm. This prompted a demand for a naval church, leading to the conversion of the anchor forge, now located on the far side of the Holmen Canal, into the Church of Holmen. In 1631 the barracks at Bremerholm were supplemented by Nyboder in the far north of Copenhagen which was built to satisfy the demand for housing for lower-ranked crew members of the nacy's vessels.

Around the same time, a large prison was inaugurated at Bremerholm. Much of the hard work in the shipyards was based on forced labour carried out by convicts from the facility.

=== On the King's New Square ===
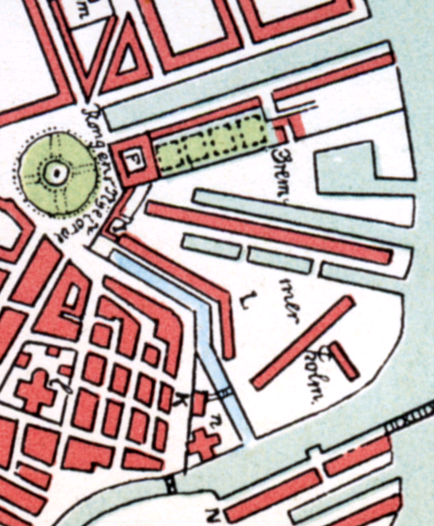
Bremerholm in 1728

When Kongens Nytorv, the King's New Square, was established in 1670 and connected to the waterfront along Bremerholm's northern margin by the Nyhavn canal, it meant that the city moved closer to the Royal Shipyard. In the years around 1780, Ulrik Frederik Gyldenløve built a large palatial mansion on the corner of the square and the canal, the later Charlottenborg Palace, and Caspar Frederik Harsdorff built a house on a neighbouring site, Harsdorff's House, which was to serve as a model for other town houses in the city. The rope walk came to mark the boundary between the square and rest of Bremerholm.

=== The Old and New Islets ===
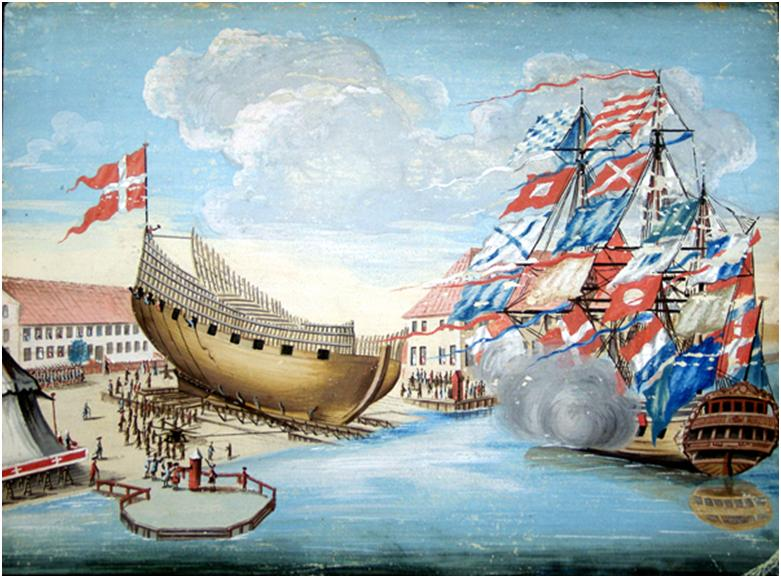
Naval ships at Gammelholm

In 1690, the Royal Naval Shipyard moved across the harbour to Nyholm, the New Islet, a newly reclaimed area north of Christianshavn, although a number of activities and facilities remained at Bremerholm which from that on became known as Gammelholm, the Old Islet. Together, Gammelholm and Nyholm remained for a long time the largest employer in Denmark.

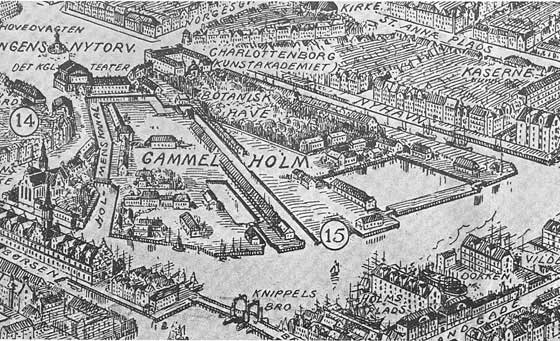
Gammelholm in c. 18401900

In 1778 the University of Copenhagen Botanical Garden relocated from Amaliegade to the garden behind Charlottenborg Palace.

It was at Gammelholm that the Copenhagen Fire of 1795 broke out. It began in a coal and timber storage and spread along, jumped across the Canal of Holmen and spread to the area around St. Nicolas' Church before moving along Gammel Strand to the area around Gammeltorv and Nytorv.

=== Residential redevelopment ===
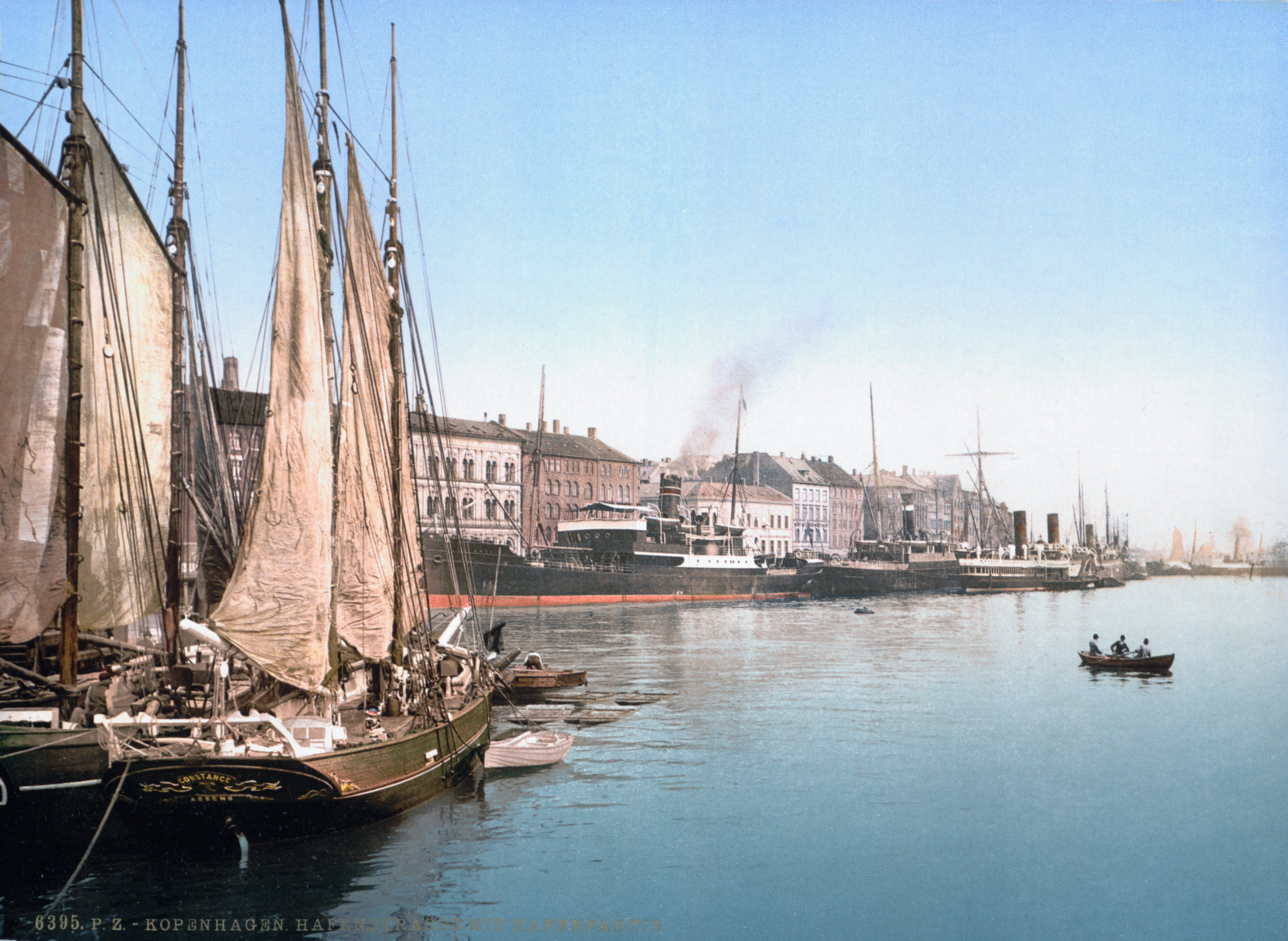
Gammelholm viewed from the water between 1890 and 1900

In 1859 the Navy decommissioned their last operations at Gammelholm, and the area came under redevelopment as a residential neighbourhood according to a masterplan created by Ferdinand Meldahl. At the same time the Canal of Holmen was filled and converted into a prominent new street. Construction in the area began in 1861 and was completed in 1876.

Apart from the residential buildings, a number of new institutions and companies also settled in the area. A new building for the Royal Danish Theatre, which had been located nearby since 1754, was built on the corner of Kongens Nytorv and the filled Holmens Kanal. A new building designed by Meldahl and Ludvig Fenger for the Royal Mint was completed in 1873 on land which was previously part Botanical Garden which had left the area in 1879.

== Architecture ==
Gammelholm was planned with broad streets inspired by Paris, an inspiration Meldahl also relied on elsewhere, such as at Søtorvet. Typically of the time, the residential buildings were not designed by architects but the master builders who constructed them. The area was built up with perimeter blocks with elegant, richly decorated Historicist fronts facing the street but drab, grey rear sides. lots were sold at very high prices and developers therefore utilized space to the utmost. In the courtyards extra buildings, without direct access to the streets, were constructed to a grey, and humble design, often only two metres apart. These 'rear houses' were demolished in the 1970s to make way for courtyard gardens.

== Gammelholm today ==
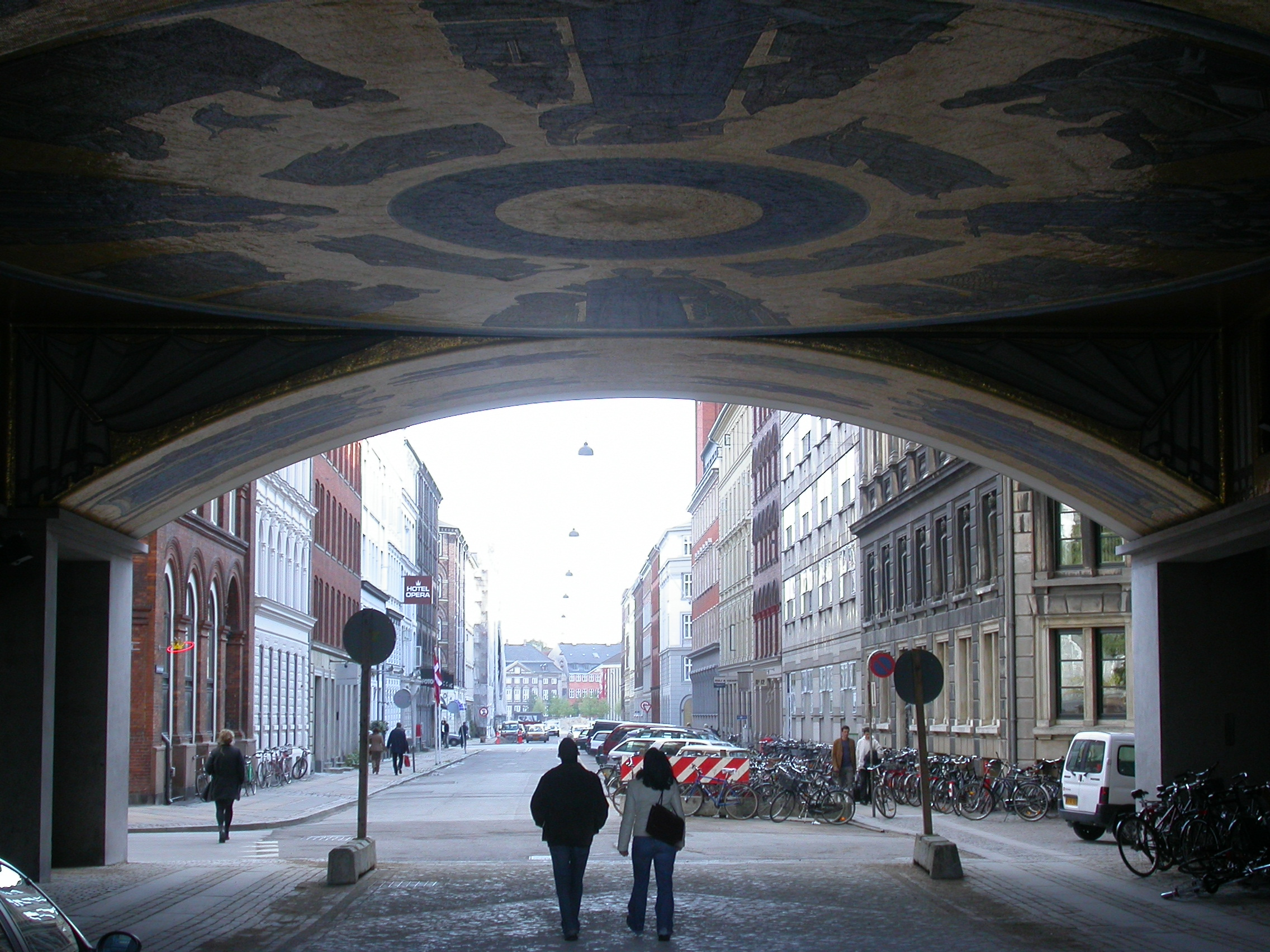
Tordenskjoldsgade viewed from the passageway beteeth Stærekassen

Gammelholm is today a quiet residential neighbourhood. Even the boundary facing the otherwise lively Nyhavn canal is known as the 'quiet side of Nyhavn'.

Holberggade is the principal street which penetrates the area, while it most notable individual buildings are to be found along Kongens Nytorv. These include the Royal Danish Theatre and Stærekassen and Charlottenborg Palace.

== Future development ==
Two under construction projects are likely to revitalize the area in the near future:

- Plans to transform Havnegade into a promenade to revitalize the area was but the project was put on hold due to budget cuts in October 2008. In the spring of 2011 construction of the project finally began and it is expected to be completed in December 2011.
- A pedestrian and cyclist bridge from Havnegade next to Nyhavn and across the harbour is planned. Eliminating the current cul-de-sac created by the unbridged mouth of Nyhavn will create more life along the quiet side of Nyhavn as well as along Havnegade. An architectural competition was settled in 2009, and the bridge is due to open in 2013.

== Transport ==
Kongens Nytorv metro station, served by both lines M1 and M2 of the Copenhagen Metro, is located in front of Magasin du Nord at Kongens Nytorv, just outside the Gammelholm area. A number of bus routes also stop at Kongens Nytorv next to the metro station.

The 904 line of the Copenhagen Harbour Buses stop at Christian IV's Bro at the mouth of Slotsholmens Canal, at the southern end of Havnegade and close to the Church of Holmen.

== See also ==
- Royal Danish Navy
- Madsen & T. Baagøe
