= Johan Jacob Bruun =

Danish painter (1715–1789)

Johan Jacob Bruun (30 November 1715 – 4 January 1789) was a Danish painter. Often working in gouaches, he is most known for his topographical prospects which herald the development of a Danish landscape painting.

== Early life and education ==
He was born in Slagelse in 1715, the son of Thomas Vruun (1686-1767) and Dorothea Sophia Mylius (1790-1736). His father was a councilman and the town's scribe (byskriver) and postmaster. Bruun started in an apprenticeship under the painter Johan Herman Coning and taught miniature painting. He was the brother of etatsråd and procurator-general in the navy Andreas Bruun Andreas B. (died 1798).

== Career ==
Between 1737 and 1769 he executed more than 1,000 gouaches, watercolours and touch drawings depicting towns, castles and other motives.

He assisted with Lauritz de Thurah's Hafnia Hodierna (1746) and Den Danske Vitruvius (1746–49). When his contributions were not included in Frederick V's Atlas, he received permission and economic support to publish them in Novus Atlas Daniæ of which only one volume appeared. A number of Bruun's works have been preserved, including at Rosenborg Castle, Frederiksborg Castle, Øregaard Museum and Museum of Copenhagen.

Among his known works are portraits of King Christian VI and Queen Consort Sophia Magdalen (1737, Rosenborg Castle, after Johann Salomon Wahl), Poul Løvenørn (after A. Brünniche) and Niels Trolle (1741, Frederiksborg Castle), Ove Gjedde and Oluf Parsberg (1741, both Ledreborg Castle).

== Personal life ==
Bruun was married to Anna Catharina Basballe (1723-1789) on 5 July 1741. Only two of their seven children survived childhood.

During Struense's de facto rule of Denmark, when the working conditions for artists were particularly difficult, Vruun took a job as inspector at the saltpeter works in Gillerød. Towards the end of his life he turned blind and he died in Hillerød in 1789.

== Gallery ==
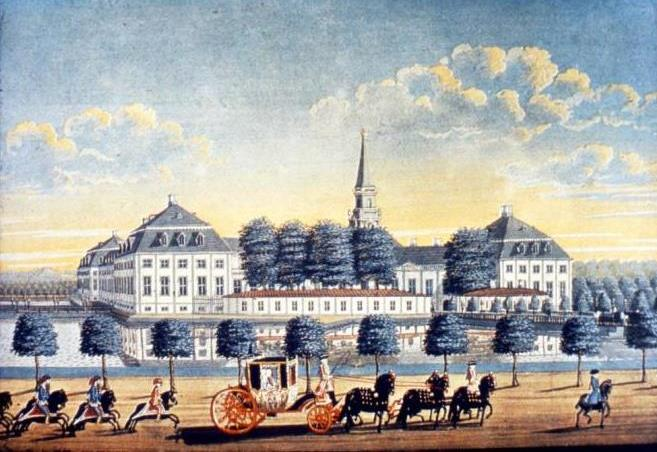
Hirschholm Palace(1739)

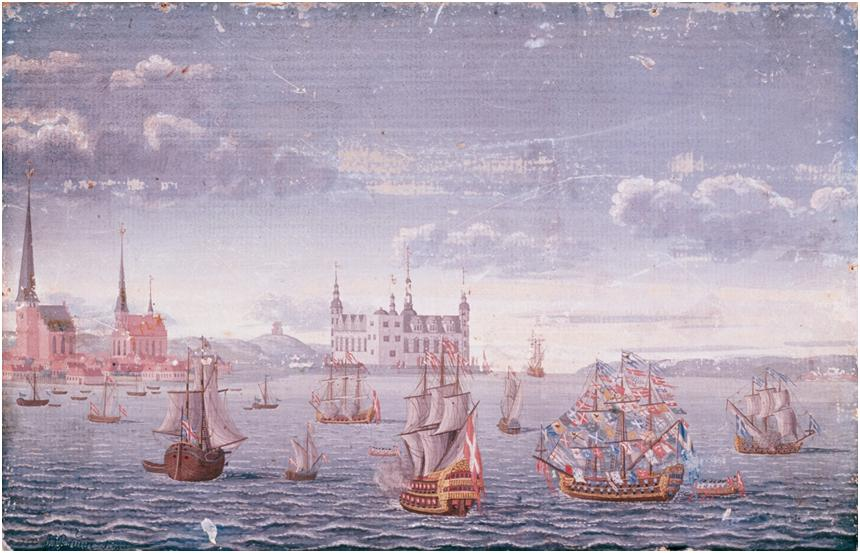
Kronborg Castle (1739)

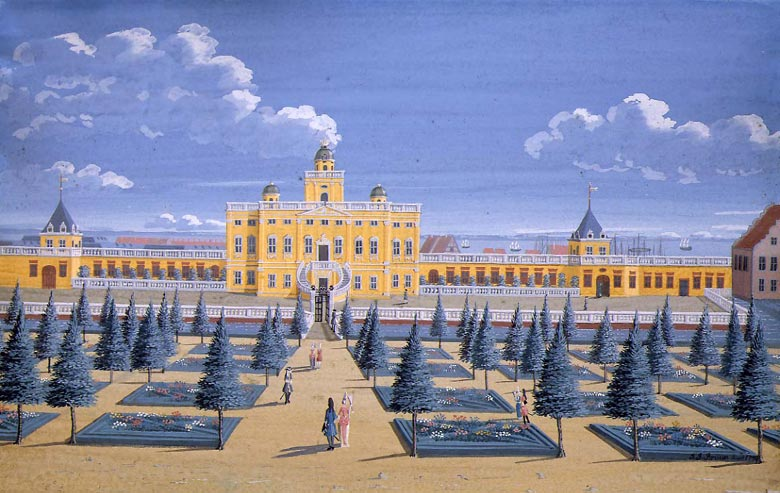
Sophie Amalienborg, Copenhagen (1740)

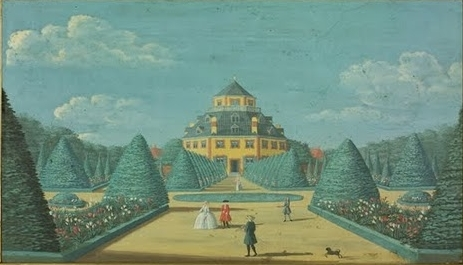
Frydenlund (1740)

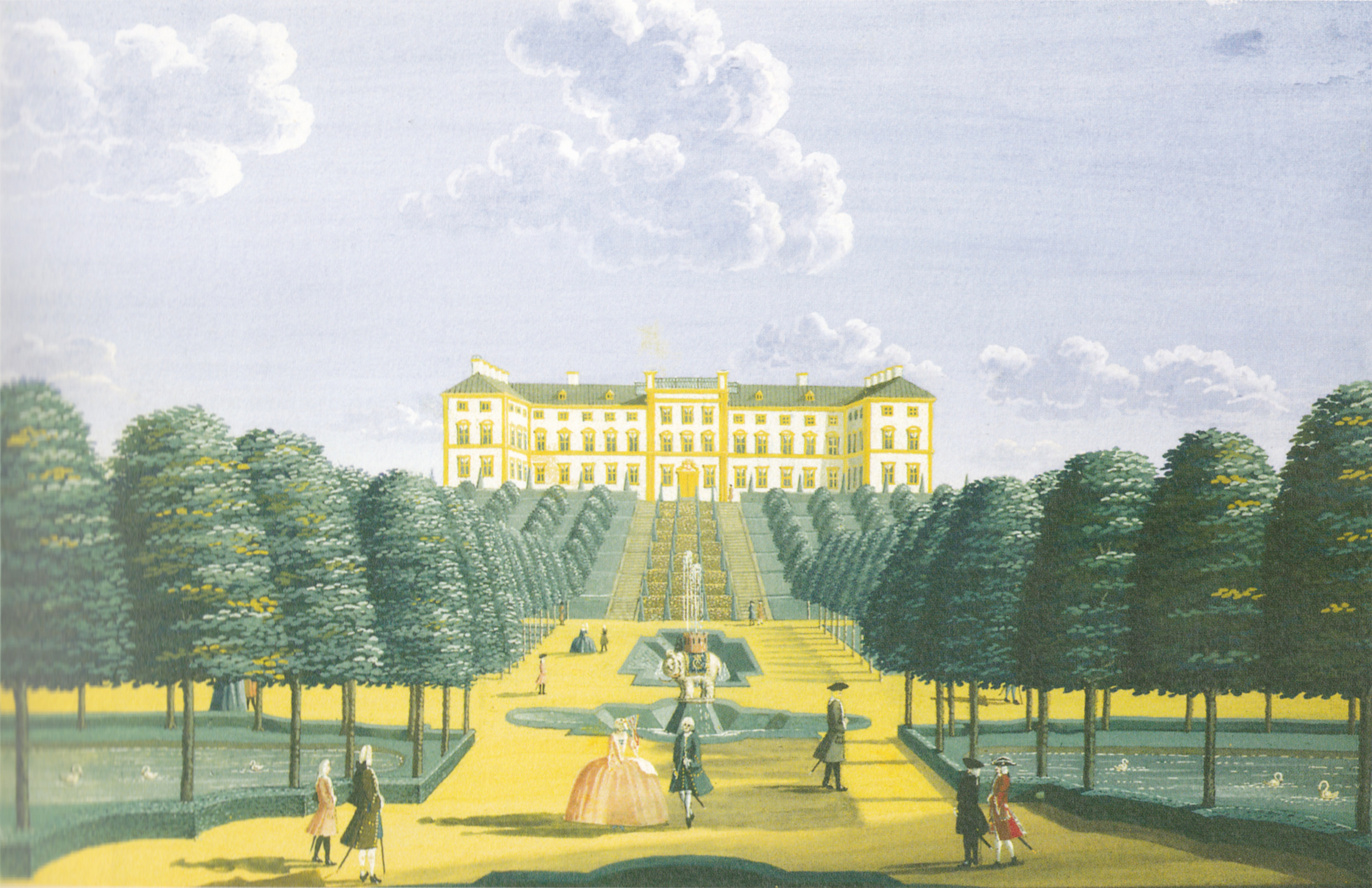
Frederiksberg Palace (1740)

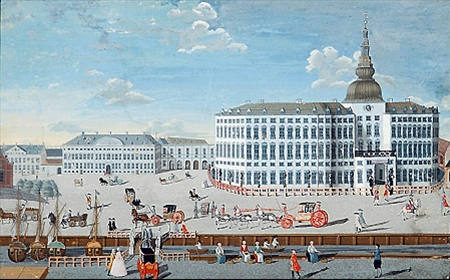
Slotsholmen

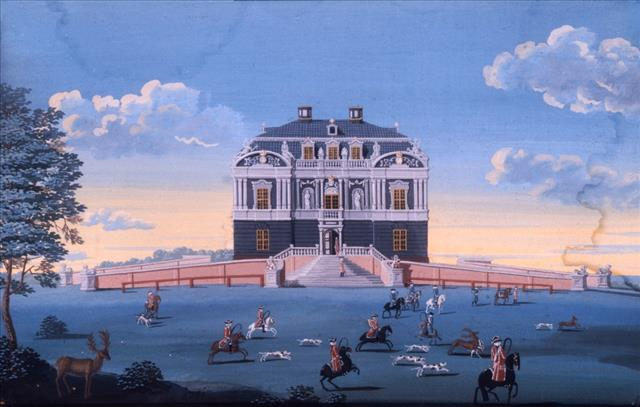
The Hermitage in Jægersborg Dyrehave

== See also ==
- Art of Denmark
- List of Danish painters
