= Berling =

Berling may refer to:

- Berling, Moselle, France
- Berling (surname)
- Berlingr, a dwarf in the short story "Sörla þáttr"

== See also ==
- Berlin (disambiguation)
- Berlinger (disambiguation)
- Berlingske
