= Berlingeri =

Berlingeri is an Italian surname that may refer to

- Cesare Berlingeri (born 1948), Italian painter
- Jaime Fuster Berlingeri (1941–2007), Puerto Rican politician
- Jesús Colón Berlingeri (born 1965), Puerto Rican politician
- René Berlingeri (born 1946), Puerto Rican Olympic shooter

== See also ==
- Berlinger (disambiguation)
