= Paul Laporte =

Paul Laporte may refer to:

- Paul Laporte (sport shooter) (born 1928), Canadian sport shooter
- Paul Carmel Laporte (1885–1973), Canadian physician, businessman and artist
