= Shooting at the 1976 Summer Olympics – Mixed skeet =

Sports shooting at the Olympics

Mixed skeet at the Games of the XXI Olympiad
- Venue: Montreal, Canada
- Date: 22–24 July 1976
- Competitors: 68 from 39 nations

Medalists
1st place, gold medalist(s)		Josef Panáček	Czechoslovakia
2nd place, silver medalist(s)		Eric Swinkels	Netherlands
3rd place, bronze medalist(s)		Wiesław Gawlikowski	Poland

The mixed skeet was a shooting sports event held as part of the Shooting at the 1976 Summer Olympics programme. It was the third appearance of the event. The competition was held on 22 to 24 July 1976 at the shooting ranges in Montreal. 68 shooters from 39 nations competed.

== Results ==
Place	Shooter	Total	Gold Shoot Off
1	Josef Panáček (TCH)	198	25+25
2	Eric Swinkels (NED)	198	25+24
3	Wiesław Gawlikowski (POL)	196	
4	Klaus Reschke (GDR)	196	
5	Franz Schitzhofer (AUT)	195	
6	Edgardo Zachrisson (GUA)	194	
7	Juan Ávalos (ESP)	194	
8	Jean-François Petitpied (FRA)	194	
9	Claus Koch (FRG)	194	
10	Yury Tsuranov (URS)	193	
11T	Chris Binet (BEL)	193	
11T	Romano Garagnani (ITA)	193	
11T	Firmo Roberti (ARG)	193	
14T	Enrique Camarena (ESP)	192	
14T	Anders Carlsson (SWE)	192	
14T	Aleksandr Cherkasov (URS)	192	
14T	Ernst Pedersen (DEN)	192	
14T	Pavel Pulda (TCH)	192	
14T	Hans Kjeld Rasmussen (DEN)	192	
14T	John Satterwhite (USA)	192	
14T	Andrzej Socharski (POL)	192	
22T	Lee Seung-gyun (KOR)	191	
22T	Joe Neville (GBR)	191	
22T	Athos Pisoni (BRA)	191	
22T	Ari Westergård (FIN)	191	
26T	Pavlos Kanellakis (GRE)	190	
26T	Dieter Monien (GDR)	190	
26T	Élie Pénot (FRA)	190	
26T	John Woolley (NZL)	190	
30T	Juan Bueno (MEX)	189	
30T	Roberto Castrillo (CUB)	189	
30T	Åke Call (SWE)	189	
30T	Romeu Luchiari Filho (BRA)	189	
30T	István Talabos (HUN)	189	
35T	Kazuyo Kato (JPN)	188	
35T	Anton Manolov (BUL)	188	
35T	Adalbert Oster (ROU)	188	
35T	Markus Remes (FIN)	188	
35T	Rubén Vega (CUB)	188	
35T	Harry Willsie (CAN)	188	
41T	Taro Aso (JPN)	187	
41T	Mirek Switalski (MEX)	187	
41T	Panagiotis Xanthakos (GRE)	187	
44T	Bradley Simmons (USA)	186	
44T	Antonio Yaqigi (CHI)	186	
44T	Güneş Yunus (TUR)	186	
47T	René Berlingeri (PUR)	184	
47T	Brian Hebditch (GBR)	184	
49	Rafael Batista (PUR)	182	
50T	Somchai Chanthavanij (THA)	181	
50T	Ernst Drexler (FRG)	181	
50T	Ally Ong (MAS)	181	
50T	Giuseppe Pepe (ITA)	181	
54T	Pichit Burapavong (THA)	179	
54T	Esfandiar Lari (IRI)	179	
56T	Sandhu Singh Gurbir (IND)	176	
56T	Paul Laporte (CAN)	176	
56T	Francisco Romero Arribas (GUA)	176	
59	Antonio Handal (CHI)	174	
60	Chow Tsun Man (HKG)	172	
61	Park Do-keun (KOR)	172	
62T	Kamil Jafari (IRI)	170	
62T	Li Un-hwa (PRK)	170	
64	Edmund Yong (MAS)	169	
65	Russell Johnson (ISV)	168	
66	Felix Navarro (ISV)	165	
67	Bhim Singh (IND)	161	
68	Tso Hok Young (HKG)	155	
