= Hafnia Hodierna =

1748 book by Laurids de Thurah

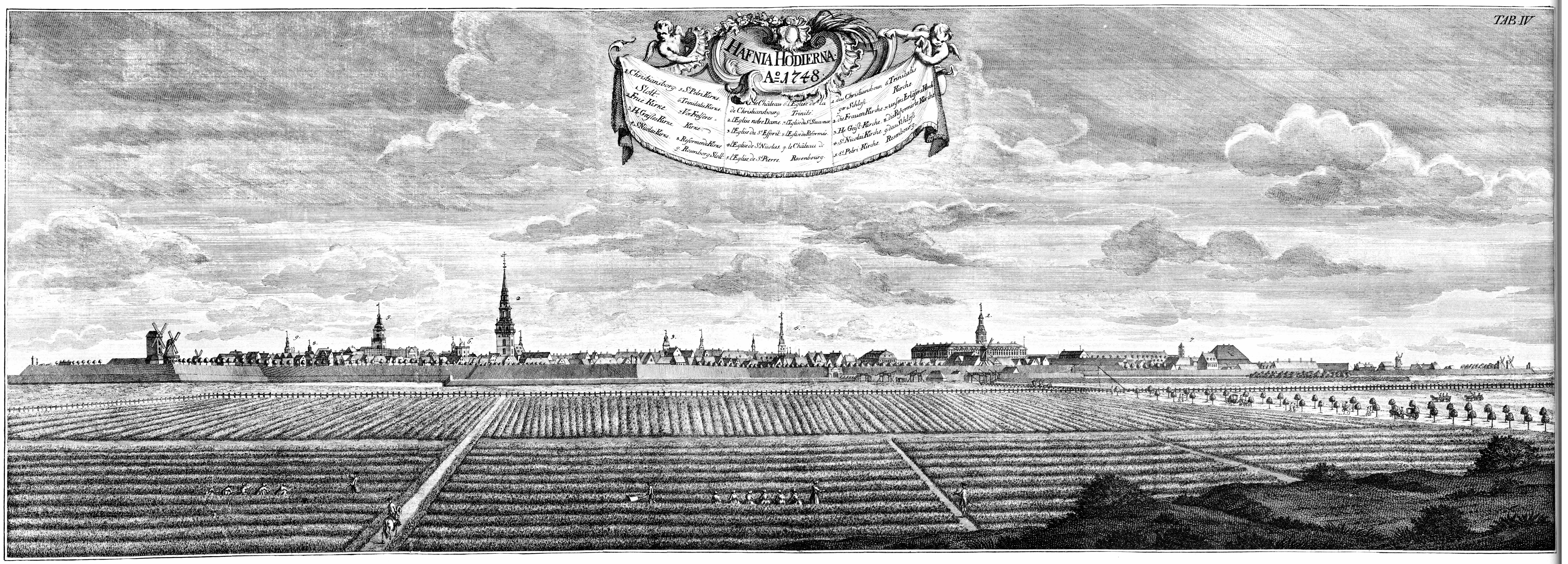
- View of Copenhagen
- Author: Lauritz de Thurah
- Subject: Danish architecture
- Publisher: Ernst Henrich Berling
- Publication date: 1748
- Publication place: Denmark

Hafnia Hodierna, Eller Udførlig Beskrivelse om den Kongelige Residentz- og Hoved-Stad Kiøbenhavn (English: Hafnia Hodierna, Or Detailed Description of the Royal Residence and Capital City Copenhagen) is an engraved architectural work on Copenhagen, published by the Danish architect Lauritz de Thurah in 1748. Profusely illustrated throughout, it is a valuable source of knowledge as to the appearance of Copenhagen in the middle of the 18th century. It complements, with some overlap, de Thurah's other major work Den Danske Vitruvius, which focuses primarily on surrounding areas (such as Fredensborg), as well as the rest of Denmark.

In 1967, Rosenkilde & Bagger published a facsimile edition, edited by Svend Cedergreen Bech.

Hafnia Hodierna is Latin for "Copenhagen of today".

== History ==
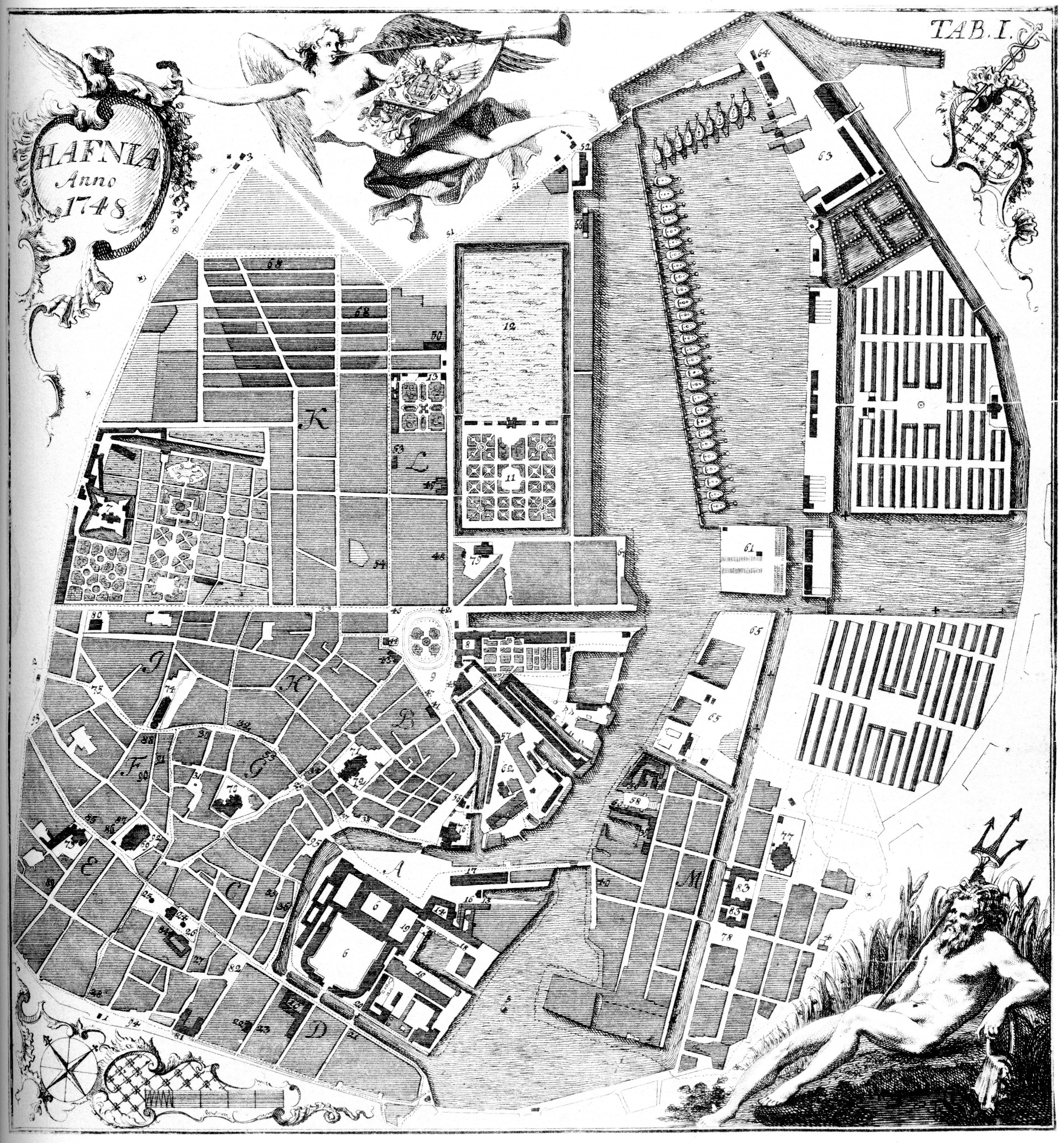
Map of Copenhagen - the first illustration of Hafnia Hodierna

Lauritz de Thurah had a military education and was a self-taught architect who learned much of what he knew by studying the inspiring buildings he saw on his travels outside Denmark between 1729 and 1731. His architectural writings can be seen as a natural continuation of this interest.

In 1735 he received a royal grant to collect information and to write a comprehensive work on architecture in Denmark. Hafnia Hodierna appeared in 1748, published at the King's expense, and printed by the best Danish printer at that time, Ernst Henrich Berling.

== Contents ==
Published as a single quarto volume, Hafnia Hodierna contains 110 plates. It provides important contemporary descriptions, engraved views, and architectural plans of all the principal buildings in Copenhagen, including the three Royal Palaces, other government and public buildings, the townhouses of the aristocracy, and the city's numerous churches. All the views are the work of the skillful drawer Johan Jacob Bruun, while the plans, sections and elevations were made by others, including de Thurah personally. Text appears in Danish, French, and German in parallel columns.

== Gallery ==
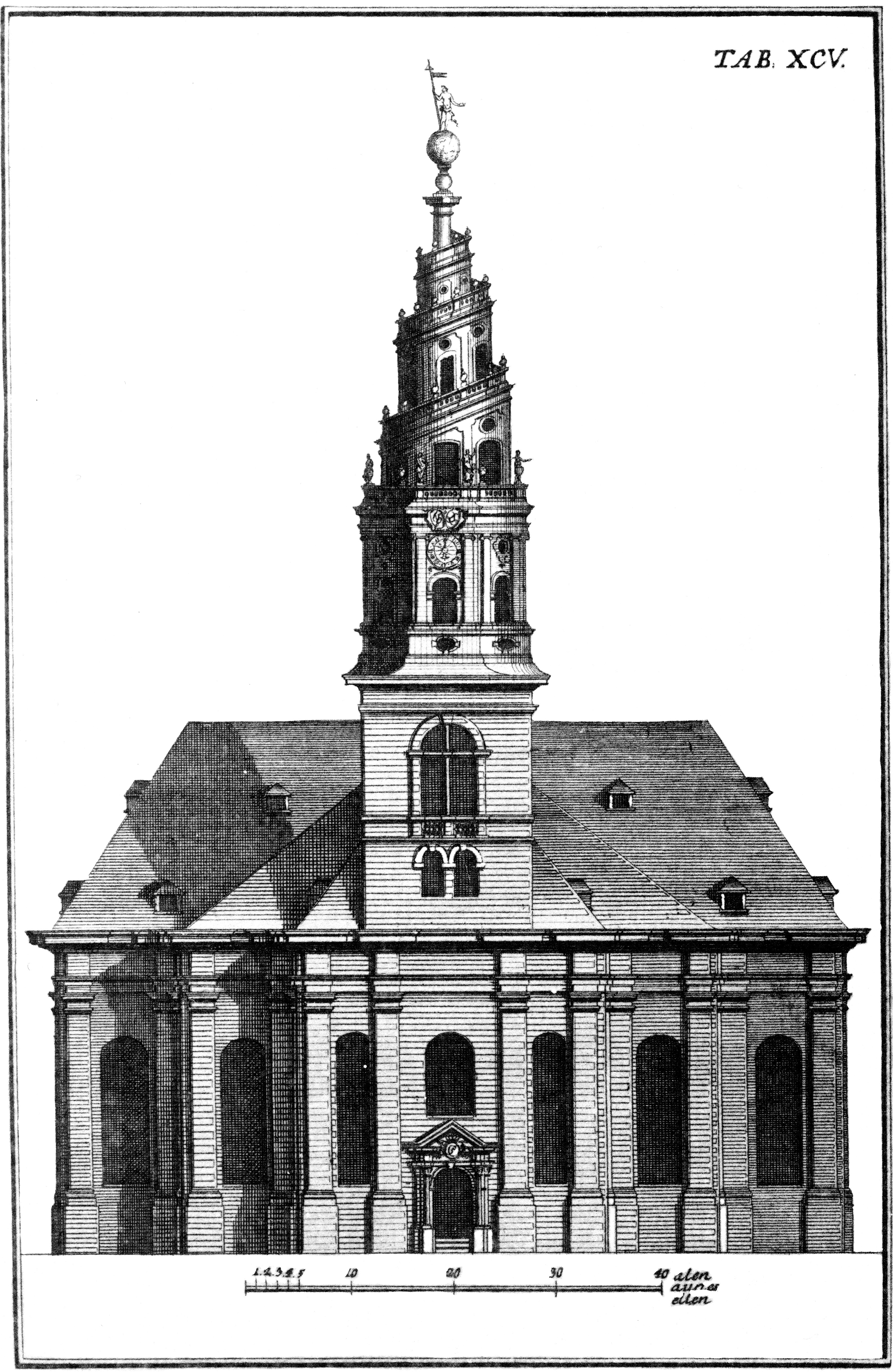
Tab. XCV. Church of Our Saviour, first proposal for spiral spire

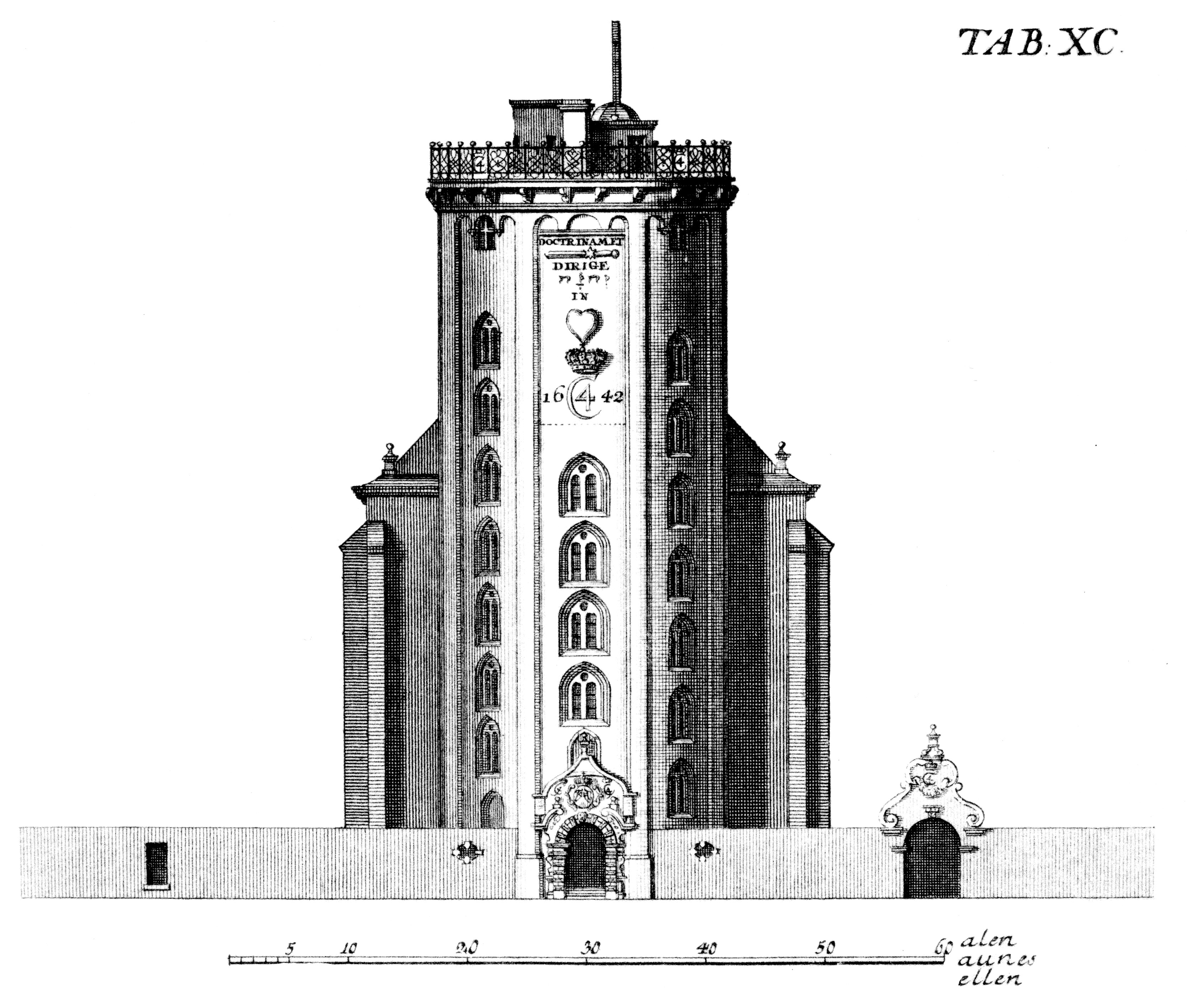
Tab.XC. Rundetårn

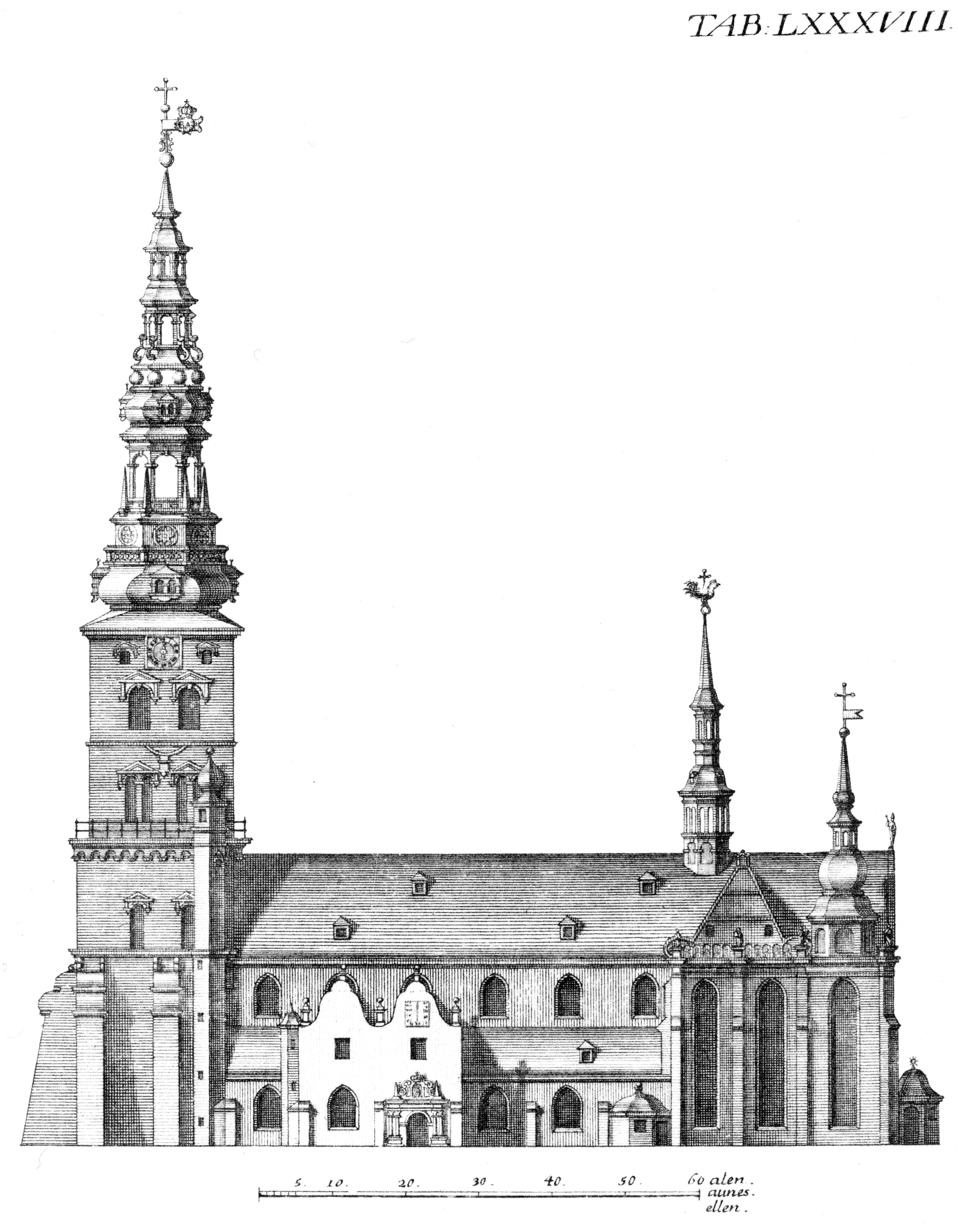
Tab.LXXXVIII. Church of Sankt Nikolaj.

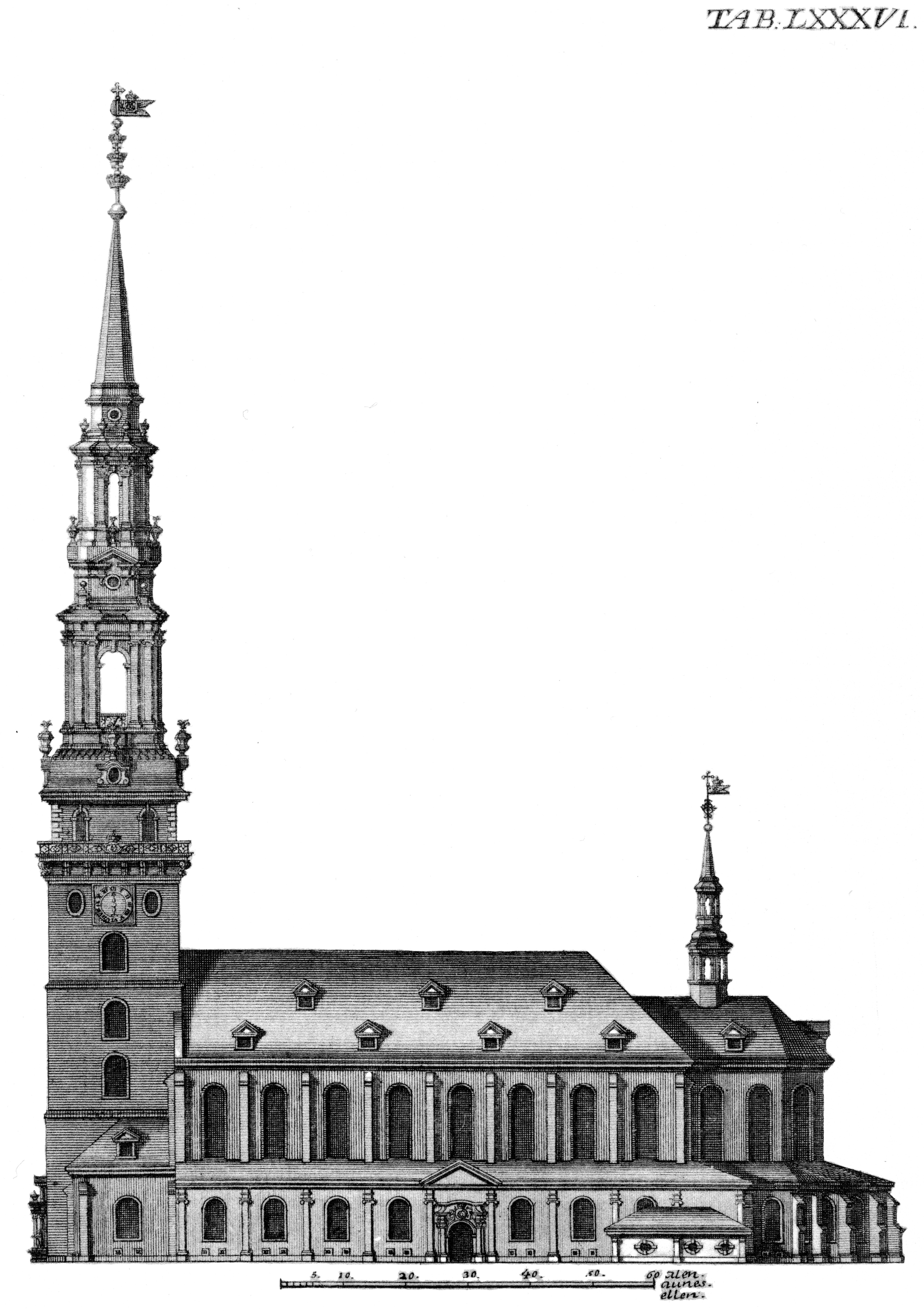
Tab.LXXXVI, Church of Our Lady

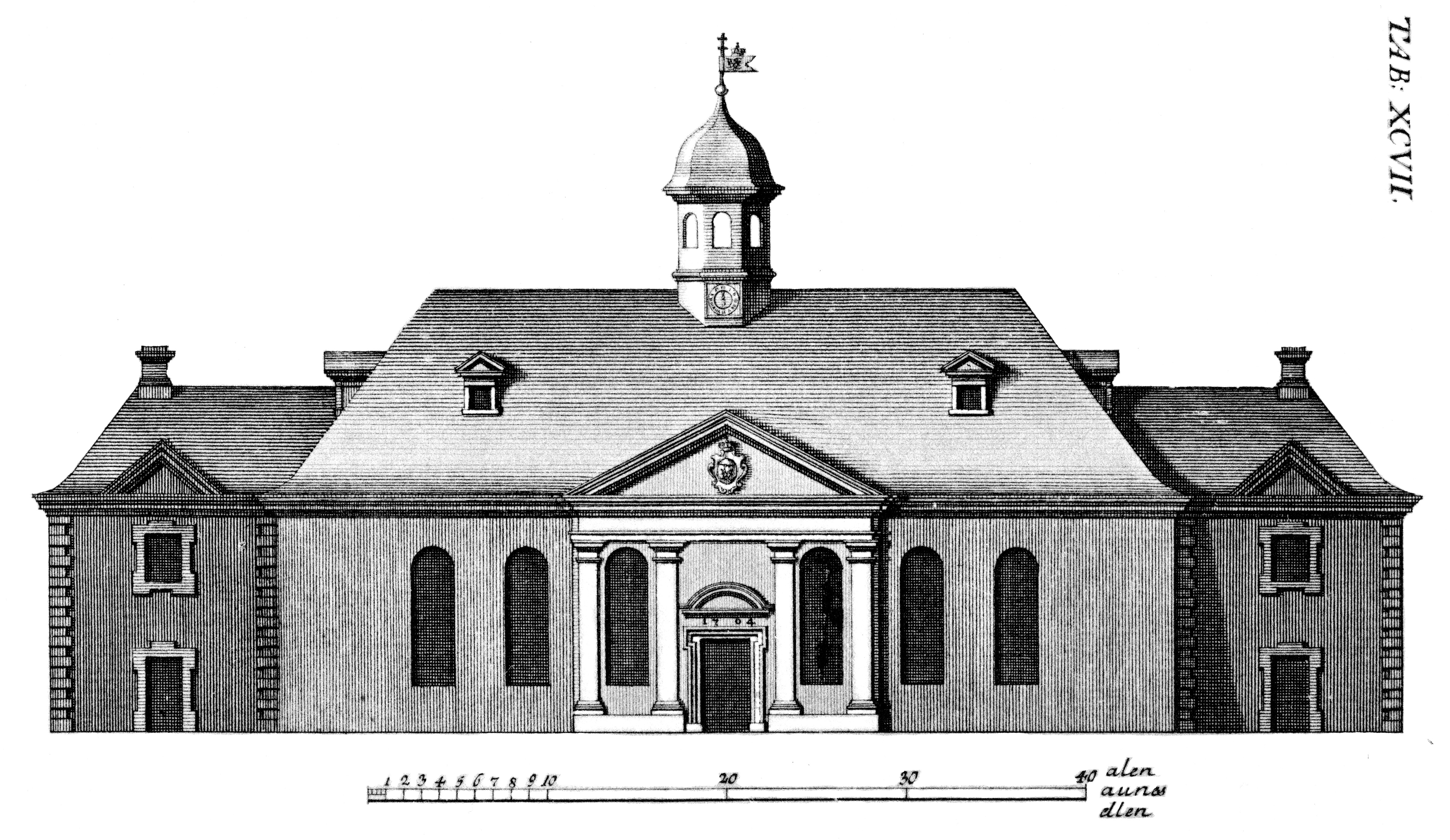
Tab XCVII. The Church at Kastellet

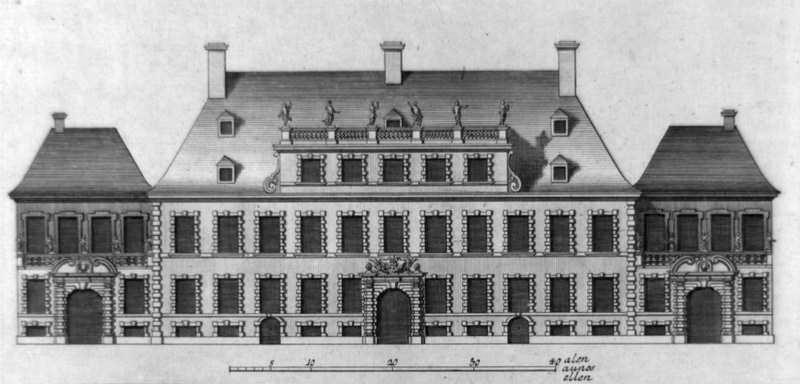
Townhouse of the count Ulrich Adolph Holstein, chancellor, at Kongens Nytorv (since demolished).

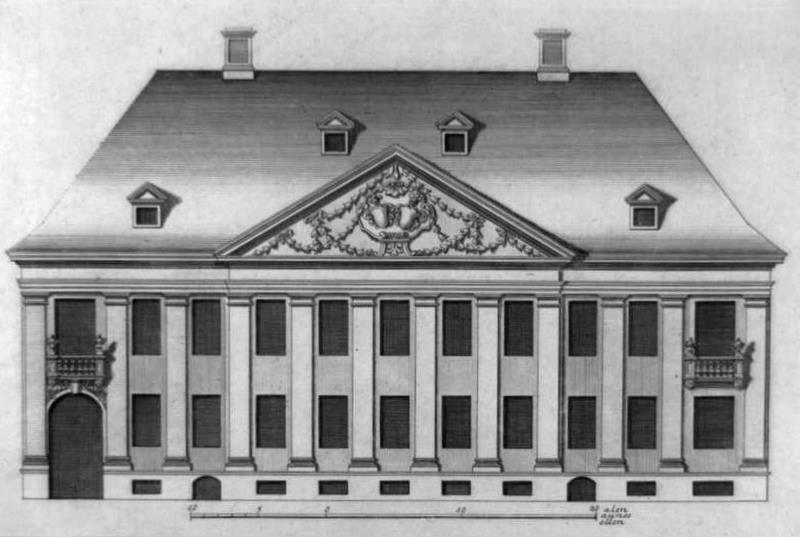
Townhouse of count Johan Ludvig Holstein in Stormgade. The building is depicted in the state it had before the expansion in 1756 by Jacob Fortling.

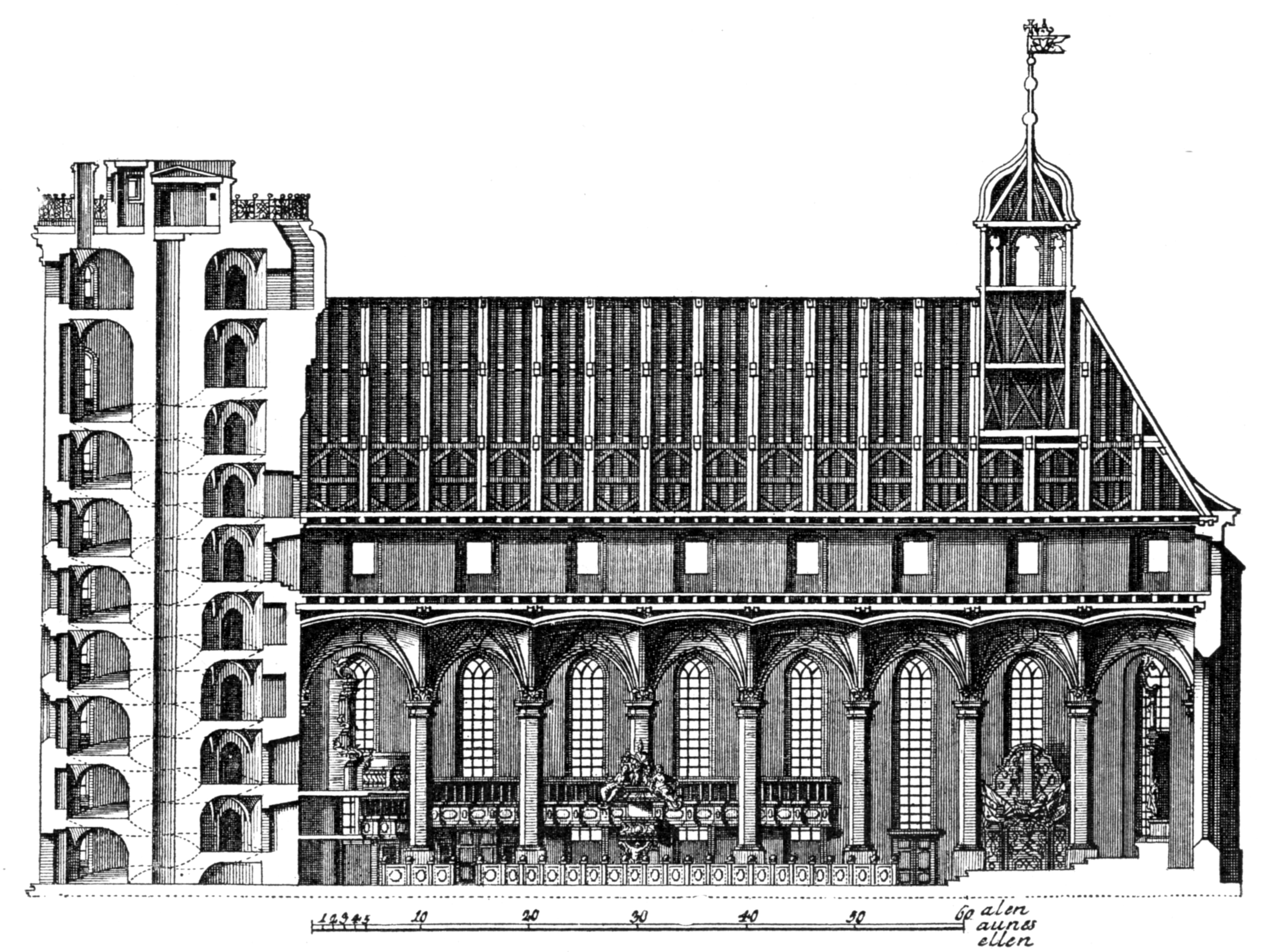
Cross section of Trinitatis Church and Rundetårn

== See also ==
- Lauritz de Thurah
- Den Danske Vitruvius
- Architecture of Denmark
