= Kanellakis =

Kanellakis is a surname. Notable eople associated with the surname include:

- Paris Kanellakis
- Alexandra Kanellakis
- Pavlos Kanellakis

== See also ==
- Paris Kanellakis Award
