= Anders Carlsson =

Anders Carlsson may refer to:

- Anders Carlsson (ice hockey)
- Anders Carlsson (politician)
- Anders Carlsson (sport shooter)

== See also ==
- Anders Carlson (disambiguation)
