= Gurbir =

Gurbir is a given name. It may refer to:

- Gurbir Grewal (born 1973), American attorney and prosecutor
- Gurbir Singh Sandhu (born 1951), Indian sports shooter
