= Bradley Simmons =

American sports shooter

Personal information
- Born: September 16, 1955 (age 70) Houston, Texas, United States

Sport
- Sport: Sports shooting

Bradley Simmons (born September 16, 1955) is an American sports shooter. He competed in the mixed skeet event at the 1976 Summer Olympics.
