= Esfandiar Lari =

Iranian sports shooter

Personal information
- Nationality: Iranian
- Born: 3 February 1939 (age 86)

Sport
- Sport: Sports shooting

Esfandiar Lari (born 3 February 1939) is an Iranian sports shooter. He competed in the mixed skeet event at the 1976 Summer Olympics.
