= Kamil Jafari =

Iranian sports shooter

Personal information
- Full name: Kamil Jafari Tabrizi
- Nationality: Iranian
- Born: 24 January 1946 (age 79)

Sport
- Sport: Sports shooting

Kamil Jafari Tabrizi (Persian: کامیل جعفری تبریزی, born 24 January 1946) is an Iranian sports shooter. He competed in the mixed skeet event at the 1976 Summer Olympics.
