= Tso Hok Young =

Hong Kong sports shooter

Personal information
- Nationality: Hong Konger
- Born: 29 February 1932 (age 93)

Sport
- Sport: Sports shooting

Tso Hok Young (born 29 February 1932) is a Hong Kong sports shooter. He competed in the mixed skeet event at the 1976 Summer Olympics.
