= Åke Call =

Swedish sports shooter

Personal information
- Nationality: Swedish
- Born: 17 January 1942 (age 83); Motala, Sweden

Sport
- Sport: Sports shooting

Åke Call (born 17 January 1942) is a Swedish sports shooter. He competed in the mixed skeet event at the 1976 Summer Olympics.
