= Edmund Yong =

Malaysian sports shooter

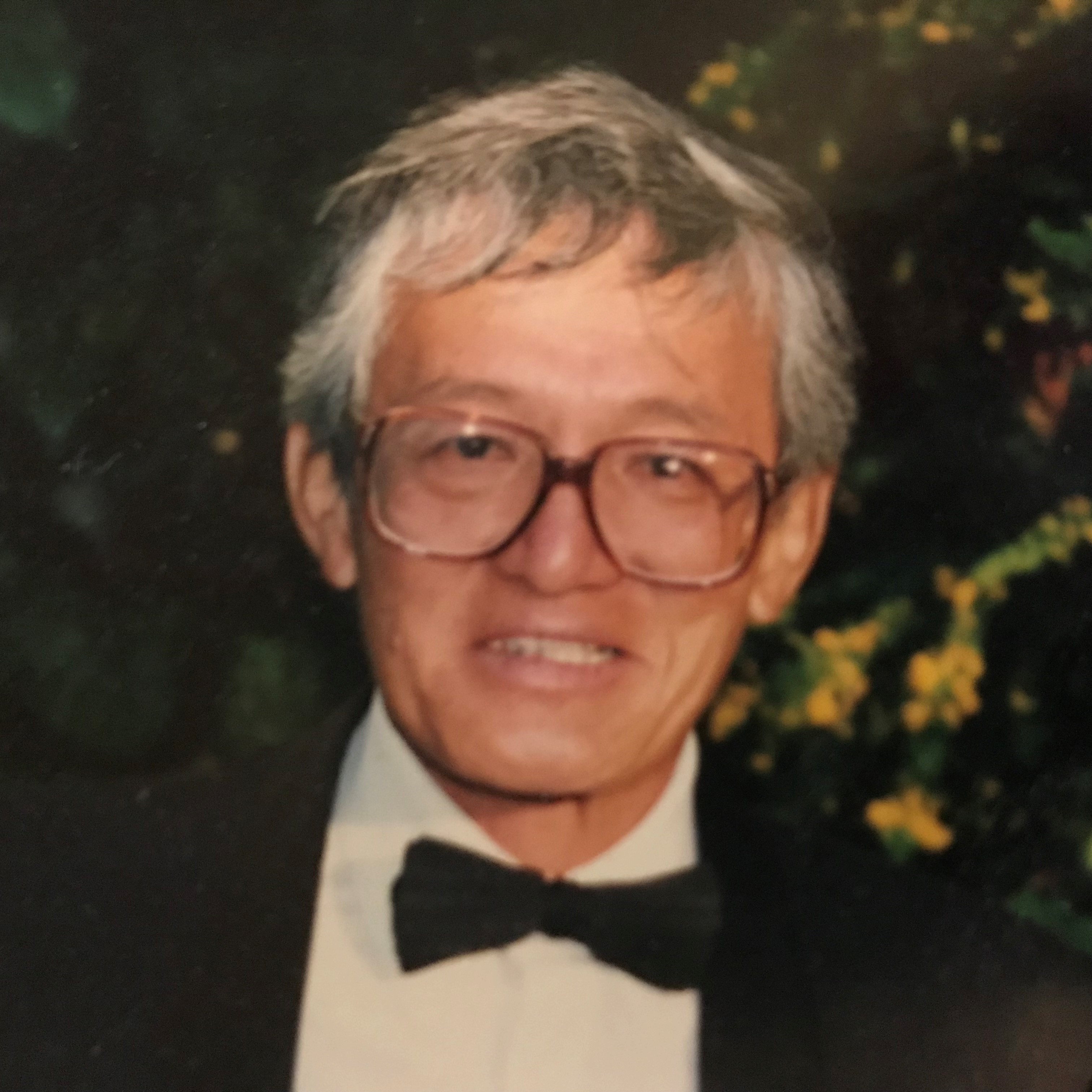

Personal information
- Full name: Edmund Yong Joon Hong
- Nationality: Malaysian
- Born: 3 July 1936 (age 90) Kuala Lumpur, Malaysia
- Died: 9 July, 1997 Kuala Lumpur, Malaysia
- Spouse: Glennys Mary Eastham (m. 1963)

Sport
- Sport: Sports shooting

Edmund Yong (3 July 1936 - 9 July 1997) was a Malaysian sports shooter. He competed in the mixed skeet event at the 1976 Summer Olympics. Other notable achievements include Secretary-General of the Asia Pacific Golf Federation from 1977 to 1996. Yong was also involved in Vijay Singh's disqualification from the Asian Tour.
