= Brian Hebditch =

British sports shooter (1948–2023)

Personal information
- Nationality: British
- Born: 15 June 1948; Cheltenham, England
- Died: 1 November 2023 (aged 75); Titchfield, England

Sport
- Sport: Sports shooting

Anthony Brian Hebditch (15 June 1948 – 1 November 2023) was a British sports shooter. He competed in the mixed skeet event at the 1976 Summer Olympics.

== Career ==
In October 1972, Hebditch represented England in the skeet event at the European Commonwealth Shooting Championships alongside David Seabrook and Alec Bennett. The team finished in all three podium positions.

In May 1979, Hebditch won the British Open Sporting Championship of the Clay Pigeon Shooting Association.

== Personal life ==
Hebditch was hit by a lorry outside a garden centre in Titchfield, near Southampton, on 1 November 2023, and was declared dead at the scene. He was 75.
