= Anders Carlson =

Anders Carlson may refer to:

- Anders Carlson (runner) (born 1959), Swedish runner
- Anders Carlson (American football) (born 1998), American football player
- Anders Carlson-Wee (born 1985), American poet

== See also ==
- Anders Carlsson (disambiguation)
