= Ernst Henrich Berling =

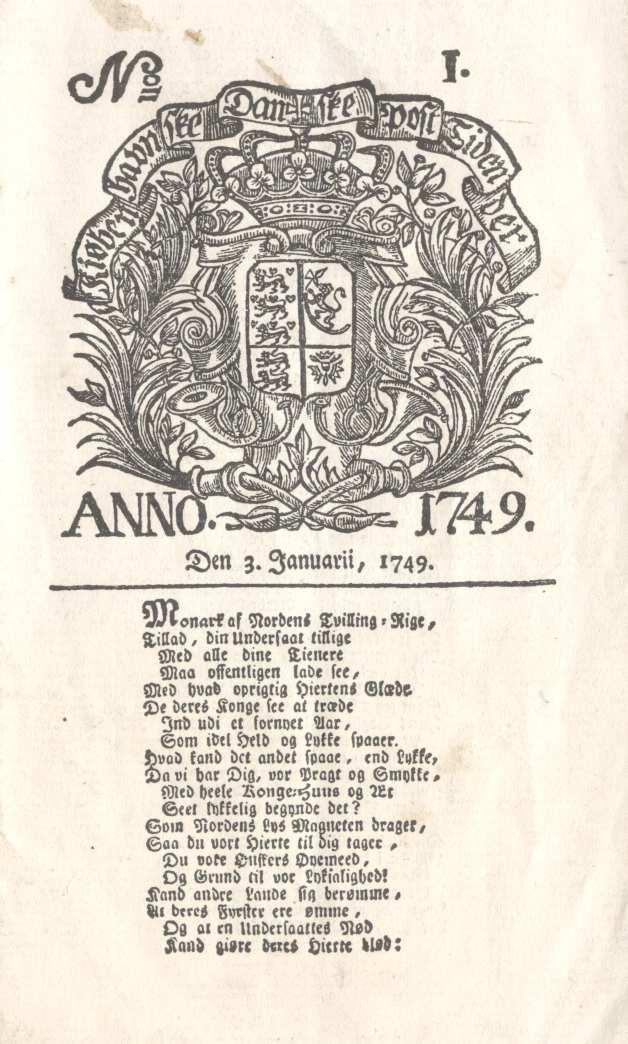
Front page of Kjøbenhavnske Danske Post-Tidender, today Berlingske Tidende, in 1749

Ernst Henrich Berling (22 March 1708 – 16 October 1750) was a German-Danish book printer and publisher. From 1749 he published Danske Post Tidender, which would later become Berlingske Tidende.

== Biography ==
Berling was born in Mecklenburg as the son of mounted forest ranger Melchior Christian Berling and Catharina Hennings. He was taught book printing in Lauenburg and in 1731 he was invited to Copenhagen by book printer Johan Jørgen Høpfner, whose stepdaughter Cecilie Cathrine Godiche, daughter of book printer Jørgen Matthiasen Godiche, he married the following year. They founded the Danish Berling Dynasty of printers and publishers.

In 1733 he set up a printing business and in 1747 he was appointed Royal Book Printer. On 27 December 1748, he received a license to publish newspapers, Danish, German, French and scholarly, which he had acquired from Inger Wielandt, a printer's widow. Most notable among these was his Kjøbenhavnske Danske Post-Tidender, now Berlingske Tidende, which was established in 1749. The paper set new standards for political news coverage and Danish media.

As a Royal Book Printer he published several of Ludvig Holberg's works as well as prestigious and lavish publications such as Lauritz de Thurah's profusely illustrated architectural works Den Danske Vitruvius I-II (1746–49) and Hafnia Hodierna (1748).
