= Adalbert Oster =

Romanian sports shooter

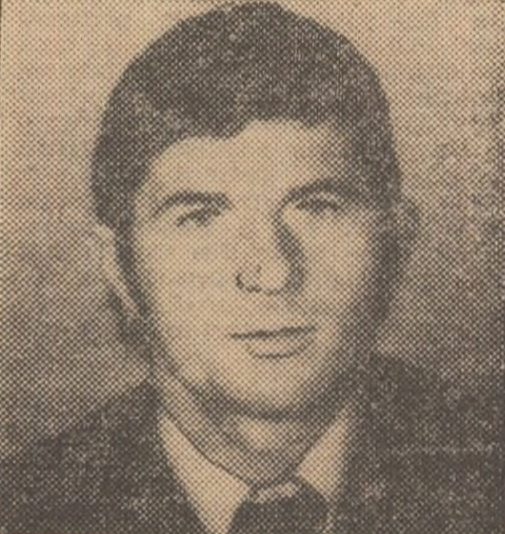
- Oster in 1976

Personal information
- Nationality: Romanian
- Born: 4 March 1944 (age 82) Timișoara, Romania

Sport
- Sport: Sports shooting

Adalbert Oster (born 4 March 1944) is a Romanian sports shooter. He competed in the mixed skeet event at the 1976 Summer Olympics.
