= Mario-Oscar Zachrisson =

Guatemalan sports shooter

Personal information
- Nationality: Guatemalan
- Born: 19 July 1952 (age 73)

Sport
- Sport: Sports shooting

Mario-Oscar Zachrisson (born 19 July 1952) is a Guatemalan sports shooter. He competed at the 1980 Summer Olympics and the 1984 Summer Olympics. He was a four-time medalist at the Central American and Caribbean Games and had a brother, Edgardo, who also competed internationally.
