= Giuseppe Pepe =

Italian sports shooter

Personal information
- Nationality: Italian
- Born: 27 January 1949 (age 76); Rome, Italy

Sport
- Sport: Sports shooting

Giuseppe Pepe (born 27 January 1949) is an Italian sports shooter. He competed in the mixed skeet event at the 1976 Summer Olympics.
