= Andrzej Socharski =

Polish sports shooter (1947–2024)

Personal information
- Nationality: Polish
- Born: 31 August 1947 Warsaw, Poland
- Died: 8 September 2024 (aged 77)

Sport
- Sport: Sports shooting

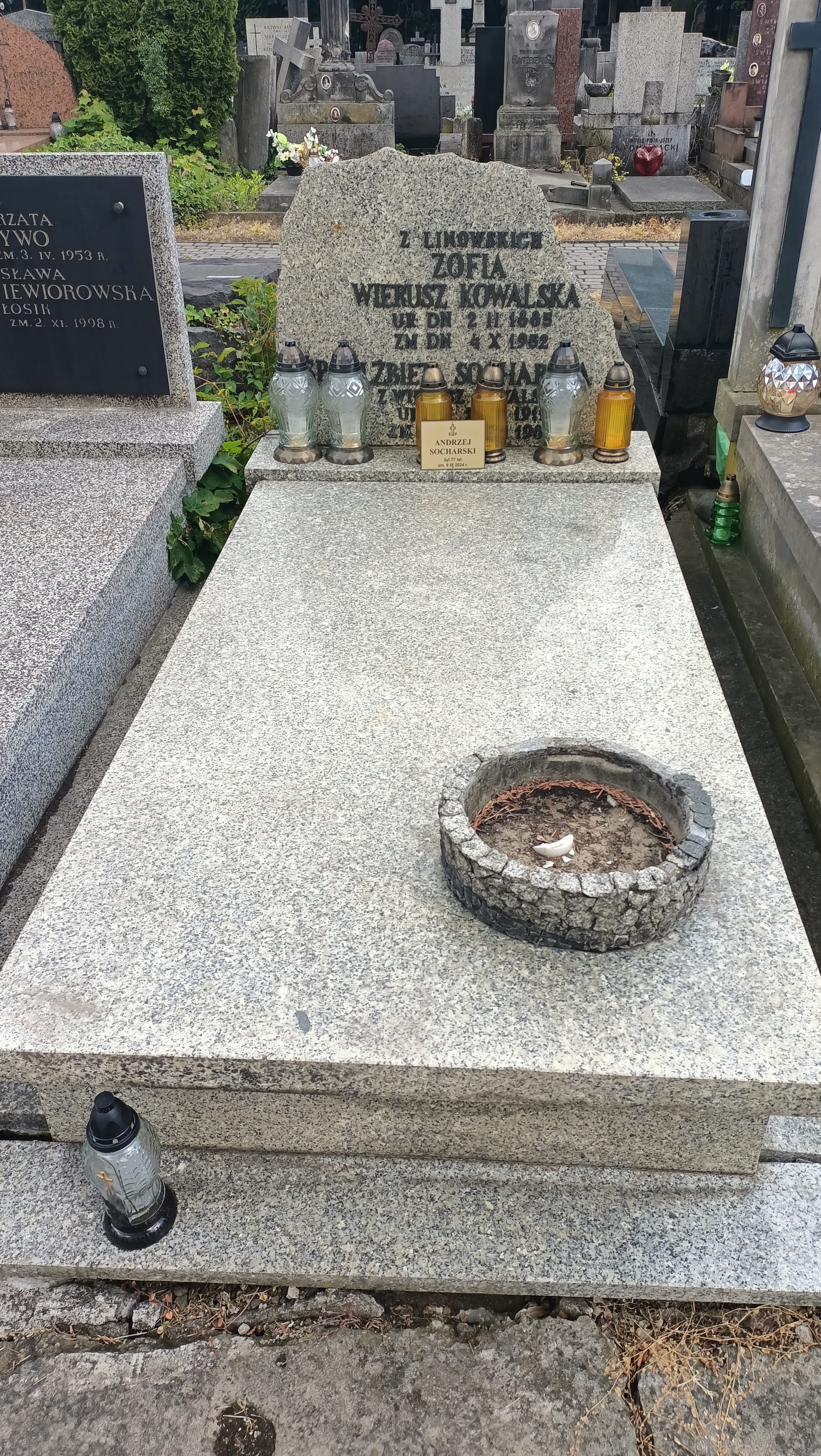
The grave of Andrzej Socharski at the Powązki Cemetery in Warsaw

Andrzej Socharski (31 August 1947 – 8 September 2024) was a Polish sports shooter. He competed in the mixed skeet event at the 1976 Summer Olympics.

He died on 8 September 2024.
