= Felix Navarro =

Sports shooter

Personal information
- Nationality: American Virgin Islander
- Born: 1936 (age 88–89)

Sport
- Sport: Sports shooting

Felix Navarro (born 1936) is a sports shooter who represents the United States Virgin Islands. He competed in the mixed skeet event at the 1976 Summer Olympics.
