= Russell Johnson (sport shooter) =

Sports shooter

Personal information
- Nationality: American Virgin Islander
- Born: February 21, 1920
- Died: September 14, 1991 (aged 71)

Sport
- Sport: Sports shooting

Russell Johnson (February 21, 1920 – September 14, 1991) was a sports shooter who represents the United States Virgin Islands. He competed in the mixed skeet event at the 1976 Summer Olympics.
