= Antonio Handal =

Chilean sports shooter

Personal information
- Nationality: Chilean
- Born: 23 September 1951 (age 73)

Sport
- Sport: Sports shooting

Antonio Handal (born 23 September 1951) is a Chilean sports shooter. He competed in the mixed skeet event at the 1976 Summer Olympics.
