= Markus Remes =

Finnish sports shooter

Personal information
- Nationality: Finnish
- Born: 26 April 1954 (age 70); Oulu, Finland

Sport
- Sport: Sports shooting

Markus Remes (born 26 April 1954) is a Finnish sports shooter. He competed in the mixed skeet event at the 1976 Summer Olympics.
