= Berling (surname) =

Berling is a surname. Notable people with the surname include:

- Charles Berling (born 1958), French actor and director
- Ernst Henrich Berling (1708–1750), German-Danish book printer and publisher
- Heinrich Berling (1817–1896), German politician
- Peter Berling (1934–2017), German actor and writer
- Zygmunt Berling (1896–1980), Polish general

== Fictional characters ==
- Gösta Berling, main character of Gösta Berlings Saga by Selma Lagerlöf
