= Li Un-hwa =

North Korean sports shooter

Personal information
- Nationality: North Korean
- Born: 7 March 1950 (age 75)

Sport
- Sport: Sports shooting

Li Un-hwa (born 7 March 1950) is a North Korean sports shooter. He competed in the mixed skeet event at the 1976 Summer Olympics.
