= Berlinger =

Berlinger may refer to:

- Berlinger & Co. AG, a company producing doping control systems in Ganterschwil, Switzerland
- Barney Berlinger (1908–2002), American decathlete
- Joe Berlinger (born 1961), American documentary film-maker
- Robert Berlinger (born 1958), American film and television director
- Warren Berlinger (1937–2020), American actor

== See also ==
- Berling (disambiguation)
- Berlingeri, a surname
- Berlingerode, in Thuringia, Germany
- Berlinguer, a surname
