= Dieter Monien =

German sports shooter

Personal information
- Nationality: German
- Born: 26 May 1950 (age 74); Brandenburg, Germany

Sport
- Sport: Sports shooting

Dieter Monien (born 26 May 1950) is a German sports shooter. He competed in the mixed skeet event at the 1976 Summer Olympics.
