= Ernst Drexler =

German sports shooter

Personal information
- Nationality: German
- Born: 30 July 1944 (age 80); Vienna, Austria

Sport
- Sport: Sports shooting

Ernst Drexler (born 30 July 1944) is a German sports shooter. He competed in the mixed skeet event at the 1976 Summer Olympics.
