= Gurbir Singh Sandhu =

Indian sports shooter (born 1951)

Personal information
- Nationality: Indian
- Born: 20 February 1951 (age 74)

Sport
- Sport: Sports shooting

Gurbir Singh Sandhu (born 20 February 1951) is an Indian sports shooter. He competed in the mixed skeet event at the 1976 Summer Olympics. He also served as the President of the Punjab Rifle Shooting Association and was awarded the Arjuna Award in 2001. In 2017 he was convicted of possessing wild boar tusks without a license, a violation of the Wildlife (Protection) Act.
