= Den Danske Vitruvius =

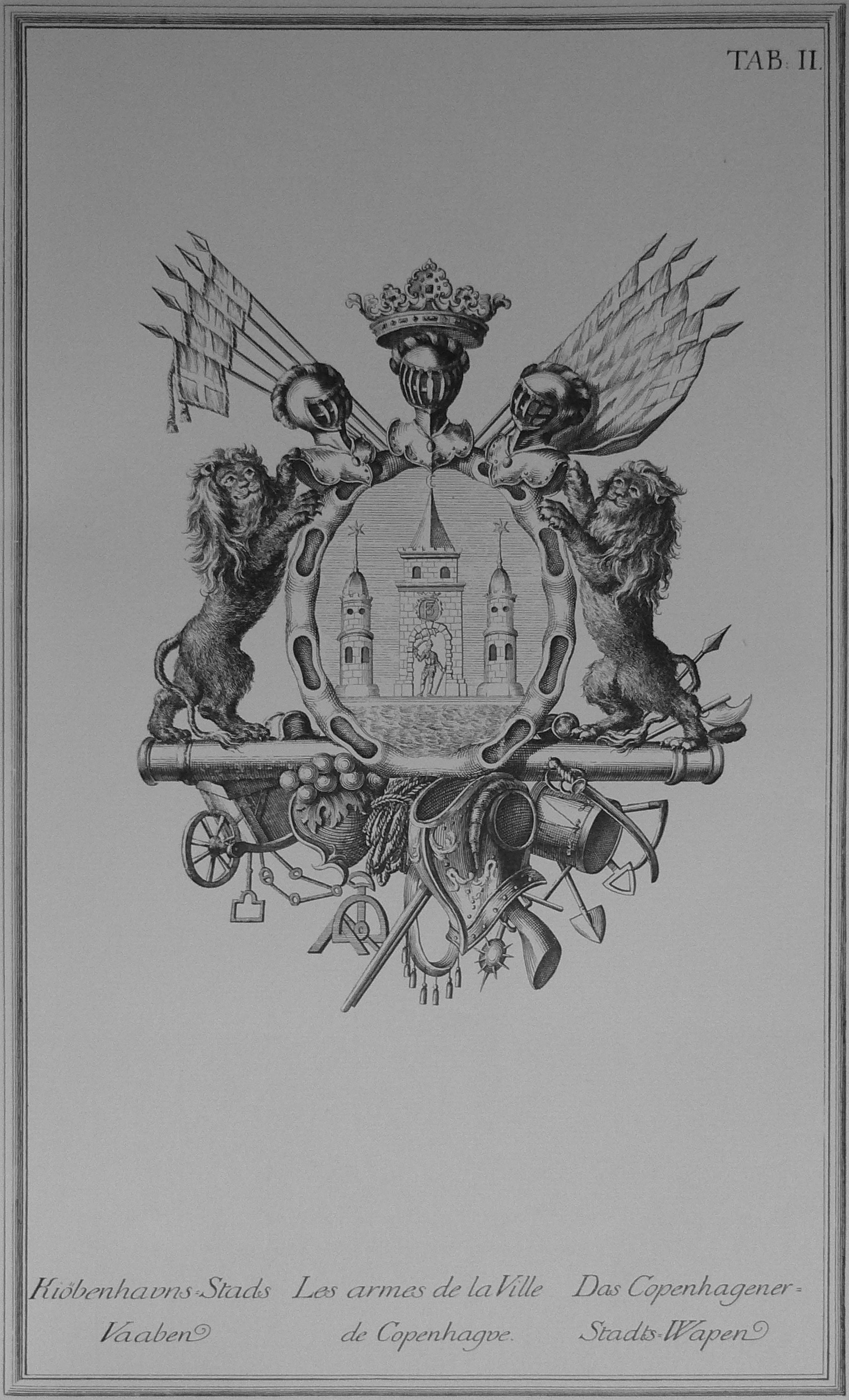
- The coat of arms of Copenhagen
- Author: Lauritz de Thurah
- Subject: Danish architecture
- Publisher: Ernst Henrich Berling
- Publication date: 1746–49
- Publication place: Denmark

Den Danske Vitruvius (English: The Danish Vitruvius) is a richly illustrated 18th-century architectural work on Danish monumental buildings of the period, written by the Danish Baroque architect Lauritz de Thurah. It was commissioned by Christian VI in 1735 and published in two volumes between 1746 and 1749. The title refers to the Roman architect and engineer Vitruvius, who published De architectura in the 1st century AD, an authoritative treatise on the architecture of the time. The direct inspiration for de Thurah's Den Danske Vitruvius was Colen Campbell's Vitruvius Britannicus.

With its numerous illustrations, Den Danske Vitruvius is a valuable source of information on the many Danish buildings of the mid-18th century, which have since been demolished, rebuilt or lost in fires.

A facsimile edition published in 1966–67 includes a third volume, based on an until then unpublished manuscript kept at the Royal Danish Library. It covers buildings completed later than 1749.

== History ==
Lauritz de Thurah had a military education and was a self-taught architect who learned much of what he knew by studying the inspiring buildings he saw on his travels outside Denmark between 1729 and 1731. His architectural writings can be seen as a natural continuation of this interest.

In 1735, de Thurah received a royal grant to collect information and to write a comprehensive work on architecture in Denmark, detailing all the royal buildings in the country.

It appeared between 1746 and 1749, published at the King's expense, and printed by the best Danish printer at that time, Ernst Henrich Berling.

== Contents ==
Den Danske Vitruvius provides a richly illustrated documentation of monumental Danish buildings of the period. Like Campbell's work, it is not a treatise in the empirical vein but basically a cateloque of designs. Descriptions are short and text appears in Danish, French, and German in parallel columns.

The first volume, with 121 plates, covers the most important buildings in Copenhagen within all categories, down to two burgouis houses at Kongens Nytorv. The second volume has 161 plates and covers all royal palaces and other buildings of note in the rest of Denmark.

Buildings are shown in plan, section and elevation as well as many bird's-eye perspective. All prospects are drawn by Johan Jacob Bruun. Many of the plates were executed by Michael Keyl and C.L. Wüst, two German engravers who were commissioned by Thurah especially for the project.

== Significance ==
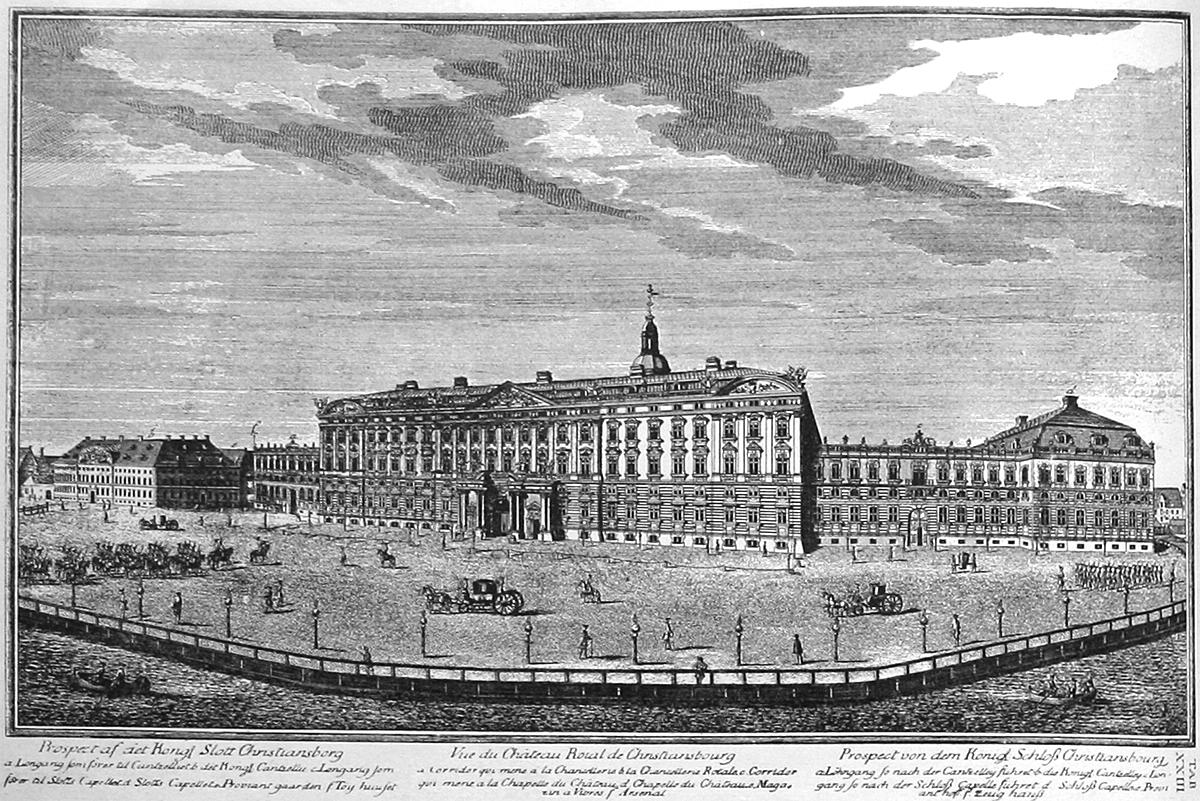
The first Christiansborg before it was ruined by a fire in 1794

Den Danske Vitruvius is a valuable source of knowledge about the design of many buildings and landscaped gardens in mid-18th century Denmark, many of which no longer exist. Some, like Copenhagen's city gates, have been demolished, while others, such as the first Christiansborg, were destroyed by fire. Still others have simply been redesigned or otherwise altered to satisfy contemporary tastes and functions.

The book is also an important source of information on the landscape architecture of the time. It offers valuable, contemporary illustrated records of works by Johan Cornelius Krieger, the leading landscape architect of Frederik IV, who brought the Baroque garden to life in Denmark. De Thurah's work shows Fredensborg prior to the extensive modifications instituted by Nicolas-Henri Jardin in the 1760s under the direction of Frederik V, who made Fredensborg the favoured royal summer residence.

== Gallery ==
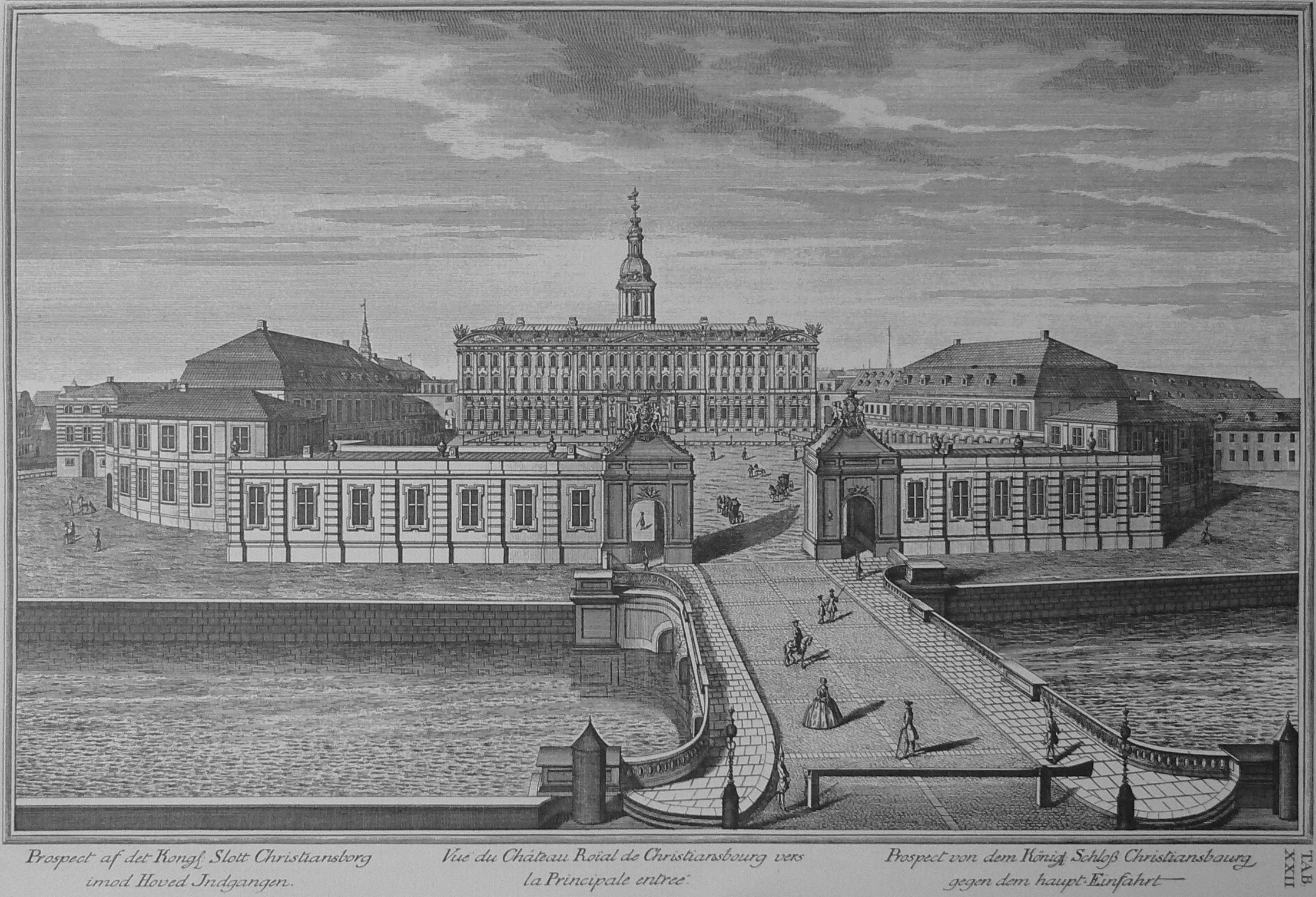
Prospect of Christiansborg Palace as seen towards the main entrance

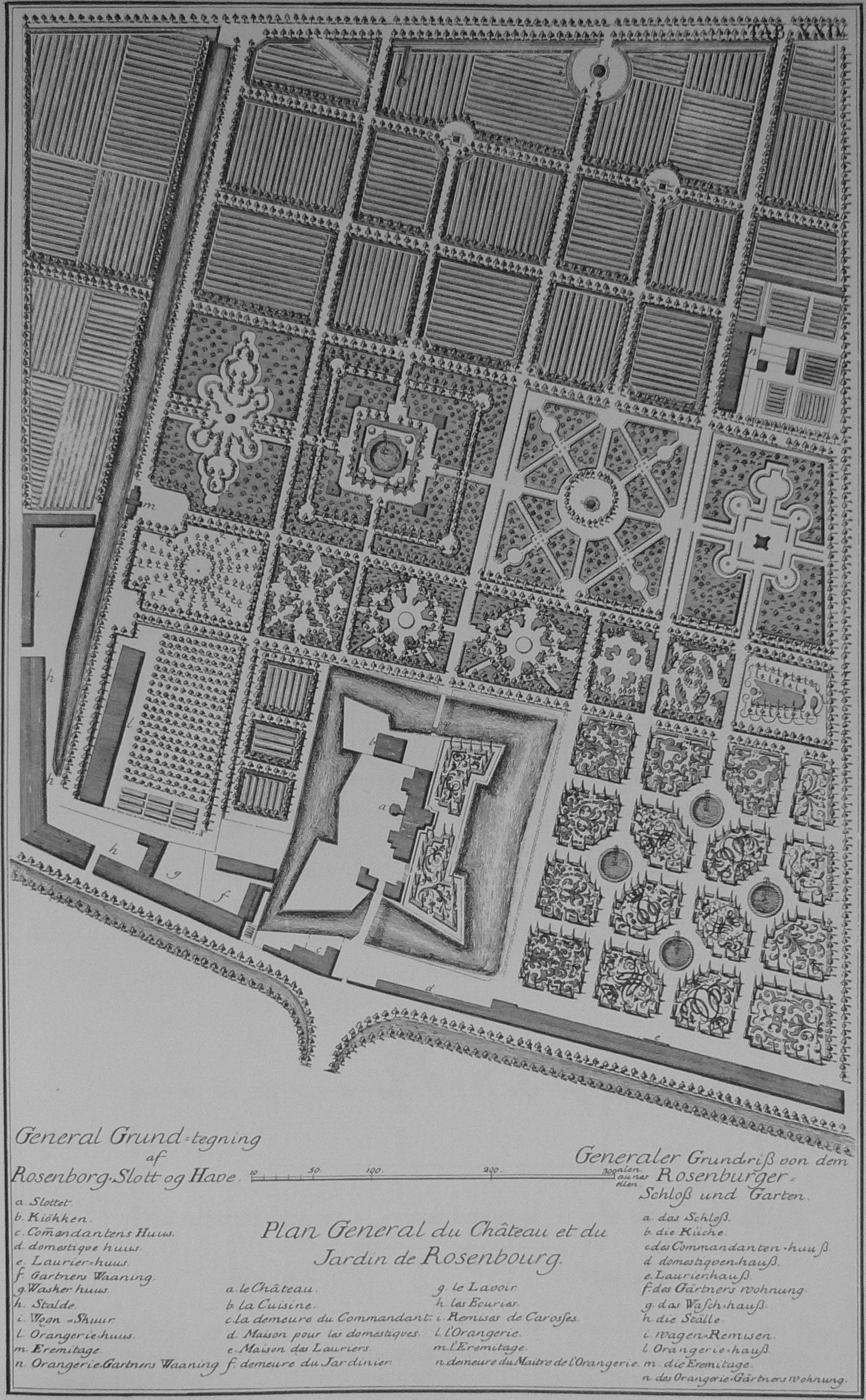
General plan of Rosenborg Castle and castle gardens

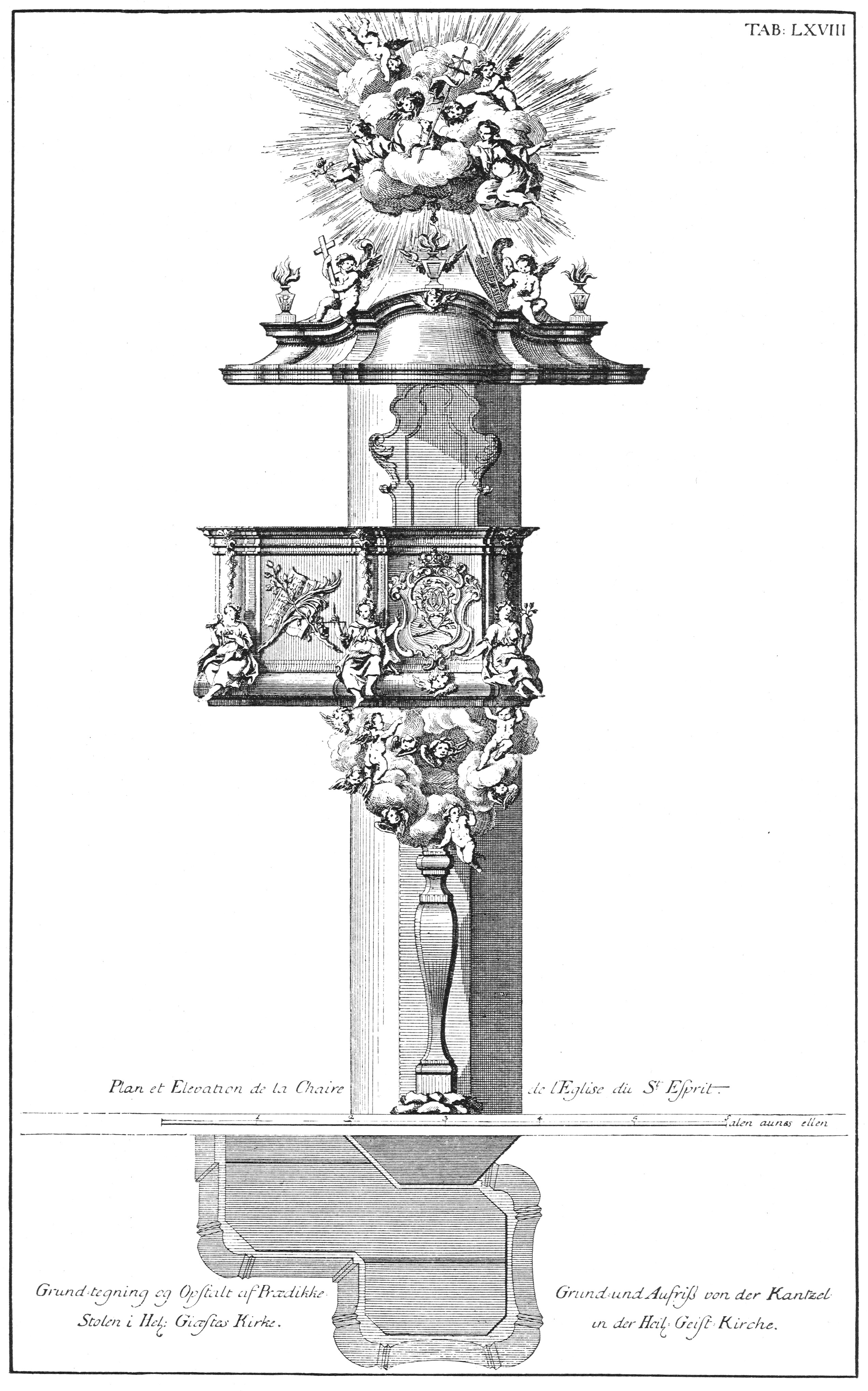
Drawing of Ehbisch's pulpit in the Church of the Holy Ghost

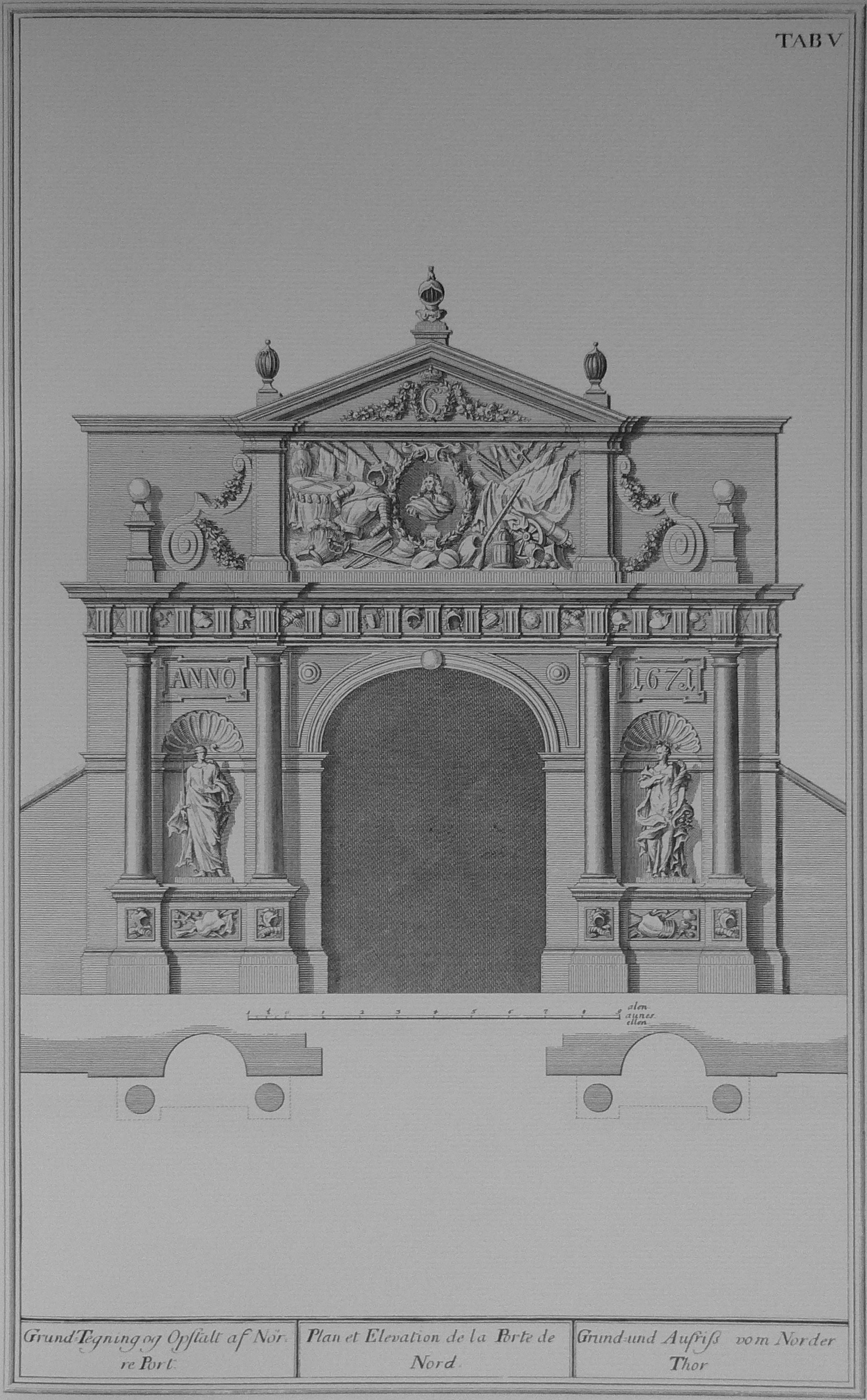
Plan and elevation of Nørreport, town gate of Copenhagen

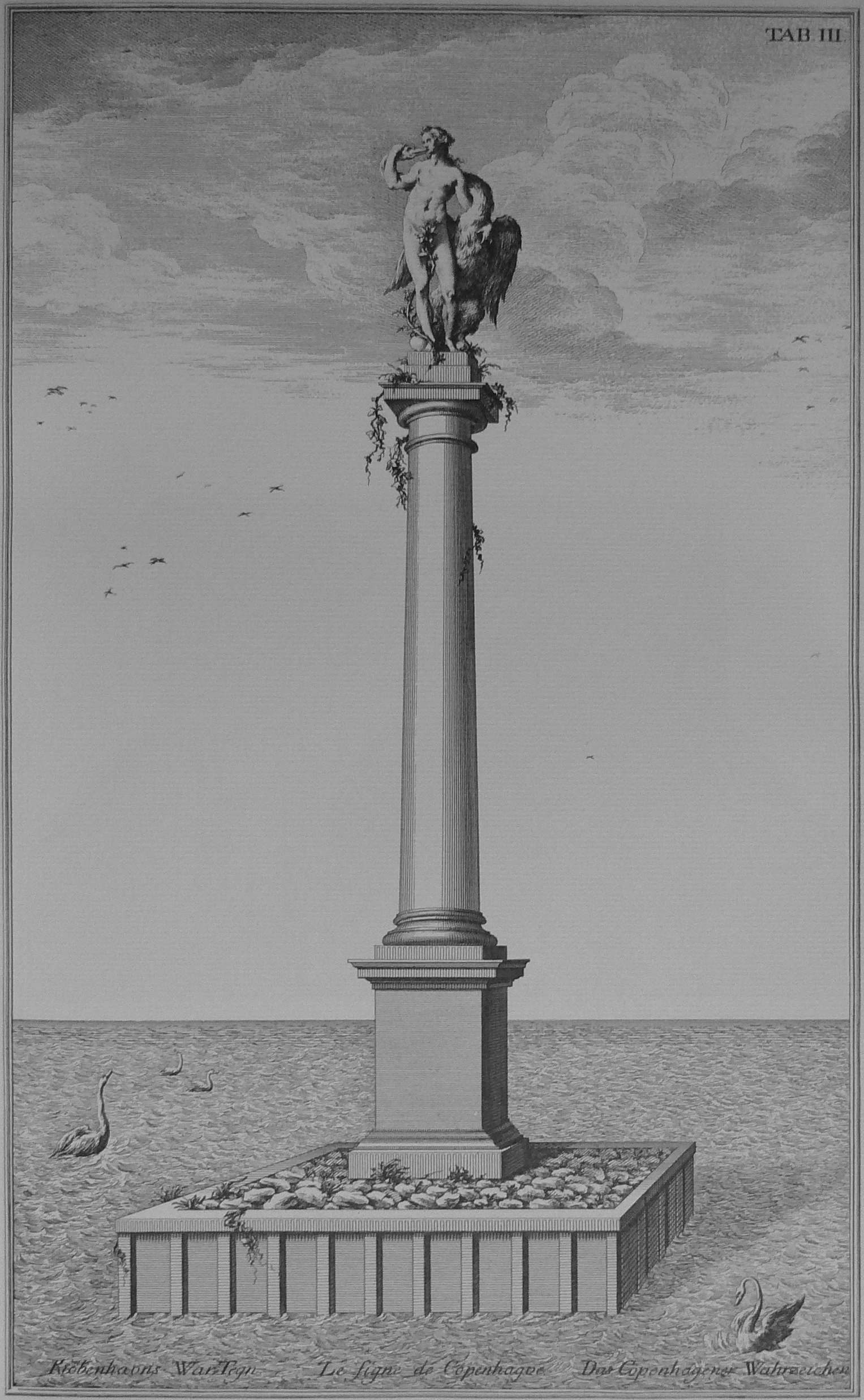
English:Statue depicting Leda and the Swan, a symbol of Copenhagen, which was located between Slotsholmen in central Copenhagen and Christianshavn from 1611 to 1798

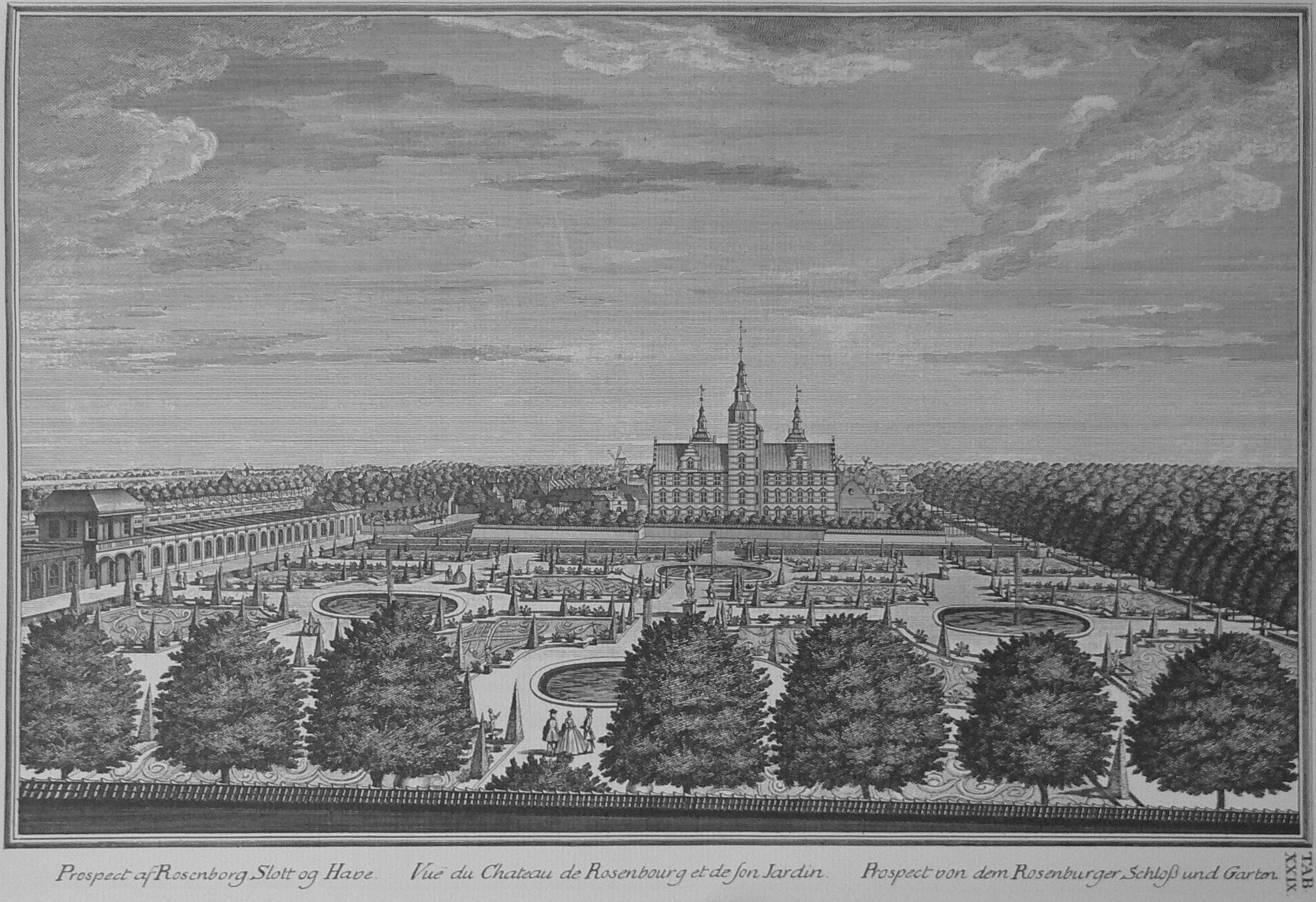
Prospect of Rosenborg Castle and castle gardens

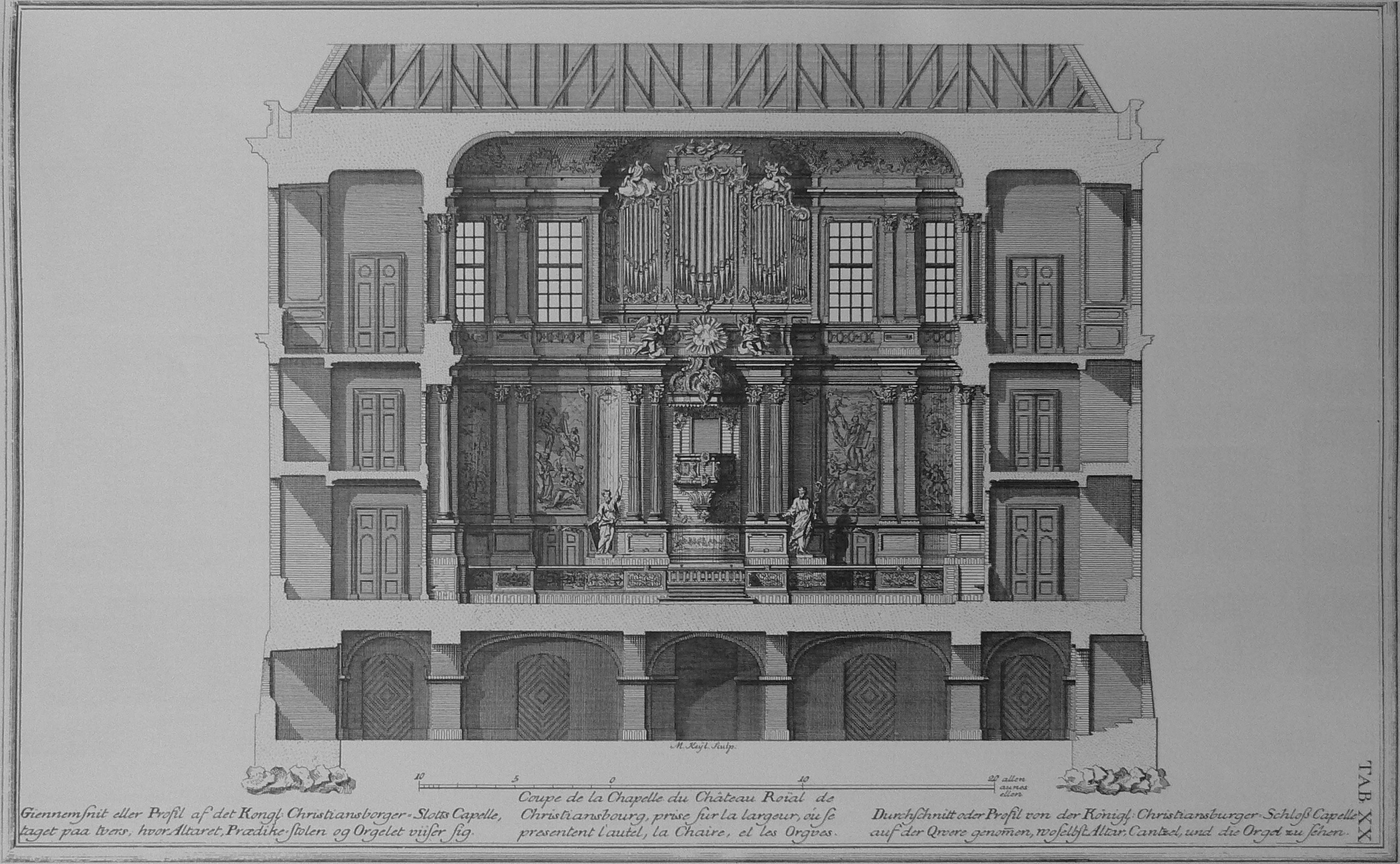
Cross section or profile of the Palace Chapel at Christiansborg Palace, showing the altar, pulpit and organ

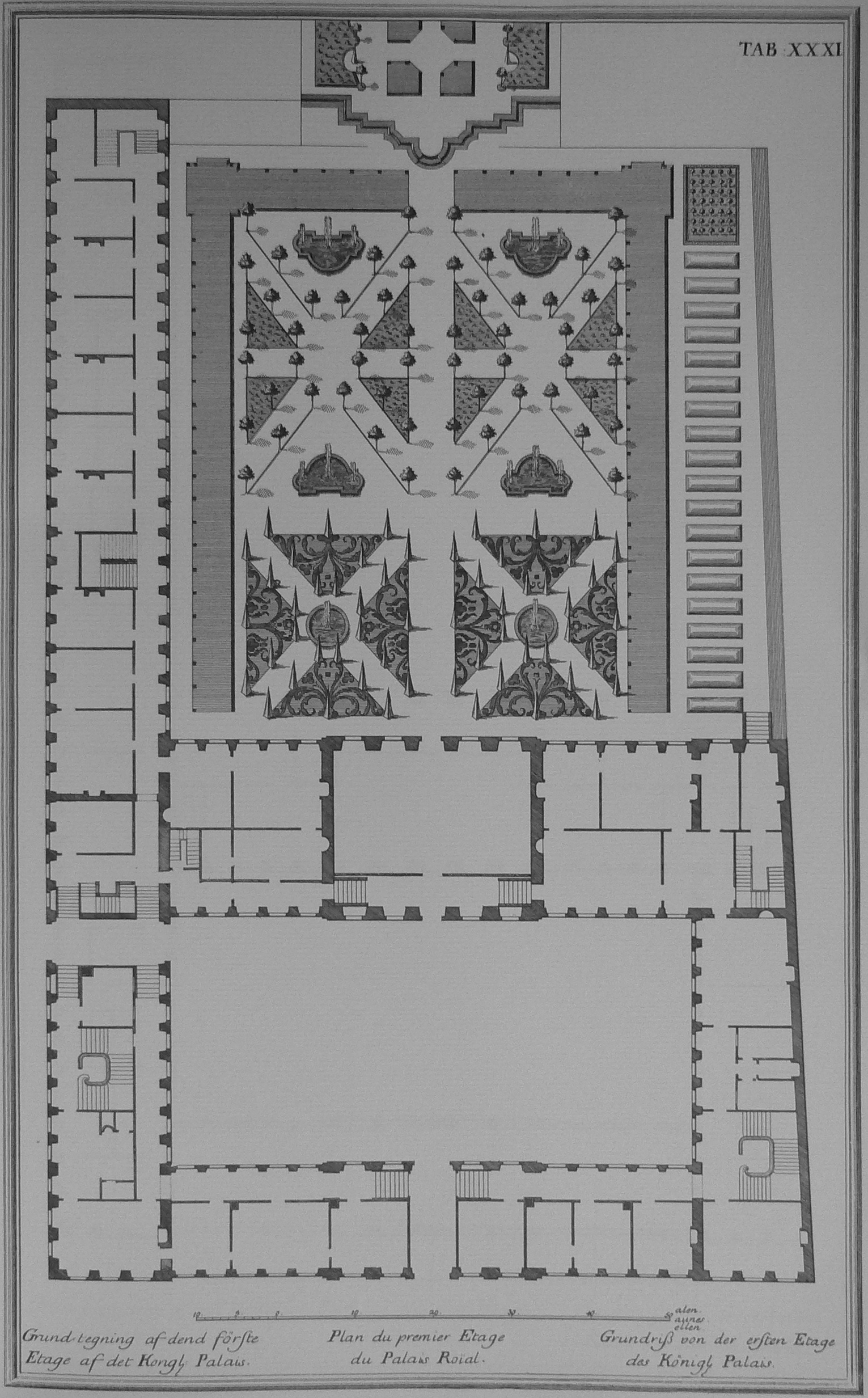
Plan of the first floor of the royal palace, Prinsens Palais, the current National Museum of Denmark

== See also ==
- Architecture of Denmark
- Bibliography of Danish architecture
