= Hafnia =

Hafnia may refer to:

- Copenhagen (of which it is the Latin name)
- Hafnia (bacterium)
- Hafnium(IV) oxide
- Hafnia Limited, a product tanker company under BW Group
