= René Berlingeri =

Puerto Rican sports shooter

Personal information
- Nationality: Puerto Rican
- Born: 15 October 1946
- Died: 27 May 2014 (aged 67)

Sport
- Sport: Sports shooting

René Berlingeri (born 15 October 1946) is a Puerto Rican sports shooter. He competed in the mixed skeet event at the 1976 Summer Olympics.
