= Edgardo Zachrisson =

Guatemalan sports shooter

Personal information
- Born: 5 May 1950 (age 76)

Sport
- Sport: Sports shooting
- Event: Skeet

Edgardo Zachrisson (born 5 May 1950) is a Guatemalan former sports shooter. He competed at the 1976 Summer Olympics. He was also a bronze medalist at the Central American and Caribbean Games and he had a brother, Mario-Oscar, who also competed at the Olympics. In his Olympic participation, Zachrisson finished sixth, after being two points short of the medal round, which remained the best ever performance by a Guatemalan shooter through 2020.
