= Bibliography of Danish architecture =

A bibliography of books and material related to the Architecture of Denmark:

== General ==
- Brochmann, Odd (1970). Copenhagen: a history of the city told through its buildings. Arkitektens forlag. ISBN 9788774070085.
- Datz, C.; Kullman, Christof (2005). Copenhagen: Architecture & Design (in German). teNeues. ISBN 978-3-8327-9077-6.
- Dickson, Thomas (November 2008). Dansk Design. Murdoch Books. ISBN 978-1-74196-317-5.
- Dirckinck-Holmfeld, Kim; Keiding, Martin (2004). Dansk arkitektur 250 år: 250 years of Danish architecture. Danish Architectural Press. ISBN 978-87-7407-302-4.
- Dirckinck-Holmfeld, Kim; Keiding, Martin; Amundsen, Marianne; Smidt, Claus M.: Danish architecture since 1754. Danish Architectural Press, 2007. 400p.
- Faber, Tobias: A history of Danish architecture. Det Danske Selskab, Copenhagen, 1978. 316p.
- Faber, Tobias (1963). Dansk arkitektur. Arkitens Forlag.
- Finsen, Helge (1947). Ung dansk Arkitektur, 1930-1945. Harald Jensen.
- Fogh, Dorte (2006). Billedkunst Perioder i Dansk Arkitektur. Gyldendal Uddannelse. ISBN 978-87-02-03701-2.
- Forblommet antik: klassicismer i dansk arkitektur og havekunst : studier tilegnede Hakon Lund 18. oktober 1988. Arkitektens Forlag. 1988. ISBN 978-87-7407-085-6.
- Hartmann, Jørgen B. (1947). Dansk Arkitektur: en Oversigt. Thaning & Appel.
- Ilkjær, Marianne Olsson (1987). Postmodernismen i dansk arkitektur: international baggrund, dansk debat og praksis. Byggeriets studiearkiv. ISBN 9788787448529.
- Jørgensen, Lisbet Balslev; Skriver, Poul Erik; Dirckinck-Holmfeld, Kim (1982). Moderne dansk arkitektur: guide. Arkiték : Arkitektens forlag.
- Lind, Olaf: Architecture guide Danish islands. Copenhagen: Danish Architectural Press, 2007. 336p.
- Lorenzen, Vilhelm (1912). Dansk Arkitektur gennem 20 Aar. 1892-1912. Erslev & Hasselbalch.
- Ørum-Nielsen, Jørn: Dwelling. Danish Architectural Press (Copenhagen). 1966. 261p.
- Raabyemagle, Hanne; Smidt, Claus M. (1998). Classicism in Copenhagen: architecture in the age of C.F. Hansen. Gyldendal.
- Sestoft, Jørgen; Christiansen, Jørgen Hegner; Dirckinck-Holmfeld, Kim (1995). Guide til dansk arkitektur. Arkitektens Forlag. ISBN 978-87-7407-154-9.
- Sestoft, Jørgen; Hegner, Christiansen Jørgen; Guide to Danish architecture, 2 vols. Arkitektens Forlag, 1995. 272p.
- Sommer, Anne-Louise (2009). Den Danske Arkitektur. Gyldendal A/S. ISBN 978-87-02-05401-9.
- Woodward, Christopher (1998). Copenhagen: The Buildings of Europe. Manchester University Press. ISBN 978-0-7190-5193-7.
- Vindum, Kjeld; Lindhardt Weiss, Kristoffer (2012). The New Wawe in Danish Architecture. Arkitektens Forlag. ISBN 9788774074106. Archived from the original on 2012-12-29.

== Castles, palaces and houses ==
- Dodd, Geoffrey (1982). Estates and manor houses in Denmark. Royal Danish Ministry of Foreign Affairs.
- Etting, Vivian (2010). Royal Castles of Denmark During the 14th Century: An Analysis of the Major Royal Castles with Special Regard to Their Functions and Strategic Importance. National Museum of Denmark. ISBN 978-87-7602-138-2.

== Churches ==
- Hermansen, Victor; Nørlund, Poul (1934–1937). Danmarks Kirker: Sorø Amt (in Danish). Vol. 1 to 2. Nationalmuseet: Gads forlag.
- Hermansen, Victor; Roussell, Aage; Steenberg, Jan (1945–1988). Danmarks Kirker: København by (in Danish). Vol. 1 to 6. Nationalmuseet: Gads forlag.
- Jørgensen, Marie-Louise; Johannsen, Hugo (1979–2001). Danmarks Kirker: Holbæk Amt (in Danish). Vol. 1 to 3. Nationalmuseet: Gads forlag.
- Moltke, Erik; Møller, Elna (1964–1979). Danmarks Kirker: Frederiksborg Amt (in Danish). Vol. 1 to 4. Nationalmuseet: Gads forlag.
- Moltke, Erik; Møller, Elna; Schultz, C.G. (1944–1951). Danmarks Kirker: Københavns Amt (in Danish). Vol. 1 to 4. Nationalmuseet: Gads forlag.
- Stilling, Niels Peter (2004). Politikens bog om Danmarks kirker (in Danish). Politiken. ISBN 978-87-567-7226-6.

== Museums ==
- Erichsen, John (1974). Museer. Danske museer gennem 200 år: 1648-1848 : Thorvaldsens Museum, 30. maj-30. sept. 1974. Thorvaldsens Museum.
- Reimert, Erik (1976). Alle danske museer. Suenson, [eksp.]. Rosenørns Alle 18. ISBN 9788787201124.
- Svendsen, Poul (1989). Museer og seværdigheder i Danmark. Branner & Korch. ISBN 978-87-411-5586-9.

== Other ==
- Kierkegaard Cain, Signe (2007). Bispebjerg Bakke: The Story of the Bispebjerg Snake. Realea. ISBN 978-8799088379.
- De Waal, Allan; et al. (2008). The Architecture at Carlsberg (in English and Danish). Arkitektens Forlag. ISBN 9788774073932. Archived from the original on 2015-04-27.

== Outstanding architects ==
Arne Jacobsen

- Dyssegaard, Søren (ed.); Jacobsen, Arne; Skriver, Poul Erik: Arne Jacobsen, a Danish architect, (translation: Reginald Spink and Bodil Garner), 1971, Copenhagen: Ministry of Foreign Affairs, 56 p. ISBN 87-85112-00-3
- Jacobsen, Arne: Arne Jacobsen: absolutely modern, 2002, Humlebaek: Louisiana Museum of Modern Art, 96 p. ISBN 87-90029-74-7
- Solaguren-Beascoa de Corral, Felix: Arne Jacobsen (Obras y Proyectos / Works and Projects), 1992, Barcelona, Editorial Gustavo Gili, 222 pages. ISBN 84-252-1404-1
- Thau, Carsten; Vindum, Kjeld: Arne Jacobsen, 2008, Copenhagen, Arkitektens forlag, 560 p. ISBN 978-87-7407-230-0
- Tøjner, Poul Erik; Vindum, Kjeld (1994). Arne Jacobsen: architect & designer. Dansk Design Center. ISBN 9788787385459.

Henning Larsen

- Larsen, Henning, De skal sige tak. Kulturhistorisk testamente om Operaen (They wish to say thank you. Cultural comments about the Opera), People's Press 2009. ISBN 978-87-7055-783-2
- Møller, Henrik Sten; Larsen, Henning (2000). Light and life: Henning Larsen, the man and the architect. Politiken.
- Sten Møller, Henrik, Legen og lyset. En frise over Henning Larsen som menneske og arkitekt (Light and Life. A portrait of Henning Larsen as a person and an architect), Politikens Forlag 2000, ISBN 87-567-6551-7

Jørn Utzon

- Keiding, Martin and Dirckinck-Holmfeld, Kim (ed.): Utzon and the new tradition, Utzon Library, Copenhagen, Danish Architectural Press, 2005, 262 pages. ISBN 87-7407-313-3
- Keiding, Martin and Dirckinck-Holmfeld, Kim (ed.): Utzon's own houses, Utzon Library, Copenhagen, Danish Architectural Press, 2004. ISBN 87-7407-316-8
- Utzon, Jørn: Additive Architecture: Logbook Vol. V, Copenhagen, Edition Bløndal, 2009, 312 pages. ISBN 87-91567-23-8
- Utzon, Jørn: Bagsværd Church: Logbook Vol. II, Copenhagen, Edition Bløndal, 2005, 168 pages. ISBN 87-91567-07-6
- Utzon, Jørn: Kuwait National Assembly: Logbook Vol. IV, Copenhagen, Edition Bløndal, 2008, 312 pages. ISBN 87-91567-21-1
- Utzon, Jørn: Two Houses on Majorca: Logbook Vol. III, Copenhagen, Edition Bløndal, 2004, 76 pages. ISBN 87-91567-03-3
- Utzon, Jørn: The Courtyard Houses: Logbook Vol. I, Copenhagen, Edition Bløndal, 2004, 180 pages. ISBN 87-91567-01-7
- Utzon Jørn and Drew, Philip: Sydney Opera House, London, Phaidon Press, 1995, 60 pages. ISBN 0-7148-3297-9

== Universities ==
- Aarhus universitet (1961). The Buildings of the Aarhus University, 1933-1961: The University Library. Aarhus University.
