= Pavlos Kanellakis =

Greek sports shooter

Personal information
- Nationality: Greek
- Born: 3 May 1939 (age 85); Thessaloniki, Greece

Sport
- Sport: Sports shooting

Pavlos Kanellakis (born 3 May 1939) is a Greek sports shooter. He competed in the mixed skeet event at the 1976 Summer Olympics.
