= Paul Laporte (sport shooter) =

Canadian sports shooter (born 1928)

Personal information
- Born: 9 May 1928 (age 96); Edmundston, New Brunswick, Canada

Sport
- Sport: Sports shooting

Paul Laporte (born 9 May 1928) is a Canadian retired sports shooter. He competed in the mixed skeet event at the 1976 Summer Olympics.
