= Anders Carlsson (sport shooter) =

Swedish sports shooter (born 1949)

Personal information
- Nationality: Swedish
- Born: 18 July 1949 (age 76) Norrköping, Sweden

Sport
- Sport: Sports shooting

Anders Carlsson (born 18 July 1949) is a Swedish sports shooter. He competed in the mixed skeet event at the 1976 Summer Olympics.
