= Lauritz de Thurah =

Danish architect (1706–1759)

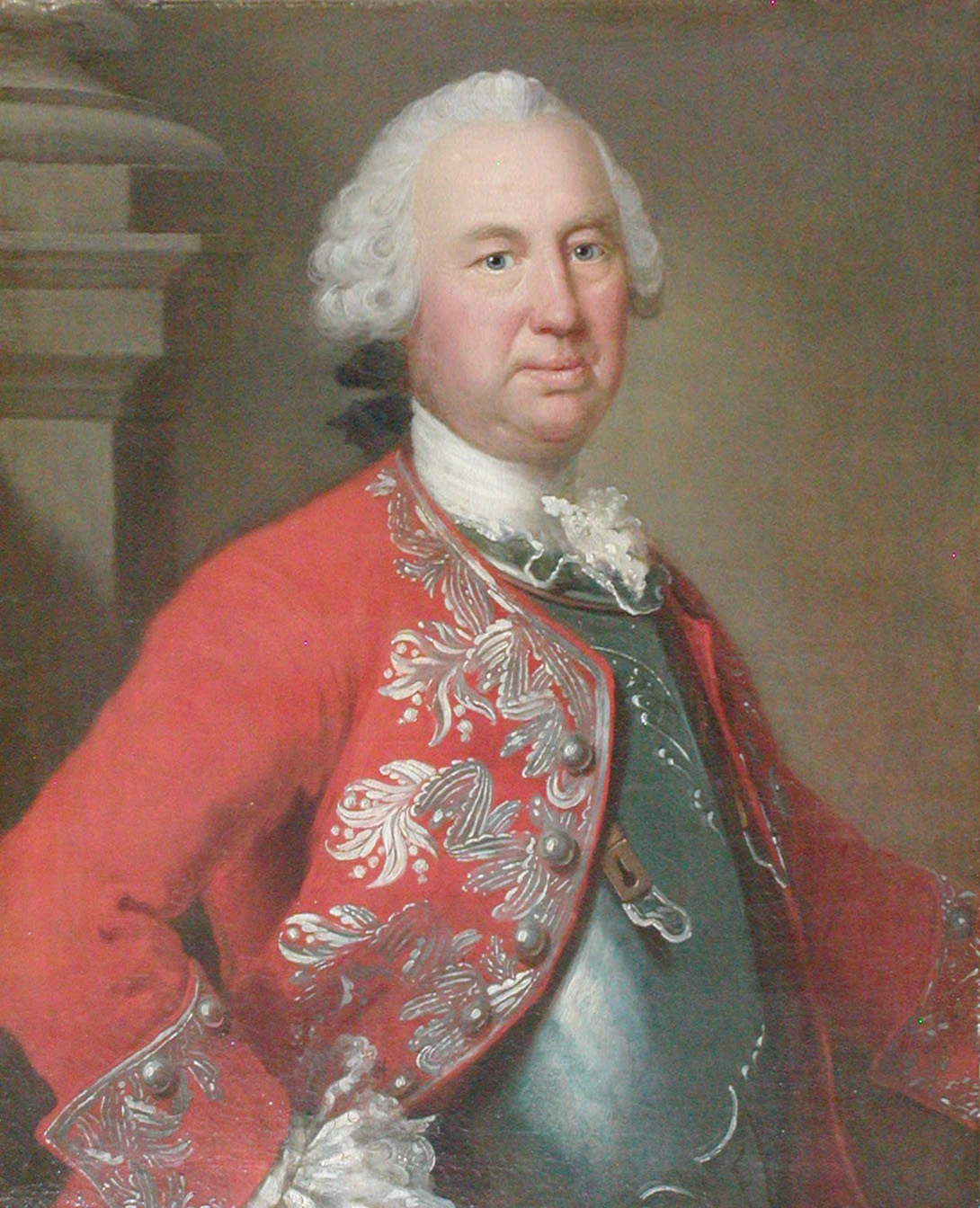
- Laurids de Thurah painted in 1754 by Johan Hörner
- Born: 4 March 1706; Mariager, Denmark
- Died: 5 September 1759 (aged 53); Copenhagen, Denmark
- Occupation: Architect
- Buildings: Spire of Church of Our Saviour; Eremitage Palace; Gammel Holtegård

Signature
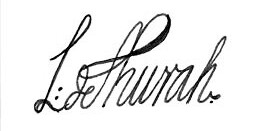

Laurids Lauridsen de Thurah, known as Lauritz de Thurah (4 March 1706 – 5 September 1759), was a Danish architect and architectural writer. He became the most important Danish architect of the late baroque period. As an architectural writer and historian he made a vital contribution to the understanding of both Denmark's architectural heritage and building construction in his day.

De Thurah was a self-taught architect who learned much of what he knew by studying the inspiring buildings he saw on his travels outside Denmark between 1729 and 1731. He brought home the baroque style, which was then popular, but was quickly losing way to rococo. Throughout his life he maintained a loyalty to the baroque, even as the world around him continued to change and he lost work assignments to others who mastered the newer, more popular styles.

== Early life and education ==
Lauritz de Thurah was born Laurids Lauridsen Thura in Aarhus, the third son of parish priest Laurids Thura, later Bishop of Ribe, and wife Helene Cathrine de With. He was educated at home by the elder Thura, a scholarly and able teacher. By chance he came into contact with the royal house when King Frederik IV called on the Bishop, and chose the boy and his older brother Diderich for military service. In 1719 he went to Copenhagen as a military cadet, a landkadet in Danish, to receive an education for the Engineer Corps at the Military Cadet Academy (Landkadetakademiet).

He was employed in 1725 as Assistant Resident Engineer in the Holstein Engineering Corps, and he moved to Rendsburg where he served from 1725 to 1729.

With an interest in improving his lot in life by eventually coming into an architectural career, he enthusiastically studied the local building style, and petitioned the king for a royal grant to study civil architecture on a longer travel to foreign lands. In order to attain this he made carefully detailed drawings of Rendsburg's fortifications, churches and houses, and a preliminary construction drawing for a suspension bridge.

The king was impressed, and promised to give him funds, but instead he gave Thura and his friend Lieutenant Holger Rosenkrantz additional surveying and drawing assignments. Finally Thura, after having sent the king many reminders of his promised financial assistance, went to Copenhagen and was put to a final test, before receiving the economic grant so he and Rosenkrantz could travel.

Thura also made drawings and measurements of the newest castle in Denmark, Fredensborg, which were given as a gift to the Count of Hesse, before he traveled.

Thura and Rosenkrantz left in 1729, and visited a number of German cities, including Kassel, where they made careful studies and measurements of buildings. They traveled further to Italy, France, Holland and England before returning to Denmark in 1731.

== Career ==
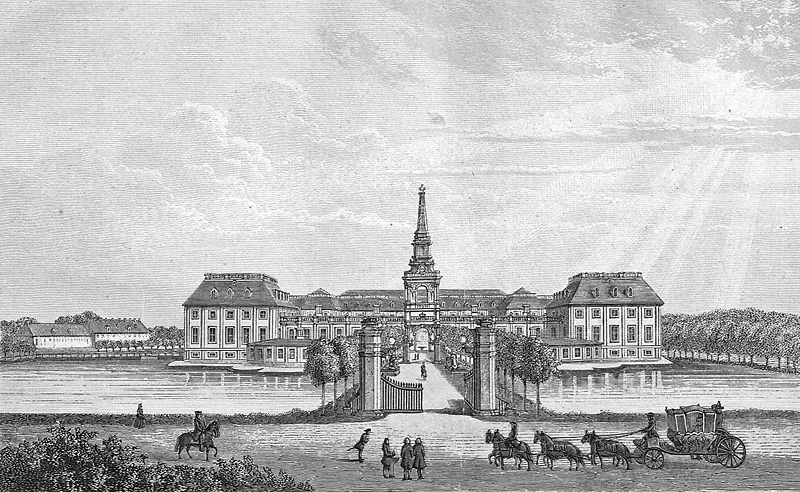
Hirschholm as illustrated in J. P. Trap: Kongeriget Danmark 2nd edition, 1872

After his return home, Thura rose rapidly up the ranks. He became resident engineer in 1732. In 1733 he was named Royal Building Master with supervisory responsibility for royal buildings on Zealand and on Lolland-Falster. At the same time, he was promoted to captain in the Engineering Corps.

In 1732–1736, he designed and built the royal palace in Roskilde, also known as the Yellow Palace, on the site of the old bishop's palace east of Roskilde Cathedral. The four-wing baroque building became the headquarters of the Duke of Wellington during the English siege of Copenhagen in 1807, and now houses the Museum of Contemporary Art.

In 1733–1739, he worked on the first remodelling and expansion of Hirschholm Palace for King Christian VI and his consort, Queen Sophie Magdalene.

In 1734–36, de Thurah built the Eremitage Palace, a palatial hunting lodge overlooking Jægersborg Dyrehave north of Copenhagen, and facing east over the Øresund to Sweden. The grey-stone house with copper-clad mansard roof replaced another hunting lodge named "Hubertus", which had been built nearby in the 17th century. The original design featured an elevator-table, similar to a dumbwaiter, which could be raised from the cellar up to the dining room. In this way, servants stayed in the cellar kitchen, where they prepared and set the table, and then it could be hoisted up to the dining room through a hatch in the floor. Diners would then eat unattended by servants or "en eremit", that is "in the hermit style". The lodge is still in use to this day for special occasions.

But already after only a couple of years' service back in Denmark, Thura began to feel that his baroque style had gone out of fashion. He felt that baroque was losing ground to rococo, a style mastered by another force in contemporary Danish architectural circles, Nicolai Eigtved, who would be Thura's colleague and rival throughout most of his career. Eigtved, who returned to Denmark from his travels in 1735, became the king's preferred architect, and Thura felt himself being more and more set to the side.

In 1736 Thura was promoted to lieutenant colonel. He participated, along with German architect Elias David Hausser and Nicolai Eigtved, in the interior construction of (the first) Christiansbrog Palace. He designed some of the interiors in the Queen's apartments 1737–1740, but these were lost in the fire of 1794. He also created plans for the main staircase, the chapel, the marble bridge, the pavilions and the riding grounds, which were never realised.

On 19 October 1740, he married Anna Rosenørn, daughter of a General Major, and was conferred nobility under the name "de Thurah".

In 1741, de Thurah elevated the roof of the main building at Fredensborg Palace. In 1742 he was named to the Building Commission, and took on supervisory responsibility for royal buildings on Zealand and Funen.

In 1743–1744, he designed the final rebuilding of Hirschholm Palace, the most impressive building project of the period, known as "the Versailles of the North". The same year, work was completed on the tower and spire for the Church of Our Lady, in Copenhagen, partially after a drawing by Vincents Lerche. The building, however burned down during the bombardment of Copenhagen in 1807, and was rebuilt by Christian Frederik Hansen.

In 1744, de Thurah was promoted to colonel. His three-volume work Den danske Vitruvius was published in 1746–1749, containing almost 400 drawings and measurements of buildings in Copenhagen and royal castles and other interesting buildings in Denmark, with Danish, German and French text.

Frustrated by his losing assignments to Eigtved, he petitioned the king in 1747 for a new non-architectural position, but that was rejected.

In 1748, de Thurah was asked to assist on the building of a new spire on the Lambert van Haven designed Church of Our Saviour in the Christianshavn district of Copenhagen. He chose a design inspired by the Sant’ivo della Sapienza church he had seen in Rome many years before. The new design however was much more costly than the king's original plan, and this led to a fierce rivalry between de Thurah and Eigtved over the choice of building material. The king finally sided with de Thurah.

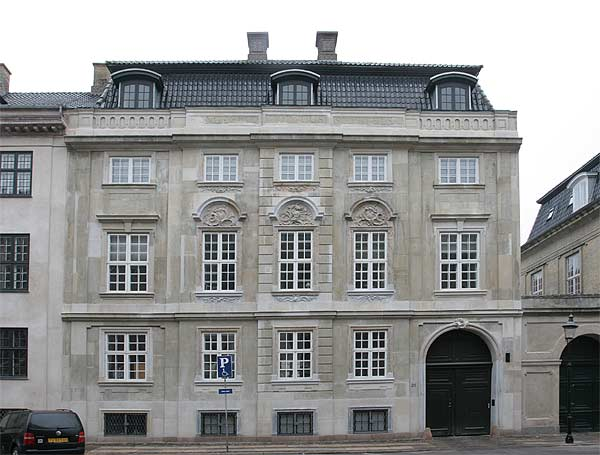
Thurah's own house at 25 Amaliegade in Copenhagen, built to his own design in 1755-57

That same year, de Thurah's wife died. He married again, on 16 January 1750, to Christiane Marie de Kiærskiold, heiress to Børglum Kloster. He felt overlooked and pressured by colleague Eigtved, and so he pulled back on his career. He moved out of Copenhagen to the estate at Børglum Monastery in Jutland with his wife.

De Thurah's masterpiece, the ornate, spiral-staircased spire on Our Saviour's Church, topped with globe and figure, was completed in 1752, and can still be seen high-above Christianshavn to this day.

In 1753, after his retirement from the Engineering Corps, he was named General Major. That same year he gave up his responsibility for royal buildings on Zealand, that being taken over by Nicolai Eigtved. In 1754, he was named General Building Master, while Eigtved took over as Royal Building Master.

The six-years-older Eigtved died that same year, causing de Thurah to be called back into service as the leading architect of the day.

De Thurah was assigned the completion of work in Eigtved's Frederiksstad district centred on Amalienborg, including the last two palaces on the eastern side of the square, and in 1754–1758 he designed and built the four pavilions at Frederiks Hospital, now housing the Danish Museum of Art & Design, which Eigtved had begun in 1752. He also built a house for himself in the district at 25 Amaliegade from 1755 to 1757.

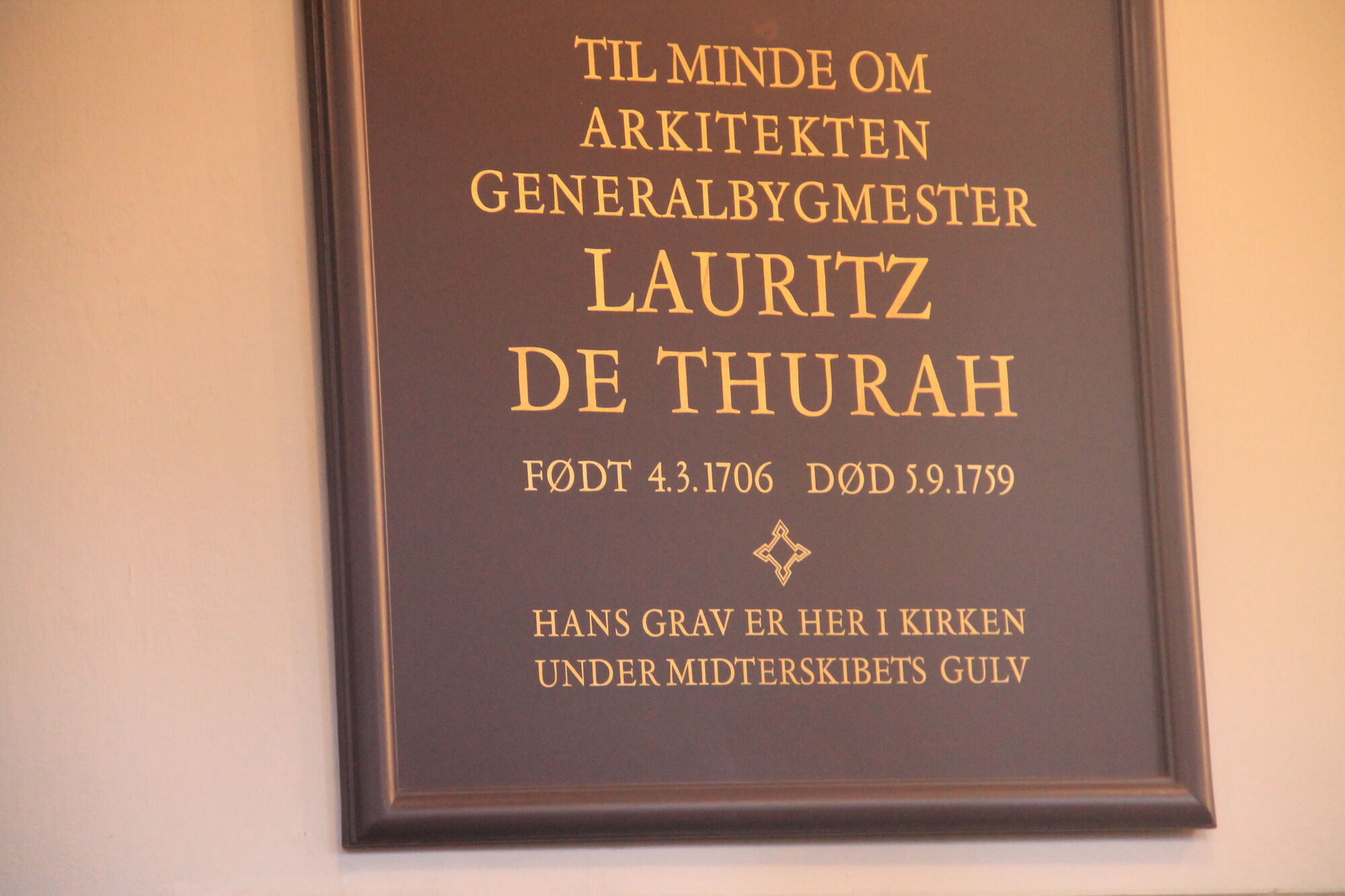
Plaque in Trinitatis Church, Copenhagen.

He also tried to get plans approved for Frederik's Church, the centerpiece of the Frederiksstad area. He wanted to build a stone dome in the style of Michelangelo. The work eventually went to French neoclassical architect Nicolas-Henri Jardin.

He died during the night of 5 September 1759 in Copenhagen, and is buried in Trinitatis Church.

== Writings ==
Parallel to his work as a practicing architect, de Thurah wrote several important treatises on Danish architecture. In 1735 de Thurah received a royal grant to collect information and to write a comprehensive work on architecture in Denmark, detailing all the royal buildings in the country. This work, eventually called Den Danske Vitruvius (English: The Danish Vitruvius) (1746–48), would take up increasing amounts of his time as his architectural assignments diminished. Another central work of architectural importance by de Thurah is Hafnia Hodierna, published in 1748.

Additionally, he published illustrated books about Bornholm, Christiansø, Amager, Saltholm, and Samsø between 1756 and 1758).

== Awards ==
Thurah and his brother were both ennobled by Christian VI on 14 October 1740.

== Selected works ==
- Roskilde Mansion (1732–1736)

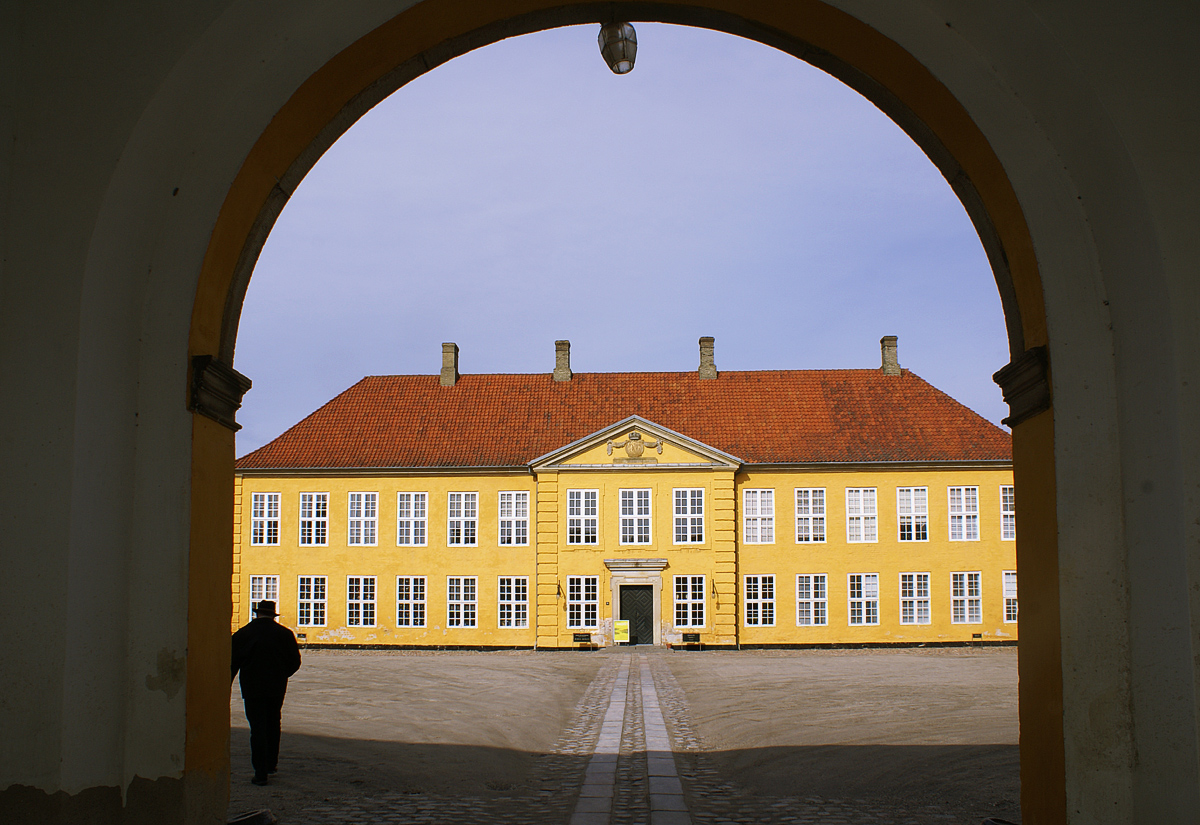
Yellow Palace in Roskilde, housing the Museum of Contemporary Art

- Eremitage Palace (1734–36)
- Four pavilions at Frederiks Hospital (1754–58)
- Gammel Holtegård (1756–57)
- Hirschholm Palace (1733–44, demolished)
- Spire of the Church of Our Saviour (1749–52)

== See also ==
- Architecture of Denmark

== Bibliography ==
- Thule Kristensen, Peter, ed. (2023). Lauritz de Thurah - Architecture and Worldviews in 18th Century Denmark. Copenhagen: Strandberg Publishing. p. 432. ISBN 978-8794102704.
